= List of members of the National Council of Slovakia, 2012–2016 =

This is list of members of the National council, the parliament of Slovakia as they were elected in the 2012 parliamentary election.

1. Pavol Abrhan KDH
2. Ladislav Andreánsky SMER - SD
3. Michal Bagačka SMER - SD
4. Vladimír Baláž SMER - SD
5. Tibor Bastrnák MOST - HÍD
6. Jaroslav Baška SMER - SD
7. Miroslav Beblavý SDKÚ - DS
8. Juraj Blanár SMER - SD
9. Otto Brixi SMER - SD
10. Július Brocka KDH
11. Dušan Bublavý SMER - SD
12. Jozef Buček SMER - SD
13. Béla Bugár MOST - HÍD
14. Jozef Burian SMER - SD
15. Gabriel Csicsai MOST - HÍD
16. Dušan Čaplovič SMER - SD
17. Miroslav Číž SMER - SD
18. Jaroslav Demian SMER - SD
19. Juraj Droba SaS
20. Daniel Duchoň SMER - SD
21. Mikuláš Dzurinda SDKÚ - DS
22. Árpád Érsek MOST - HÍD
23. Vladimír Faič SMER - SD
24. Martin Fecko OĽaNO
25. Igor Federič SMER - SD
26. Martin Fedor SDKÚ - DS
27. Robert Fico SMER - SD
28. Ján Figeľ KDH
29. Pavol Frešo SDKÚ - DS
30. Martin Fronc KDH
31. Darina Gabániová SMER - SD
32. Dušan Galis SMER - SD
33. Ľubomír Galko SaS
34. Gábor Gál MOST - HÍD
35. Milan Géci SMER - SD
36. Monika Gibalová KDH
37. Tibor Glenda SMER - SD
38. Martin Glváč SMER - SD
39. Pavol Goga SMER - SD
40. Lea Grečková SMER - SD
41. Augustín Hambálek SMER - SD
42. Alojz Hlina OĽaNO
43. Eva Horváthová OĽaNO
44. Igor Hraško OĽaNO
45. Andrej Hrnčiar MOST - HÍD
46. Pavol Hrušovský KDH
47. Mikuláš Huba OĽaNO
48. Ján Hudacký KDH
49. Rudolf Chmel MOST - HÍD
50. Igor Choma SMER - SD
51. Martin Chren SaS
52. Ľubomír Jahnátek SMER - SD
53. Elemér Jakab MOST - HÍD
54. Mária Janíková SMER - SD
55. Dušan Jarjabek SMER - SD
56. Viliam Jasaň SMER - SD
57. Vladimír Jánoš SMER - SD
58. Erika Jurinová OĽaNO
59. Miroslav Kadúc OĽaNO
60. Robert Kaliňák SMER - SD
61. Ladislav Kamenický SMER - SD
62. Ľudovít Kaník SDKÚ - DS
63. Peter Kažimír SMER - SD
64. Marián Kéry SMER - SD
65. Andrej Kolesík SMER - SD
66. Jozef Kollár SaS
67. Maroš Kondrót SMER - SD
68. Magda Košútová SMER - SD
69. Marián Kovačócy SMER - SD
70. Daniel Krajcer SaS
71. Mikuláš Krajkovič SMER - SD
72. Stanislav Kubánek SMER - SD
73. Štefan Kuffa OĽaNO
74. Marián Kvasnička KDH
75. Jana Laššáková SMER - SD
76. Tibor Lebocký SMER - SD
77. Daniel Lipšic KDH
78. Iveta Lišková SMER - SD
79. Michal Lukša SMER - SD
80. Róbert Madej SMER - SD
81. Marek Maďarič SMER - SD
82. Mojmír Mamojka SMER - SD
83. Ľuboš Martinák SMER - SD
84. Anton Martvoň SMER - SD
85. Vladimír Matejička SMER - SD
86. Igor Matovič OĽaNO
87. Helena Mezenská OĽaNO
88. Ján Mičovský OĽaNO
89. Jozef Mihál SaS
90. Ivan Mikloš SDKÚ - DS
91. Jozef Mikloško KDH
92. Jozef Mikuš SDKÚ - DS
93. Juraj Miškov SaS
94. Milan Mojš SMER - SD
95. Dušan Muňko SMER - SD
96. Peter Muránsky KDH
97. Emília Müllerová SMER - SD
98. József Nagy MOST - HÍD
99. Oľga Nachtmannová SMER - SD
100. Lucia Nicholsonová SaS
101. Viliam Novotný SDKÚ - DS
102. Bibiána Obrimčáková SMER - SD
103. Branislav Ondruš SMER - SD
104. Peter Osuský SaS
105. Milan Panáček SMER - SD
106. Pavol Paška SMER - SD
107. Pavol Pavlis SMER - SD
108. Svetlana Pavlovičová SMER - SD
109. Peter Pellegrini SMER - SD
110. Ľubomír Petrák SMER - SD
111. Ján Počiatek SMER - SD
112. Ján Podmanický SMER - SD
113. Martin Poliačik SaS
114. Peter Pollák OĽaNO
115. Radoslav Procházka KDH
116. Alojz Přidal KDH
117. Róbert Puci SMER - SD
118. Richard Raši SMER - SD
119. Ján Richter SMER - SD
120. Mária Ritomská OĽaNO
121. Ľubica Rošková SMER - SD
122. Marián Saloň SMER - SD
123. Ján Senko SMER - SD
124. Zsolt Simon MOST - HÍD
125. László Sólymos MOST - HÍD
126. Ľuboš Blaha SMER - SD
127. Richard Sulík SaS
128. Boris Susko SMER - SD
129. František Šebej MOST - HÍD
130. Branislav Škripek OĽaNO
131. Ivan Štefanec SDKÚ - DS
132. Peter Šuca SMER - SD
133. Ivan Švejna MOST - HÍD
134. Viera Tomanová SMER - SD
135. Ivan Uhliarik KDH
136. Jozef Valocký SMER - SD
137. Jana Vaľová SMER - SD
138. Ivan Varga SMER - SD
139. Richard Vašečka OĽaNO
140. Magdaléna Vášáryová SDKÚ - DS
141. Ľubomír Vážny SMER - SD
142. Jozef Viskupič OĽaNO
143. Anna Vitteková SMER - SD
144. Pavol Zajac KDH
145. Marián Záhumenský SMER - SD
146. Renáta Zmajkovičová SMER - SD
147. Ľubomír Želiezka SMER - SD
148. Peter Žiga SMER - SD
149. Jana Žitňanská KDH
150. Lucia Žitňanská SDKÚ - DS
