= Fico's First Cabinet =

- 6th Cabinet of Slovakia
- 4 July 2006 – 8 July 2010
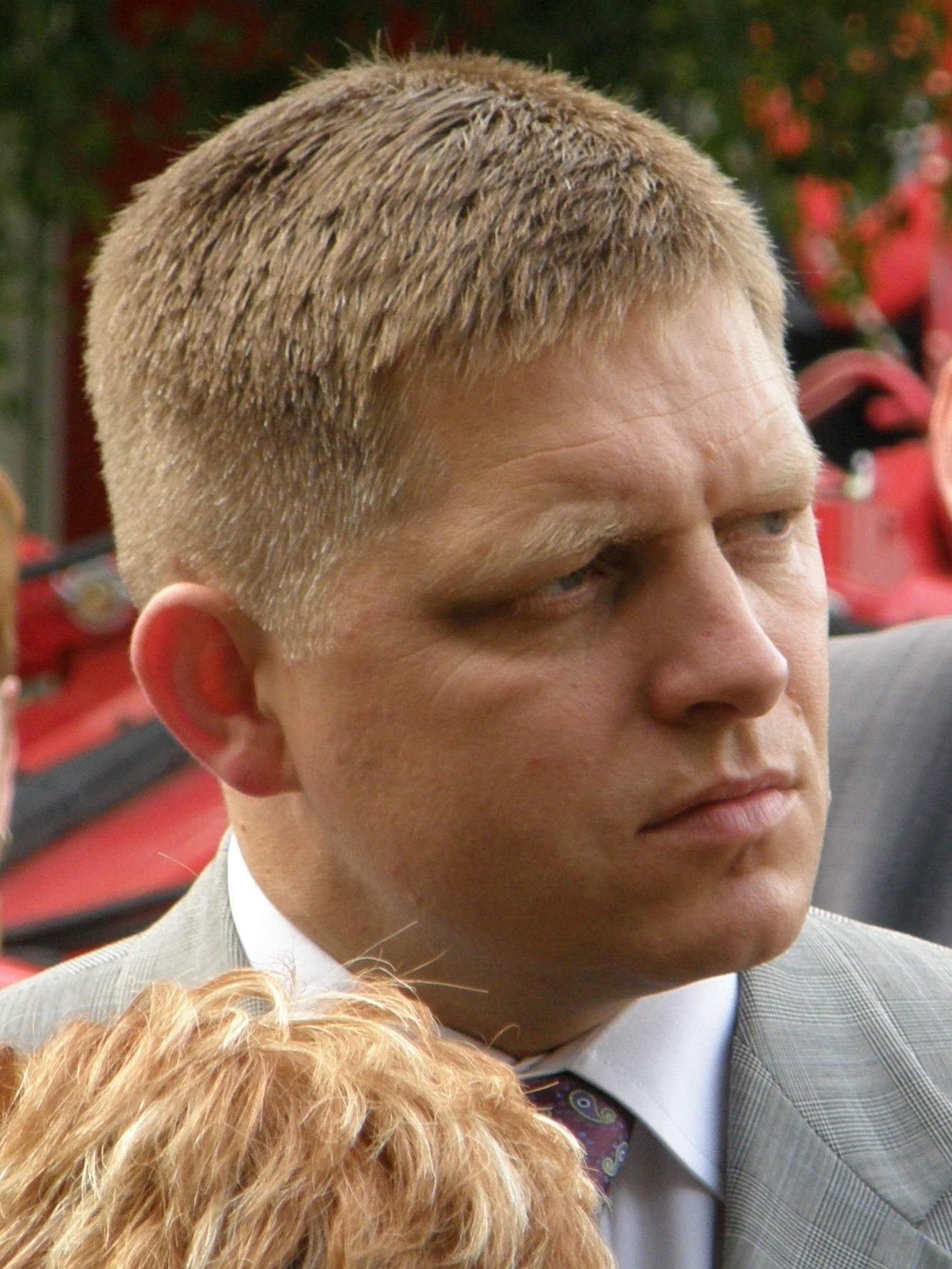
- Robert Fico in 2008
- Date formed: 4 July 2006
- Date dissolved: 8 July 2010

People and organisations
- Head of state: Ivan Gašparovič
- Head of government: Robert Fico
- No. of ministers: 16
- Ministers removed: 12
- Total no. of members: 28
- Member party: Smer-SD; ĽS-HZDS; SNS
- Status in legislature: Majority Coalition
- Opposition party: SDKÚ – DS; SMK; KDH; KDS (2008–2010); Most–Híd (2009–2010)
- Opposition leader: Mikuláš Dzurinda

History
- Election: 2006 Slovak parliamentary election
- Incoming formation: 2006
- Outgoing formation: 2010
- Predecessor: Dzurinda's Second Cabinet
- Successor: Radičová's Cabinet

Prime Minister of Slovakia Robert Fico formed his first cabinet from 2006 to 2010. President Ivan Gašparovič appointed the cabinet on 4 July 2006.

== Government ministers ==
Office	Minister	Political Party	In office
Prime Minister	Robert Fico	Direction–Social Democracy	4 July 2006 – 8 July 2010
Minister of Labour, Social Affairs and Family	Viera Tomanová	Direction–Social Democracy	4 July 2006 – 8 July 2010
Minister of Finance	Ján Počiatek	Direction–Social Democracy	4 July 2006 – 8 July 2010
Minister of Economy	Ľubomír Jahnátek	Direction–Social Democracy	4 July 2006 – 8 July 2010
Minister of Agriculture	Miroslav Jureňa	ĽS-HZDS	4 July 2006 – 28 November 2007
Minister of Agriculture	Zdenka Kramplová	ĽS-HZDS	28 November 2007 – 18 August 2008
Minister of Agriculture	Stanislav Becík	ĽS-HZDS	18 August 2008 – 16 September 2009
Minister of Agriculture	Vladimír Chovan	ĽS-HZDS	16 September 2009 – 8 July 2010
Minister of Interior	Robert Kaliňák	Direction–Social Democracy	4 July 2006 – 8 July 2010
Minister of Defence	František Kašický	Direction–Social Democracy	4 July 2006 – 30 January 2008
Minister of Defence	Jaroslav Baška	Direction–Social Democracy	30 January 2008 – 8 July 2010
Minister of Justice	Štefan Harabin	ĽS-HZDS	4 July 2006 – 23 June 2009
Minister of Justice	Robert Fico (Acting)	Direction–Social Democracy	23 June 2009 – 3 July 2009
Minister of Justice	Viera Petríková	ĽS-HZDS	3 July 2009 – 8 July 2010
Minister of Foreign Affairs	Ján Kubiš	Direction–Social Democracy	4 July 2006 – 26 January 2009
Minister of Foreign Affairs	Miroslav Lajčák	Direction–Social Democracy	26 January 2009 – 8 July 2010
Minister of Education	Ján Mikolaj	Slovak National Party	4 July 2006 – 8 July 2010
Minister of Culture	Marek Maďarič	Direction–Social Democracy	4 July 2006 – 8 July 2010
Minister of Health	Ivan Valentovič	Direction–Social Democracy	4 July 2006 – 3 June 2008
Minister of Health	Richard Raši	Direction–Social Democracy	3 June 2008 – 8 July 2010
Minister of the Environment	Jaroslav Izák	Slovak National Party	4 July 2006 – 18 August 2008
Minister of the Environment	Ján Chrbet	Slovak National Party	18 August 2008 – 5 May 2009
Minister of the Environment	Ján Mikolaj (Acting)	Slovak National Party	6 May 2009 – 20 May 2009
Minister of the Environment	Viliam Turský	Slovak National Party	20 May 2009 – 28 August 2009
Minister of the Environment	Dušan Čaplovič (Acting)	Direction–Social Democracy	28 August 2009 – 28 October 2009
Minister of the Environment	Jozef Medveď	Direction–Social Democracy	29 October 2009 – 30 June 2010
Minister of Construction and Regional Development	Marian Janušek	Slovak National Party	4 July 2006 – 15 April 2009
Minister of Construction and Regional Development	Igor Štefanov	Slovak National Party	15 April 2009 – 11 April 2010
Minister of Construction and Regional Development	Ján Mikolaj (Acting)	Slovak National Party	11 April 2010 – 30 June 2010
Minister of Transport, Post and Telecommunications	Ľubomír Vážny	Direction–Social Democracy	4 July 2006 – 8 July 2010

=== Deputy Prime Ministers ===
Minister	Political Party	In office	Notes
Robert Kaliňák	Direction–Social Democracy	4 July 2006 – 8 July 2010	1st Deputy Prime Minister
Dušan Čaplovič	Direction–Social Democracy	4 July 2006 – 8 July 2010	Deputy Prime Minister of Knowledge-Based Society, European Affairs, Human Rights and Minorities
Ján Mikolaj	Slovak National Party	4 July 2006 – 8 July 2010	
Štefan Harabin	ĽS-HZDS	4 July 2006 – 23 June 2009	
Viera Petríková	ĽS-HZDS	3 July 2009 – 8 July 2010	Replaced Štefan Harabin

== Party composition ==
Party	Ideology	Leader	Deputies	Ministers
SMER-SD	Social democracy	Robert Fico	50 / 150	11 / 16
SNS	Ultranationalism	Ján Slota	20 / 150	3 / 16
ĽS-HZDS	Slovak nationalism	Vladimír Mečiar	15 / 150	2 / 16
Total			85 / 150	16

== Confidence motion ==
Motion of confidence Robert Fico (SMER-SD)
Ballot →	4 August 2006
Required majority →	68 out of 135 (simple)
Yes: • SMER-SD (49); • SNS (18); • ĽS-HZDS (13)	80 / 150
No: • SDKÚ-DS (29); • KDH (11); • SMK (15)	55 / 150
Abstentions	0 / 150
Absentees: • SMER-SD (1); • SNS (2); • ĽS-HZDS (2); • SDKÚ-DS (2); • KDH (3); • SMK (5)	15 / 150

== See also ==
- Fico's Second Cabinet
