= Ministry of Justice (Slovakia) =

Government ministry of Slovakia

The Ministry of Justice of the Slovak Republic is the central authority of the Slovak State Administration for the Courts and Bailiffs. The following are some of the primary goals of the Ministry:

- To prepare legislation in the areas of constitutional law, criminal law, civil law, commercial law, family law, bankruptcy law, and private international law.
- To carry out state supervision in the legally established scope over the activity of the court executors, over the activities of the Slovak Chamber of Executors, over the activities of the Notary Chamber of the Slovak Republic, and over the activity of notaries.
- To ensure the performance of expert activities, translation activities, and interpreting activities and the issuance of the Collection of Laws of the Slovak Republic and the Commercial Bulletin.
- To ensure the representation of Slovakia in the European Court of Human Rights, in the Court of Justice of the European Communities, and in the Court of First Instance of the European Communities.
- To ensure the fulfillment of tasks related to the membership of the Slovak Republic in Eurojust.

== List of ministers ==
=== Ministers of Justice of the Autonomous Government of Slovakia for the period 1938–1939 ===
#	Name	Government	Functional period	Notes
First	Ferdinand Ďurčanský	Government of Jozef Tiso	7 October 1938 – 1 December 1938	Minister for Justice, Health and Social Welfare
Second	Miloš Vančo	Second and third governments of Jozef Tiso	1 December 1938 – 9 March 1939	Minister of Justice
Third	Jozef Sivák	Government of Jozef Sivák	9 March 1939 – 11 March 1939	Prime Minister and Minister of all sectors (excluding Finance)
Fourth	Gejza Fritz	Government of Karol Sidor	11 March 1939 – 14 March 1939	Minister of Justice

=== Justice ministers in governments of first Slovak Republic for the period 1939–1945 ===
#	Name	Government	Functional period	Notes
First	Gejza Fritz	Fourth government of Jozef Tiso, Government of Vojtech Tuka	14 March 1939 – 5 September 1944	Minister of Justice
Second	Štefan Tiso	Government of Štefan Tiso	5 September 1944 – 4 April 1945	Prime Minister, Minister of Foreign Affairs and Minister of Justice

=== Committees of Justice in the Slovak Corps of the Slovak National Council in the period 1944–1960 ===
#	Name	Officers' meeting	Functional period	Notes
First	Jozef Šoltész and Ivan Pietor	ZB 1. 9. – 5. 9. 44	1 September 1944 – 5 September 1944	Orthodoxy commissioners
Second	Jozef Šoltész	ZP 5. 9. – 23. 10. 44	5 September 1944 – 23 October 1944	Judge-in-Chief (Ivan Pietor was Deputy Deputy)
Third	Ivan Štefánik	ZP 7. 2. – 21. 2. 45 ZP 21. 2. – 11. 4. 45 ZP 11. 4. – 18. 9. 45 ZP 18. 9. 45 – 16. 8. 46 ZP 16. 8. 46 – 18. 11. 47	7 February 1945 – 18 November 1947	The Justice Commissioner, from 21 February 1945, the Jury for the Judiciary, since 11 April 1945, the Jury for Justice.
Fourth	Andrej Buza	ZP 18. 11. 47 – 23. 2. 48	18 November 1947 – 26 February 1948	The Justice Commissioner. On 26 February 1948, he was dismissed.
Fifth	Julius Viktor	ZP 6. 3. – 18. 6. 48 ZP 18. 6. 48 – 17. 12. 54	6 March 1948 – 20 September 1951	The Justice Commissioner
Sixth	Rudolf Strechaj	ZP 18. 6. 48 – 17. 12. 54	20 September 1951 – 31 January 1953	The Justice Commissioner
Seventh	Juraj Uhrín	ZP 17. 12. 54 – 2. 8. 56 ZP 2. 8. 56 – 11. 7. 60	17 December 1954 – 18 December 1956	The Justice Commissioner
Eighth	Mikuláš Kapusňák	ZP 2. 8. 56 – 11. 7. 60	18 December 1956 – 13 March 1959	The Justice Commissioner
Ninth	Ladislav Gešo	ZP 2. 8. 56 – 11. 7. 60	13 March 1959 – 11 July 1960	The Justice Commissioner

=== Povereníci justice and the chairmen of the commissions of the Slovak National Council of Justice for the period 1960–1968 ===
#	Name	SNR	Functional period	Notes
First	Ladislav Gešo	SNR 1960–1964	14 July 1960 – 27 June 1963	Chief Justice and Chairman of the JRC Jurisdiction Committee
Second	Peter Colotka	SNR 1960–1964 SNR 1964-968	27 June 1963 – 29 December 1968	Chief Justice and Chairman of the JRC Jurisdiction Committee

=== Justice ministers in governments of Slovakia within the Czechoslovak Federation ===
#	Name	Government	Functional period	Notes
First	Felix Vašečka	Government of Š. Sadovsky and P. Colotka	2 January 1969 – 3 December 1970	Minister of Justice
Second	Pavol Király	Government of Š. Sadovsky and P. Colotka, First, second and third Governments of P. Colotka	3 December 1970 – 30 November 1982	Minister of Justice
Third	Ján Pješčak	Third government of P. Colotka, Government of P. Colotka, I. Knotka and P. Hrivnák	30 November 1982 – 20 April 1988	Minister of Justice.
Fourth	Milan Čič	Government of P. Colotka, I. Knotka and P. Hrivnák	20 April 1988 – 8 December 1989	Minister of Justice
Fifth	Ladislav Košťa	Government of Milan Čič, first government of Vladimír Mečiar	12 December 1989 – 22 April 1991	Minister of Justice
Sixth	Marian Posluch	Government of Ján Čarnogurský	23 April 1991 – 24 June 1992	Minister of Justice
Seventh	Katarína Tóthová [1st female]	Second government of Vladimír Mečiar	24 June 1992 – 31 December 1992	Minister of Justice. After the dissolution of the federation, she continued as a minister in the government of independent Slovakia.

=== Ministers of Justice of independent Slovakia ===
#	Name	Government	Functional period	Notes
First	Katarína Tóthová	Second government of Vladimír Mečiar	1 January 1993 – 15 March 1994	Minister of Justice
Second	Milan Hanzel	Government of Jozef Moravčík	15 March 1994 – 13 December 1994	Minister of Justice
Third	Jozef Liščák	Third government of Vladimír Mečiar	13 December 1994 – 30 October 1998	Minister of Justice
Fourth	Jan Čarnogurský	First government of Mikuláš Dzurinda	30 October 1998 – 15 October 2002	Minister of Justice
Fifth	Daniel Lipšic	Second government of Mikuláš Dzurinda	16 October 2002 – 8 February 2006	Deputy Prime Minister and Minister of Justice
Sixth	Lucia Žitňanská	Second government of Mikuláš Dzurinda	8 February 2006 – 4 July 2006	Deputy Prime Minister and Minister of Justice
Seventh	Štefan Harabin	First government of Robert Fico	4 July 2006 – 23 June 2009	Deputy Prime Minister and Minister of Justice
Eighth	Robert Fico	First government of Robert Fico	26 June 2009 – 3 July 2009	Temporarily charged with management
Ninth	Viera Petríková	First government of Robert Fico	3 July 2009 – 8 July 2010	Deputy Prime Minister and Minister of Justice
Tenth	Lucia Žitňanská	Government of Iveta Radičová	9 July 2010 – 4 April 2012	Minister of Justice
Eleventh	Tomáš Borec	Second government of Robert Fico	4 April 2012 – 23 March 2016	Minister of Justice
Twelfth	Lucia Žitňanská	Third government of Robert Fico	23 March 2016 – 22 March 2018	Deputy Prime Minister and Minister of Justice
Thirteenth	Gábor Gál	Government of Peter Pellegrini	22 March 2018 - 21 March 2020	Minister of Justice
Fourteenth	Mária Kolíková	Government of Igor Matovič	from 21 March 2020	Minister of Justice
Fifteenth	Viliam Karas	Government of Eduard Heger	from 13 September 2022	Minister of Justice
Sixteenth	Jana Dubovcová	Government of Ľudovír Ódor	from 15 April 2023	Minister of Justice

== See also ==
- Justice ministry
- Zoznam ministrov spravodlivosti Slovenskej republiky (List of ministers of justice of the Slovak Republic)
- Politics of Slovakia
