= Robert Kaliňák =

Slovak politician

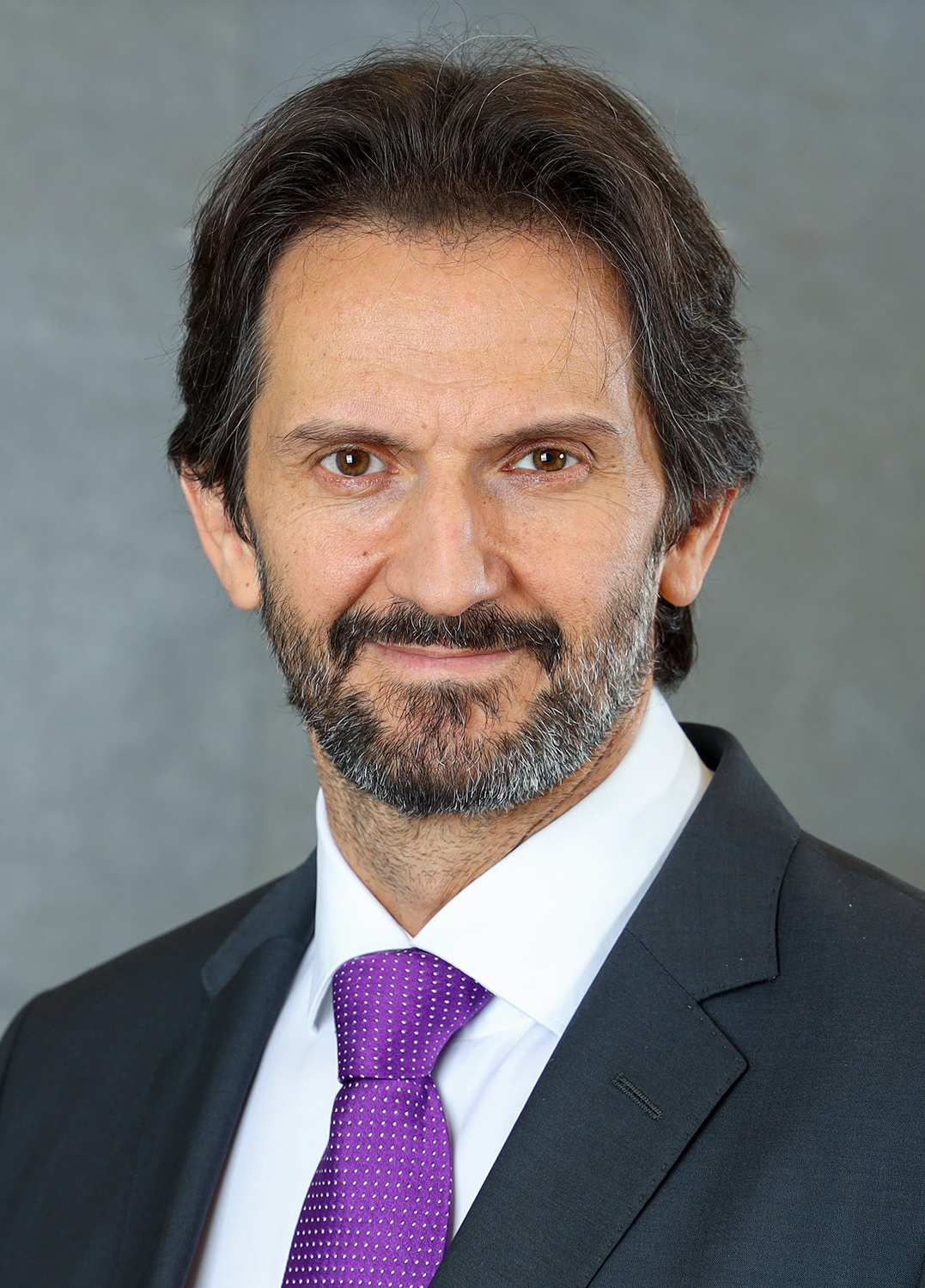
- Kaliňák in 2023

Deputy Prime Minister of Slovakia
- Incumbent
- Assumed office 25 October 2023 Serving with Peter Kmec, Denisa Saková and Tomáš Taraba
- Prime Minister: Robert Fico
- In office 4 April 2012 – 22 March 2018 Serving with Peter Kažimír, Miroslav Lajčák, Ľubomír Vážny, Peter Pellegrini, Lucia Žitňanská and Gabriela Matečná
- Prime Minister: Robert Fico
- In office 4 July 2006 – 8 July 2010 Serving with Dušan Čaplovič, Ján Mikolaj, Štefan Harabin and Viera Petríková
- Prime Minister: Robert Fico

Minister of Defence
- Incumbent
- Assumed office 25 October 2023
- Prime Minister: Robert Fico
- Preceded by: Martin Sklenár

Minister of Interior
- In office 4 April 2012 – 22 March 2018
- Prime Minister: Robert Fico
- Preceded by: Daniel Lipšic
- Succeeded by: Tomáš Drucker
- In office 4 July 2006 – 8 July 2010
- Prime Minister: Robert Fico
- Preceded by: Martin Pado
- Succeeded by: Daniel Lipšic

Member of the National Council
- In office 22 March 2018 – 31 December 2018
- In office 8 July 2010 – 4 April 2012
- In office 15 October 2002 – 4 July 2006

Personal details
- Born: 11 May 1971 (age 55) Bratislava, Czechoslovakia
- Party: Direction – Social Democracy (1999–present)
- Spouse: Zuzana Kaliňáková
- Education: Comenius University (JUDr.)

Robert Kaliňák (born 11 May 1971) is a Slovak politician who has been serving as Deputy Prime Minister of Slovakia and Minister of Defence in the Fourth cabinet of Robert Fico since 25 October 2023.

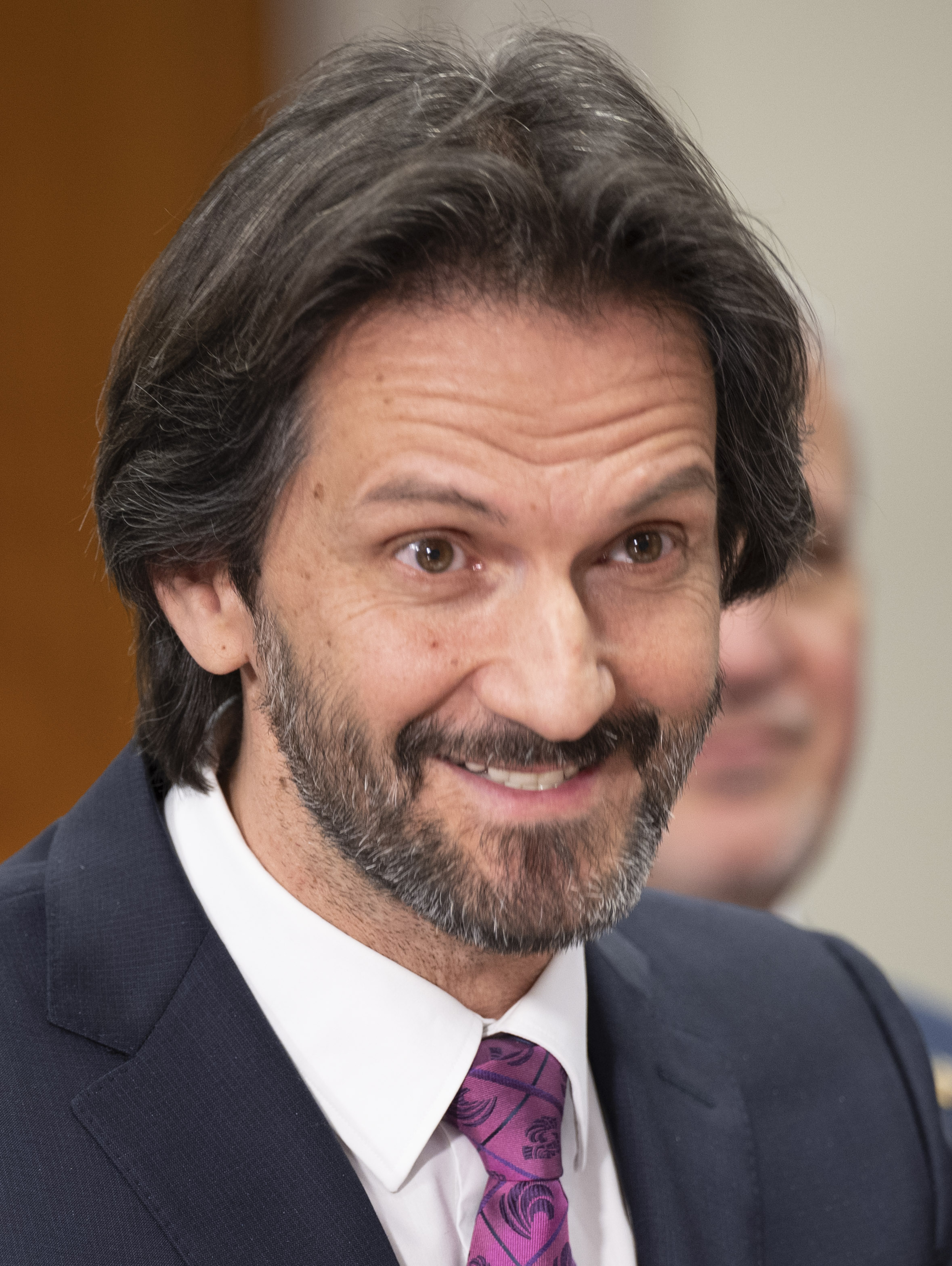
Robert Kaliňák in 2024

Kaliňák previously served as Minister of the Interior from 2006 to 2010 and again from 2012 to 2018. He is the longest serving minister in the history of modern Slovakia. He is a member of the Direction – Social Democracy party. On 31 December 2018, Kaliňák resigned his seat in the National Council, effectively retiring from politics until the 2023 parliamentary election.

== Early life and education ==
Kaliňák was born on 11 May 1971 in Bratislava. His father was a sailor and his mother, who originated from the Bulgarian minority in Odesa, worked as a teacher. Kaliňák's brother Milan is a member of the Taktici rock band, with whom Robert also played occasionally in the past.

Whilst studying, Kaliňák successfully entered the world of entrepreneurship in 1990 by opening a student restaurant, a publishing house and printing office of scholarly literature. During his studies, he also started his career in a law office in 1992. Kaliňák and his partners established a chain of restaurants called Steam & Coffee in 1999, while he engaged also in other lines of business. After entering politics, he retired as an executive from all business activities.

== Political career ==
Whilst Kaliňák was holding the post of Minister of Interior, he faced several criticisms from the side of opposition regarding his purchase of shares from shareholder, who was later investigated for tax fraud. Kaliňák resigned as an interior minister as well as the PM deputy on 22 March 2018 after the murder of an investigative reporter Ján Kuciak.

In September 2025, Kalinak was fined by the parliamentary conflict of interest committee for deliberately omitting his family's vacation villa on the island of Pag in Croatia from his asset disclosure. He was criticized for defending his decision to conceal the property and for the perceived double standard.
