= Krčméry =

Krčméry is a Slovak surname. Notable people with the surname include:

- Štefan Krčméry (1892–1955), Slovak poet
- Vladimír Krčméry (1960–2022), Slovak physician
