= Ľudmila Mušková =

Slovak politician

Member of the National Council
- In office 1994–2010

Personal details
- Born: 7 January 1949
- Party: People's Party – Movement for a Democratic Slovakia
- Occupation: teacher

Ľudmila Mušková (born 7 January 1949) is a Slovak politician and former member of the National Council of Slovakia. Mušková served as a member of parliament from 2002 to 2006 as a member of the People's Party – Movement for a Democratic Slovakia.

== Early life ==
Ľudmila Mušková was born 7 January 1949. In 1969, she competed in the Miss Czechoslovakia competition, finishing fifth. She studied pedagogy in university and worked as a teacher before beginning a career in politics. She met her husband, academic artist Pavel Muška, on a bench in high school. Today she lives in the town of Kysucké Nové Mesto.

== Political life ==
Muskova was elected in the 2002 Slovak parliamentary election as part of Vladimír Mečiar's Movement for a Democratic Slovakia. During this time, she built a profile around education. When the government tried to introduce tuition fees for university students in 2004, Muskova argued that students would bear the financial burden of these fees without a guarantee that school quality would improve.

Muskova worked on a variety of pieces of legislation while in office, including bills to inform parents when their underage daughter has had an abortion, penalties against businesses caught selling alcohol to underage children, and compensation for those who were forcibly vaccinated. In the National Council, she had the respect of her colleagues for being a politician who was not tainted by scandal. Direction – Social Democracy MP Dušan Jarjabek called her extremely modest and easy to communicate with, while Július Brock of the Christian Democratic Movement suggested that if she wasn't a supporter of Meciar, that she would fit right in with his party.

Muskova declined to run again in the 2010 Slovak parliamentary election, citing a desire to spend more time with her grandchildren.
