= Vladimír Krčméry =

Slovak physician (1960–2022)

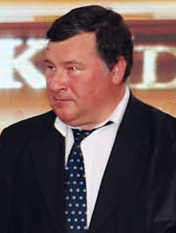
- Krčméry in 2012
- Born: 23 June 1960; Bratislava, Czechoslovakia
- Died: 20 December 2022 (aged 62); Bratislava, Slovakia
- Education: Comenius University
- Scientific career
- Fields: Tropical medicine, infectious diseases
- Workplaces: St. Elizabeth University of Health and Social Work

Vladimír Krčméry ([ˈvl̩a.di.miːr ˈkr̩tʂ.meː.ri]; 23 July 1960 – 20 December 2022) was a Slovak physician, humanitarian and academic.

== Family background ==
Krčméry was born in Bratislava to a Catholic family. His uncle Silvester Krčméry was among the leaders of the Catholic dissent, working underground in the opposition to the Communist regime and spending much of his life in prison.

== Career ==
Krčméry completed his medical degree from the Comenius University in 1985, after which he worked at the university hospital. Krčméry also completed a PhD at the university in 1990. Following the Velvet Revolution, he contributed to the restoration of the University of Trnava. As a doctor, he became known as a prominent specialist in the area of tropical medicine. In 2007 he was awarded an honorary doctorate by the University of Scranton.

Krčméry was the founder of the St. Elizabeth University of Health and Social Work (SEU), which trained medical and social work professionals. Krčméry used the college as a basis for his humanitarian work, setting up medical facilities across the developing world, including in Kenya, Cambodia and Haiti. Since 2015, the college became active in providing medical assistance to refugees travelling through Slovakia as well as Balkan countries. Although it received widespread praise for its humanitarian work, the college was also criticised for awarding PhD degrees to a large number of prominent physicians and politicians, including former EU Commissioner Ján Figeľ as well as former ministers Andrea Kalavská and Viera Tomanová, with no academic achievements.

=== COVID-19 pandemic ===
Krčméry was a prominent member of the government advisory team during the COVID-19 pandemic. He was the first person to receive a COVID-19 vaccine in Slovakia. Due to his prominent role in the vaccination campaign, Krčméry and his family became a target of anti-vaxxers, who physically threatened him and his family.

== Personal life and death ==
Krčméry was married to fellow physician Terézia. They had four children together. In addition, the couple adopted two HIV-positive orphans in Cambodia.

Krčméry died on 20 December 2022 in Bratislava from complications associated with pneumonia. After his death, several politicians praised his life achievements. President Zuzana Čaputová stressed Krčméry's devotion to helping the poor around the world. Prime Minister Eduard Heger likewise praised Krčméry for his work to help "the poorest of the poor".
