= Hugo Sonnenschein =

Hugo Sonnenschein may refer to:

- Hugo Sonnenschein (writer) (1889–1953), Austrian writer
- Hugo F. Sonnenschein (1940–2021), American economist and academic administrator
