= Dušan Čaplovič =

Slovak politician (1946–2025)

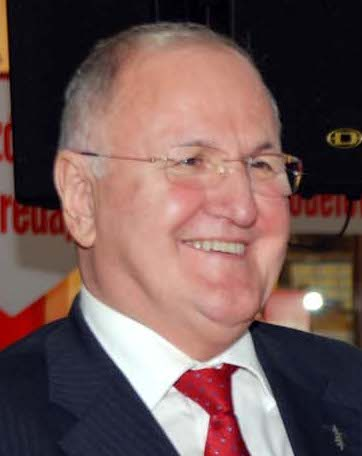

Minister of Education
- In office 4 April 2012 – 3 July 2014
- Prime Minister: Robert Fico
- Preceded by: Eugen Jurzyca
- Succeeded by: Peter Pellegrini

Deputy Prime Minister
- In office 4 July 2006 – 8 July 2010 Serving with Štefan Harabin, Robert Kaliňák, Ján Mikolaj, Viera Petríková
- Prime Minister: Robert Fico

Personal details
- Born: 18 September 1946 Bratislava, Czechoslovakia
- Died: 6 March 2025 (aged 78)
- Party: Direction – Slovak Social Democracy; Communist Party of Czechoslovakia
- Spouse: Mária Čaplovičová (div. 1983)
- Children: 2
- Education: Comenius University

Dušan Čaplovič (18 September 1946 – 6 March 2025) was a Slovak politician, historian and archaeologist. In 2006–2010, he was the Deputy Prime Minister for Knowledge Society, European Affairs, Human Rights and Minorities. Čaplovič was also vice-chairman of Direction – Social Democracy.

== Life and career ==
Čaplovič was a member of editorial boards of several national and international historical and archaeological journals.

He joined the Communist Party in 1970. From 2001, he was the vice-president of Direction – Social Democracy that the first operated under the name SMER - Social Democracy in January 2005. Additionally he was a member of the presidency of Direction – Social Democracy. He was shadow minister for Education, Science and Culture in 2002. In 2002, he was elected to the National Council. He was a member of the Parliamentary Committee on Conflicts of Interest and the Committee on Education, Science, Sports and Youth, Culture and Media.

Čaplovič was the Deputy Prime Minister for Knowledge, Society, European Affairs, Human Rights and Minorities from 2006. He pledged a coalition with the SNS and the HZDS. After the demission of Environment Minister Jan Chrbet (SNS), Prime Minister Robert Fico refused the SNS-nominee Karol Gordik and Dušan Čaplovič became interim Environment Minister. On 28 October 2009, President Ivan Gašparovič appointed Jozef Medveď as the new Environment Minister.

Čaplovič died on 6 March 2025, at the age of 78.

== Works ==
- Osídlenie Ostrej skaly nad Vyšným Kubínom, in: AVANS v r. 1977, Nitra 1978.
- Orava v praveku, vo včasnej dobe dejinnej a na začiatku stredoveku, Martin 1987.
- The Situation of Archaeological Research of Middle Ages. Agricultural Settlements in the Territory of Slovakia, in: Ruralia I, 1996.
- Etnické zmeny a vývoj stredovekého osídlenia v juhovýchodných oblastiach karpatského oblúku (9.-12. storočie), in: Początki sąsiedztwa. Pogranicze etniczne polsko-rusko-słowackie w średniowieczu. Rzeszów 1996.
- Oblasti východných Karpát a horného Potisia za panovania Svätopluka I. In: Svätopluk I. 894–1994. Nitra 1997.
- Včasnostredoveké osídlenie Slovenska, Bratislava 1998.
- Osmičky v našich dejinách (Perfekt Brat. 1999).
- Dokumenty slovenskej národnej identity a štátnosti I., II. (Národné literárne centrum Brat. 1998).
- Dejiny Slovenska. With: Viliam Čičaj, Ľubomír Lipták, Ján Lukačka.
