= Průkopník svobody =

- Type: Weekly (1918-1926), Twice weekly (1926-1929)
- Publisher: Communist Party of Austria (1921-1929)
- Editor: Václav Škrvně
- Founded: 1918
- Ceased publication: 1929
- Political alignment: Socialist (1918-1921), Communist (1921-1929)
- Language: Czech language
- Headquarters: Vienna

Průkopník svobody ('Pioneer of Freedom') was a Czech language newspaper published from Vienna, Austria. Průkopník svobody appeared weekly between 1918 and 1926, and bi-weekly 1926–1929. The slogan of the newspaper was Workers of all countries, unite!

== History ==
Průkopník svobody had been published as 'the organ of the Czech Social Democratic Workers (Centralists) in German Austria' ('Centralists' was a name used for the Czech Social Democrats who had belonged to the Social Democratic Workers Party of Austria, rather than the Czechoslav Social Democratic Workers Party). The editorial board of Průkopník svobody belonged to the leftwing of the Austrian Social Democracy, and in 1920 the newspaper was identified as pro-Bolshevik in correspondence of the Communist International. From 1921 onwards, Průkopník svobody was the organ of the Czech communists in the Republic of Austria. The Czech Section of the Communist Party of Austria had its offices in the Ninth District.

Due to the weakness of the Czech Section of the Communist Party of Austria, the paper was closed down in 1929. The last regular issue came out on September 14, 1929. On November 3, 1930, a special electoral campaign issue was published.

Václav Škrvně was the last editor and publisher of Průkopník svobody. The writer Hugo Sonnenschein (a poet who wrote under the pseudonym 'Brother Sonka') had been a contributor to the paper.
