= Andrea Kalavská =

Slovak physician

Minister of Health
- In office 22 March 2018 – 17 December 2019
- Prime Minister: Peter Pellegrini
- Preceded by: Tomáš Drucker
- Succeeded by: Peter Pellegrini (acting); Marek Krajčí

Personal details
- Born: 18 November 1977 (age 48) Trenčín, Czechoslovakia
- Spouse: Erich Kalavský
- Children: 1
- Education: Comenius University; University of Trnava; Slovak Medical University

Andrea Kalavská, (née Augustínová; born 28 November 1977) is a Slovak physician and politician. She served as the Minister of Health between 2018 and 2019. Prior to that she served as a State Secretary at the Health Ministry under minister Tomáš Drucker. On 9 December 2019, she resigned after her healthcare reform proposals failed the approval process in the parliament.

== Early life ==
Kalavská graduated in medicine from the Comenius University in 2003. She obtained her PhD. in public health from the University of Trnava and Master of Health Administration from the Slovak Medical University. In 2020, the Radio and Television of Slovakia broadcast an investigative piece accusing Kalavská of plagiarism in her doctoral thesis. Following the broadcast, the investigative show was discontinued.

As a doctor, she worked at hospitals in Trnava and Bratislava. She teaches at the Slovak Medical University.

== After politics ==
Following the 2020 Slovak parliamentary election, she served as a special advisor to the Prime Minister Igor Matovič for handling the COVID-19 pandemic.

In 2025, Kalavská became the medical director for the Agel company, which operates hospitals in Slovakia.
