= Juraj Draxler =

Slovak politician

Minister of Education, Science, Research and Sport
- In office 25 November 2014 – 23 March 2016
- Prime Minister: Robert Fico
- Preceded by: Peter Pellegrini
- Succeeded by: Peter Plavčan

Personal details
- Born: 13 December 1975 (age 50) Bratislava, Czechoslovakia
- Children: 1
- Education: Jacobs University Bremen; University of York

Juraj Draxler (born 13 December 1975 in Bratislava) is a Slovak Political Scientist and Politician. Between 2014 and 2016 he served as the Minister of Education, Science, Research and Sports of Slovakia as a nominee, but not a member, of the Direction – Slovak Social Democracy party.

== Early life ==
Draxler studied integrated social sciences at the Jacobs University Bremen and Political Science at University of York. He worked as a Reuters correspondent, Centre for European Policy Studies researcher and professor at the Anglo-American University and the University of New York in Prague.

== Political career ==
In 2014 he became advisor of the Minister of Education. Between September and November 2014, he served as the State Secretary for Education under the Education Minister Peter Pellegrini. After Pellegrini became the Speaker of the National Council (Slovakia), Draxler replaced him as a minister. He did not return to government after the 2016 Slovak parliamentary election.

== Personal life ==
Following his terms as a minister, Draxler worked as a Head of the Institute of Strategic Analysis at the Slovak Academy of Sciences. In 2017, he announced birth of a daughter with his long-term partner from Bulgaria. In 2016, published a novel called Petra.
