= Tomáš Drucker =

Slovak politician

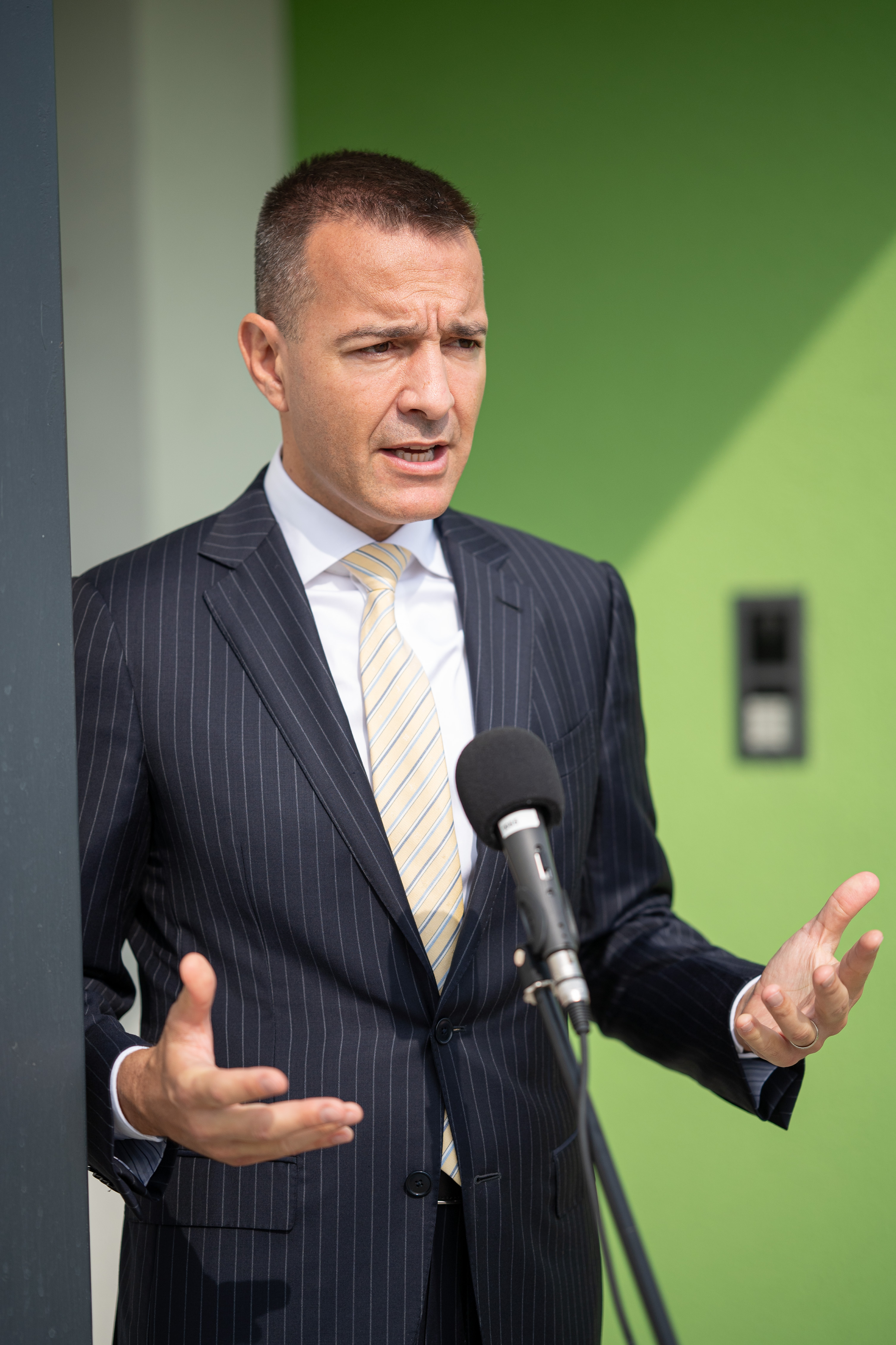
- Drucker in 2024

Deputy Prime Minister for the Recovery Plan and Knowledge Economy
- Acting
- Assumed office 19 November 2025
- Prime Minister: Robert Fico
- Preceded by: Peter Kmec

Minister of Education, Research, Development and Youth of Slovakia
- Incumbent
- Assumed office 25 October 2023
- Prime Minister: Robert Fico
- Preceded by: Daniel Bútora

Minister of Interior
- In office 22 March 2018 – 17 April 2018
- Prime Minister: Peter Pellegrini
- Preceded by: Robert Kaliňák
- Succeeded by: Peter Pellegrini (acting)

Minister of Health
- In office 23 March 2016 – 22 March 2018
- Prime Minister: Robert Fico
- Preceded by: Viliam Čislák
- Succeeded by: Andrea Kalavská

Personal details
- Born: 20 July 1978 (age 48) Bratislava, Czechoslovakia (now Slovakia)
- Party: Voice – Social Democracy (2023–present)
- Other political affiliations: Independent (2016–2019); Good Choice (2019–2023)
- Children: 2
- Education: Slovak University of Technology in Bratislava; University of Trnava; London Business School

Tomáš Drucker (born 20 July 1978) is a Slovak manager and politician who has served as Deputy Prime Minister for the Recovery Plan and Knowledge Economy and as Minister of Education. From 2016 to 2018, he served as the Minister of Health and subsequently the Minister of Interior Affairs for less than a month in March and April 2018. He is a graduate of the London Business School's Sloan program.

== Early life ==
Drucker studied computer science at the Slovak University of Technology in Bratislava and law at the University of Trnava. In 2023, he obtained the Sloan Master in Management and Leadership (MSc Sloan) from the London Business School.

== Business career ==
Between 1997 and 2012, Drucker worked in the private sector in management positions while having served on boards of various public enterprises from 2006.

In 2012, Drucker became the CEO of Slovenská pošta, a state-run mail service giant, which he managed to make profitable while avoiding large-scale layoffs. Drucker made a fundamental impact on the positive management whilst creating new areas of provided services.

In 2016, Drucker received the Forbes magazine and consulting firm PwC award "The Most Respected CEO 2016".

== Political career ==
As Minister of Health, Drucker focused on digitalization of the Slovak healthcare system. In the first six months, he filed seven criminal reports, canceled contracts for approximately 18 million euros and the delivery of the insured's smart card information system. Later, Drucker summarized his work in TA3 as follows: "We implement changes in the field of hospital management, which means that there is a standard collective body today."

Following the Murder of Ján Kuciak, Drucker was tasked to restore the credibility of the interior affairs ministry. Nonetheless, he resigned after less than a month arguing he did not see himself as an authentic unifying figure that is needed to do the job.

In August 2019, Drucker announced formation of a new party Good Choice and became its leader. The party received 3.06% in the 2020 Slovak parliamentary election, well short of the 5% representation threshold but just enough to pass the 3% threshold, making political parties eligible for public funding. He resigned as a party leader in 2022 to focus on obtaining the Master of Science in Leadership and Strategy degree (MSc Sloan) in London. Drucker ran on the Voice list in the 2023 Slovak parliamentary election and subsequently became the minister of education.

At the end of October 2023, Drucker became the Minister of Education, Research, Development, and Youth of Slovakia. He continued the work of his predecessors by advancing the new curricular reform for elementary schools. He introduced a program of changes encompassing 40 projects, including changes in kindergarten funding, secondary school reform, university funding, desegregation, and inclusion. Drucker aimed to support the mental health of children and teachers. In 2024, he implemented the so-called compensatory allowances for teachers, which caused discontent among some educators.

In autumn 2024, he introduced a reform package titled The Velvet Revolution in Education, which included shifting kindergarten funding from municipalities to the state, implementing a new system for lifelong learning, banning mobile phones in elementary schools, and introducing reforms in desegregation, mental health, education for foreigners, debureaucratization, and secondary school optimization. The reforms received support from both the ruling coalition and the opposition.

A year later, in the autumn of 2025, he pushed through a package of seven education laws, regarded as the most extensive school reform in decades. The reform introduced compulsory pre-primary education for children from the age of three, a new system of desegregated public school districts with a guaranteed right to a place in kindergarten and primary school. It restructured school funding based on the provision of public service, made mathematics a mandatory subject in the school-leaving exam, and modernized vocational education, including the establishment of centers of excellence, dual education, and digital training.

The new Higher Education Act introduced flexible bachelor’s and short-cycle programs, sabbaticals for academic staff, mandatory doctoral schools, and the option to replace final theses with professional practice. The reform also focused on developing digital educational content and regulations for the use of artificial intelligence in schools, strengthened the safety of students and teachers, and transformed diagnostic and re-education institutions. It also included a unified electronic application system and new rules for teachers’ professional development and remuneration.

Changes in the funding of church and private schools tied to the condition of providing education as a public service sparked criticism and concerns among parts of the public about restrictions on their autonomy.

As education minister and acting Deputy Prime Minister for the Knowledge Economy, Drucker also introduced reforms of Slovakia’s research and innovation system, including a revised national R&D strategy focused on support for startups, technology transfer, and closer cooperation between academia and industry.

== Personal life ==
Drucker is married with two children. Matúš Šutaj Eštok described Drucker as a conservative and a practicing Roman Catholic.

His family background also includes Jewish ancestry through his father. His paternal grandparents, Dezider Drucker and Katarína Friedmann, were Holocaust survivors. Dezider survived Auschwitz and Mühldorf and was the only member of his immediate family to survive the Holocaust; his parents, two sisters, and twin brother Alexander were killed.
