= Gejza Fritz =

Slovak lawyer and politician

Gejza Fritz (19 September 1880 – 20 February 1957) was a Slovak lawyer and politician.

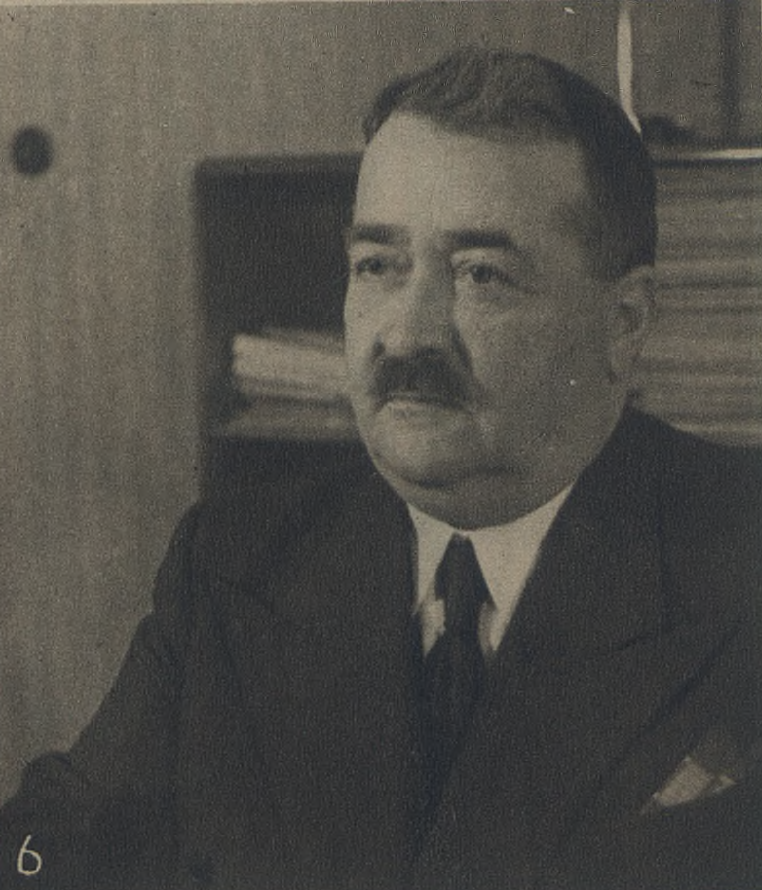
Gejza Fritz

== Life and Career ==
Fritz was born 19 September 1880 to Jakub Fritz and Elisabeth née Focht in Solivar. Following his education, he became a candidate for law in Prešov. He did not stay in this position for a long time and moved to the judiciary. Subsequently, he became a judge and gradually worked at the courts in Prešov, Levoča, Turčiansky Svätý Martin and Turčianske Teplice. He continued his career as a judge after the establishment of Czechoslovakia in 1918.

On March 11, 1939, he became the minister of justice of autonomous Slovakia. He held this title for the majority of World War II, until 5 September 1944, when Štefan Tiso was elected to the role.

He lived out his life in Solivar, where he died on February 20, 1957.
