= 2018 Prague Military Parade =

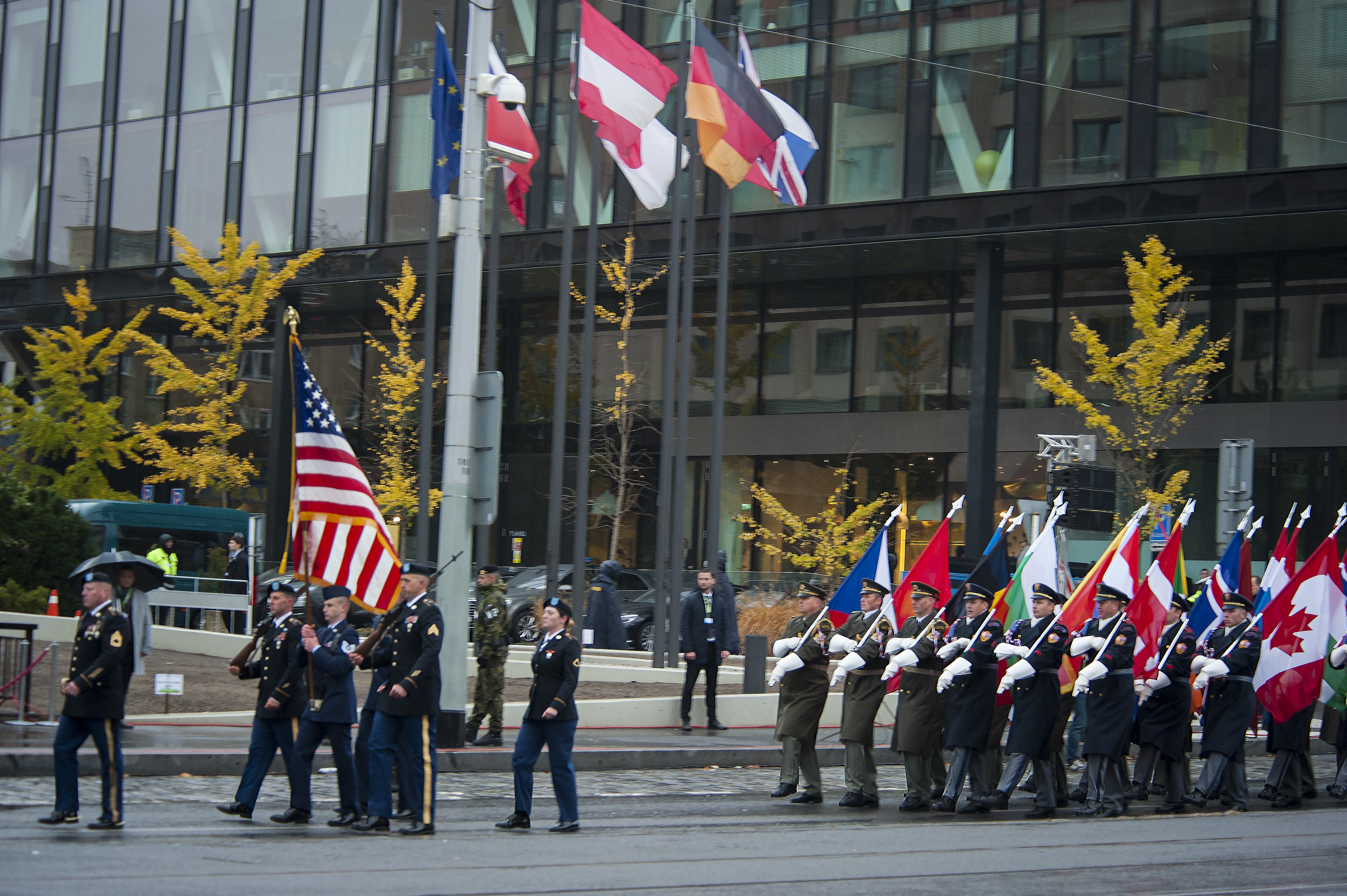
- American troops flanked by a massed Czech color guard during the parade.
- Native name: Czech: 2018 Pražská vojenská přehlídka
- Date: 28 October 2018 (2-3 pm)
- Location: European Street, Prague, Czech Republic
- Also known as: Parade 2018
- Participants: Czech Republic; Slovakia; Italy; France; United States; United Kingdom

The Prague Military Parade of 2018 was a military parade in the Czech Republic which took place on Prague's Evropská Street on 28 October 2018. It took place as part of the 3-day centennial celebrations of the founding of Czechoslovakia in 1918. The parade was the first of its kind in 10 years and the largest in the country since the 1985 Victory Parade. It saw over 4,000 Czech and Slovak military personnel take part in the event, which included troops from the United Kingdom, France, Italy and the United States. Czech President Milos Zeman presided over the parade as foreign dignitaries, such as Slovak Prime Minister Peter Pellegrini and U.S Defense Secretary James Mattis watched.
