= Častkovce =

Village in western Slovakia

- Municipality
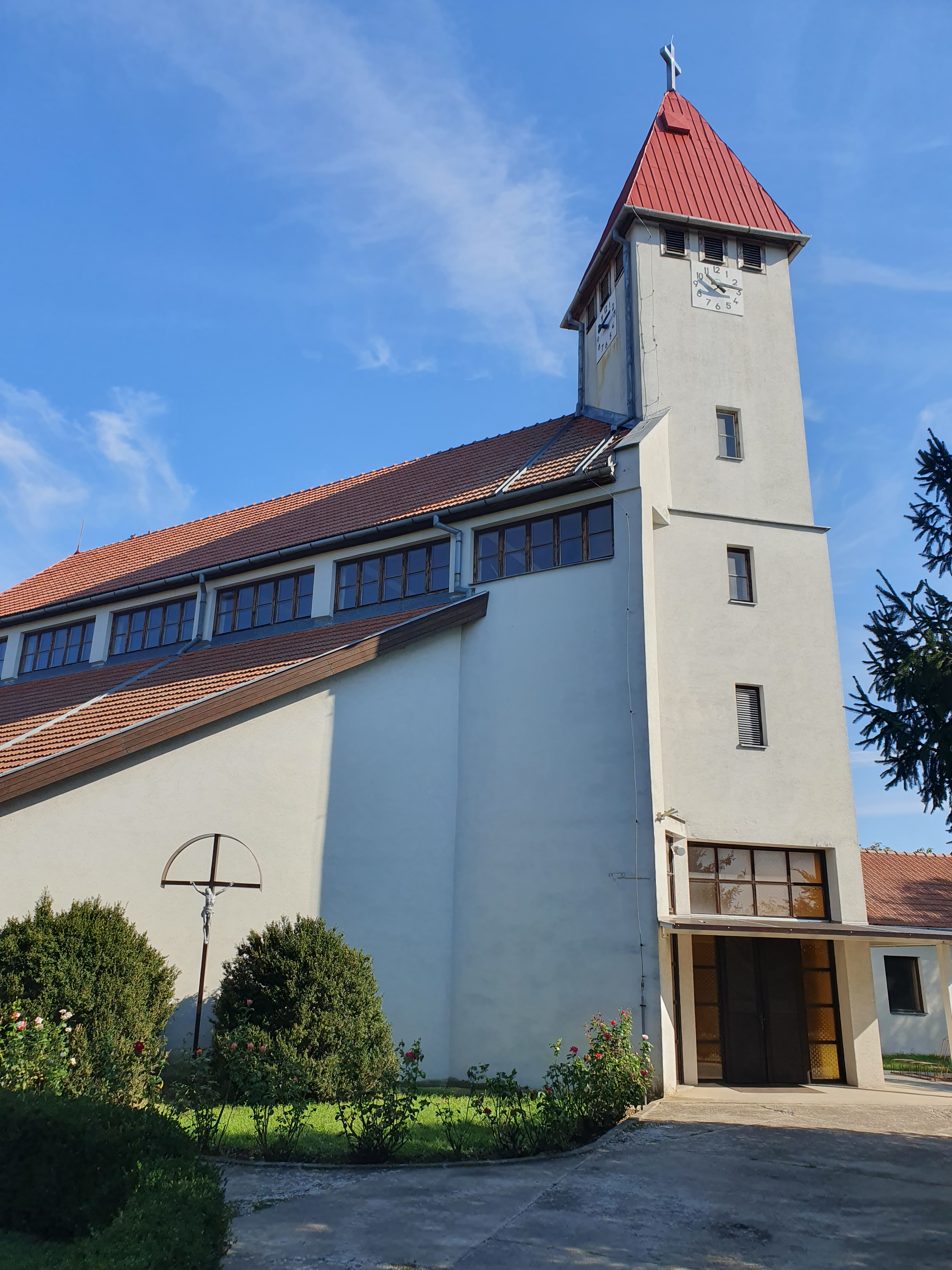

- Flag

- Location of Častkovce in the Trenčín Region Location of Častkovce in Slovakia
- Coordinates: 48.68°N 17.78°E
- Country: Slovakia
- Region: Trenčín Region
- District: Nové Mesto nad Váhom District
- First mentioned: 1392

Government
  - Mayor: Dušan Bublavý

Area
  - Total: 7.57 km^{2} (2.92 sq mi)
- Elevation: 177 m (581 ft)

Population (2025)
  - Total: 1,723
- Time zone: UTC+1 (CET)
  - Summer (DST): UTC+2 (CEST)
- Postal code: 916 27
- Area code: +421 32
- Vehicle registration plate (until 2022): NM
- Website: obeccastkovce.webnode.sk

Častkovce (Hungarian: Császtó, German: Czastkowitz) is a village and municipality in Nové Mesto nad Váhom District in the Trenčín Region of western Slovakia.

== History ==
In historical records the village was first mentioned in 1392. Before the establishment of independent Czechoslovakia in 1918, Častkovce was part of Nyitra County within the Kingdom of Hungary. From 1939 to 1945, it was part of the Slovak Republic.

== Geography ==
The municipality lies at an altitude of 177 metres (581 ft) and covers an area of 7.57 km^{2} (2.92 sq mi) (2025).

== Population ==
Population statistic (10 years)
Year	1995	2005	2015	2025
Count	985	1013	1347	1723
Difference		+2.84%	+32.97%	+27.91%

Population statistic
Year	2024	2025
Count	1719	1723
Difference		+0.23%

It has a population of 1723 people (31 December 2025).

=== Ethnicity ===
Census 2021 (1+ %)
Ethnicity	Number	Fraction
Slovak	1598	97.49%
Romani	38	2.31%
Not found out	29	1.76%
Total	1639	

In year 2021 was 1639 people by ethnicity 1598 as Slovak, 38 as Romani, 29 as Not found out, 16 as Czech, 7 as Ukrainian, 7 as Hungarian, 5 as German, 4 as Other, 2 as French, 1 as Turkish, 1 as Austrian, 1 as Polish and 1 as English.

Note on population: The difference values of population numbers in the table "Population statistic" and in the sections "Ethnicity" & "Religion" is caused by the use of various statistical methods.

=== Religion ===
Census 2021 (1+ %)
Religion	Number	Fraction
Roman Catholic Church	1139	69.49%
None	373	22.76%
Evangelical Church	62	3.78%
Not found out	22	1.34%
Total	1639	

In year 2021 was 1639 people by religion 1139 from Roman Catholic Church, 373 from None, 62 from Evangelical Church, 22 from Not found out, 10 from Greek Catholic Church, 5 from Christian Congregations in Slovakia, 5 from Islam, 5 from Hinduism, 5 from Apostolic Church, 5 from Ad hoc movements, 2 from Old Catholic Church, 2 from Eastern Orthodox Church, 2 from Other and not ascertained christian church and 2 from United Methodist Church.

== Genealogical resources ==
The records for genealogical research are available at the state archive "Statny Archiv in Bratislava, Slovakia"

- Roman Catholic church records (births/marriages/deaths): 1705-1907 (parish B)
- Lutheran church records (births/marriages/deaths): 1871-1922 (parish B)

== See also ==
- List of municipalities and towns in Slovakia
