= Ján Figeľ =

Slovak politician (born 1960)

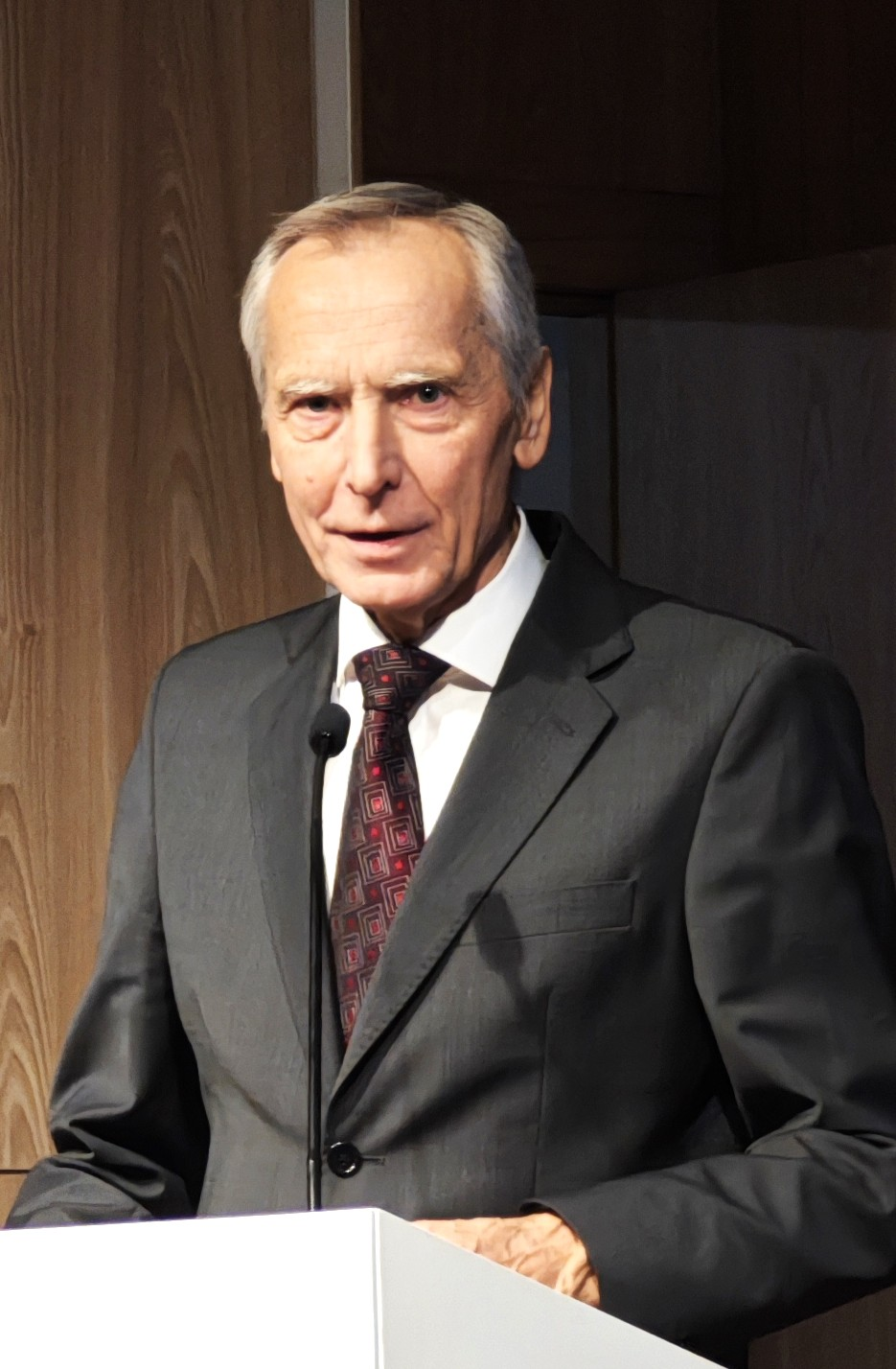
- Figeľ in 2011

European Commissioner for Education, Training, Culture and Youth
- In office 1 January 2007 – 1 October 2009
- President: José Manuel Barroso
- Preceded by: Himself (Education, Training, Culture and Multilingualism)
- Succeeded by: Maroš Šefčovič

European Commissioner for Education, Training, Culture and Multilingualism
- In office 22 November 2004 – 1 January 2007
- President: José Manuel Barroso
- Preceded by: Viviane Reding; Dalia Grybauskaitė (Education and Culture)
- Succeeded by: Himself (Education, Training, Culture and Youth); Leonard Orban (Multilingualism)

European Commissioner for Enterprise and Information Society
- In office 1 May 2004 – 22 November 2004; Served with Erkki Liikanen, Olli Rehn
- President: Romano Prodi
- Preceded by: Erkki Liikanen
- Succeeded by: Günter Verheugen (Enterprise and Industry); Viviane Reding (Information Society and Media)

Personal details
- Born: 20 January 1960 (age 66) Čaklov, Czechoslovakia (now Slovakia)
- Party: Christian Democratic Movement
- Spouse: Mária Figeľová
- Children: 4
- Education: Technical University of Košice

Ján Figeľ (born 20 January 1960) is a Slovak politician who served as European Commissioner from 2004 to 2009, then as Slovak Minister of Transport from 2010 to 2012.

From 2016 to 2019, Figeľ was European Commission special envoy for the promotion of freedom of religion outside the EU.

== Political career ==
Following his election as the leader of the Christian Democratic Movement in Slovakia, Figeľ announced his resignation from the Commission on 21 September 2009. He was replaced by Maroš Šefčovič on 1 October 2009.

In 2007, Figeľ received a PhD in the field of social work at St. Elizabeth's School of Medicine and Social Work in Bratislava, a university-level private academic institution. The majority of the thesis was copied from a publication he edited in 2003 with Slovak diplomat Miroslav Adamiš, "Slovakia on the Road to the European Union – Chapters and Contexts", in which they described the country's EU accession process. The rector of St Elizabeth's School, Vladimír Krčméry, said that they took into consideration Figeľ's position and had granted Figeľ a PhD mainly due to the fact that he was at the time serving as a European Commissioner.

On 24 August 2012, Science Insider reported that Figeľ was facing an official inquiry into the legitimacy of his PhD. awarded while he was in office.

=== Slovak Minister of Transport ===
From 2010 to 2012, Figeľ was a Slovak Deputy Prime Minister and Minister for Transport, Construction and Regional Development.

Figeľ was chairman of the Christian Democratic Movement (KDH) from 19 September 2009 until 15 March 2016, when he resigned as party leader following unsuccessful general elections when KDH took just 4.96 percent of the vote and, as a result, the Christian Democrats did not win any seats in the parliament for the first time since they were established in 1990 and paid the price for not passing the baton to a new generation. Furthermore, Figeľ created a controversy with an electoral campaign focusing on anti immigration and nationalist rhetoric with a slogan about "white Slovakia". In May 2019, he ran for European Parliament elections but, receiving only 23792 preferential votes, he was not elected.

In autumn 2010, Slovak media raised controversy regarding Figeľ's generous EU perks making him a politician with best revenues in Slovakia. Furthermore, daily newspaper Sme recalled that in 2001, when his party colleague Andrej Ďurkovský was Bratislava's Old City district Mayor, Figeľ obtained a social housing apartment in downtown Bratislava for almost nothing (156 sq meters for 1.813 €). Prime Minister of Slovakia Iveta Radičová said that if Figeľ had taken any different course of action it would have harmed the whole ruling coalition, since she could not use the justification employed by her predecessor Robert Fico who dismissed scandals connected to his coalition partners by saying that they were their own business.

=== Special Envoy for the promotion of freedom of religion or belief outside the European Union ===
Following unsuccessful 2016 Slovak parliamentary election, Figeľ resigned as chairman of the Christian Democratic Movement (KDH), and was then appointed Special Envoy for the promotion of freedom of religion or belief outside the European Union by European Commission President Jean-Claude Juncker on 6 May.

The European Parliament supported and had called for this initiative in its Resolution of 4 February 2016. During his mandate, Figeľ reported to the European Commission Vice-President Frans Timmermans who was then responsible for the dialogue with churches and faith-based organisation (Art.17 TFEU). He served in this position as Special Adviser to the Commissioner for International Cooperation and Development, Neven Mimica. His mandate expired with the end of term of Juncker Commission on 30 November 2019. After a vacancy of this position during almost three years, the European Commission appointed Figeľ's successor, Frans Van Daele, 7 December 2022. According to ADF International, religious freedom advocates welcomed this decision as they had "criticized the apparent reticence to fill the role in light of increasing pressure on religious freedom worldwide".

In January 2018, during his visit to Pakistan, Figeľ's claim that the Asia Bibi case is directly linked to the outcome of negotiations and renewal of an EU-Pakistan preferential tariffs agreement GSP+ raised controversy, as it was later demonstrated as a false claim. On 11 April, Chairman of the British Pakistani Christian Association (BPCA) Wilson Chowdhry said during a seminar in the European Parliament that "[the BPCA] is embarrassed that it ever believed Jan Figel, special envoy for the promotion of freedom of religion or belief outside the EU, who told the Pakistani government that the outcome of Bibi's case is going to be directly linked to trade favors the EU bestows upon Pakistan." Furthermore, Figeľs final report on his activities contained several inaccuracies and diplomatic mistakes. During his visit to "Macedonia" during his visit in the country in November 2018, he omitted to use the correct name of the North Macedonia despite the fact that Prespa Agreement having solved the name issue earlier that June.

== Controversies ==
In a 2021 report by the European Parliament Forum (EPF), Figeľ was identified as a key figure of Agenda Europe. Agenda Europe is a pan-European network of conservative organizations founded in 2013 that seeks to promote extremist conservative positions. According to this EPF report, as well as other sources, figures active in the movement included, for example, Alexey Komov, a representative of the Russian Orthodox Church, who was financed by the sanctioned Russian oligarch Konstantin Malofeev and acted as the person responsible for the foundation’s international projects.

Around 2022, Figeľ became involved with the Clementy Schuman Legacy Foundation, led by Pierre Louvrier, who has been linked to the Russian oligarch Konstantin Malofeev. The foundation also involves Henri Malosse, whom a T-Online investigation connected to the European influence network of oligarch Viktor Medvedchuk, who is linked to Vladimir Putin. In 2024, the Clementy Foundation organized secret, informal meetings with representatives of the Russian Federation at the Vatican.

Figeľ has also participated in activities associated with the international influence apparatus of the Hungarian government under Viktor Orbán. In 2024, he spoke at the MCC Feszt event, and in 2025 he became a visiting fellow at the Mathias Corvinus Collegium (MCC).

Figeľ has long maintained close cooperation with the Unification Church, participates in its events, and has been listed among the movement’s VIP politicians. Unification Church is a new religious movement that many experts describe as a cult and has been associated with cases of political corruption in South Korea. In 2023, Figeľ was awarded the title of doctor honoris causa by the HJ International Graduate School for Peace and Public Leadership in New York, which is associated with the Unification Church. In 2025, Figeľ became chairman of the organization FOREF Europe, which is also closely linked to the Unification Church.

Political offices
New office	Slovak European Commissioner; 2004–2009	Succeeded by Maroš Šefčovič
Preceded by Erkki Liikanen	European Commissioner for Enterprise and Information Society; 2004; Served alongside: Erkki Liikanen, Olli Rehn	Succeeded by Günter Verheugen as European Commissioner for Enterprise and Industry
Preceded by Erkki Liikanen	European Commissioner for Enterprise and Information Society; 2004; Served alongside: Erkki Liikanen, Olli Rehn	Succeeded by Viviane Reding as European Commissioner for Information Society and Media
Preceded by Viviane Reding; Dalia Grybauskaitė as European Commissioner for Education and Culture	European Commissioner for Education, Training, Culture and Multilingualism; 2004–2007	Succeeded by Himself as European Commissioner for Education, Training, Culture and Youth
Preceded by Viviane Reding; Dalia Grybauskaitė as European Commissioner for Education and Culture	European Commissioner for Education, Training, Culture and Multilingualism; 2004–2007	Succeeded by Leonard Orban as European Commissioner for Multilingualism
Preceded by Himself as European Commissioner for Education, Training, Culture and Multilingualism	European Commissioner for Education, Training, Culture and Youth; 2007–2009	Succeeded by Maroš Šefčovič
