= Mírov =

- Municipality
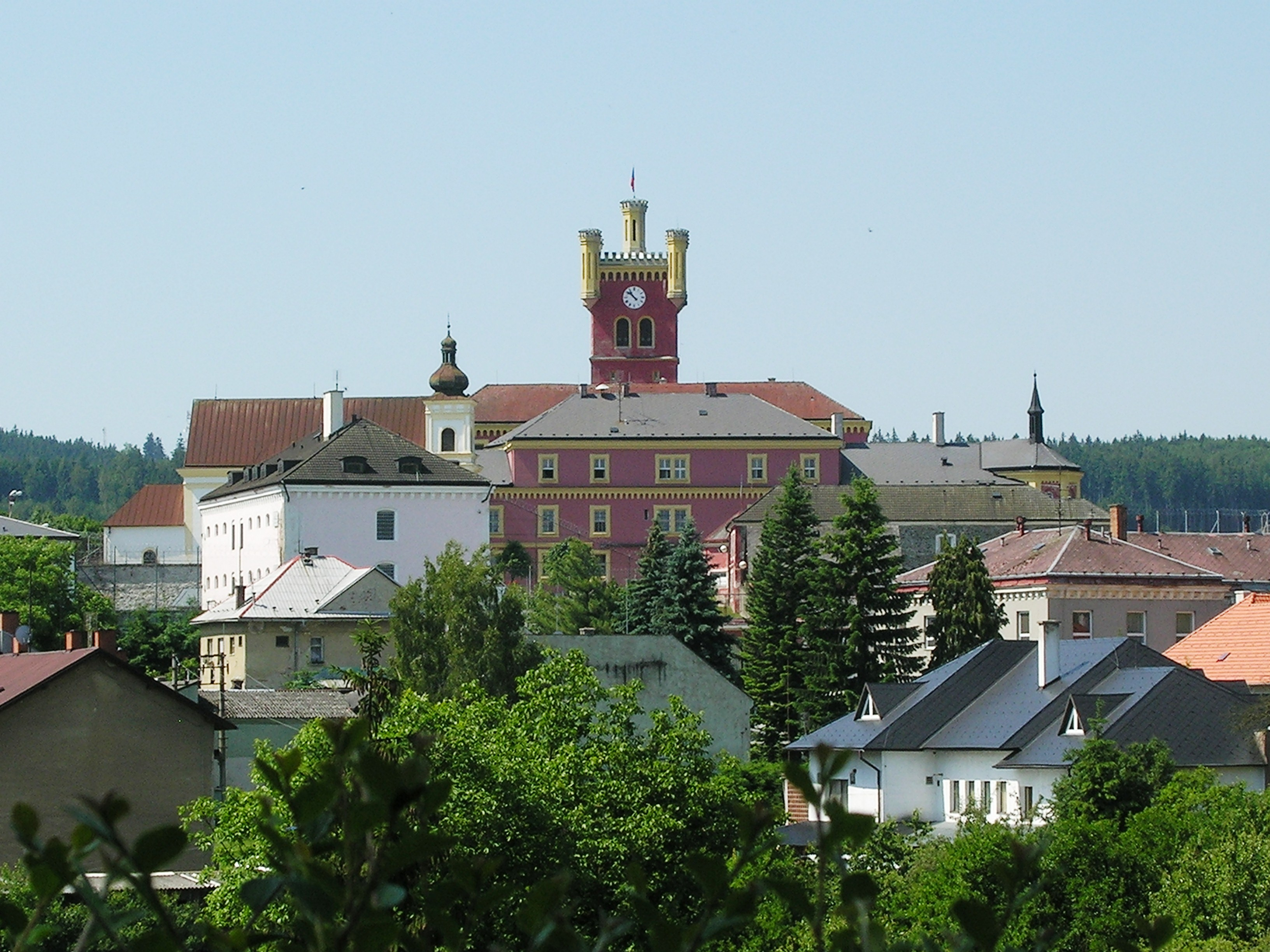
- Mírov Prison

- Flag Coat of arms

- Location in the Czech Republic
- Coordinates: 49°47′53″N 16°50′51″E
- Country: Czech Republic
- Region: Olomouc
- District: Šumperk
- First mentioned: 1266

Area
  - Total: 13.57 km^{2} (5.24 sq mi)
- Elevation: 395 m (1,296 ft)

Population (2026-01-01)
  - Total: 360
  - Density: 27/km^{2} (69/sq mi)
- Time zone: UTC+1 (CET)
  - Summer (DST): UTC+2 (CEST)
- Postal codes: 789 01
- Website: www.obecmirov.cz

Mírov (German: Mürau) is a municipality and village in Šumperk District in the Olomouc Region of the Czech Republic. It has about 400 inhabitants. It is known for its high-security and maximum security prison.

== Geography ==
Mírov is located about 20 kilometres (12 mi) southwest of Šumperk and 36 km (22 mi) northwest of Olomouc. It lies in the Zábřeh Highlands. The highest point is a hill at 559 m (1,834 ft) above sea level. The Mírovka Stream flows through the municipality.

== History ==
The first written mention of Mírov is from 1266. A medieval castle from the mid-12th century in Mírov was rebuilt into a Baroque fortress in 1684. It served as the occasional seat of the Olomouc archbishop until 1741, when it was looted by Prussian army. In 1750, the fortress was rebuilt into a prison. In 1850, the prison was bought by the state, a neo-Gothic reconstruction was carried out and a state prison was set up there.

From 1980 to 1990, Mírov was a municipal part of Mohelnice.

== Demographics ==
Historical population

| Year | Pop. | ±% |
|---|---|---|
| 1869 | 2,162 | — |
| 1880 | 2,107 | −2.5% |
| 1890 | 1,982 | −5.9% |
| 1900 | 1,740 | −12.2% |
| 1910 | 1,550 | −10.9% |

| Year | Pop. | ±% |
|---|---|---|
| 1921 | 1,607 | +3.7% |
| 1930 | 1,016 | −36.8% |
| 1950 | 676 | −33.5% |
| 1961 | 643 | −4.9% |
| 1970 | 546 | −15.1% |

| Year | Pop. | ±% |
|---|---|---|
| 1980 | 494 | −9.5% |
| 1991 | 409 | −17.2% |
| 2001 | 436 | +6.6% |
| 2011 | 748 | +71.6% |
| 2021 | 760 | +1.6% |

Source: Censuses

== Economy ==
Today, the castle serves as a high-security and maximum security prison. It has a capacity of 381 prisoners. With about 250 employees, it is the main employer in Mírov.

== Transport ==
The I/35 road (part of the European route E442) runs through the municipality. It replaces the unfinished section of the D35 motorway from Olomouc to the Hradec Králové Region.

== Sights ==
The main landmark and the most important historic monument is the neo-Gothic castle with the Church of Saint Mary Magdalene. This Baroque church was built in 1664–1687.

== Notable people ==
- Karl Michael von Levetzow (1871–1945), German poet and librettist; died here
- Hugo Sonnenschein (1889–1953), Austrian writer; died here
- Štefan Tiso (1897–1959), Slovak politician and lawyer; died here
- János Esterházy (1901–1957), Hungarian politician; died here
