= Ministry of Education (Slovakia) =

Government ministry of Slovakia

Ministry of Education, Research, Development and Youth of the Slovak Republic
- Ministerstvo školstva, výskumu, vývoja a mládeže Slovenskej republiky
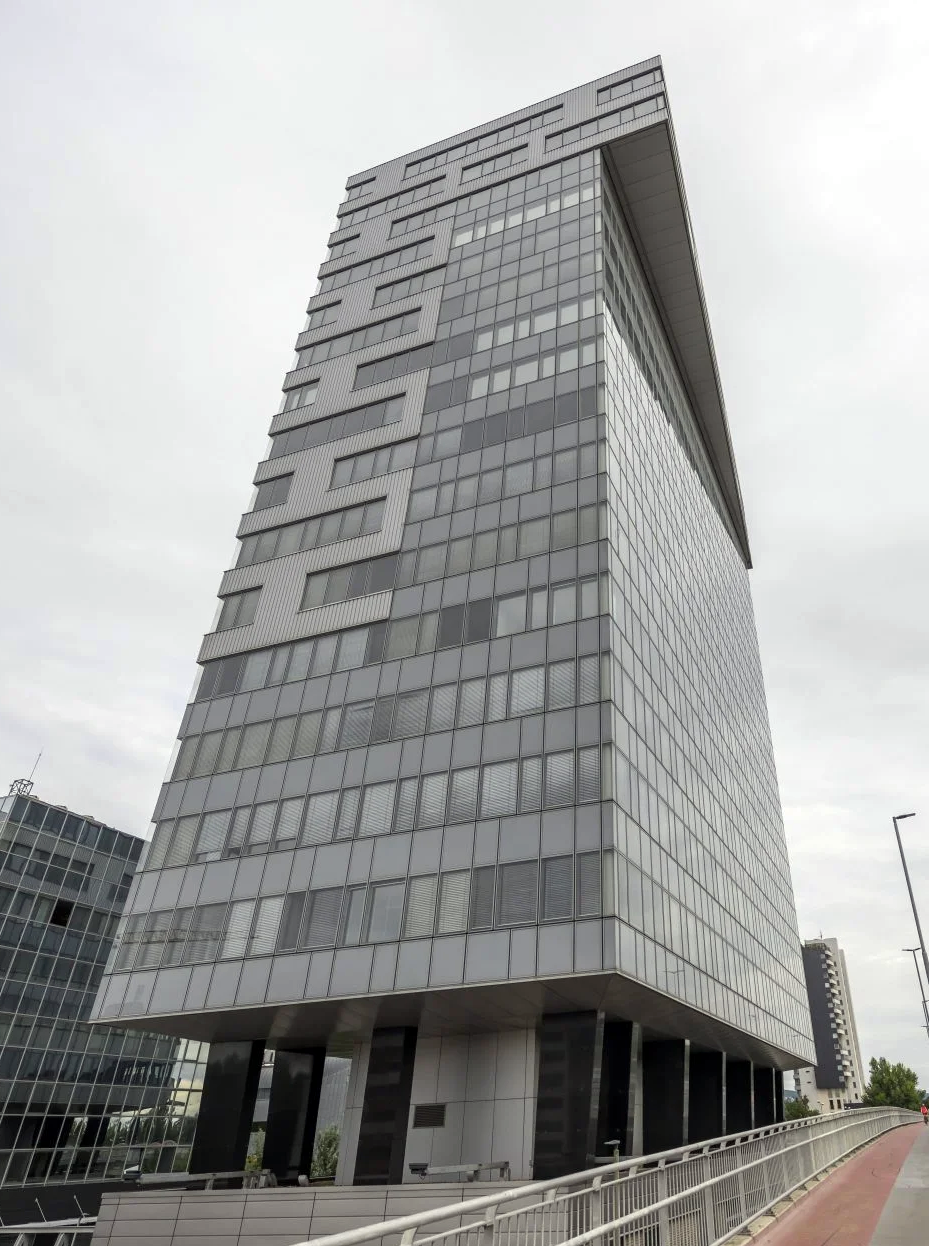

Agency overview
- Formed: 1992
- Jurisdiction: Slovakia
- Headquarters: Černyševského 50, Bratislava
- Agency executive: Tomáš Drucker
- Website: https://www.minedu.sk/

Ministry of Education, Research, Development and Youth is a government ministry of Slovakia. Since 25 October 2023, the Minister of the Education has been Tomáš Drucker.

== History ==
The ministry was founded as the Ministry of Education. From March to December 1994 its name was changed to Ministry of Education and Science. On 1 July 2010 it became known under its current name.
