= Hugo Sonnenschein (writer) =

Austrian writer (1889–1953)

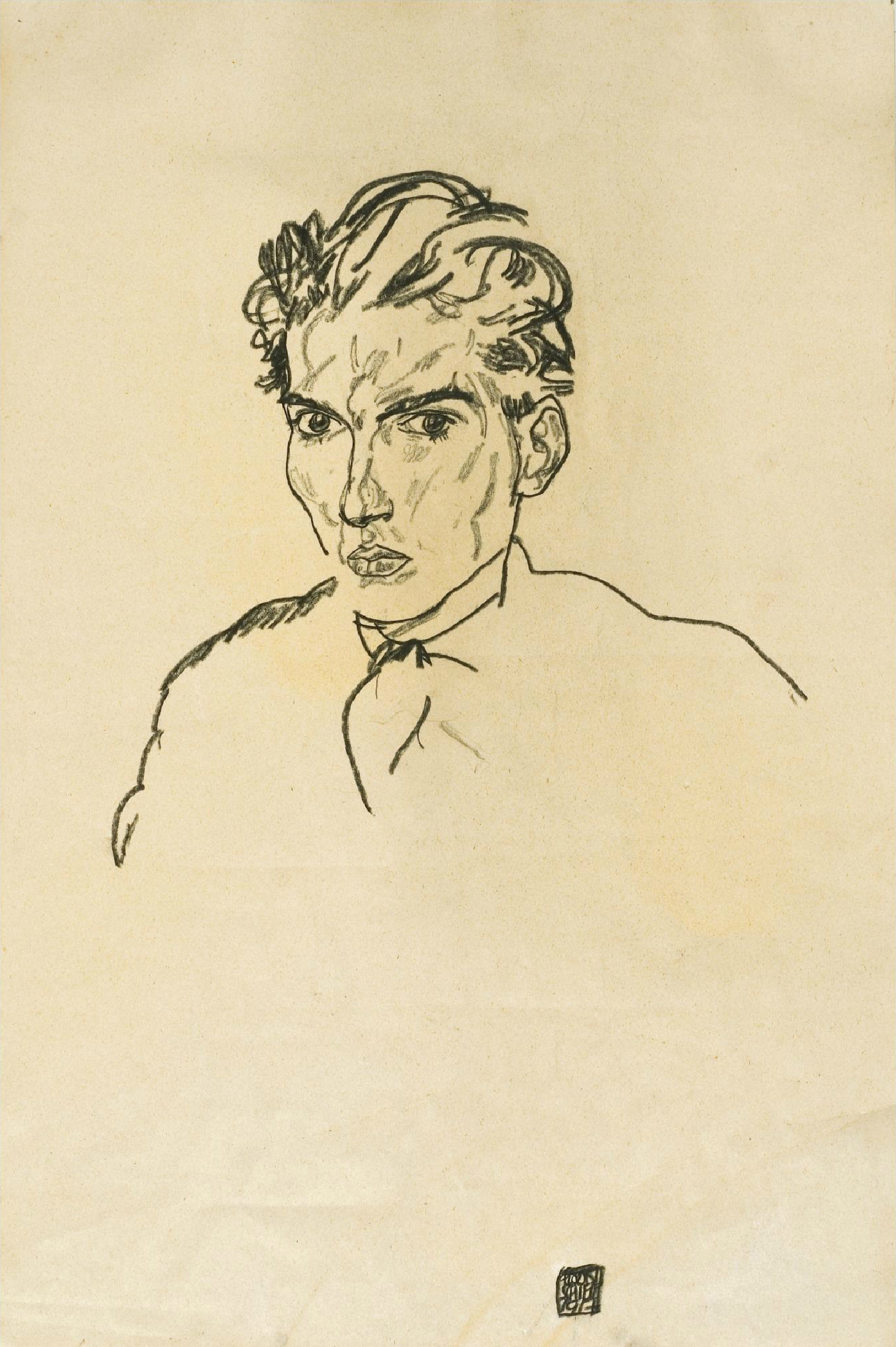
Hugo Sonnenschein (Egon Schiele, 1917

Hugo Sonnenschein (pseudonym: Sonka, Hugo Sonka; 25 May 1889, Kyjov – 20 July 1953, Mírov) was an Austrian writer from Bohemia. He contributed to the Czech-language Communist newspaper Průkopník svobody.

== Literary works ==
- Die Legende vom weltverkommenen Sonka, 1920
