= Slovak Medical University =

University in Bratislava

Coordinates: 48.1685°N 17.0884°E

Slovak Medical University in Bratislava
- Slovenská zdravotnícka univerzita v Bratislave
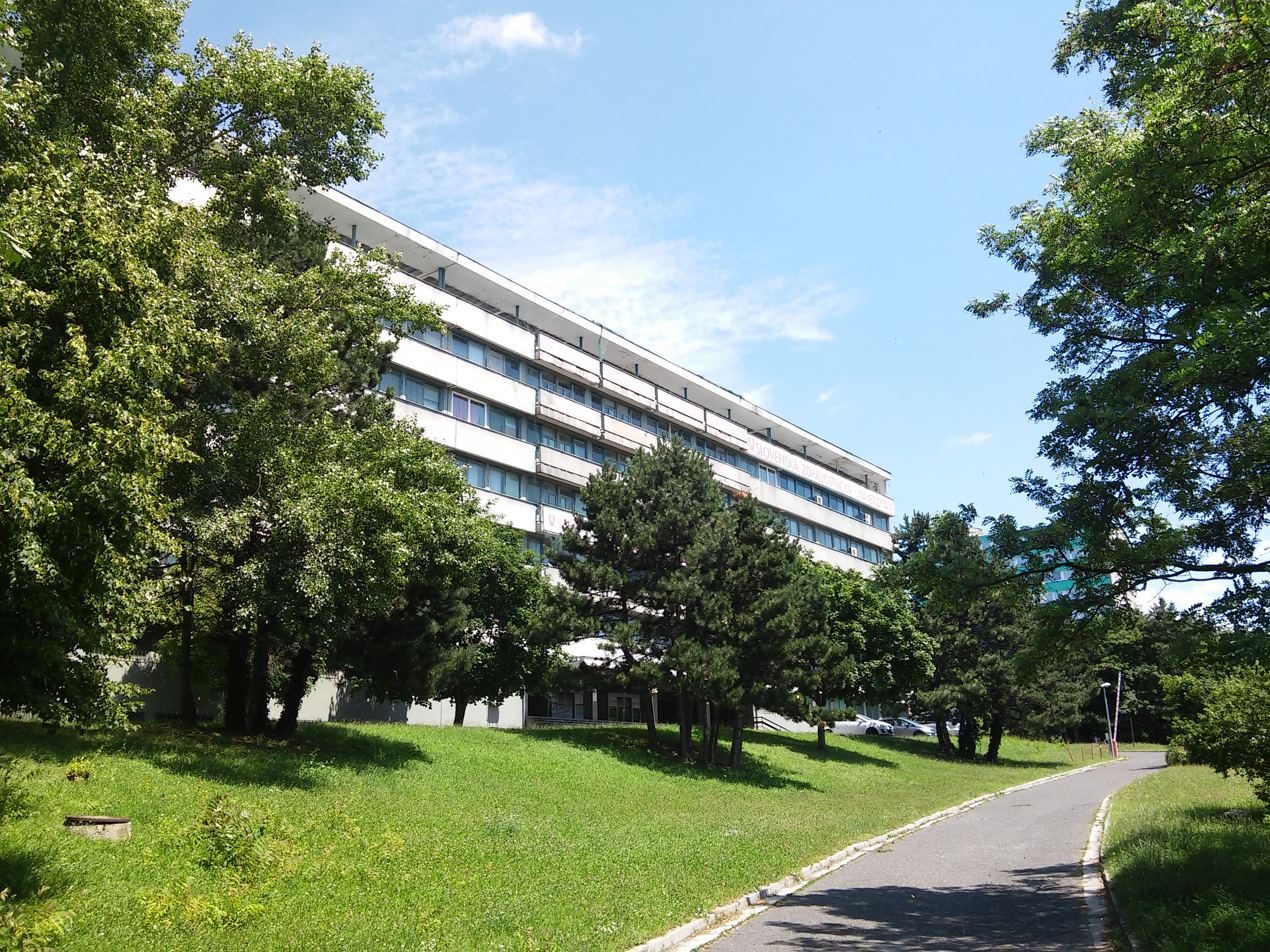
- Type: State
- Established: 1 September 2002
- Rector: Peter Šimko
- Location: Limbová 12, 833 03 Bratislava 1, Bratislava, Slovakia
- Website: eszu.sk

The Slovak Medical University in Bratislava (SMU; Slovak: Slovenská zdravotnícka univerzita v Bratislave) is a state "college of university type" seated in Bratislava, Slovakia. It was created by a law of 25 June 2002 with effect from 1 September 2002 and replaced the Slovak Postgraduate Academy of Medicine (Slovenská postgraduálna akadémia medicíny). The university continues the tradition of specialized and lifelong education of healthcare workers in Slovakia.

The Slovak Institute for Postgraduate Education of Physicians, established on May 1, 1953, in Trenčín, laid the foundations of education of healthcare professionals in Slovakia. From July 7, 1966, the Institute moved into new premises in Bratislava, under a new name – The Institute of Further Education of Physicians and Pharmacists, which remained until 1991. On July 1, 1991, the name was changed to the Institute for Further Education of Professionals in Healthcare, and later, resulting from requirements in practice, the last change on November 1, 1998, transformed it into the Slovak Postgraduate Academy of Medicine in Bratislava.

On September 1, 2002, the Slovak Medical University was founded in Bratislava by Act No. 401/2002 Coll. of the National Council of the Slovak Republic on the establishment of the Slovak Medical University, as a state university of higher education.

The Slovak Medical University in Bratislava is the only university in Slovakia that provides monothematic education for healthcare professions in all three degrees of higher education, and at the same time, the only institution that has guaranteed complex education of healthcare workers in Slovakia under various names since 1953.

== International medical faculty ==
SMU has an English programme along with a Slovak language programme. It was opened in the academic year of 2012–2013, it is fully accredited and listed in the World Directory of Medical Schools.

== Faculties ==
The university has four faculties:

- Faculty of Medicine
- Faculty of Public Health Studies
- Faculty of Nursing and Professional Health Studies
- Faculty of Health (est. 2005 in Banská Bystrica)
