= Darina Gabániová =

Slovak politician

Member of the National Council
- In office 15 October 2002 – 20 March 2020

Personal details
- Born: 20 August 1955 (age 71)
- Party: Direction – Slovak Social Democracy
- Education: Comenius University

Darina Gabániová (born 20 August 1955) is a Slovak dentist and politician. She served as a member of the National Council in 2002–2020 in the caucus of the Direction – Slovak Social Democracy party.

Gabániová graduated in dentistry from Comenius University in 1978 and later practiced in Košice. Since 1990, she has been teaching dentistry at the Comenius University.

Despite being a long-term member of parliament, Gabániová kept a low profile. In 2015, she was accused by opposition leaders Miroslav Beblavý and Igor Matovič of ties to the oligarch Juraj Široký. She defended the connection by claiming the businessman's family has standard European values.
