= Dušan Bublavý =

Slovak politician (born 1964)

Member of the National Council
- In office 8 July 2010 – 20 March 2020

Personal details
- Born: 4 April 1964 (age 62) Častkovce, Czechoslovakia (now Slovakia)
- Party: Direction – Slovak Social Democracy

Dušan Bublavý (born 4 April 1964 in Častkovce) is a Slovak politician, who served as a member of the National Council in 2010-2020. Since 2006, he has been the mayor of his home village of Častkovce. He is a member of Direction – Slovak Social Democracy party.
