= Štefan Tiso =

Slovak politician and lawyer (1897–1959)

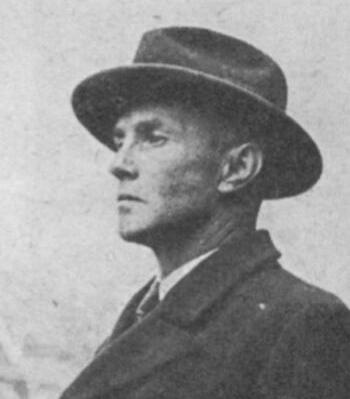
- Štefan Tiso in 1944.

Prime Minister of the First Slovak Republic
- In office September 5, 1944 – April 4, 1945
- President: Jozef Tiso
- Preceded by: Vojtech Tuka
- Succeeded by: Office abolished

Foreign Minister of the First Slovak Republic
- In office September 5, 1944 – April 4, 1945
- Preceded by: Vojtech Tuka
- Succeeded by: Office abolished

Minister of Justice of the First Slovak Republic
- In office September 5, 1944 – April 4, 1945
- Preceded by: Gejza Fritz
- Succeeded by: Office abolished

Personal details
- Born: October 18, 1897 Nagybiccse, Trencsén County, Kingdom of Hungary (now Bytča, Slovakia)
- Died: March 28, 1959 (aged 61) Mírov, Czechoslovakia (now Czech Republic)
- Party: Slovak People's Party
- Occupation: Politician, lawyer

Štefan Tiso (October 18, 1897 – March 28, 1959) was a lawyer and president of the Supreme Court of the 1939–1945 Slovak Republic which was a puppet state of Nazi Germany. He was a cousin of Jozef Tiso, the president of the Republic.

Tiso was born in Nagybiccse, Kingdom of Hungary.

He became prime minister (replacing Vojtech Tuka), Foreign Minister (replacing also Vojtech Tuka) and minister of Justice (replacing Gejza Fritz) of the Slovak Republic. In the latter position in 1944 he pressed for death sentences against leaders of the pro-allied Slovak National Council. Tiso also emphasized his desire to see a Final Solution to the Jewish Question in Slovakia, in discussions with Josef Witiska, the commander of Einsatzgruppe H. He believed that the uprising was the work of Judeo-Bolshevik plotters and considered Jews "enemies of the state".

In a postwar trial, Štefan Tiso was given a life sentence. He died in prison in Mírov, Czechoslovakia.
