= Vladimír Faič =

Slovak politician

Member of the National Council
- Incumbent
- Assumed office 7 Feb 2006

Member of the National Council
- In office 30 October 1998 – 15 October 2002

Personal details
- Born: 15 June 1948 (age 78) Tekovské Lužany, Czechoslovakia (now Slovakia)
- Party: Communist Party of Czechoslovakia; Party of the Democratic Left; Direction – Slovak Social Democracy
- Education: Comenius University

Vladimír Faič (born 15 July 1948 in Tekovské Lužany) is a Slovak politician, long-term member of the National Council.

Vladimír Faič is originally a forester by profession. After graduation from the Higher School of Politics, a communist regime educational institute for cadres of working class background, he became a political functionary on the local level and graduated in Law from the Comenius University. After the Velvet Revolution, he became one of the co-founders of the Party of the Democratic Left. Between 1998 and 2002 he represented this party in the National Council.

After the end of his parliamentary mandate, Faič became active in the Direction – Slovak Social Democracy. He founded the Analysis-Strategy-Alternatives (ASA) party think tank. Since 2012, Faič has been a member of the National Council for Direction – Slovak Social Democracy. In addition to being an MP, he served as the Chairman of the Council of advisors for all governments of Robert Fico and Peter Pellegrini.
