= Monika Gibalová =

Slovak politician

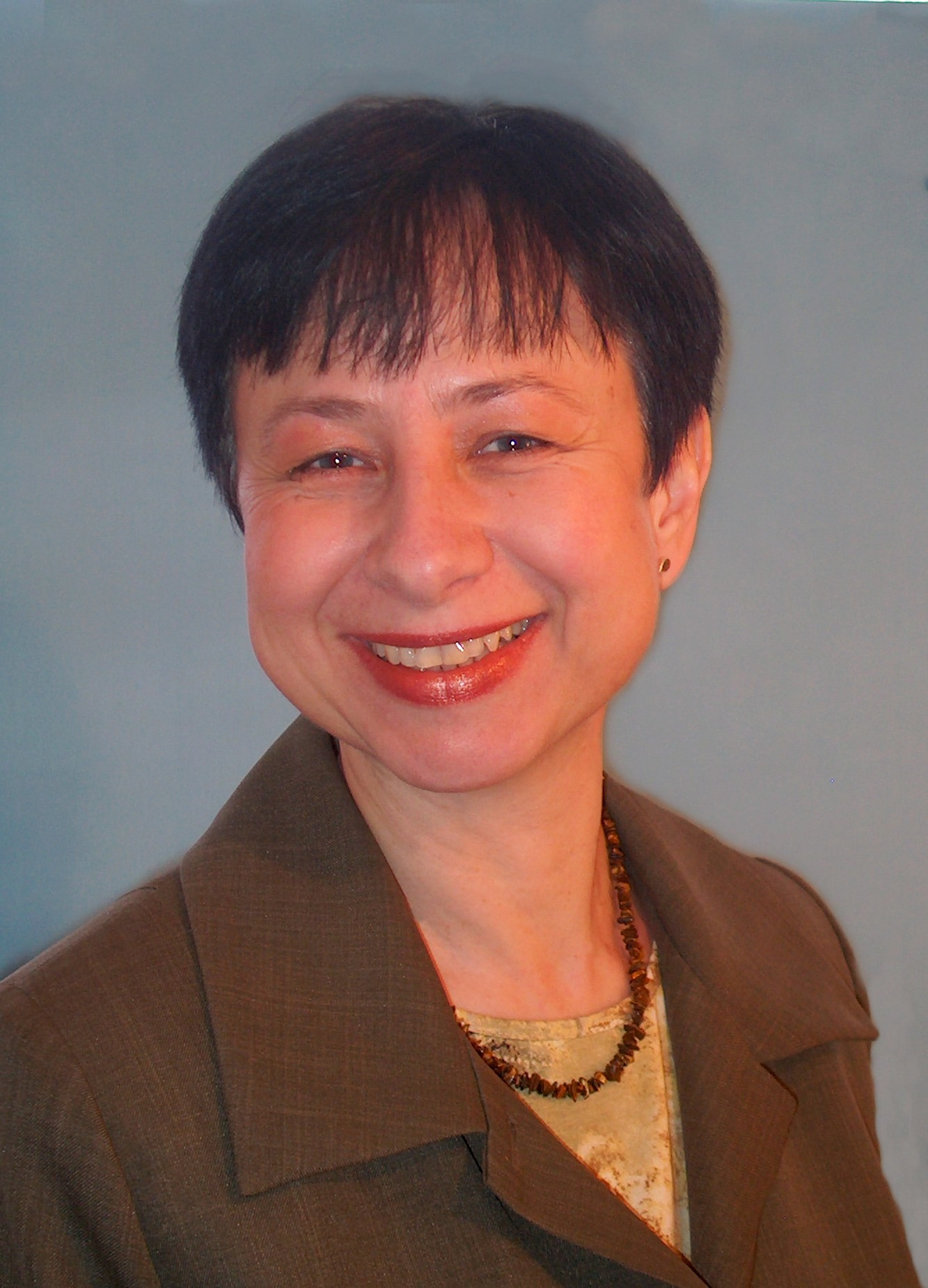

Member of the National Council
- In office 7 February 2006 – 23 March 2016

Personal details
- Born: 1 May 1960 (age 65) Spišská Sobota, Czechoslovakia (now Slovakia)
- Party: Christian Democratic Movement
- Education: Comenius University; University of Trnava

Monika Gibalová (born 1 May 1960 in Spišská Sobota) is a former Slovak politician. She served as a Member of the National Council in the caucus of the Christian Democratic Movement for three terms from 2006 to 2016.

Before entering politics, Gibalová worked as a nurse. In 1997 she finished her studies of Catholic Theology at the Comenius University. In 2000 she received her PhD in Social Work from the University of Trnava.
