= Magda Košútová =

Slovak politician

Member of the National Council
- In office 4 July 2006 – 23 March 2016

Personal details
- Born: 6 August 1955 (age 70)
- Party: Direction – Slovak Social Democracy
- Education: Slovak University of Agriculture

Magda Košútová (born 6 August 1955) is a former Slovak politician, who served as a Member of the National Council in the caucus of Direction – Slovak Social Democracy from 2006 to 2016.

In 2010 she announced her bid to run for the Governor of the Trenčín Region, but eventually supported Pavol Sedláček.

She graduated from the Slovak University of Agriculture.
