= Čaklov =

Village in Slovakia

- Municipality
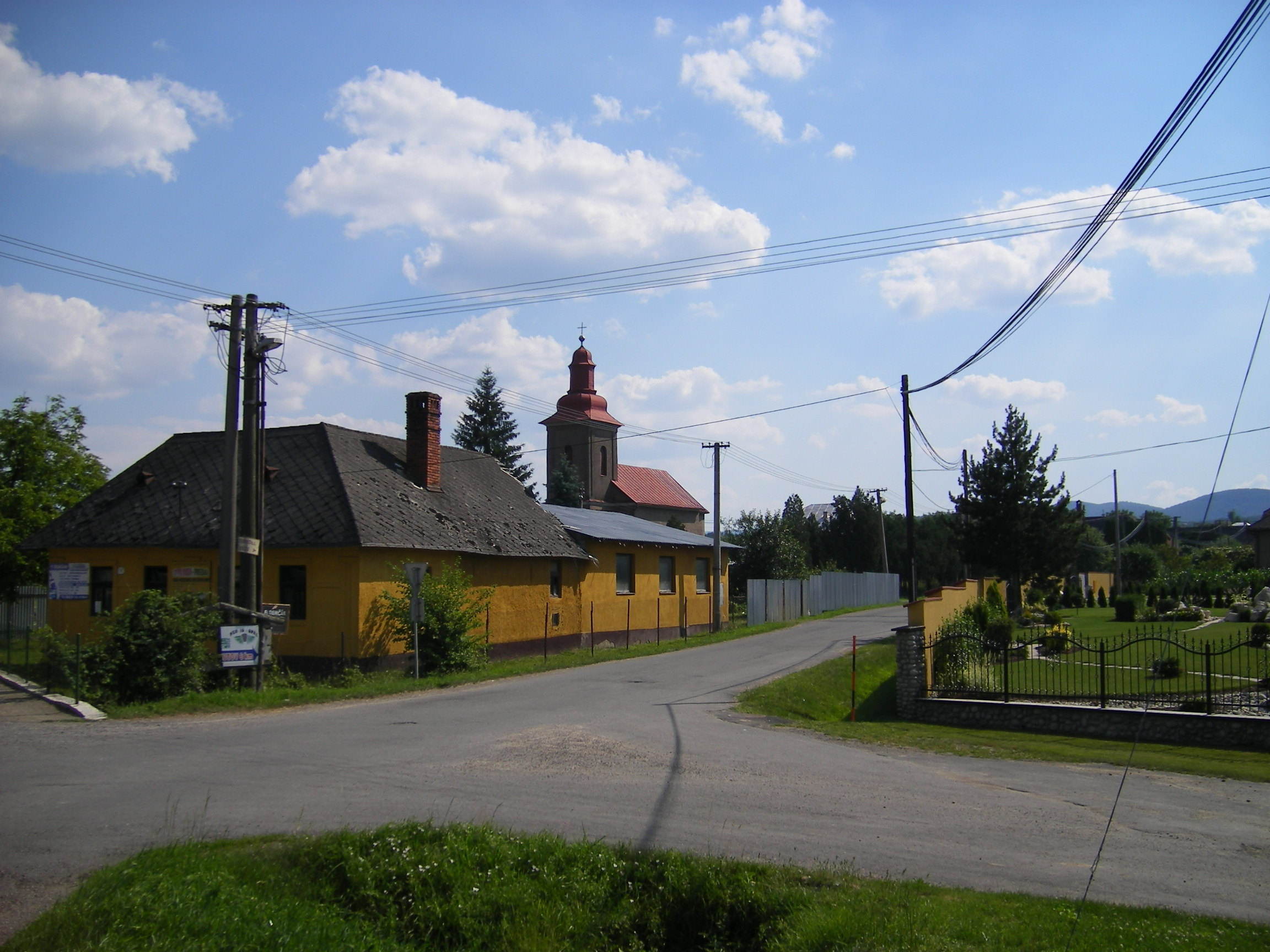

- Flag

- Location of Čaklov in the Prešov Region Location of Čaklov in Slovakia
- Coordinates: 48.90°N 21.63°E
- Country: Slovakia
- Region: Prešov Region
- District: Vranov nad Topľou District
- First mentioned: 1282

Area
  - Total: 12.75 km^{2} (4.92 sq mi)
- Elevation: 134 m (440 ft)

Population (2025)
  - Total: 2,790
- Time zone: UTC+1 (CET)
  - Summer (DST): UTC+2 (CEST)
- Postal code: 943 5
- Area code: +421 57
- Vehicle registration plate (until 2022): VT
- Website: www.obeccaklov.sk

Čaklov is a village and municipality in Vranov nad Topľou District in the Prešov Region of eastern Slovakia.

== History ==
In historical records the village was first mentioned in 1282.

== Geography ==
The municipality lies at an altitude of 134 metres (440 ft) and covers an area of 12.75 km^{2} (4.92 sq mi) (2025).

== Population ==
Population statistic (10 years)
Year	1995	2005	2015	2025
Count	2079	2261	2561	2790
Difference		+8.75%	+13.26%	+8.94%

Population statistic
Year	2024	2025
Count	2774	2790
Difference		+0.57%

It has a population of 2790 people (31 December 2025).

=== Ethnicity ===
Census 2021 (1+%)
Ethnicity	Number	Fraction
Slovak	2407	89.57%
Romani	652	24.26%
Not found out	92	3.42%
Total	2687	

In year 2021 was 2687 people by ethnicity 2407 as Slovak, 652 as Romani, 92 as Not found out, 18 as Czech, 15 as Rusyn, 4 as Other, 2 as German, 1 as Ukrainian, 1 as Russian, 1 as Polish, 1 as Hungarian and 1 as Albanian.

Note on population: The difference values of population numbers in the table "Population statistic" and in the sections "Ethnicity" & "Religion" is caused by the use of various statistical methods.

=== Religion ===
Census 2021 (1+%)
Religion	Number	Fraction
Roman Catholic Church	1629	60.63%
Evangelical Church	368	13.7%
None	367	13.66%
Greek Catholic Church	247	9.19%
Not found out	41	1.53%
Total	2687	

In year 2021 was 2687 people by religion 1629 from Roman Catholic Church, 368 from Evangelical Church, 367 from None, 247 from Greek Catholic Church, 41 from Not found out, 17 from Jehovah's Witnesses, 6 from Ad hoc movements, 4 from Eastern Orthodox Church, 4 from Christian Congregations in Slovakia, 2 from Other, 1 from Islam and 1 from Apostolic Church.

== See also ==
- List of municipalities and towns in Slovakia

== Genealogical resources ==
The records for genealogical research are available at the state archive "Statny Archiv in Presov, Slovakia"

- Roman Catholic church records (births/marriages/deaths): 1769-1910 (parish B)
- Greek Catholic church records (births/marriages/deaths): 1796-1951 (parish B)
