= Ľubomír Vážny =

Slovak politician (born 1957)

Member of the National Council
- Incumbent
- Assumed office 23 March 2016

Director General of the Social Insurance Institution
- In office 24 July 2017 – 9 September 2020
- Preceded by: Dušan Muňko
- Succeeded by: Juraj Káčer

Deputy Prime Minister for Investment
- In office 26 November 2012 – 2016

Minister of Transport, Posts and Telecommunications of the Slovak Republic
- In office 4 July 2006 – 8 July 2010
- Preceded by: Pavol Prokopovič
- Succeeded by: Ján Figeľ

Personal details
- Born: 15 July 1957 (age 68) Žilina, Czechoslovakia
- Party: Direction – Social Democracy
- Children: 2
- Education: Slovak University of Technology in Bratislava

Ľubomír Vážny (born 15 July 1957) is a Slovak politician. He is a former Minister of Transport, Posts and Telecommunications of the Slovak Republic. He served from 4 July 2006 to 8 July 2010. From 2012 to 2016, he was Deputy Prime Minister of the Slovak Republic for Investments. From 24 July 2017 to 9 September 2020, he was the Director General of the Social Insurance Institution.

== Biography ==
Ľubomír Vážny graduated in 1981 from the Slovak Technical University in Bratislava (Faculty of Civil Engineering, Department of Civil Engineering). In 1981-1985 he worked as a site foreman, construction supervisor, independent development worker at Pozemné stavby, š.p. Trnava, 1981-1994 head of the pricing and typing department, head of the TÚ department, technical deputy, director at Stavoinvest HO Banská Bystrica. Since 1994 he was director and managing director of Stavoinvesta s.r.o. Banská Bystrica.

Ľubomír Vážny is a member of the presidium of the Direction - Social Democracy party (SMER) and the shadow minister of transport and construction of this party. He was elected as a Member of the Slovak Parliament in the 2002-2006 election period for SMER, which has been operating under the name SMER - Social Democracy since 1 January 2005. He was vice-chairman of the Committee on the Economy, Privatisation and Entrepreneurship of the National Assembly and a member of the Mandate and Immunity Committee of the National Assembly of the Slovak Republic.

In 2006 he was re-elected as a member of the National Council of the Slovak Republic for the SMER-SD party, from 4 July 2006 to 2010 he was Minister of Transport, Posts and Telecommunications.

In the municipal elections in 2010, he ran for mayor of Banská Bystrica in the electoral coalition of SMER, SNS, ĽS-HZDS. With 10,443 votes he came second, Peter Gogola became mayor with 13,842 votes.
