= MCC Feszt =

Annual event in Hungary

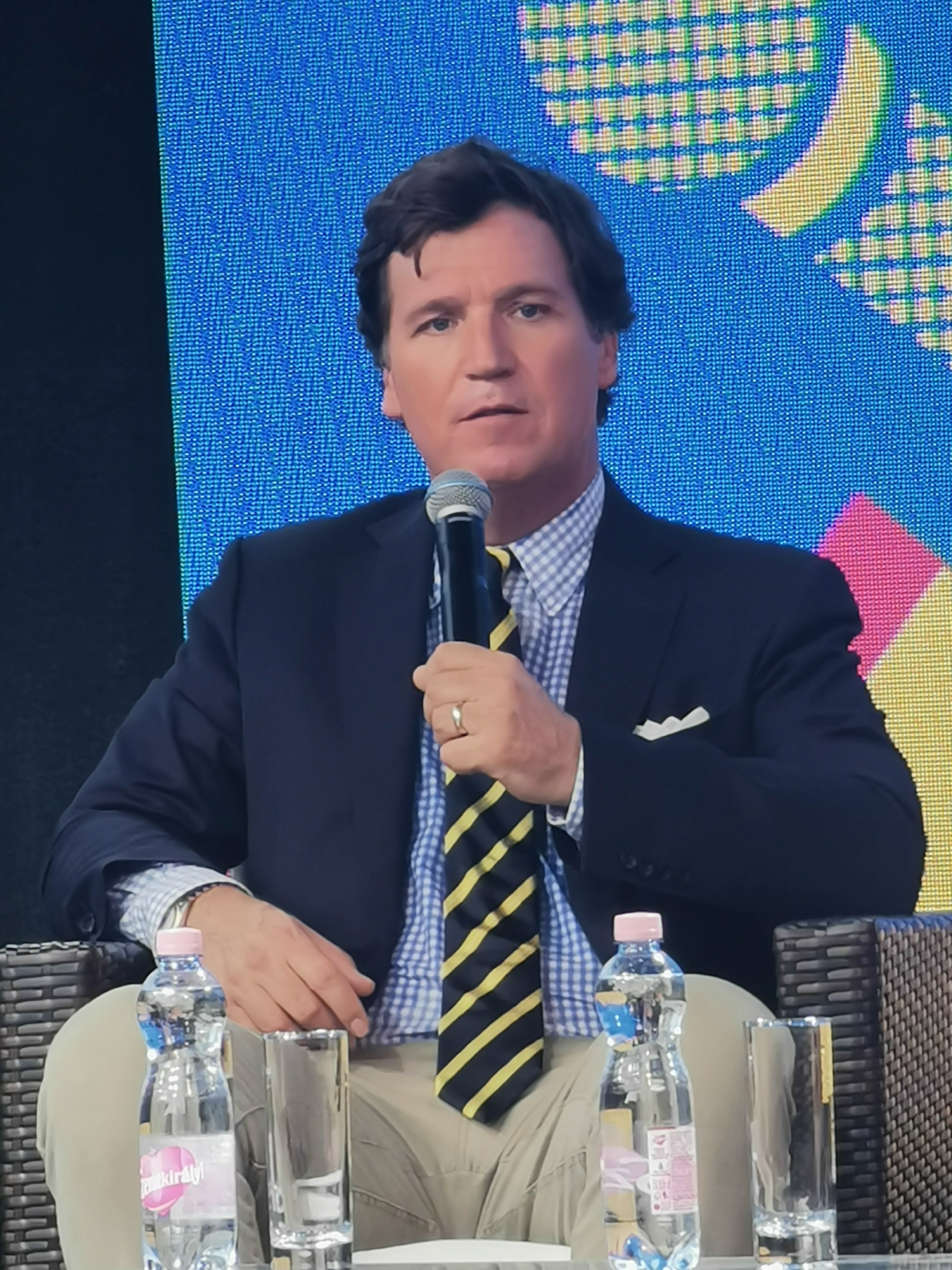
- Tucker Carlson on stage in Esztergom, 2021
- Genre: Cultural, educational, political
- Locations: Esztergom, Hungary
- Years active: 2021–present
- Website: mccfeszt.hu

MCC Feszt is an annual multidisciplinary festival held in Esztergom, Hungary, organized by the Mathias Corvinus Collegium (MCC). Launched in 2021, the event combines intellectual discourse, cultural programs, and musical performances, with the aim of fostering talent development and public engagement.

== History ==
The inaugural MCC Feszt took place in August 2021 and attracted over 12,000 visitors. The event featured professional panels, public lectures, and live music. Notable speakers included American commentator Tucker Carlson, conservative author Dennis Prager, and geopolitical analyst Abishur Prakash.

Since then, the festival has been held annually in Esztergom. By 2024, MCC Feszt included over 300 speakers, 100 professional programs, and more than 40 music performances, with total attendance reaching nearly 49,000 people.

Over time, MCC Feszt has become a notable gathering for Hungarian and international conservatives. Some critics have questioned the ideological neutrality of the event, noting that while Hungarian-language panels include left-wing and liberal participants, English-language panels tend to feature primarily conservative voices.

In 2023, a special edition titled "MCC Feszt After" featured a program called The World According to Tucker Carlson, where the conservative commentator defended the Orbán government and criticized the Biden administration's then-hostile stance towards Hungary.

== Format ==
MCC Feszt takes place over three days and is divided into daytime and nighttime programming. Daytime events include public issue panels and interactive activities, while nighttime programs feature Hungarian music by popular artists such as Majka, Irie Maffia, and Tankcsapda.

== Programming ==
The festival aims to bridge public education and entertainment. Panels cover topics such as geopolitics, education, migration, and digital innovation.

Past editions have featured speakers including Bjorn Lomborg, David Coulthard, Adrian Vermeule, Jeffrey Sachs, and Niall Ferguson. Concerts by Hungarian musicians are held alongside interactive areas like Edu Sétány, which showcases MCC's educational programs, NGOs, and civil society organizations.

Attendance is free, though optional "MCC Feszt Passes" provide added services such as VIP access, shuttle transport, and discounts.

== 2025 Edition ==
The next MCC Feszt is scheduled to take place from 31 July to 2 August 2025. The speaker lineup includes political strategist Dominic Cummings and author Ayaan Hirsi Ali. Musical performers will include Irie Maffia, BSW, T. Danny, and other Hungarian artists.

== Organizers ==
MCC Feszt is organized by Mathias Corvinus Collegium, Hungary's largest private educational institution, based in Budapest. While MCC claims ideological independence, it embraces values such as patriotism, tradition, and realism.

Critics have questioned the institution's neutrality. In 2020, the Hungarian government endowed MCC with a 10% shareholding in both MOL and Gedeon Richter, along with US$462 million in cash and US$9 million in property. The endowment, valued at approximately US$1.3 billion, has led detractors to describe MCC as a "breeding ground for future Fidesz-friendly elites".
