= Dušan Jarjabek =

Slovak singer and politician

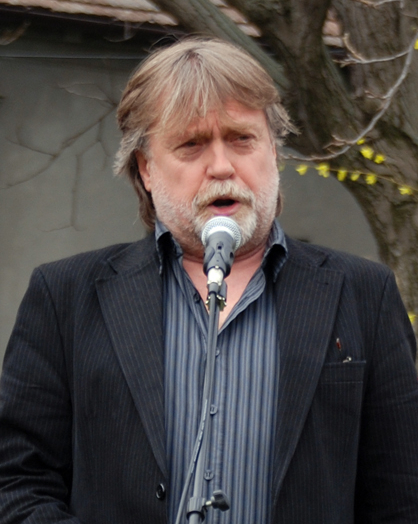

Member of the National Council
- Incumbent
- Assumed office 29 October 1998

Personal details
- Born: 4 March 1953 (age 73) Bratislava, Czechoslovakia (now Slovakia)
- Party: SMER-SD (2005–ongoing); Previously: ĽS-HZDS (199?–2005)
- Education: Academy of Performing Arts in Bratislava

Dušan Jarjabek (born 4 March 1953 in Bratislava) is a baryton singer of opera and operetta as well as pop music, vocal coach and politician. He has served as a member of the National Council since 1998.

== Music and teaching career ==
Jarjabek studied signing at the Academy of Performing Arts in Bratislava, graduating in 1976. Afterward, he spent one year at the Teatro del Parco in Palermo.

In1980–1991 he was a singer at the New Scene theater. In 1996–1998 he was the director of the New Scene. Since 1985 he has been a singer at the Slovak National Theater Opera ensemble.

In addition to performing, Jarjabek has taught singing at the Academy of Performing Arts since 1988.

== Political career ==
Jarjabek was elected an MP of the National Council in 1998 on the Movement for a Democratic Slovakia list, which he joined to express his support for the nationalistic policies of Vladimír Mečiar. In 2005 he left the party and joined the Direction – Slovak Social Democracy over his dissatisfaction with what he perceived as tolerance of the government.
