= Štefan Harabin =

Slovak Minister of Justice, politician and judge

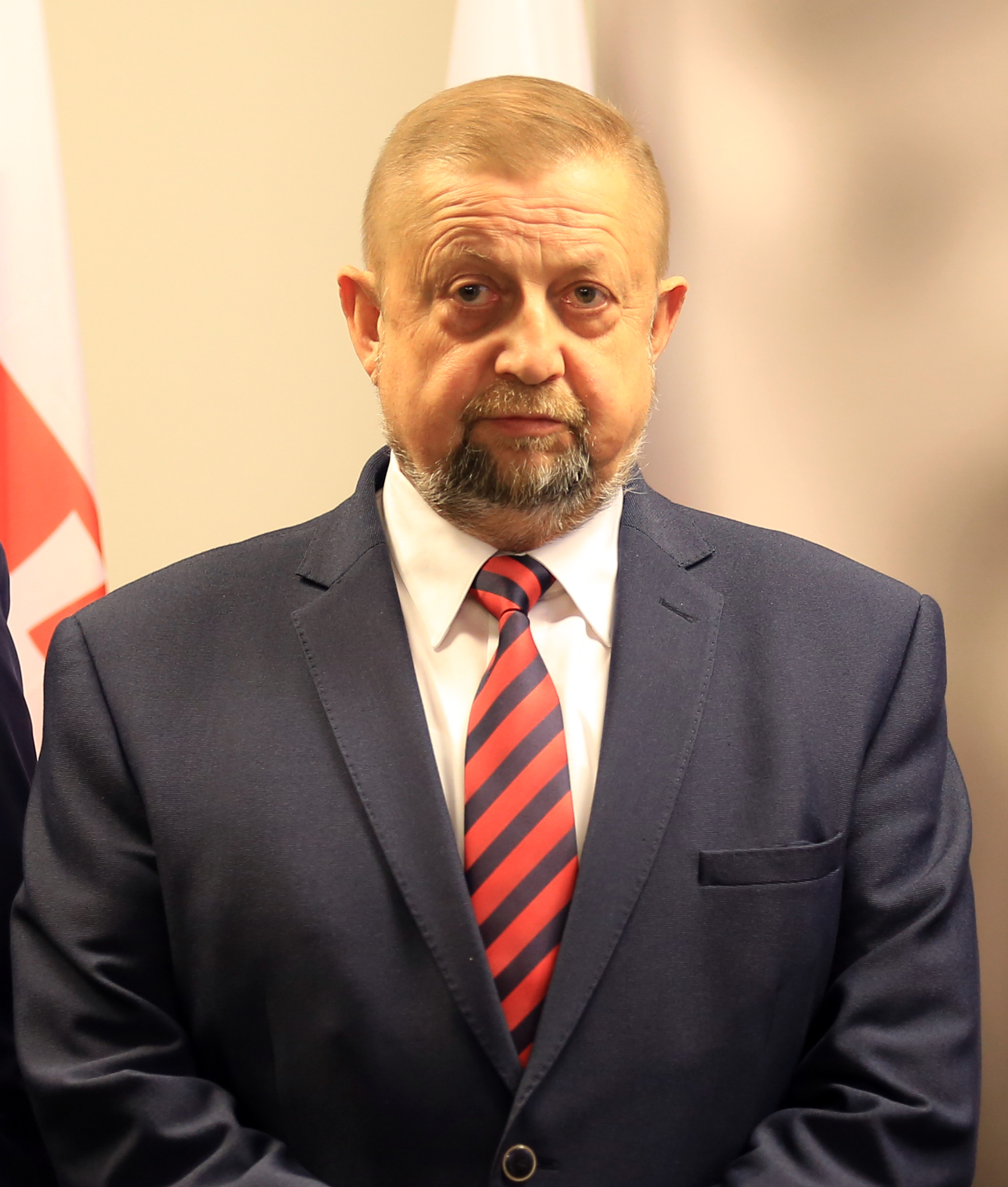

Chief Justice of the Supreme Court of Slovakia
- In office 23 June 2009 – 23 June 2014
- Preceded by: Milan Karabín
- Succeeded by: Daniela Švecová
- In office 11 February 1998 – 11 February 2003
- Preceded by: Milan Karabín
- Succeeded by: Milan Karabín

Minister of Justice of Slovakia
- In office 4 July 2006 – 23 June 2009
- Prime Minister: Robert Fico
- Preceded by: Lucia Žitňanská
- Succeeded by: Viera Petríková

Personal details
- Born: 4 May 1957 (age 69) Ľubica, Czechoslovakia
- Party: KSČ (until 1989); Homeland (2019–2021)
- Other party: ĽS-HZDS (2006–2009; affiliated, but not a formal member)

Štefan Harabin (born 4 May 1957) is a former Slovak judge and politician. He served as chief justice of the Supreme Court of Slovakia for two terms (1998–2003 and 2009–2014) and Minister of Justice from 2006 to 2009. In 2019 and 2024 he ran unsuccessfully for President of Slovakia.

== Judicial and political career ==
Harabin graduated from the Faculty of Law, Pavol Jozef Šafárik University Košice. He started his judicial career as a probationary judge at the Košice regional court in 1980. Three years later, he became a professional judge at the Poprad district court. Harabin was a member of the Communist Party of Czechoslovakia until the Velvet Revolution of 1989. After the revolution, he continued to practice as a judge at the Košice regional court, until he was elected to the Supreme Court of Slovakia in 1991.

From 1998 to 2003, he was the chief justice of the Supreme Court and, in addition, president of the Judicial Council of Slovakia created in 2001. He served as minister of justice and deputy prime minister in Robert Fico's first cabinet from 4 July 2006 to 23 June 2009. He was nominated by the right-wing People's Party – Movement for a Democratic Slovakia (ĽS-HZDS), but was not formally a member of that party. Subsequently, he returned to his post of chief justice, serving until June 2014.

== 2019 Slovak presidential campaign ==
Harabin ran as a non-partisan candidate in the 2019 Slovak presidential election. While nominally independent, he was endorsed by the extraparliamentary Christian Democracy – Life and Prosperity party. He ran on a platform of "traditional Slovak culture based on Christianity and family, formed by a man–father and woman–mother" and rejecting "gender ideology".

During the campaign he accused Muslim migrants of "killing and raping European women in Germany and France" and claimed his opponents wanted to destroy Slovak culture. He also condemned NATO, European Union institutions as well as homosexuals.

Harabin finished third, winning 14.3% of votes.

== 2024 Slovak presidential campaign ==
Harabin ran as a candidate in the 2024 Slovak presidential election.

Harabin stated that if he become the Slovak president, his first international journey would be to Russia, instead of the traditional visit to neighbour the Czech Republic, because of their support for "fascist" Ukraine in the 2022 Russian invasion.

He again finished third, getting 11,7% of votes (turnout: 51.9%).

== Arrest ==
On 16 May 2022, Harabin was arrested by the Slovak police in connection to "approval of Russia's attack on Ukraine".
