= Gábor Gál =

Slovak lawyer and politician

Minister of Justice of Slovakia
- In office 22 March 2018 – 21 March 2020
- Prime Minister: Peter Pellegrini
- Preceded by: Lucia Žitňanská
- Succeeded by: Mária Kolíková

Member of the National Council of the Slovak Republic
- In office 15 October 2002 – 22 March 2018

Personal details
- Born: 22 November 1974 (age 51) Šaľa, Czechoslovakia
- Party: Party of the Hungarian Community; Most–Híd
- Spouse: Zsuzsanna Gálová
- Children: 3
- Education: Comenius University in Bratislava

Gábor Gál (born 22 November 1974 in Šaľa) is an ethnic Hungarian politician in Slovakia. From 2018 to 2020 he served as the Minister of Justice. From 2002 to 2018, he was a member of the National Council.

== Background ==
Gál studied law at the Comenius University in 1998 and then worked as an attorney. In 2006 he represented the hate-crime victim Hedviga Malinova.

== Political career ==
In 2002 Gál was first elected into parliament on the list of the Party of the Hungarian Community. In 2009 he co-founded the Most–Híd party, which he represented in parliament until 2018. In 2018 he became the minister of justice, serving until the 2020 Slovak parliamentary election, in which his party did not get enough votes to pass the representation threshold.

In May 2022 the Slovak police accused Gál of acts of corruption during his political career.

== Personal life ==
Gál is married to Zsuzsanna Gálová, a schoolteacher. They have three children.
