= Dušan Muňko =

Slovak politician

Member of the National Council
- Incumbent
- Assumed office 21 March 2020

State Secretary of the Ministry of Environment of the Slovak Republic
- In office 19 July 2006 – 20 August 2008

Director General of the Social Insurance Institution
- In office 20 August 2008 – 27 August 2010

Personal details
- Born: 24 September 1944 (age 81) Hontianske Tesáre, Slovak Republic
- Party: Direction – Social Democracy
- Education: Slovak University of Technology in Bratislava
- Occupation: Politician

Dušan Muňko (born 24 September 1944) is a Slovak politician, since 2002 intermittently a current member of the National Council of the Slovak Republic for the SMER – Social Democracy party. He also held the office of State Secretary at the Ministry of Environment and Director General of the Social Insurance Institution.

== Biography ==
Muňko graduated from the Faculty of Mechanical Engineering of the Slovak Technical University. He worked first in industry and since 1976 in the tourism industry in top managerial positions. From 1995 to 2002 he was the CEO of SATUR, a.s.

Muňko is one of the founding members of the SMER party. He has been elected as a member of parliament for Smer for six consecutive terms until 2020. He was a member of the National Assembly of the Slovak Republic for the first time in the 2002–2006 election period for the SMER party, which has been operating under the name SMER – Social Democracy since 1 January 2005; he was a member of the National Assembly Committee for Agriculture. In the subsequent 2006–2010 election period, he did not exercise his mandate as a member of the Parliament; in August 2006 he was appointed State Secretary of the Ministry of Environment of the Slovak Republic, an office he held until August 2008, when he was appointed Director General of the Social Insurance Institution (SIB). He was dismissed from his position in 2010 by the government of Iveta Radičová at the suggestion of Jozef Mihál, but in 2012 the court ruled that this move was illegal and Muňko held the post of Director of the insurance company again in 2012–2016. In the past, Dušan Muňko was a member of the Presidency of the SMER – Social Democracy party and Deputy Chairman of the SMER Shadow Government for Strategic Development and Information Technology. In the 2010–2012 election period, he was a member of the Social Affairs Committee of the Slovak Parliament.

After the 2020 elections, he was re-elected as a member of the National Council of the Slovak Republic and serves as a member of the Finance and Budget Committee of the National Council of the Slovak Republic.

In October 2024, Muňko exited the parliamentary caucus of SMER–SD and entered the caucus of SNS. The move was described as a loan and motivated by "formal-legal reasons", to prevent the dissolution of the SNS caucus, after the departure of three of its members from National Coalition party (Rudolf Huliak, Pavol Ľupták, and Ivan Ševčík). Muňko remained a party member of SMER–SD.
