= Ján Mikolaj =

Slovak politician

Ján Mikolaj (born 19 October 1953) is a Slovak politician, a member of Slovak National Party and the Slovak Education Minister from 2006 to 2010. Formerly, he was a member of Mečiar's Movement for a Democratic Slovakia. After the demission of Igor Štefanov, Mikolaj was also Minister for Construction and Regional Development.
