= Viera Tomanová =

Slovak politician

Minister of Labour of Slovakia
- In office July 4, 2006 – July 9, 2010
- Preceded by: Iveta Radičová
- Succeeded by: Jozef Mihál

Personal details
- Born: February 5, 1948 (age 78)

Viera Tomanová (born February 5, 1948) is a Slovak politician, former Minister of Labour of Slovakia under Prime Minister Robert Fico. As a Minister she became known for her wild statements and many controversies, claiming her dog was poisoned in her house, prompting Prime Minister Fico to accuse Slovak journalists of the deed. She was popular among the elderly citizens for establishing "Christmas pensions", 13th state pensions issued out in December.

== Career ==
She studied Economy at Vysoká škola ekonomická in Bratislava and Social Work at Trnavská univerzita in Trnava.

- 1972 – 1977: Head secretary of the Director of PZCR Javorina, Bratislava
- 1978 – 1982: Head of the social, labour and housing department on MNV Bratislava-Petržalka
- 1982 – 1986: Director of the Retirement home on Hanulova Street in Bratislava
- 1986 – 1987: Social and labour department of DPHMB Bratislava city magistrate
- 1988 – 2003: Head of the Social department and Vice Director

Since 1994 Tomanová is a university teacher at Katedra zdravotníctva a sociálnej práce Trnavskej univerzity and since 2005 also at Vysokej škole zdravotníctva a sociálnej práce sv. Alžbety.

== Ministerial career ==
In 2006, Tomanová became the Minister of Labour, Social matters and Family of Slovakia.

When leaving the office in 2010, she warned the journalists at a press conference of the new government's changes in the social system and called the plan to establish a tax bonus a "neutron bomb".
