= Viera Petríková =

Slovak politician

Viera Petríková (born 29 June 1957) is a former Slovak Justice Minister who served in Fico's First Cabinet. She had previously been chairperson of the Vranov nad Topľou district court.

Government offices
Preceded by Štefan Harabin	Minister of Justice; 2009–2010	Succeeded by Lucia Žitňanská
