= Lucia Žitňanská =

Slovak politician

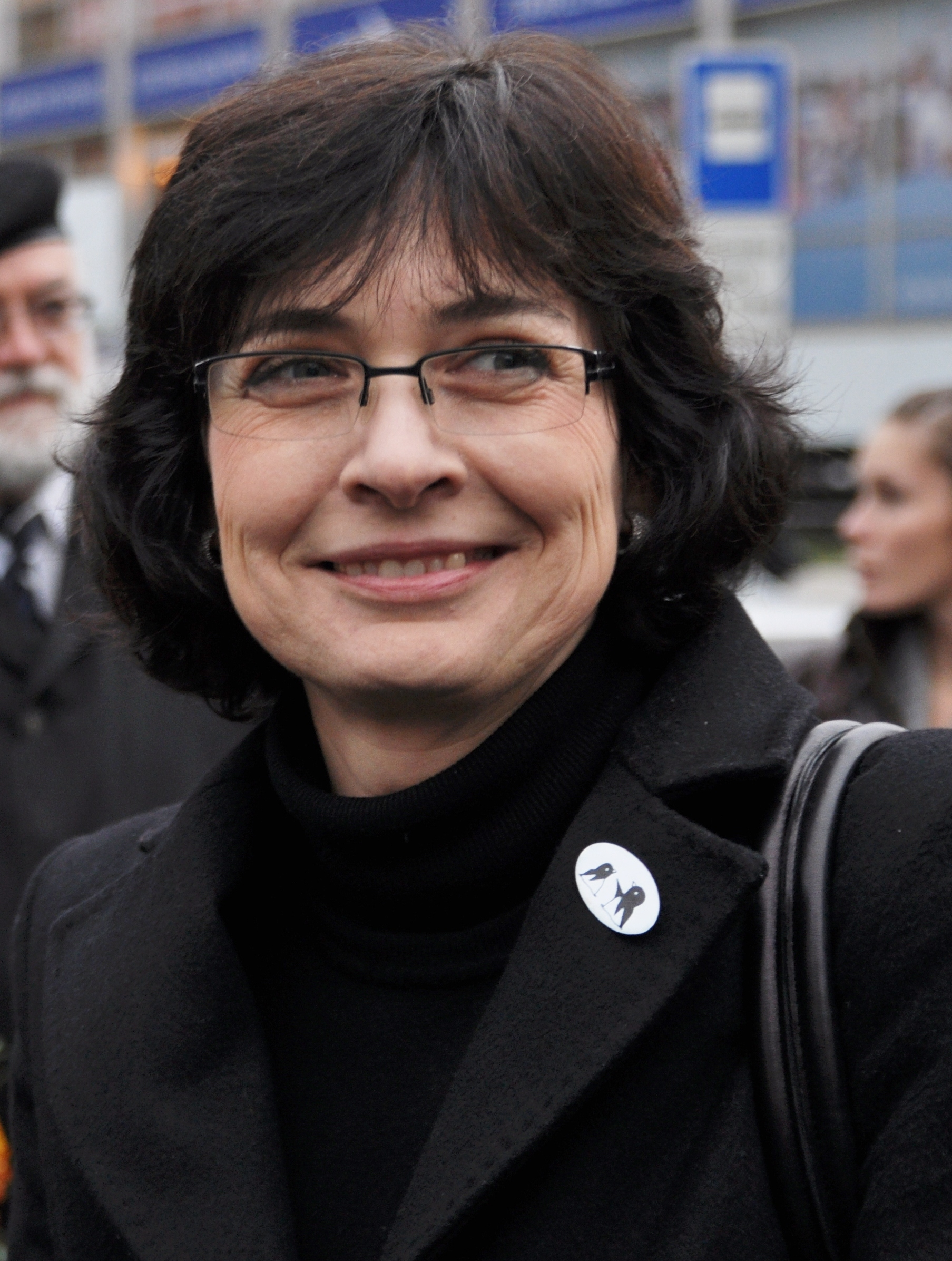

Minister of Justice
- In office 23 March 2016 – 22 March 2018
- Prime Minister: Robert Fico
- Preceded by: Tomáš Borec
- Succeeded by: Gábor Gál
- In office 8 July 2010 – 4 April 2012
- Prime Minister: Iveta Radičová
- Preceded by: Viera Petríková
- Succeeded by: Tomáš Borec
- In office 8 February 2006 – 4 July 2006
- Prime Minister: Mikuláš Dzurinda
- Preceded by: Daniel Lipšic
- Succeeded by: Štefan Harabin

Deputy Prime Minister
- In office 23 March 2016 – 22 March 2018
- Prime Minister: Robert Fico
- In office 8 February 2006 – 4 July 2006
- Prime Minister: Mikuláš Dzurinda
- Preceded by: Daniel Lipšic
- Succeeded by: Štefan Harabin

Personal details
- Born: 3 June 1964 (age 61) Bratislava, Czechoslovakia (now Slovakia)
- Party: Slovak Democratic and Christian Union-Democratic Party (Before 2013); Most–Híd (2013–present)
- Children: 3

Lucia Žitňanská (born 3 June 1964) is a Slovak politician and member of Most–Híd. She served as Minister of Justice in the third government of Robert Fico from 2016 to 2018. In 2006 she served as deputy prime minister and Minister of Justice of Slovakia and in 2010 until 2012 she again served as Minister of Justice in the cabinet of Iveta Radičová.

== Legal career ==
In January 2013, the law firm TaylorWessing e/n/w/c announced to the lawyers that Žitňanská had become its "new reinforcement", wanting to renew her lawyer's license. Since June 2013, she has been named on the list of arbitrators of the Vienna Arbitration Court.

== Political career ==
=== 2012 Slovak parliamentary election ===
In the 2012 Slovak parliamentary election, Žitňanská received almost four times as many votes (103,517), thus ahead of the SDKÚ-DS chairman Mikuláš Dzurinda and vice-chairman Ivan Mikloš, the latter of whom received 56,771 preferential votes.

A few days after the elections, Dzurinda announced that he would not apply for a position in the party's presidency and expressed his support for the presidential candidacy of Žitňanská, whom he entrusted to represent the party at the congress. At the SDKÚ-DS congress on 19 May 2012, she was unsuccessful in the 2014 Slovak presidential election when Pavol Frešo defeated her in the second round. On 27 November, Žitňanská replaced Ľudovít Kaník as chairman of the SDKÚ parliamentary club. On 12 December 2013, she resigned from SDKÚ-DS with Miroslav Beblavý and Magdaléna Vášáryová.

=== Minister of Justice ===
On 8 April 2014, Most–Híd presidency confirmed that Žitňanská, who was an independent politician, would become a member of the party. She promised to hold the position of vice-president, but changed her mind and was not interested.

=== 2016–2018: Slovak parliamentary election and departure from politics ===
After placing second in Most–Híd candidate list during the 2016 Slovak parliamentary election, Žitňanská was appointed Minister of Justice by President Andrej Kiska. She became chairperson of the Legislative Council of the Slovak Government on 11 May. In June 2017, Žitňanská criticised the candidacy of the State Secretary of the Ministry of Justice, Monika Jankovská, to the Judicial Council.

On 14 March 2018, Žitňanská decided not to continue in the new Cabinet of Peter Pellegrini, citing her inability to find the necessary compromises with the coalition partners. She also resigned from Most-Híd the same year on 20 September.

Political offices
Preceded by Daniel Lipšic	Minister of Justice; 2006	Succeeded by Štefan Harabin
Preceded by Viera Petríková	Minister of Justice; 2010–2012	Succeeded by Tomáš Borec
Preceded by Tomáš Borec	Minister of Justice; 2016–2018	Succeeded by Gábor Gál
