= Hrušovany =

Hrušovany may refer to places:

== Czech Republic ==
- Hrušovany (Chomutov District), a municipality and village in the Ústí nad Labem Region
- Hrušovany, a village and part of Polepy (Litoměřice District) in the Ústí nad Labem Region
- Hrušovany nad Jevišovkou, a town in the South Moravian Region
- Hrušovany u Brna, a municipality and village in the South Moravian Region

== Slovakia ==
- Hrušovany, Topoľčany District, a municipality in the Nitra Region
