= Robert Fico =

Prime Minister of Slovakia (2006–2010, 2012–2018, 2023–present)

- Fico in 2026

Prime Minister of Slovakia
- Incumbent
- Assumed office 25 October 2023
- President: Zuzana Čaputová; Peter Pellegrini
- Deputy: See list: Robert Kaliňák; Denisa Saková; Tomáš Taraba; Peter Kmec; Tomáš Drucker; Martina Šimkovičová
- Preceded by: Ľudovít Ódor
- In office 4 April 2012 – 22 March 2018
- President: Ivan Gašparovič; Andrej Kiska
- Deputy: See list: Robert Kaliňák; Peter Kažimír; Miroslav Lajčák; Ľubomír Vážny; Peter Pellegrini; Lucia Žitňanská; Gabriela Matečná
- Preceded by: Iveta Radičová
- Succeeded by: Peter Pellegrini
- In office 4 July 2006 – 8 July 2010
- President: Ivan Gašparovič
- Deputy: See list: Dušan Čaplovič; Robert Kaliňák; Ján Mikolaj; Štefan Harabin; Viera Petríková
- Preceded by: Mikuláš Dzurinda
- Succeeded by: Iveta Radičová

Minister of Environment
- Acting
- Assumed office 30 September 2026
- Prime Minister: Himself
- Preceded by: Tomáš Taraba

Minister of Justice
- Acting; 26 March 2009 – 3 July 2009
- Prime Minister: Himself
- Preceded by: Štefan Harabin
- Succeeded by: Viera Petríková

Deputy Speaker of the National Council
- In office 9 July 2010 – 4 April 2012 Serving with Béla Bugár, Milan Hort and Pavol Hrušovský
- Speaker: Richard Sulík; Pavol Hrušovský

Member of the National Council
- In office 22 March 2018 – 25 October 2023
- In office 8 July 2010 – 4 April 2012
- In office 23 June 1992 – 4 July 2006

Chairman of Direction – Social Democracy
- Incumbent
- Assumed office 8 November 1999
- Preceded by: Office established

Personal details
- Born: 15 September 1964 (age 62) Topoľčany, Czechoslovakia
- Party: Direction – Social Democracy (since 1999)
- Other political affiliations: Communist Party of Czechoslovakia (1986–1990); Party of the Democratic Left (1990–1999)
- Spouse: Svetlana Svobodová (m. 1988)
- Children: 1
- Education: Comenius University (JUDr.); Slovak Academy of Sciences (CSc.)

Military service
- Allegiance: Czechoslovakia/Slovakia
- Branch/service: Czechoslovak People's Army
- Years of service: 1986–1987
- Rank: Lieutenant colonel

Robert Fico (Note: /ˈfiːt.soʊ/, FEET-soh; Slovak pronunciation: [ˈrɔbert ˈfitsɔ]) (born 15 September 1964) is a Slovak politician and lawyer, who has served as the prime minister of Slovakia since 2023. Fico holds the distinction as the longest-serving prime minister in the country's history. His collective time in power spans over 13 years across four distinct mandates (2006–2010, 2012–2016, 2016–2018, and the current one since 2023). He founded the left-wing political party Direction – Social Democracy in 1999 and has led the party since. His political positions have been variously described as populist, left-wing and conservative.

First elected to parliament in 1992, he was appointed the following year to the Czechoslovak delegation of the Parliamentary Assembly of the Council of Europe. (Note: Fico was appointed during a brief window in 1993 when a body referenced as the "Czechoslovak delegation" or its immediate successor was still active at the PACE, representing the interests of the newly independent republics before their full, separate membership was formalized.) Following his party's victory in the 2006 parliamentary election, he formed his first Cabinet, having secured 29.1% of the vote and 50 seats. After the 2010 parliamentary election, Fico served as an opposition member of parliament, effectively holding the position of the leader of the opposition, despite winning the most votes with 34.8% and securing 62 seats. Following a motion of no confidence against the Iveta Radičová cabinet, Fico was re-appointed prime minister after leading Direction – Social Democracy to a landslide election victory in the 2012 parliamentary election, winning 44.41% of the vote and 83 seats, forming a government with an absolute majority in Parliament, the first such since 1989. In 2013, Fico declared his candidacy for the 2014 presidential election, but ultimately lost to his political rival Andrej Kiska in the second round of voting.

Fico began his third term as prime minister after Direction – Social Democracy won a plurality of the vote in the 2016 parliamentary election, securing 28.28% of the vote and 49 seats, subsequently forming a coalition government. In March 2018, owing to the political crisis following the murder of Ján Kuciak, Fico delivered his resignation to President Kiska, who then charged Deputy Prime Minister Peter Pellegrini with the formation of a new government. In the 2020 parliamentary election, his party finished second with 18.29% of the vote and 38 seats. Fico served in opposition from 2020 to 2023, a period marked by a significant split of his party, and a subsequent shift toward a populist platform. Following the 2023 parliamentary election, Fico's party emerged as the largest with 22.95% of the vote and 42 seats, which led to him forming his fourth Cabinet and returning as prime minister.

== Early life and education ==
Fico was born on 15 September 1964 in the town of Topoľčany, northwestern Nitra Region then part of the Czechoslovak Socialist Republic. His father, Ľudovit Fico, was a forklift operator, and his mother, Emilie Ficová, worked in a shoe store. He has two siblings. His brother Ladislav is a construction entrepreneur, and his sister Lucia Chabadová, who is fourteen years younger, is a prosecutor. Fico grew up and lived with his family in the village of Hrušovany, until the age of six, when they moved to the nearby town of Topoľčany.

Fico has described his childhood ambitions as wanting to become either a politician, a sports reporter, or an archaeologist. After completing elementary school, he enrolled in the local gymnasium of Topoľčany, graduating in the summer of 1982. Later the same year, he enrolled in the Law Faculty of the Comenius University in Bratislava. His teachers were impressed with him, and one of his teachers from university, the future prime minister Jozef Moravčík, described him as "ambitious, very confident, and very involved in discussions." He graduated as a juris doctor in 1986, specializing in criminal law.

After graduating from university, Fico completed his mandatory military service as an assistant military investigator, stationed in the now-Czech town of Janovice, between 1986 and 1987. He later worked for the Institute of State and Law of the Slovak Academy of Sciences, as well as with the Justice Ministry until 1992. During this period, he wrote and completed his PhD degree, with a thesis on "The death penalty in Czechoslovakia". In the early 1990s, he undertook studies at the School of Slavonic and East European Studies in London under a Masaryk scholarship. In 2002, he completed his postgraduate study, earning him the title of associate professor.

== Early career (1992–2006) ==
Fico joined the Communist Party of Czechoslovakia in 1986, having applied in 1984. After the Velvet Revolution of 1989, and the collapse of the Communist regime in Czechoslovakia, Fico joined the Party of the Democratic Left (SDĽ), a successor of the Communist Party of Slovakia. He was first elected as a member of parliament in 1992. In 1998, he was elected deputy chairman of the party. Later in 1998, Fico ran for the post of general prosecutor; his party endorsed another candidate instead, arguing that Fico was too young.

In the 1998 elections that saw the fall of the government of Vladimír Mečiar, Fico received the biggest number of preferential votes among his party colleagues. A year later, when support for the SDĽ dropped below the threshold required to get into parliament, he left the party, saying he was disappointed with the way the government worked. As early as the autumn of 1998, a four-person group consisting of Fico, his associate Frantisek Határ, political strategist Fedor Flašík, and media executive Monika Flašíková-Beňová had begun to discuss and lay plans for launching a new political party. These plans were driven by the falling popularity of the existing parties and the rising popularity of Fico.

Almost immediately after leaving SDĽ, the group founded Direction (SMER), which Fico first labelled a party of the third way, with himself as leader. Fico established himself as an opposition politician, criticizing the unpopular reforms of the right-wing government of Mikuláš Dzurinda. To keep SMER from repeating the fate of his previous party, Fico introduced a strict set of regulations for his new party, called the "clean hands" policy. The rules stipulated that no one with ties to the previous Communist regime or people who had a background with other political parties was allowed to hold party office. This created a new generation of politicians uninvolved in previous corruption scandals; among them was Monika Flašíková-Beňová, Robert Kaliňák, and Pavol Paška. Another rule was that all party chapters on the regional and local levels were to be 100% financially self-sufficient, and all financial donations were to be made public to the media.

Between 2002 and 2006, Direction – Social Democracy was the main opposition party in the Slovak parliament. In 2004, it merged with nearly all the leftist parties active on the Slovak political scene, including its parent party SDĽ, becoming the single most dominant political party in Slovakia.

== First premiership (2006–2010) ==
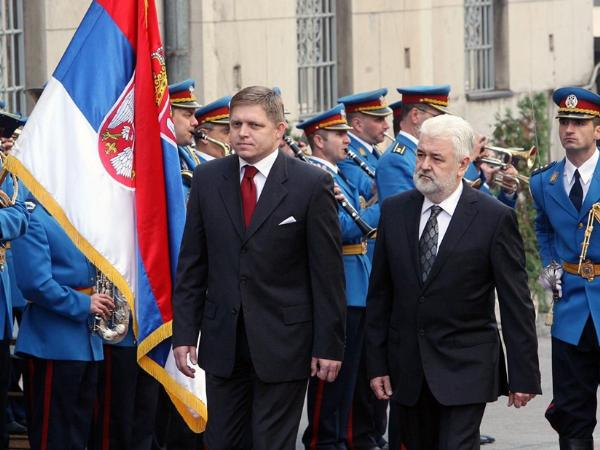
Fico with Serbian prime minister Mirko Cvetkovic, during official visit of Serbia, October 2008

In the 2006 Slovak parliamentary election, the Direction – Social Democracy party secured a victory, winning 50 seats and 29.1% of the vote. A significant factor in this success was Fico's criticism of the previous right-wing government's economic, tax, social, pension, and legislative reforms. These reforms had been endorsed by international bodies, including the International Monetary Fund (IMF), the World Bank, and the OECD. Fico promised to reverse several deeply unpopular austerity measures that had been implemented in the healthcare and education sectors under the previous administration, specifically associated with ministers Rudolf Zajac and Martin Fronc.

Following the election, Direction – Social Democracy successfully formed a coalition government. This government included Vladimír Mečiar's People's Party – Movement for a Democratic Slovakia (HZDS) and the Slovak National Party (SNS), led by Ján Slota. The SNS is a right-wing populist party whose leadership has been known for making anti-Roma and anti-Hungarian remarks. These included a drunken public speech by Slota, in which he threatened to "get in tanks and level Budapest to the ground".

The inclusion of SNS immediately created strain in Slovakia's international relations. During this period, relations with neighboring Hungary deteriorated. A series of scheduled meetings between the Slovak and Hungarian prime ministers were cancelled or postponed, and those that did occur yielded minimal progress in improving the bilateral relationship.

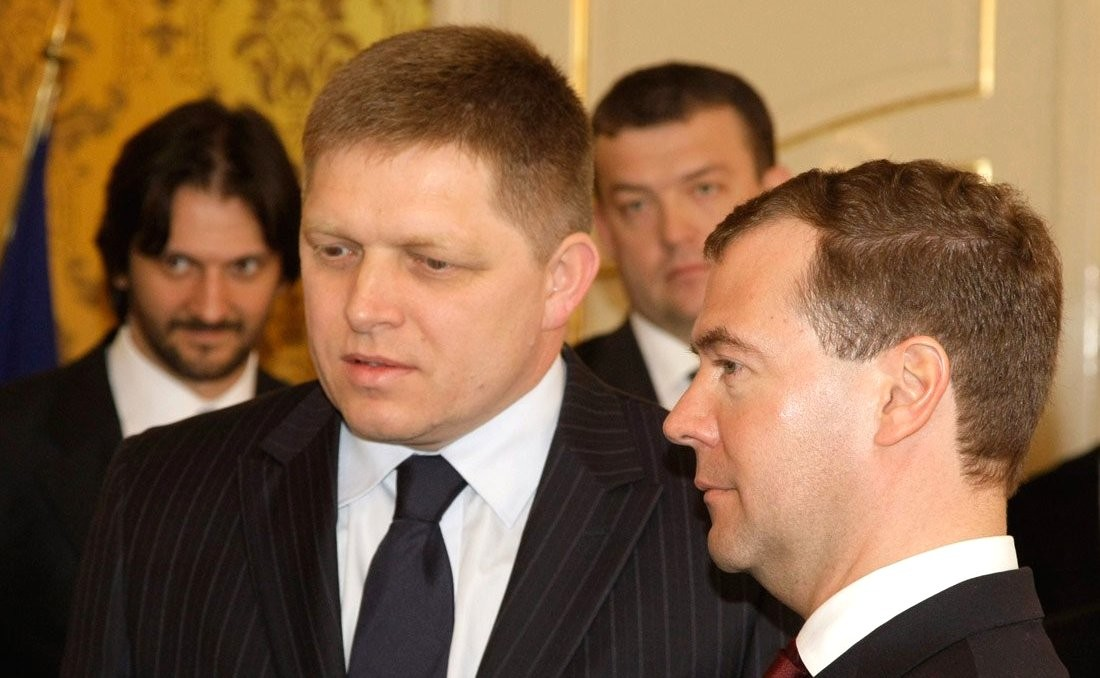
Fico with Russian president Dmitry Medvedev, April 2010

=== Schengen Area ===
Slovakia joined the Schengen Area, which abolished checks at internal borders with fellow member states, on 21 December 2007. The successful accession was seen as a major achievement of the country's post-communist integration into European structures. At the time, Fico and his government strongly insisted on the planned 2007 accession date, pushing back against suggestions from some older EU members to delay the enlargement until 2008 or 2009. Fico celebrated the event, declaring that Slovakia had achieved a key strategic goal alongside EU membership and likened Schengen accession to the significance of the year 1989.

In 2015, Fico was a vocal proponent of strengthening the Schengen Area's external borders, particularly during the European migrant crisis. He criticized the reintroduction of internal border controls as a potential threat to the EU's free movement principle.

=== Party of European Socialists ===
Fico's political party, Direction – Social Democracy, was first accepted into the Party of European Socialists (PES) as a provisional member. The PES suspended the party in October 2006 after it formed a government coalition with the nationalist Slovak National Party (SNS).

The party's provisional membership was restored on 14 February 2008, after Direction–Social Democracy and the Slovak National Party signed a letter committing themselves to respect minority rights and European values. Fico achieved full membership in the PES on 8 December 2009, at the European Socialist Congress in Prague.

=== Global financial crisis ===
Slovakia was affected by the 2008 financial crisis and the Great Recession due to its highly open and export-dependent economy. The main impact came not from a domestic banking crisis, but from the collapse of foreign demand for its industrial products, particularly cars and electronics. After enjoying exceptionally high GDP growth in the preceding years, the country experienced a dramatic contraction in 2009, suffering one of the steepest economic declines among developed nations. This immediate and sharp downturn was a direct result of the plunging export volumes to key trading partners, especially Germany.

In response, the Fico cabinet announced several crisis packages in early 2009, including a commitment of funds to support businesses and the introduction of more flexible labor legislation, while aiming to avoid significantly increasing the budget deficit. Fico's focus during this time was on preserving employment and maintaining economic stability amid the global recession.

A crucial mitigating factor was the country's successful entry into the Eurozone on 1 January 2009. This provided a stable currency anchor, shielding Slovakia from the severe exchange rate volatility and financial panic that affected non-Eurozone neighbors like Hungary and Poland. Despite this stability, the real economy saw mass lay-offs and a severe slowdown in its major production sectors. In essence, while the financial system was protected by joining the euro, the industrial economy was severely battered by the collapse in global trade.

=== Introduction of the Euro ===
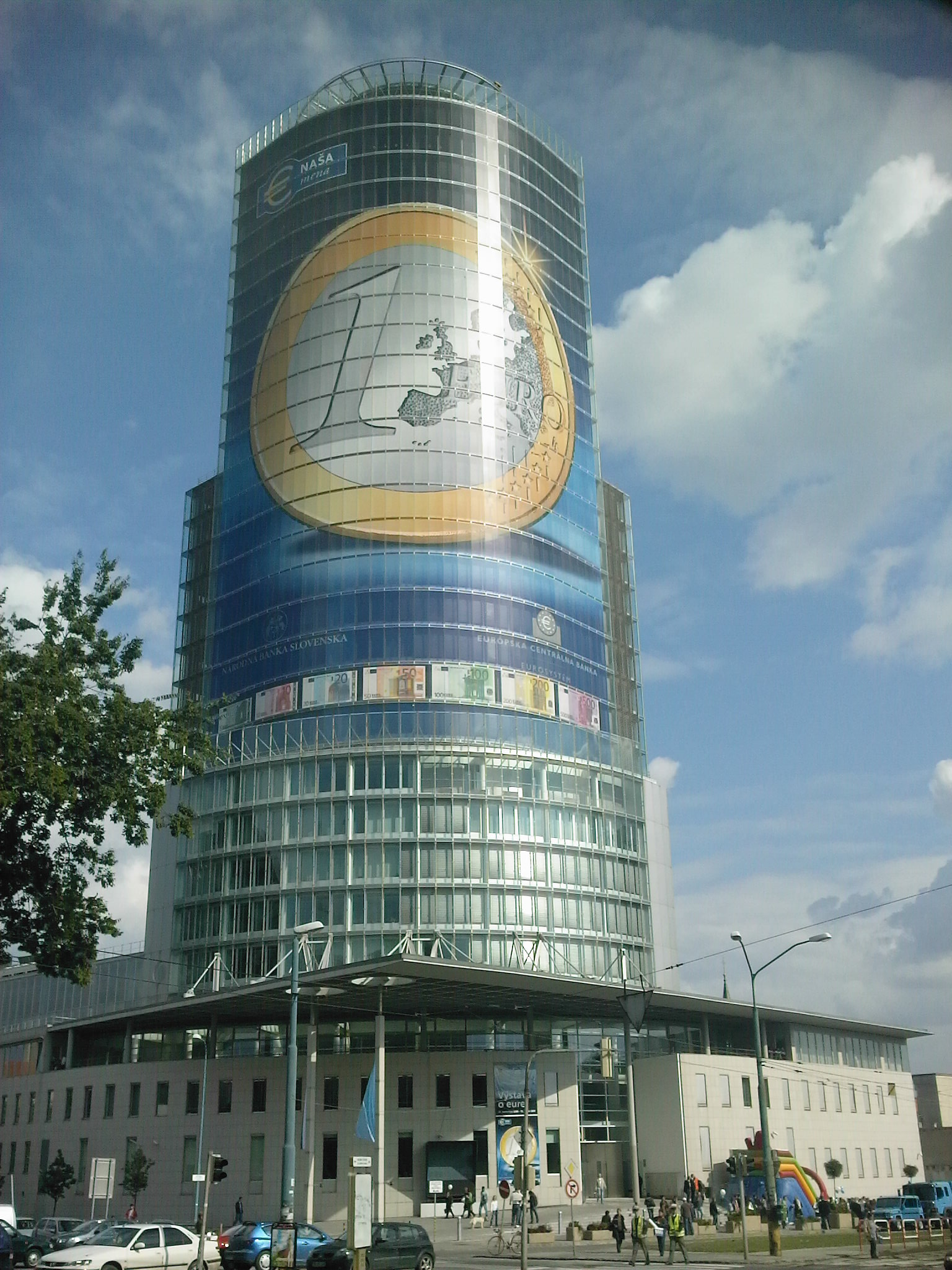
Decoration at the building of National Bank of Slovakia in September 2008, ahead of Slovakia's adoption of the euro

During the 2008 financial crisis, Fico led the government's most significant achievement: successfully bringing the country into the Eurozone on 1 January 2009, becoming the 16th member of the Eurozone. This move was the completion of a process that had been started by the previous administration.

Slovakia's successful adherence to the Maastricht criteria—resulting in a relatively balanced budget and low public debt—is widely credited with helping the country withstand the initial shock better than many neighbors. However, as a small, highly open, and export-dependent economy, Slovakia was still severely impacted by a sharp drop in foreign demand, forcing the government to repeatedly slash its GDP growth forecasts.

Fico publicly championed the euro, viewing it as a vital strategic move to solidify the country's economic stability. He often emphasized that joining the Eurozone would be a major advantage, especially since it occurred during the height of the global financial crisis, arguing the euro would serve as a "protective shield".

On the day of the changeover from the Slovak koruna, Fico made a symbolic withdrawal of euros from an ATM. He was quoted as stating: "We are very happy in Slovakia because we believe that Europe will be a big success for Slovakia. Of course, we are also happy because we are going to introduce the euro at a time of deep economic crisis and Europe can be very helpful for us". He stated that the euro would "attract investors to Slovakia" and "stabilize Slovakia as a whole". He added, "The euro has come to Slovakia on New Year's Day 2009 as the best talisman one can imagine”. The introduction of the euro under Fico's premiership was seen as a key step in integration into the core of the European Union.

=== Slovak–Ukraine gas dispute (2009) ===
The 2009 Russia-Ukraine gas dispute created a severe energy crisis for Slovakia. When all Russian gas flow through Ukraine was stopped on 7 January 2009, Slovakia, along with other Central and Eastern European nations, was among the most heavily affected, forcing the Slovak government to immediately declare a state of emergency.

Faced with dwindling domestic reserves that could only cover industrial and household needs for a short period, Fico personally traveled to Kyiv to meet with his Ukrainian counterpart, Yulia Tymoshenko, to demand an immediate resolution. Fico later visited Moscow where he said Ukraine was "losing the trust of European partners because of its behaviour".

As a desperate measure, Fico suggested that the government might need to resort to the "non-standard solution" of restarting the decommissioned second block of the Jaslovské Bohunice nuclear power plant to generate necessary electricity. The crisis was resolved on 18 January and Slovakia ended its state of emergency on 20 January.

=== Truckers blockade ===
In January 2010, Fico's government faced large-scale protests and a blockade of major cities by truckers, organized primarily by the Union of Road Transporters (UNAS). The protests were a strong demonstration of public opposition against the new electronic highway toll collection system launched on 1 January 2010. Truckers blockaded thoroughfares, demanding that fuel prices be lowered to offset the impact of the new tolls.

Fico initially refused to negotiate, stating he would not be "blackmailed," and constitutional officials, including Fico, condemned the media and opposition for allegedly supporting the law-breaking activities. Ultimately, after massive pressure, Fico yielded to the truckers' demands on 11 January, promising to lower the excise tax on diesel fuel.

=== Leaked voice recording ===
Shortly before the 2010 general election a voice recording, allegedly featuring a voice highly resembling Fico's, was published by the newspaper Sme on its website. In the recording, the speaker discussed potentially securing several million euros in undeclared funds for the 2002 election campaign and suggested establishing a "parallel financial structure" to support Direction – Social Democracy's future election endeavors.

Slovak media outlets covered the recording and its implications. Fico officially dismissed the recording, stating it was a forgery. Fico's reaction to the media outlets publishing this information was expressed in vulgar terms, stating: "The fact that you're all going to masturbate over this now—I hope you have a pleasant sexual experience".

The newspaper Sme later wrote that Fico had been questioned by the police concerning the matter. Former Minister of Justice Daniel Lipšic informed the press that he had officially submitted the recording to the General Attorney's Office for review.

== Leader of the Opposition (2010–2012) ==
In the 2010 Slovak parliamentary election, Fico's Direction – Social Democracy finished as the strongest party, securing a significant victory with 34.8% of the vote and 62 seats—an increase of 12 seats from the previous election. Despite this plurality, Fico faced a substantial setback in his ability to govern. Fico's coalition partners suffered crippling losses; the People's Party – Movement for a Democratic Slovakia failed to cross the 5% threshold, being shut out of parliament entirely, while the Slovak National Party was reduced to just nine seats. This decimation meant that Fico's coalition could no longer command a majority in the 150-seat National Council, reaching only 71 seats.

Although President Ivan Gašparovič initially tasked Fico with forming the new cabinet as the leader of the largest party, he was unable to secure a parliamentary majority due to the firm refusal of all other parties to join a government with him. Consequently, the government formation mandate passed to the centre-right, which coalesced around a four-party agreement. Fico said he "respects the election result" and expressed his desire to lead a resolute opposition.

== Second premiership (2012–2016) ==
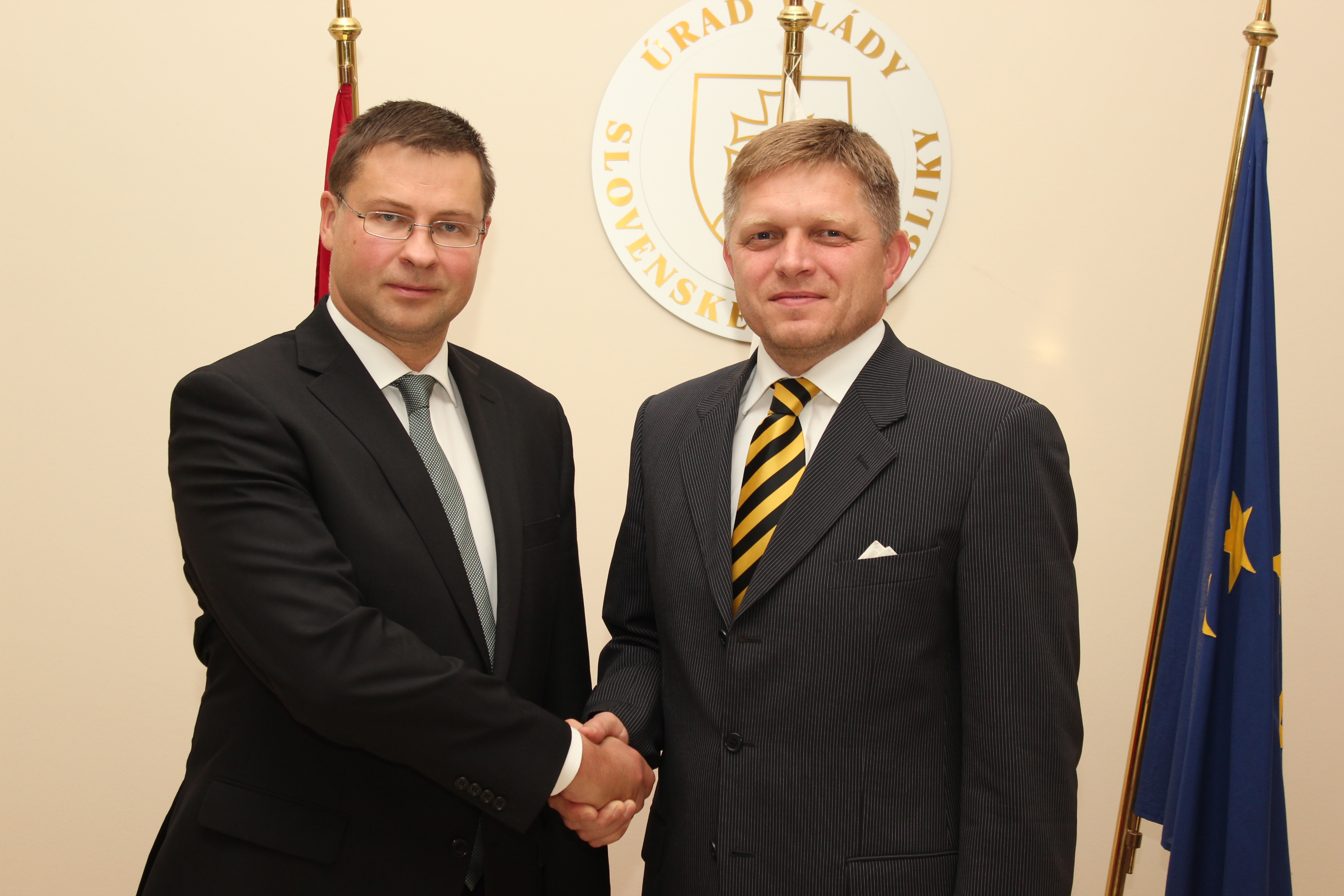
Fico with Prime Minister of Latvia Valdis Dombrovskis in Bratislava, October 2012

Following the fall of the centre-right coalition government, Fico's Direction – Social Democracy party returned to power in the 2012 parliamentary election. Direction – Social Democracy secured 44.42% of the popular vote, which resulted in 83 out of 150 seats in the National Council. This outcome marked a significant electoral event, as Direction – Social Democracy became the first single party since the breakup of Czechoslovakia to win an absolute majority of seats.

Fico initially sought to form a national unity government with parties such as SDKÚ-DS or KDH. When these coalition efforts were unsuccessful, Direction – Social Democracy proceeded to form the first one-party government in Slovakia since 1993.

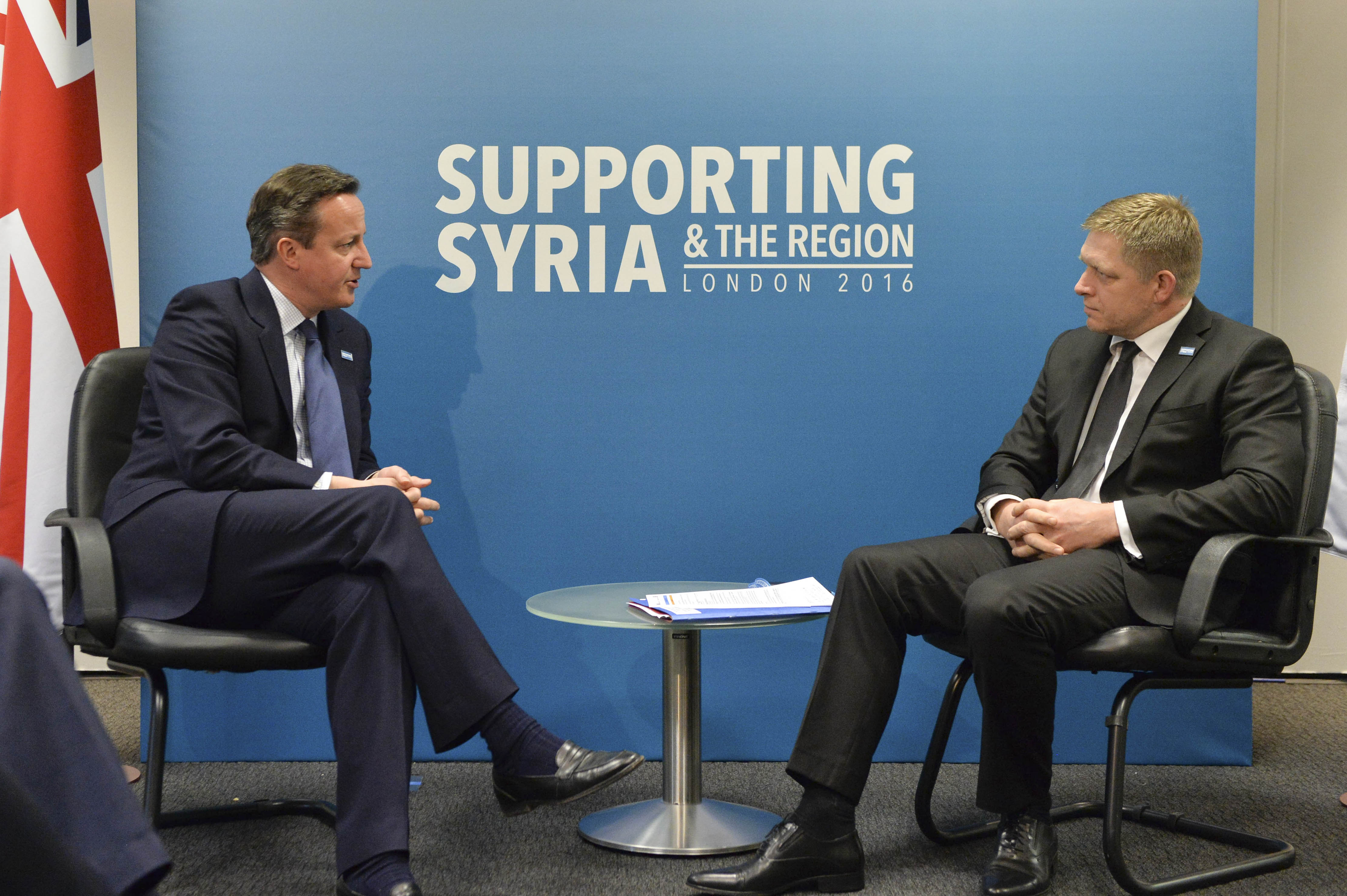
Fico with UK Prime Minister David Cameron in London, February 2016

=== Candidacy for President ===
On 18 December 2013, Fico officially announced his candidacy for the upcoming 2014 presidential election. He said: "I understand my candidacy as a service to Slovakia." He argued that he did not see his candidacy as an adventure, an escape, or an attempt to culminate his political career. His campaign ran under the motto "Ready for Slovakia". On 9 January 2014, the Slovak Parliament, under Speaker Pavol Paška, officially approved the candidatures of Fico and 14 other candidates. Fico was defeated by the independent candidate Andrej Kiska, whose support from the Slovak right wing led him to victory by a wide margin (approximately 59%–41%) in the second round of voting on 29 March 2014.

=== European migrant crisis ===
The 2015 European migrant crisis fundamentally shaped Fico's political platform, driving him to adopt an explicit, hardline anti-immigration stance. He opposed the EU's mandatory quota mechanism designed to redistribute 120,000 asylum seekers across member states from Greece and Italy. Fico described the EU's migration policy as a "ritual suicide" for the bloc and said that Slovakia would "never" accept the quotas. His government filed a lawsuit against the European Union at the European Court of Justice in December 2015, challenging the legality of the quota decision.

Fico described the crisis as a major security threat, stating that his government was "monitoring" the Muslim community after the November 2015 Paris attacks. He said that Slovakia would prefer to accept only Christian refugees and that it would be impossible to integrate Muslim communities into Slovakia's predominantly Catholic society. His strong focus on border protection and his nationalist, anti-immigrant campaign was highly effective, helping his Direction – Social Democracy party secure a victory in the March 2016 general election.

== Third premiership (2016–2018) ==
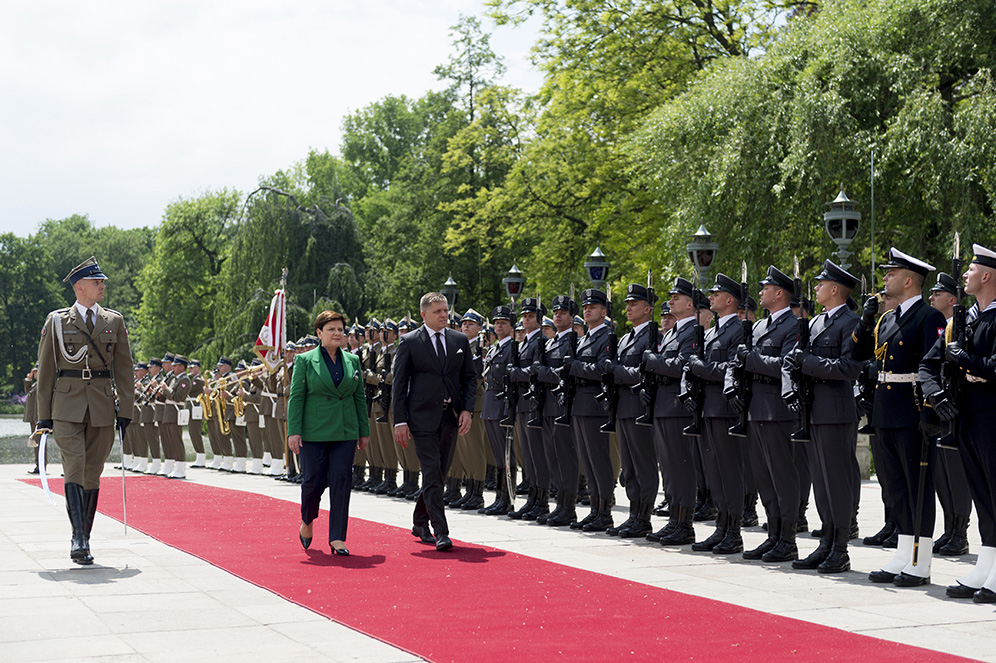
Fico with prime minister of Poland Beata Szydło in Warsaw, during official visit of Poland, May 2017

Following the 2016 parliamentary elections, Fico's party, Direction – Social Democracy, secured a plurality, obtaining 49 seats and 28.3% of the vote, though it did not achieve a majority.

Fico was tasked with forming a viable governing coalition, a process he concluded on 17 March with the announcement of a four-party government. The composition of this coalition was particularly notable due to the inclusion of two groups previously regarded as ideological antagonists: the nationalist Slovak National Party and Most–Híd, a party focused on cooperation with the ethnic Hungarian minority. The resulting four-party government coalition, composed of Direction – Social Democracy, the Slovak National Party, Most–Híd, and Network, was sworn into office on 23 March 2016.

=== EU Council Presidency ===
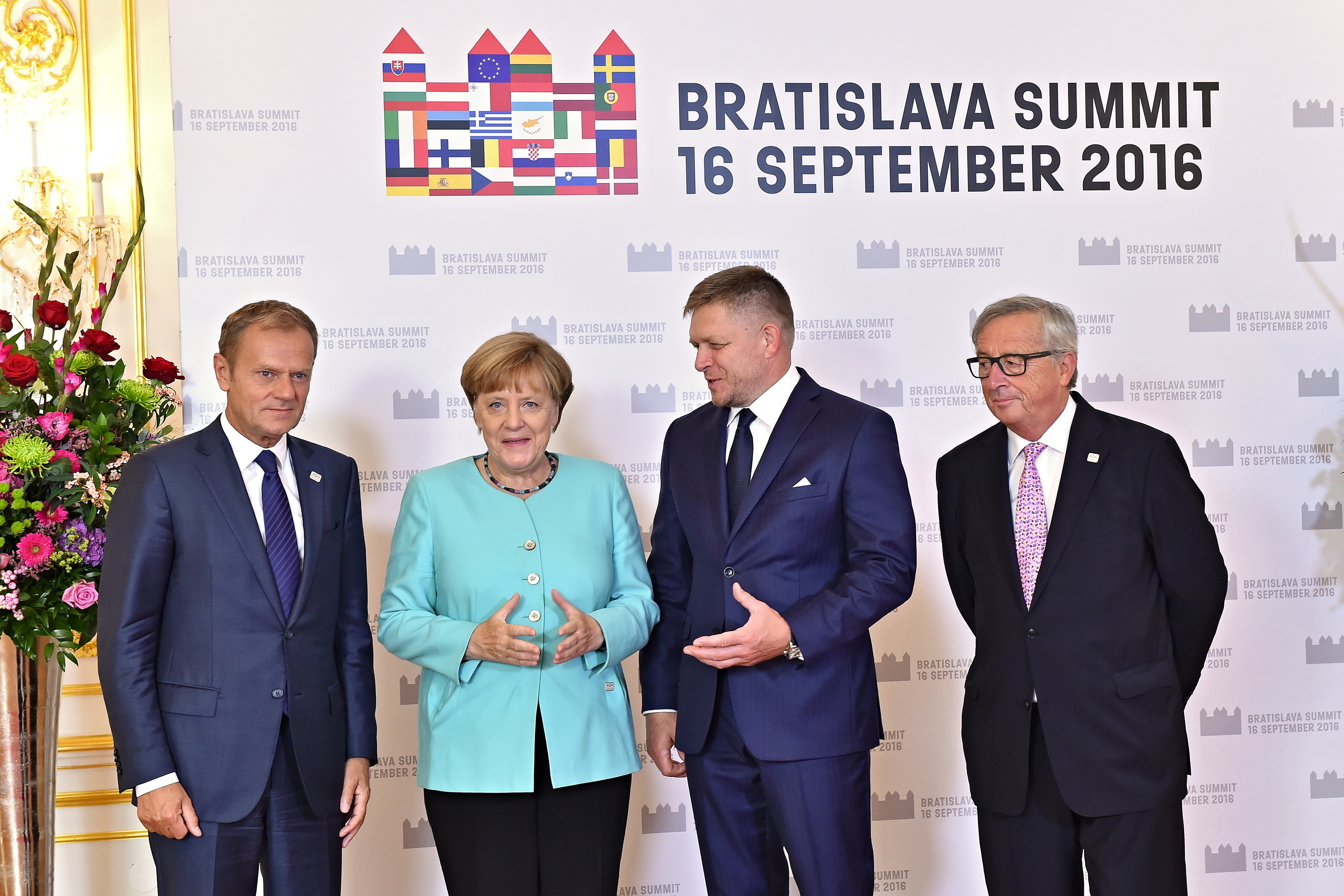
Fico standing with Donald Tusk, Angela Merkel and Jean-Claude Juncker during informal EU summit in Bratislava, September 2016

Fico led Slovakia during its first-ever Presidency of the Council of the European Union, which spanned the second half of 2016 following the Brexit referendum. In his address, Fico said that EU citizens must be at the heart of the Union's future agenda and called for the EU to be less "elitist", framing the bloc's future in terms of "openness, honesty, and simplicity".

The presidency's biggest event was the informal Bratislava Summit of the EU-27, first major meeting of EU leaders without the United Kingdom following the Brexit referendum. Its purpose was to diagnose the EU's challenges together and begin the political process of defining its future.

The Slovak Presidency was generally seen by EU officials as a successful and well-managed one, efficiently delivering on a heavy legislative agenda. Among the tangible achievements under Fico's leadership were the launch of the European Border and Coast Guard (Frontex), the finalization of the EU-Canada trade deal (CETA), and the adoption of the 2017 EU budget.

Based on its opposition to mandatory refugee quotas, the Slovak Presidency's main success in the migration debate was the successful introduction of "effective solidarity" at the Bratislava Summit. This concept was championed by Fico to offer a flexible alternative to relocation, allowing EU member states to contribute to migration management through financial aid, equipment, or border assistance—a diplomatic victory that helped shift the EU focus toward strengthening external border control.

=== Brexit ===
Fico stated that Brexit would be painful for Britain. He said that the European Union must emerge more successful from the negotiations to prevent Brexit from becoming an example for other countries to follow. In an interview, he said, "It will be very difficult for the UK, very difficult". He said the EU's strategy was to "take this opportunity to show the public: 'listen guys, now you will see why it is important to stay in the EU.' This will be the position".

Fico dismissed the UK's confidence in the negotiations as a "bluff". He said that the EU will not allow Britain to "cherry-pick" benefits like the Single Market without accepting the corresponding obligations, including the treatment of EU workers and the free movement of people. In November 2016, Fico stated that the United Kingdom "must suffer" more than the 27 countries that would remain in the bloc.

=== Murder of Ján Kuciak ===
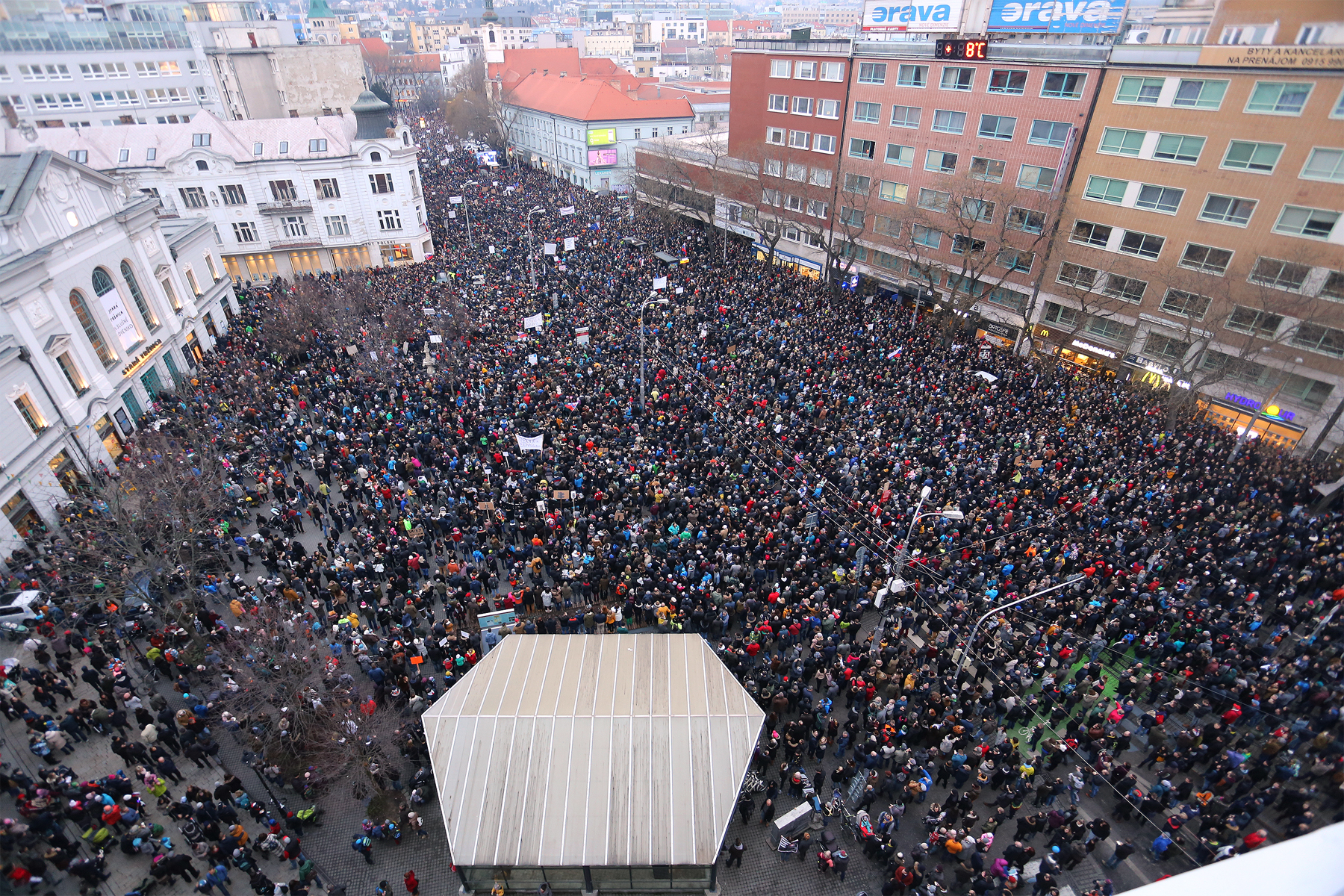
One of the protests in Bratislava, which resulted in the resignation of Fico and his government, March 2018

The murder of investigative journalist Ján Kuciak and his fiancée Martina Kušnírová in February 2018 sent shockwaves through Slovakia and immediately ignited a political crisis for the government led by Fico. Kuciak's final, posthumously published article detailed alleged links between high-ranking Slovak state officials and Italian businessmen with ties to organized crime, including the Italian mafia 'Ndrangheta. The article mentioned Mária Trošková, an assistant to Fico, and Viliam Jasaň, Secretary of the National Security Council, as having connections to one of the Italian businessmen. Kuciak alleged that Slovak businessmen, who had links to the Calabrian mafia, were embezzling EU structural funds.

Fico responded by offering €1 million for information leading to the murderers, displaying packs of cash during a press conference with the Interior Minister and Police President. He also warned against the "political abuse of a tragedy". The investigation into the murder later led to the accusation that prominent businessman Marián Kočner, a frequent subject of Kuciak's investigative work and a figure reported to have links to Fico's Direction – Social Democracy party, had ordered the hit. The revelations, combined with the public's view that the government was failing to tackle corruption, triggered the largest anti-government street protests in Slovakia since the 1989 Velvet Revolution, demanding Fico's resignation, eventually forcing him and his entire cabinet to step down in March 2018.

=== George Soros ===
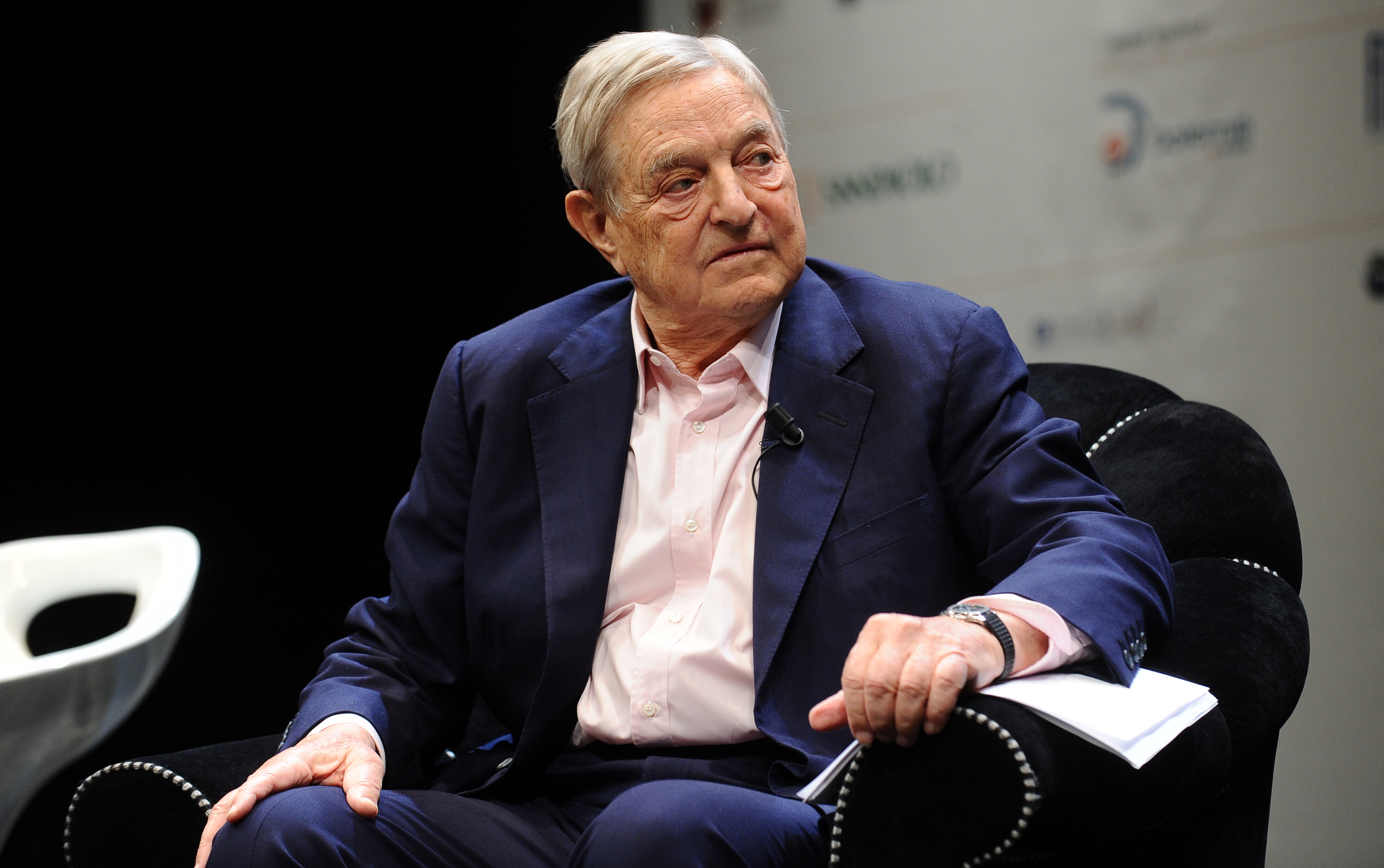
George Soros, financier and philanthropist whom Fico has repeatedly and publicly accused of orchestrating political instability and influencing the media in Slovakia

In March 2018, following the murder of investigative journalist Ján Kuciak and the resulting mass anti-government protests, Fico publicly accused President Andrej Kiska of colluding with American-Hungarian financier and philanthropist George Soros to destabilize Slovakia and bring down his administration.

Fico cited a private meeting between Kiska and Soros in New York in September 2017 as evidence that the President's subsequent call for government reconstruction or early elections was driven by foreign influence. Soros's Open Society Foundations rejected the claims, stating that the meeting with President Kiska had been focused on humanitarian topics such as the integration of the Roma community and that Soros played no role in the protests or political crisis.

At a press conference on 5 March 2018, Fico said, "I want to pose a simple question to Mr. President. On 20 September 2017 in New York, on 5th Avenue, I am asking, why the Head of State would pay a visit on private soil to a person, who has questionable reputation and this person's name is George Soros".

Fico asked why Kiska did not take a representative of the Foreign Affairs Ministry to the meeting, suggesting this proved the meeting was nefarious. Fico then directly linked the meeting to the political fallout, stating that "What happened after the murder of the journalists suggest that there is an attempt in this country for a total destabilisation," thereby accusing Soros of attempting to overthrow his democratically elected government.

Fico's accusation mirrored that of Hungarian Prime Minister Viktor Orbán, who had accused Soros of interfering in Hungarian politics. Fico said Kiska's call for government changes was not "written in Slovakia," but was guided by Soros, suggesting a coup was being plotted against him.

=== Resignation ===
On 14 March 2018, Fico publicly stated that he was ready to tender his resignation as prime minister in order to avoid a snap election, as well as to "solve the political crisis" involving the murder of investigative journalist Ján Kuciak.

Fico's announcement came after a meeting with President Kiska. In that meeting, Fico laid out several specific conditions that needed to be met by the president for him to resign. Those conditions were, amongst others, that the result of the 2016 Slovak parliamentary election be respected, that the current ruling government coalition must continue, and that Direction – Social Democracy, as the largest party currently in parliament, name the next prime minister. Fico stated that he already had a candidate in mind. Slovak media widely reported that the next prime minister would be Deputy Prime Minister Peter Pellegrini. On 15 March, President Kiska formally accepted the resignation of prime minister Fico and his cabinet, and thereby tasked Pellegrini with forming a new government.

Upon tendering his resignation, Fico declared, “I told the president: 'You can relax, I'm not leaving politics, I want to be an active party leader.'" He also stated, “I'm sure that a decision to create a new government is the right step. An early election would not bring any stability.” This maneuver allowed the existing three-party ruling coalition to remain in power.

== Political wilderness (2018–2020) ==
Following his 2018 resignation, Fico entered the political wilderness for several years. Despite stepping down as prime minister, he maintained an active role as leader of his party.

=== Candidacy for judge ===
Fico's failed attempt to become a Constitutional Court judge took place in early 2019, less than a year after his resignation as prime minister. He was among the candidates nominated to replace nine outgoing judges, with reports suggesting he aspired to chair the Court. His candidacy faced significant opposition, particularly concerning his legal experience, as critics questioned whether he met the required 15 years of practice. Fico withdrew his candidacy after his coalition partner, the Most-Hid political party, refused to support him.

== Leader of the Opposition (2020–2023) ==
Direction – Social Democracy remained in power until the 2020 parliamentary elections, where they finished second with 18.29% of the vote and 38 seats, consequently losing the ability to form a government.

Fico moved into the opposition. During his time out of power, Fico actively prepared for a return, often using aggressive and polarizing rhetoric against his opponents. Amidst this political turmoil, he issued the statement, “God – we will drive them out (…) not even an oily spot will remain (after them),” promising retribution against those he considered political enemies.

=== The split of Fico's party ===
The split of the Direction – Social Democracy party in 2020 was a consequence of internal power struggles and a significant electoral defeat under Peter Pellegrini's parliamentary leadership in the 2020 election that sent the party back into opposition. In the 2020 parliamentary election, Pellegrini secured approximately 170,000 more personal preferential votes than Fico, emboldening his ambition to challenge Fico for the party's chair.

Fico resisted calls to resign the chair, condemning the rising disloyalty with the statement: "The nation always likes betrayal, but hates traitors". In June 2020, Pellegrini and several key allies resigned to form a new party, Voice – Social Democracy. This major split decimated Direction – Social Democracy's support, forcing Fico to reorient the party's ideological focus towards a more nationalist, populist, and conservative.

=== COVID-19 pandemic ===
The new government's mismanagement of the COVID-19 pandemic response led to a crisis, culminating in early 2021 when Slovakia recorded one of the highest hospitalization and death rates per million inhabitants across European countries. In December 2021, Fico was detained by police for organizing an anti-government rally that breached Slovakia's lockdown rules. Fico justified his anti-COVID stance by vocally opposing mandatory vaccinations as a "disgusting fascist idea" and claiming that influenza posed a greater danger than the virus.

In July 2022, the think tank Visegrad Insight described Fico as one of the "most important individual disseminators of politically motivated disinformation and conspiratorial content".

According to media outlet VSquare, Fico capitalised on the political chaos and mismanagement of the government between 2020 and 2023. His uncompromising opposition to the pandemic response proved to be a key element in the resuscitation of his political support, ultimately paving the way for his party's victory in the 2023 parliamentary elections.

=== Criminal charges ===
In April 2022, the National Criminal Agency (NAKA) launched "Operation Súmrak (Twilight)", charging opposition leader and former prime minister Robert Fico.

The charges leveled against Fico and his former Interior Minister, Robert Kaliňák, were severe, alleging they had established and led a criminal group while in power, in addition to abuse of authority and improperly handling confidential tax information. Fico said the charges were a "political vendetta" and an act of "fascism".

As a sitting Member of Parliament, Fico was protected by constitutional immunity from detention, necessitating a formal police request to the National Council to waive this privilege. Despite the government's anti-corruption mandate, the parliament's vote in May 2022 failed to gather the requisite 76 votes to waive Fico's parliamentary immunity. Kaliňák, who did not enjoy MP privileges, had already been taken into custody. On 13 May 2022, the Supreme Court of the Slovak Republic ruled to release Kaliňák from pre-trial custody.

The charges against both Fico and Kaliňák were nullified in November 2022 by the General Prosecutor's Office under Article 363 of the Criminal Procedure Code, citing various procedural and legal errors in the original investigation.

=== Attacks against the President ===
Fico's rhetoric against Slovak president Zuzana Čaputová became a defining feature of Slovakia's deeply polarized political landscape, particularly as he sought to return to power. The attacks centered on attempts to delegitimize her mandate and pro-Western stance by consistently labeling her as a "US puppet," an "American agent," or an accomplice of the foreign financier George Soros, entirely without evidence. Fico and his Direction – Social Democracy allies aimed to portray the progressive, liberal president as disloyal to national interests and controlled by external forces.

While Fico himself used slightly less vulgar terms in public addresses, his political environment—including high-profile party members—openly embraced and incited crowds to use far more extreme, misogynistic insults, such as the highly offensive phrase "americká kurva" (American whore) at rallies. The constant and aggressive nature of this verbal abuse, which included death threats directed at Čaputová and her family, significantly contributed to the toxic political atmosphere in Slovakia. Ultimately, Čaputová cited the escalating hatred and threats as a primary reason for her 2023 decision not to seek a second term as president.

=== Russian invasion of Ukraine ===
During the Russian full-scale invasion of Ukraine, Fico's position on the war became increasingly critical of military aid to Ukraine and of Western policy towards Russia. In February 2022, while in opposition, he condemned Russia's recognition of the self-proclaimed Donetsk People's Republic and Luhansk People's Republic, describing the move as a violation of international law.

By 2023, a central part of his campaign platform was the pledge to immediately halt the provision of further military aid from Slovak army stocks to Ukraine, declaring that the country would not send "a single round of ammunition". During the 2023 election campaign, he argued that the war had begun in 2014, when, according to him, "Ukrainian Nazis and fascists started to murder the Russian citizens" in Donbas and Luhansk, echoing Russian propaganda narratives about the conflict. He repeatedly criticized the EU and NATO's strategy, arguing that sanctions against Russia were ineffective and only harmed the Slovak economy.

Fico advocated a negotiated settlement to the war and said that Ukraine would likely have to cede some territory to Russia to achieve peace. He also opposed Ukrainian membership in NATO, arguing that its accession could lead to a wider conflict.

Fico had previously compared the German army to the Nazi-era Wehrmacht when discussing the possibility that German troops would be deployed in Slovakia as part of NATO collective defense. The issue of support for Ukraine became a highly polarising topic in the lead-up to the snap parliamentary election.

== Fourth premiership (2023–present) ==
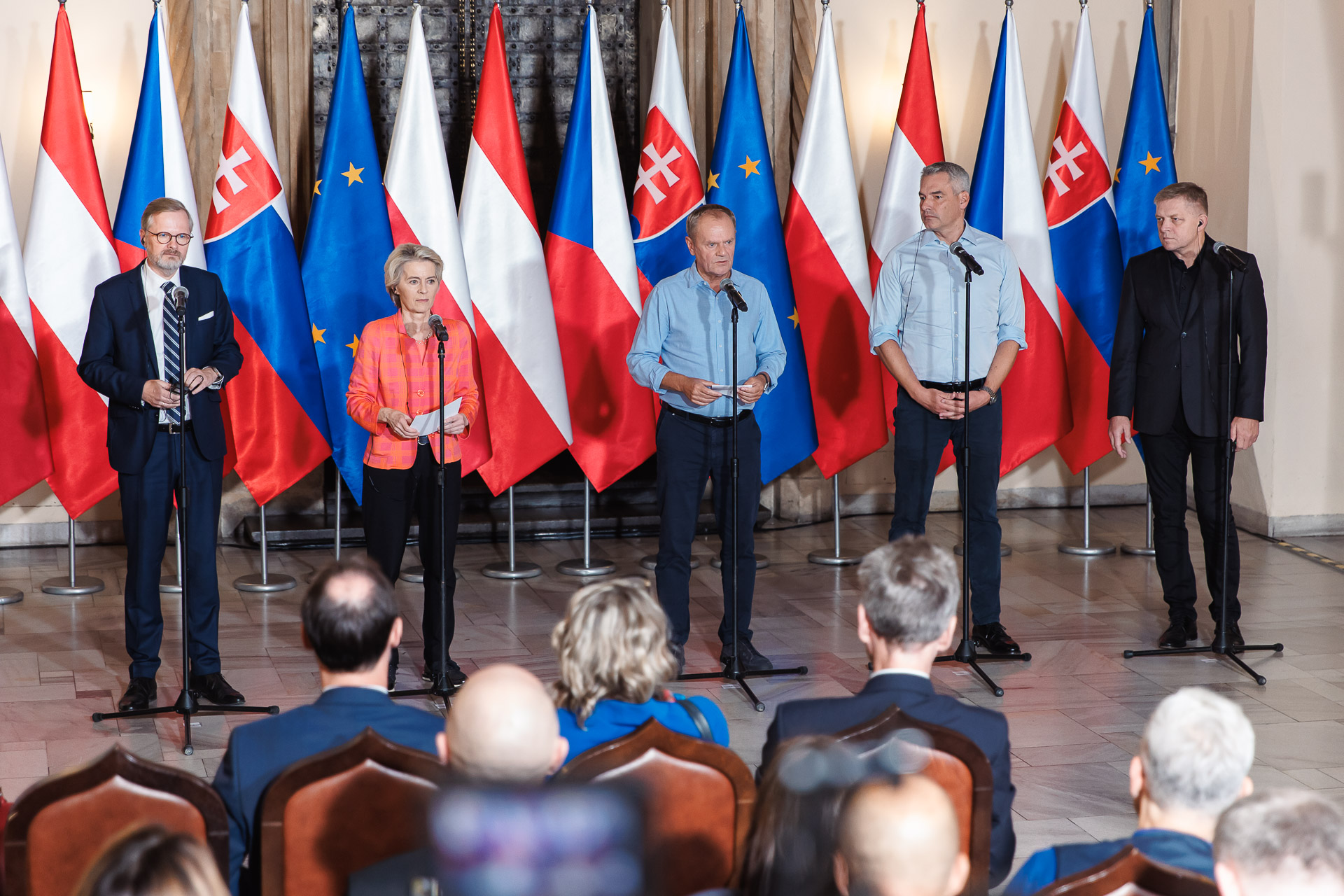
Fico with Petr Fiala, Ursula von der Leyen, Donald Tusk and Karl Nehammer in Wrocław, Poland, 19 September 2024

Following the parliamentary election, Fico's Direction – Social Democracy secured 22.95% of the vote and 42 seats, establishing itself as the largest political party.

Fico then formed a governing coalition by reaching an agreement with the Voice – Social Democracy (Hlas), a party founded in 2020, led by Peter Pellegrini and other dissidents of Fico's Smer, and the nationalist Slovak National Party (SNS), led by Andrej Danko, thereby bringing the SNS back into government after a three-year absence from the National Council of Slovakia. This coalition formalized Fico's return to the premiership, and his Fourth Cabinet was officially sworn into power on 25 October 2023.

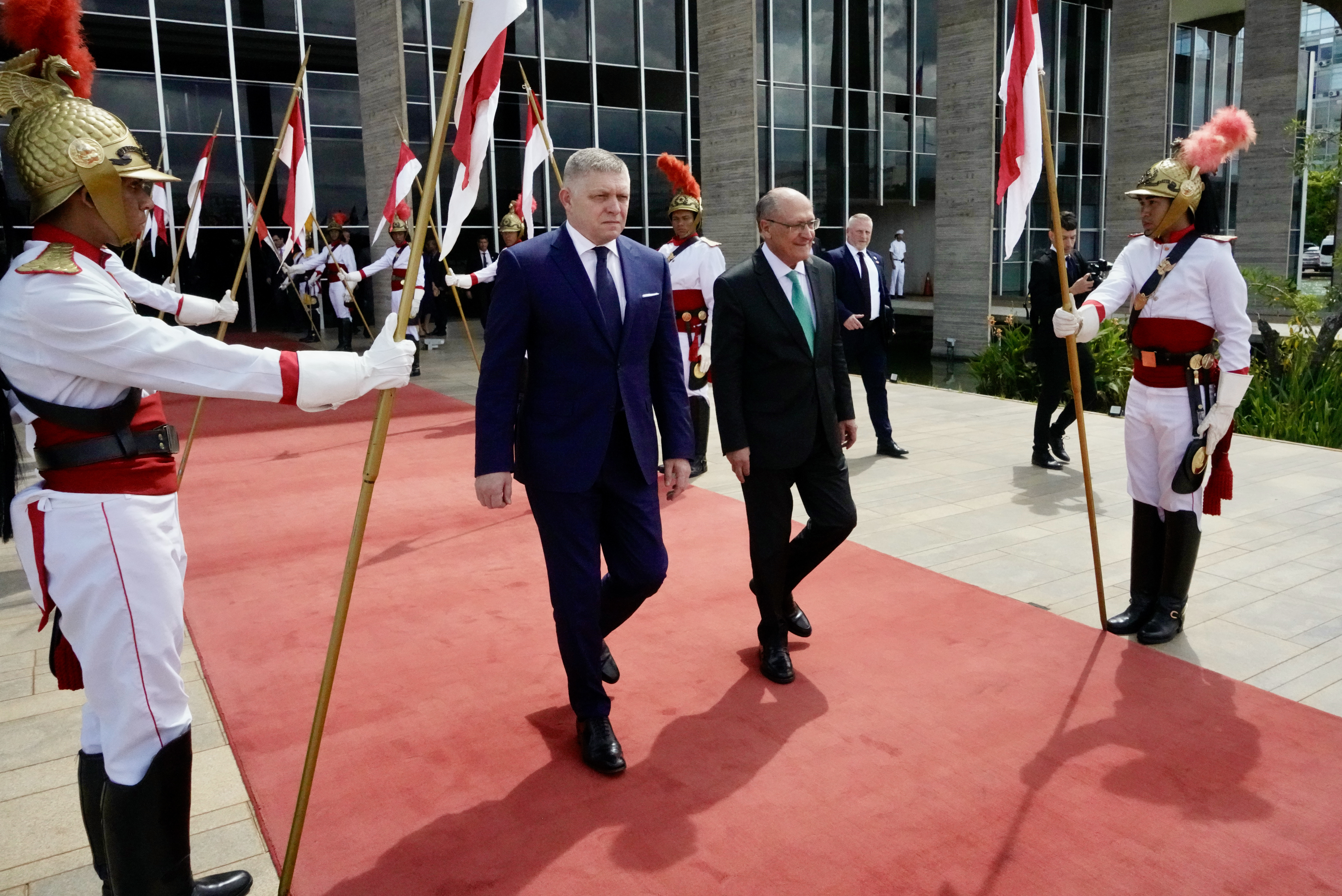
Fico with Vice-President of Brazil Geraldo Alckmin, during official visit of Brazil, December 2024

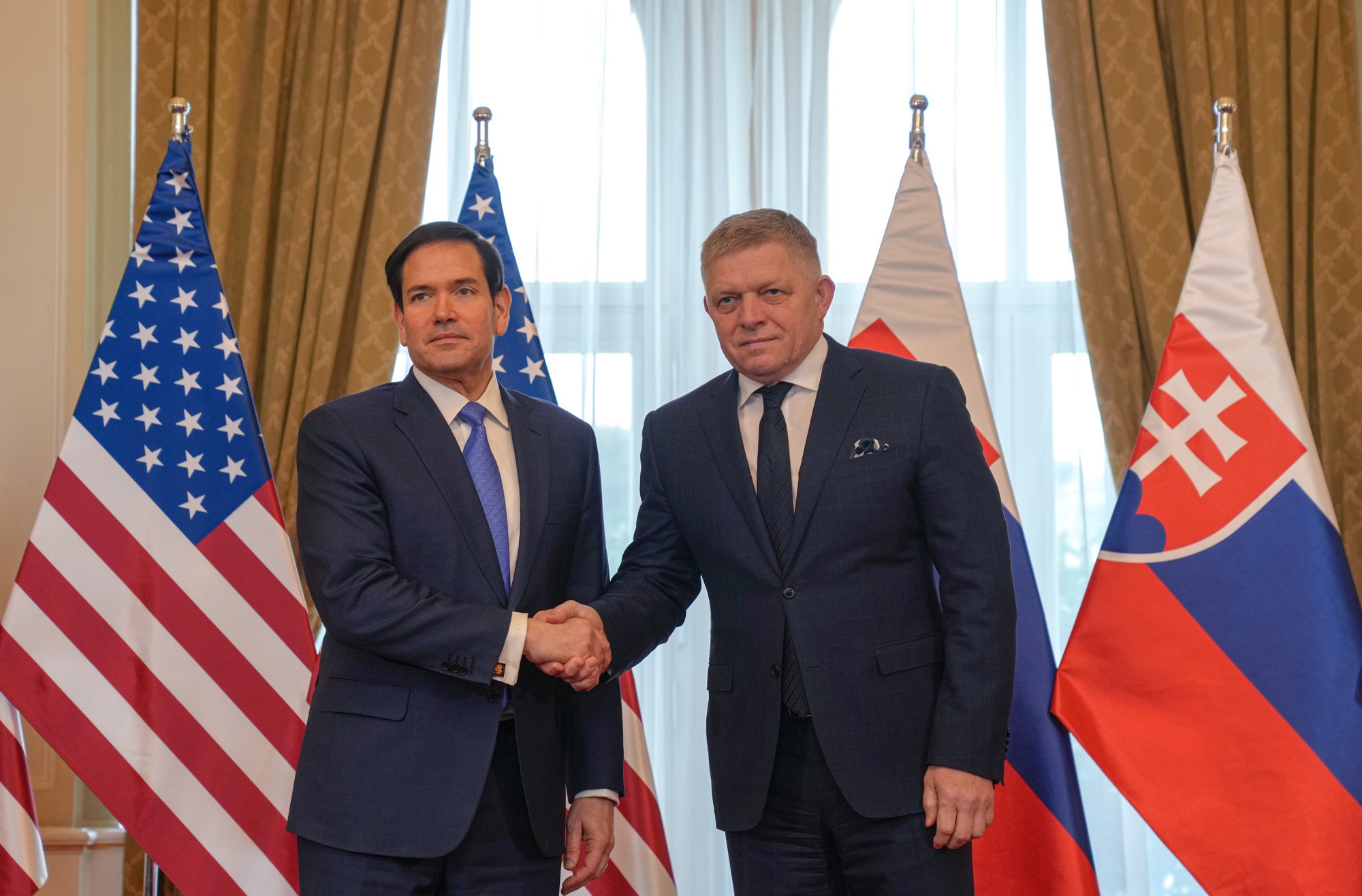
Fico with U.S. Secretary of State Marco Rubio in Bratislava, February 2026

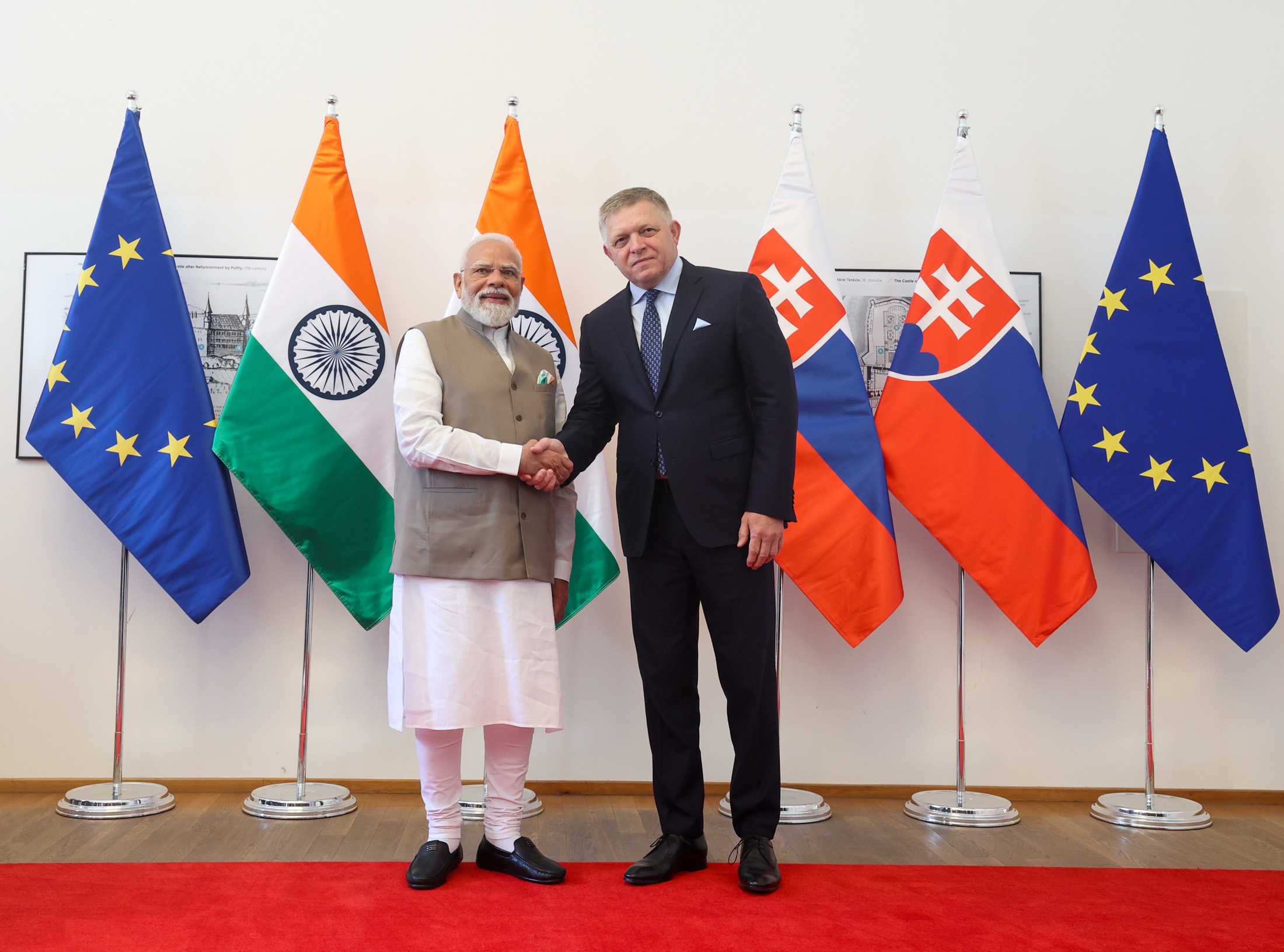
Fico meeting the Prime Minister of India, Narendra Modi, in Bratislava on 15 June 2026

=== Greater control of the media ===
In late 2023, the government began its campaign by publicly labeling several leading independent outlets as "hostile media" and threatened to restrict their access to government offices. The government cut the public broadcaster's budget at the start of 2024. In March 2024, the government's announced a plan to replace the public broadcaster Radio and Television of Slovakia (RTVS). This was condemned as an attack on press freedom and sparked protests. Noel Curran, the European Broadcasting Union (EBU) director general, said in a statement that "This appears to be a thinly veiled attempt to turn the Slovak public service broadcaster into state-controlled media". Critics, including President Zuzana Čaputová, local journalists, the opposition, international media groups, and the European Commission, warned the move gave the government full control of Slovak public television and radio.

In mid-2024 the government passed a law that dissolved RTVS and replaced it with a new entity, Slovak Television and Radio (STVR), controlled by a government-appointed council. The International Press Institute (IPI) said the move allowed the ruling coalition to install its own leadership and exert greater political control over public media content. The Democratic Erosion Consortium said in April 2025 that the replacement of RTVS has drawn international criticism and raised concerns about democratic backsliding and media freedom in the country.

A report by IPI in June 2025, said pressure was applied to most popular private television Markíza, leading to staff changes and fears of editorial self-censorship.

=== Israel–Hamas war ===
Following the 2023 Hamas-led attack on Israel, Fico condemned the attack by Hamas while also stressing that Israel's military response was subject to international and humanitarian law. In December 2023, he criticised what he described as the European Union's "hypocritical" approach to the Gaza war, arguing that the EU had failed to adequately address the civilian death toll and humanitarian situation in Gaza.

=== Judiciary and criminal code reforms ===
Fico's ruling coalition passed a law that shut down the Special Prosecutor's Office, which had dealt with serious corruption. Investigations by the office had led to many high-profile corruption cases and convictions, many of them involving Fico's MPs, party members, and business partners. The changes also include a reduction in punishment for corruption. The ruling coalition fast-tracked the amendments through parliament, limiting the time for debate and preventing the draft law from being reviewed by experts and others usually involved in the process. The changes were opposed by the Slovak president and opposition, and sparked large protests in Slovakia.

In 2024, Fico's coalition passed an Amendment to the Criminal Code. This amendment reduced sentences and statutes of limitations for numerous criminal acts, among them bribery, tax fraud, fraud, embezzlement and robbery. This reform stopped the prosecution of some corruption cases involving politicians and businessmen, some of whom were close to Fico. Among them were: former minister of finance Ján Počiatek; Oligarch Jozef Výboh, suspected of taking a bribe of 150,000 €, intended for Peter Pellegrini; and acting speaker of the National Council Peter Žiga, suspected of an attempt to bribe a Supreme Court judge with 100,000 €.

=== Assassination attempt ===
On 15 May 2024, around 14:30 (2:30 PM), Fico was injured in a shooting in Handlová, Slovakia, in front of the city's House of Culture after a government meeting, and was subsequently hospitalized at the F.D. Roosevelt Hospital in Banská Bystrica. A 71-year-old poet named Juraj Cintula was immediately detained by police as a primary suspect. Fico was reportedly in a "life-threatening" condition following the attack, having suffered wounds to his stomach, arms, and legs, but was stabilized following emergency surgery, and was expected to recover according to deputy prime minister Tomáš Taraba. Cintula stated that he was motivated by what he perceived as Fico's anti-EU stance and by the wish for Slovakia to provide "military assistance" to Ukraine.

On 30 May, Fico was discharged from the hospital and was allowed to continue his recovery at home.

On 5 June 2024, Fico made his first comments on the attack, saying that he forgave the attacker as he is only the "messenger of evil" of the opposition. Fico asked the "anti-government media", especially those linked to George Soros, foreign-funded NGO's and the opposition, not to downplay the reasons for the attack. He described his attacker as a "messenger of the evil and political hatred" created by the "unsuccessful and frustrated" opposition. He added that he expected to return to work later that month or in July.

Senior politicians from Fico's ruling coalition blamed independent media and the opposition for the assassination attempt, alleging that they influenced the shooter. Slovak journalists and opposition leaders feared that the government would use the assassination attempt to crack down on them. The shooting was unanimously condemned by the National Council.

On 21 October 2025, Cintula was convicted and sentenced to 21 years' imprisonment by the Specialised Criminal Court in Banská Bystrica.

=== Protests ===
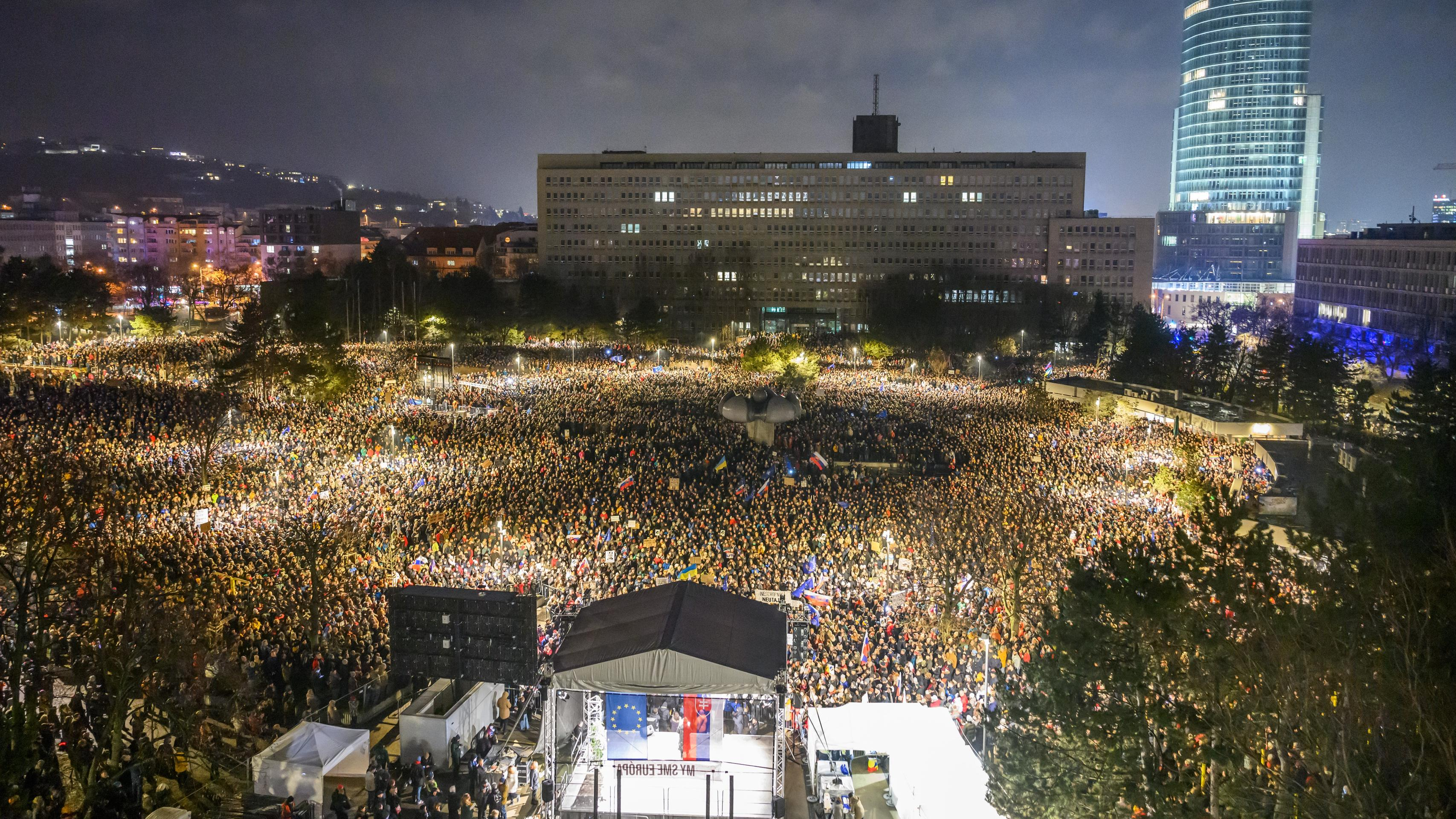
About 60,000 Slovaks gathered in the central square of Bratislava, to protest against the pro-Russian policy of Robert Fico, January 2025

Fico traveled to Russia on 22 December 2024 to meet with Vladimir Putin to discuss primarily the transfer of Russian gas to Slovakia, becoming the third Western leader to do so since the war started. The meeting violated the terms of the EU's Common Security and Defence Policy.

Due to Fico's continued vocal support for Russia and opposition to Ukraine, tens of thousands of people protested throughout Slovakia. Fico had protested Ukraine closing the brotherhood pipeline and attempted to pressure the Ukrainian government into continuing the transit of Russian gas to Slovakia, by stating he would block energy supply to Ukraine. In response the Polish government announced that they would allow the transit of emergency natural gas instead.

During the January protests, Fico's coalition partners, the SNS, withdrew from his governing coalition, opening the possibility for a vote of no confidence to oust Fico. Fico said the protest organisers and the opposition were colluding with a group of foreigners to bring about a coup in Slovakia. He said the group would occupy government buildings, block roads, organise a nationwide strike, and provoke clashes with police forces as part of their plan. In support of the accusation, he presented to parliament a secret report from Slovakia's security service.

=== Slovak–Ukraine gas dispute (2025) ===
The Slovak–Ukraine gas dispute began on 1 January 2025, when Ukraine did not renew the transit contract with Russia's Gazprom, halting the primary flow of Russian natural gas to Central European nations, including Slovakia. Fico vehemently criticized Ukraine's "unilateral decision," arguing that it caused significant economic harm to Slovakia, which stood to lose an estimated €500 million annually in transit fees.

Fico said he was "fed up with" Ukrainian President Volodymyr Zelenskyy, whom he accused of "roaming Europe begging and blackmailing others, asking for money." Fico tied his statement to the Slovak-Ukraine gas dispute, and described Ukraine as an unreliable partner.

In direct response, Fico's government threatened to retaliate by cutting electricity supplies and reducing support for Ukrainian refugees. Ukraine, in turn, accused Fico of prioritizing Moscow's interests and offered to help secure alternative, non-Russian energy supplies for Slovakia. However, by 1 February, Slovakia's state gas supplier began receiving Russian gas via a new southern route—the TurkStream pipeline through Turkey and Hungary—partially mitigating the immediate supply crisis, though at higher prices and with reduced volumes, forcing Slovakia to seek further diversification.

=== Open letter from psychiatrists ===
In January 2025, over 150 Slovak psychiatrists and psychologists signed an open letter to Fico, expressing profound concern about the country's political direction and the state of society. The letter, penned by professors Jozef Hašto and Anton Heretik, accused Fico of being authoritarian, manipulating facts, and "aggressive and emotionally explosive" public speeches, which they suggested worsened after the May 2024 assassination attempt.

The professionals wrote that Fico was fostering a negative atmosphere and polarising the public. Fico said the psychiatrists had "long been public opponents of [his] government" and described the appeal as "a disgraceful abuse of your titles for political purposes".

=== Croatian property ===
In March 2025, Croatian media alleged Fico had purchased land in the coastal village of Ražanj and was planning to build a summer house there. Fico dismissed the allegation and said he would readily admit the claim if it were true since "hundreds of Slovak politicians, whether at the national, regional, or local level, own property there".

In July, The Slovak Spectator wrote that a luxury two-story villa in Croatia, with a pool, sea view and reportedly valued over one million euros, was linked to Fico. The property is not registered under Fico's name in the Croatian land registry. The property was initially registered to two young Slovak businessmen, Matej Gocník and Matúš Moravčík, both with tangential ties to Fico's political circle. Opposition leader and former Slovak prime minister Igor Matovič alleged that these individuals were "front men" for Fico and that Fico stayed there in 2024. In March, Slovak media had reported that Fico had telephoned the "real owner" to apologise for the "media circus" and to arrange a rental of the villa for his summer holiday. Local authorities reportedly confirmed that the property was not registered for legal rental.

=== Election meddling accusation ===
In July 2025, Fico accused the United Kingdom of "deliberate, intentional" interference in the 2023 Slovak parliamentary election. Fico alleged that the UK's Foreign Office, through a London-based media agency, secretly funded a campaign to pay influencers and activists. He said the campaign aimed to sway young voters in favour of the liberal opposition party, Progressive Slovakia (PS), and undermine his own party, Direction – Social Democracy.

The allegations, stemming from an investigative report, resulted in the Slovak Foreign Ministry summoning the British Ambassador for an explanation. The UK government rejected the accusation, stating its activity was non-partisan and intended to encourage democratic participation among young people.

Following the initial accusations in July 2025, the Slovak police launched an investigation into potential foreign interference based on a report by Declassified UK and the Prime Minister’s claims. In April 2026, the police rejected the case and halted the investigation.

=== Constitutional amendments ===
In September 2025, the Slovak government successfully passed a constitutional amendment that cemented a number of deeply conservative social policies. This amendment strictly recognized only male and female as genders, limited adoption exclusively to married heterosexual couples, and introduced a nationwide ban on surrogacy. Furthermore, it mandated that school curricula must comply with the constitutional ethics, reinforcing the existing 2014 amendment defining marriage solely between a man and a woman. Crucially, the amendment declared that Slovak laws concerning cultural and ethical issues would override conflicting European Union laws. The governing party, Direction – Social Democracy, celebrated the measure as "a dam against progressivism" necessary to preserve the nation's "traditions and spiritual heritage".

Prior to the vote, the Council of Europe's Venice Commission issued a warning, expressing concern that the clauses asserting the primacy of Slovak law on "cultural and ethical issues" must not be used to violate the country's international obligations under EU law and the European Convention on Human Rights, and also recommended removing the strict binary gender wording to prevent future discrimination.

Following the reform's passage, the European Commission officially launched an infringement proceeding against Slovakia in November 2025 over the constitutional amendments' conflict with EU law. Fico stated, "We look forward to this conflict".

=== Expulsion from European Socialists ===
The Party of European Socialists expelled Robert Fico’s Direction – Social Democracy in 2025

The Party of European Socialists (PES) officially expelled Fico's party, Direction – Social Democracy, at its congress in October 2025 in Amsterdam. The decision, which was unanimous, followed the party's suspension in October 2023 for forming a government coalition with the far-right Slovak National Party and for a "clear divergence from the values of the PES family". PES did not give specific reasons for the expulsion but said the party had taken positions that contradict "severely and deeply the values and principles our family stands for".

Fico responded to the expulsion with defiance, taking to social media to state he was "proud of this exclusion" if it was due to his party's defense of the constitutional definition of marriage, which in Slovakia enshrines the union as exclusively between a man and a woman, or his participation in the celebration of victory over fascism in Russia and China. He said the PES' action demonstrated intolerance toward his government's social conservatism, and he also stated that "The Party of European Socialists should be renamed the Party of European Homosexuals and Warmongers".

=== Opposition to sanctions on Russia ===
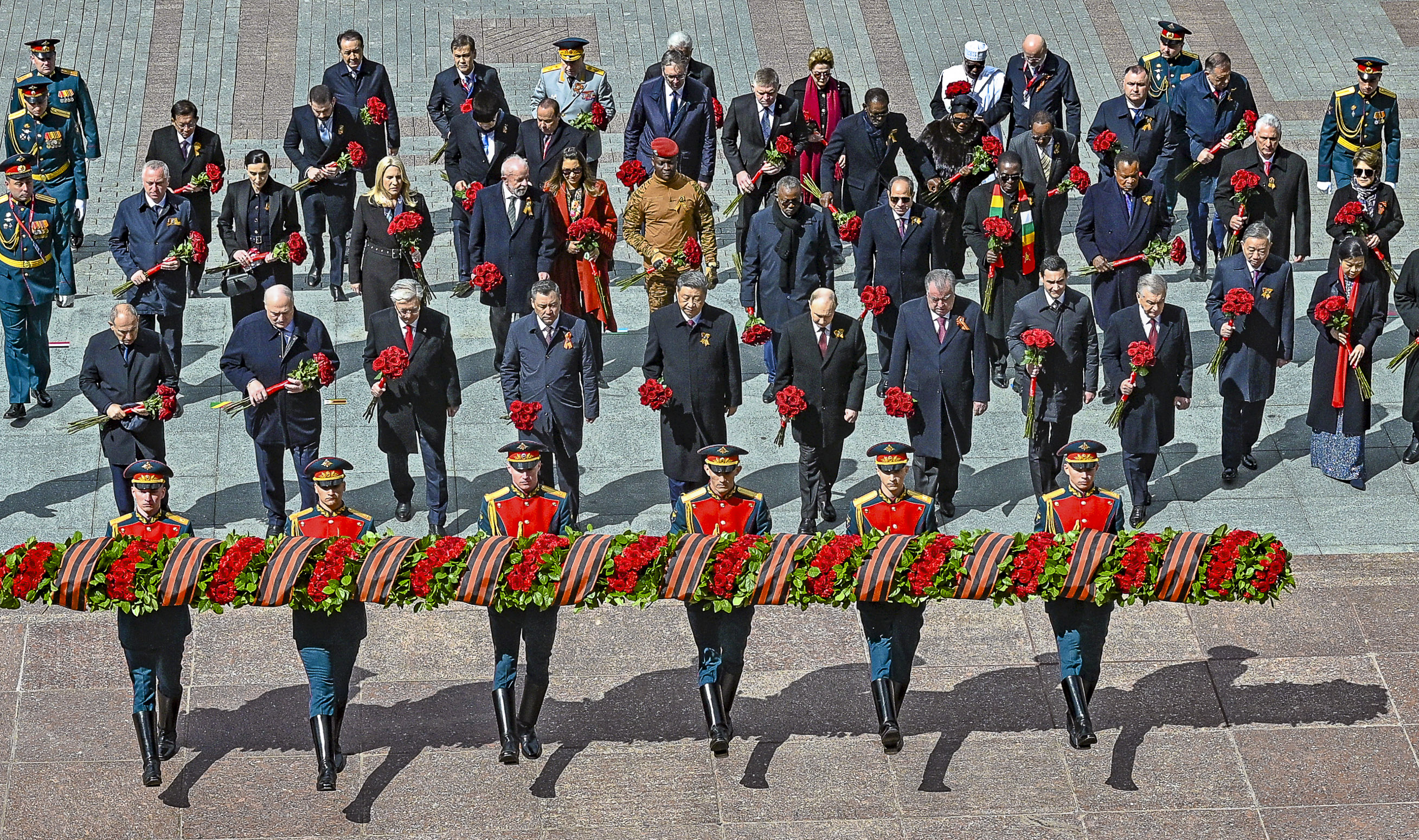
Fico (in the middle of the last row) was the only leader of an EU member state to attend the Russian Victory Day parade in Moscow, Russia, 9 May 2025

Fico opposes sanctions on Russia and has described the EU's policy of ending Russian energy imports as "imbecilic". Slovakia depends heavily on the import of Russian energy and has asked for an exemption from the EU's Russian import policy and requested that Slovakia keep its current contract with Russian gas company Gazprom until it expires in 2034. He said he would not support sanctions against Russia which would hurt Slovakia. The adoption of the 18th package of sanctions was delayed six times until Fico withdrew his opposition in July 2025, after securing written assurances and guarantees from the European Commission regarding energy prices and supply security.

In October 2025, Fico invoked his veto power again to block the 19th package of sanctions, which targets Russian LNG, oil infrastructure, and frozen assets—demanding that EU leaders first provide concrete instructions to address the crisis in the automotive industry and high energy costs. Fico's strategy of linking support for sanctions to domestic economic concerns has positioned Slovakia, alongside Hungary, as an obstacle to European unity on policy towards Russia. He subsequently lifted the blockade after his demands were addressed, allowing the package to be adopted.

In a speech delivered in the National Council of Slovakia, Fico dismissed the objective to "bring Russia to its knees," and stated that the world knows "Russians only get on their knees to tie their shoelaces".

In November 2025, Fico stated that Slovakia will not support the European Union's plan to use frozen Russian assets to finance military costs in Ukraine. Fico called the EU initiative controversial, warning that seizing the assets for military aid would only prolong the war, and argued that the focus should be on a peace plan. He emphasized that Slovakia would not participate in any legal or financial schemes directed at using the frozen funds for Ukrainian military spending and stated, "This piece of Russian cheese smells extremely tempting to the European raven".

In February 2026, Slovakia joined Hungary in blocking the European Union’s 20th sanctions package against Russia, preventing its adoption ahead of the fourth anniversary of the invasion of Ukraine. The opposition was primarily tied to a dispute over the Druzhba oil pipeline, which has seen halted deliveries since late January. Ukraine said the halt was due to Russian strikes on Ukrainian infrastructure. Slovakia said Ukraine was keeping the pipeline closed to pressure Slovakia and Hungary to accept Ukraine's admission to the EU. Bratislava and Budapest have accused Kyiv of intentionally delaying repairs to the pipeline, effectively using their veto as leverage to restore oil transit. In April 2026, after oil flows through the pipeline resumed, Slovakia and Hungary dropped their opposition and the EU adopted the 20th package.

Fico said the sanctions against Russia were "self-destructive" for the Slovak economy and would not stop the conflict. He said that the EU's focus is misplaced, stating, "Just as we devised 20 sanctions packages, we should have devised 20 peace initiatives".

=== Chalk November Wave ===
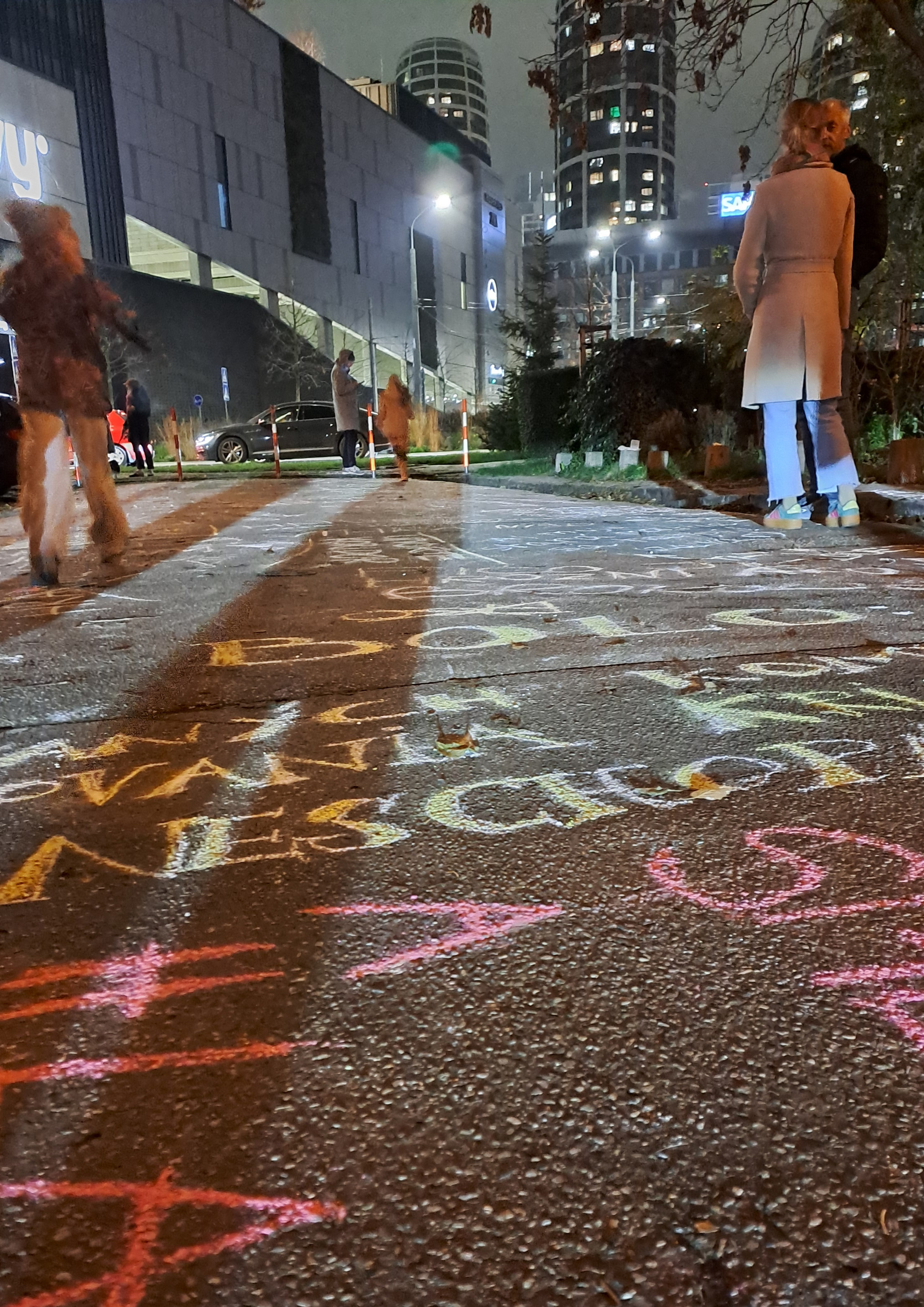
Chalk protest signs in Bratislava

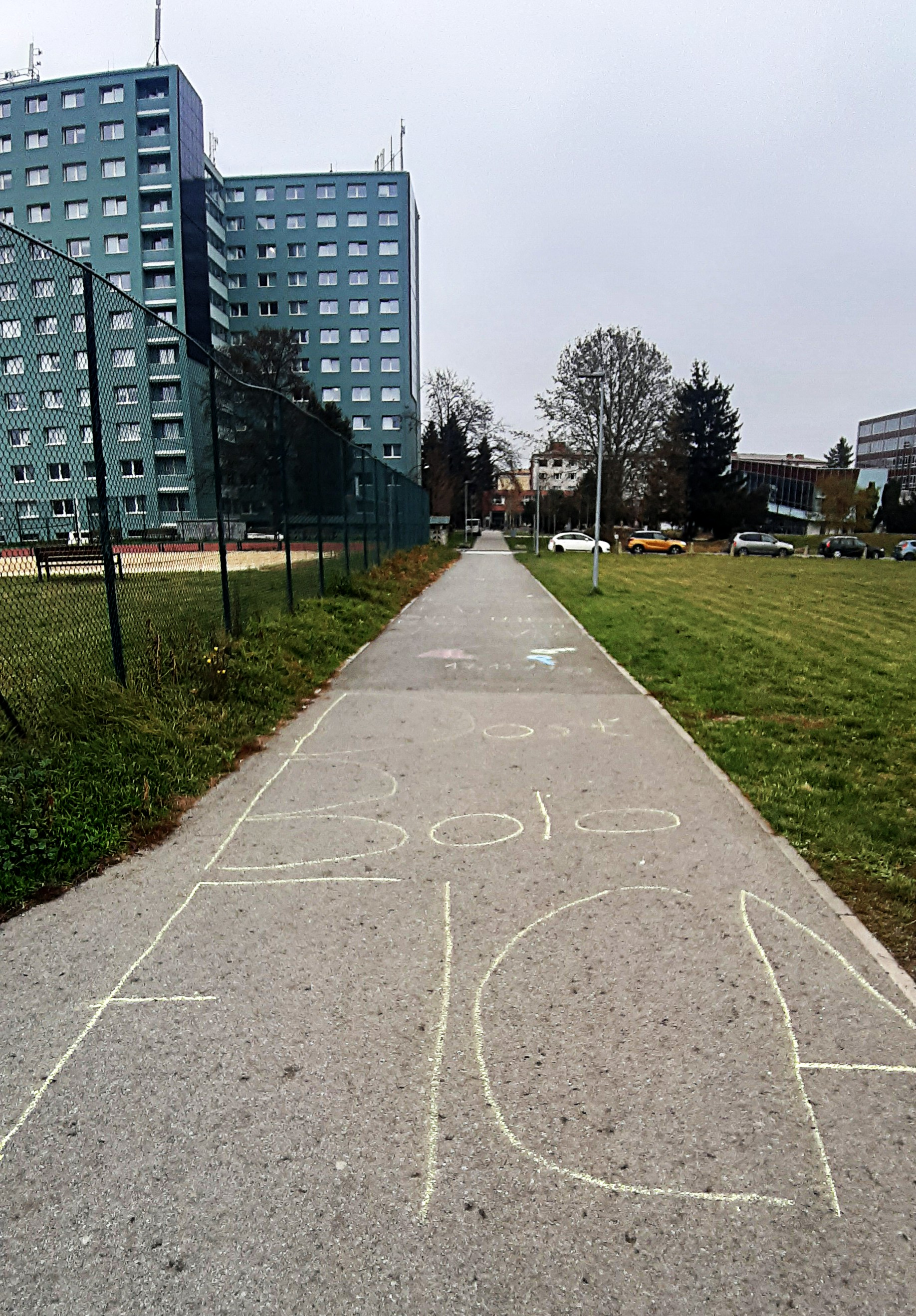
One of the chalk protest signs in Prešov that says "Enough of Fico"

The "Chalk November Wave (Kriedová novembrová vlna)", also called the "Chalk Revolution (Kriedová revolúcia)", was a grassroots protest movement that swept across Slovakia in November 2025. It began after a 19-year-old student, nicknamed "Muro", was taken from his classroom by police for questioning after he used chalk to write anti-government slogans outside his school in Poprad on 7 November 2025. The incident occurred shortly before a scheduled official visit by Fico to the school. The student was released without charge in the same day.

A few days later, during a talk at another high school in Poprad, Fico said the European Union plans to spend €140 billion "to prolong the war" in Ukraine, resulting in a backlash from the students. In response, Fico said "If you're such heroes, go and fight in Ukraine".

In a display of solidarity with students, thousands of chalk signs and messages, ranging from "Enough of Fico" to pro-European and pro-Ukraine symbols, appeared on sidewalks, squares, and in front of government buildings in dozens of cities across Slovakia.

The protests reached their peak on 17 November 2025, when tens of thousands of people gathered in Bratislava and other cities to mark the anniversary of the Velvet Revolution and to demand Fico's resignation. The rallies were organised by opposition parties and civic group. "Muro" and opposition leaders spoke at the rally in Bratislava. However, due to deteriorating weather conditions, the "Chalk November Wave" concluded shortly thereafter, as the outdoor elements, specifically rain and snow, made continued chalk-based demonstrations impractical.

=== Epstein files ===
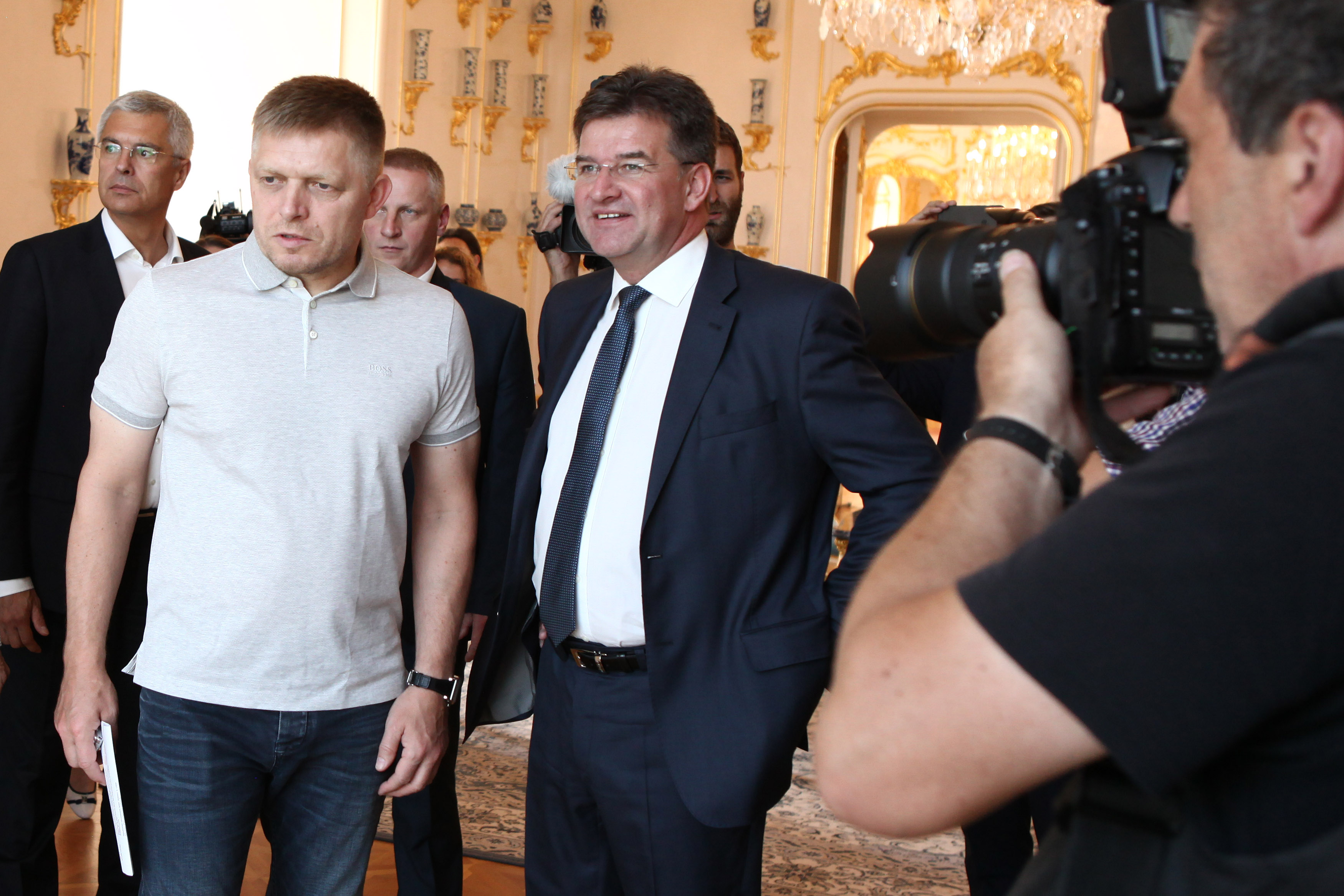
Robert Fico and Miroslav Lajčák at the Bratislava Summit during Slovakia's EU presidency, September 2016

In late 2025 and early 2026, the release of over three million pages of documents related to convicted child sex offender Jeffrey Epstein, known as the "Epstein files" by the U.S. Department of Justice, sparked political controversy in Slovakia. The documents revealed that Miroslav Lajčák, a high-profile Slovak diplomat and advisor to Fico for foreign affairs and national security, had extensive email communication with Epstein between 2017 and 2019. During the period of correspondence, Lajčák simultaneously served as Minister of Foreign and European Affairs of Slovakia in Fico's Third Cabinet and President of the United Nations General Assembly.

In the correspondence released in November 2025, Epstein referred to Lajčák as "Miro" and discussed his potential advancement to top roles in the UN or NATO. In a 15 March 2018, email to Steve Bannon, Epstein said Lajčák was the person who would lead a "European project" and predicted the fall of the Slovak government "as planned", an event that occurred days later following the murder of Ján Kuciak. Lajčák said he only had social contact with Epstein as part as part his diplomatic duties.

Opposition parties and Fico's coalition partner, the Slovak National Party called on Fico to dismiss Lajčák. Fico characterized Lajčák as an "excellent diplomat" and stated he would not "execute" a colleague based on social meetings without evidence of moral or legal failure.

A photograph released in December 2025, showed Lajčák and Epstein together at the Slovak diplomatic residence in Vienna.

In January 2026, the new records allegedly show Lajčák asking Jeffrey Epstein to introduce him to "young girls" and boasting that Epstein had not yet seen him "in action". In these exchanges, Lajčák reportedly requested an invitation to participate in Epstein’s private "games".

According to the publicized records, Lajčák suggested a meeting between Fico and American far-right strategist Steve Bannon. Epstein wanted to establish a network of far-right political groups with Bannon in Europe and Lajčák said Fico could "play Steve’s game".

On 31 January 2026, following a joint statement from opposition politicians calling for his departure and mounting pressure from the media, Lajčák submitted his resignation. Fico accepted the resignation, marking the end of Lajčák's tenure as a key advisor. Fico described Lajčák as a victim of media pressure and said the country had lost a source of experience in diplomacy and foreign policy.

In February 2026, Fico said that he had never met Steve Bannon.

=== Slovak–Ukraine oil dispute ===
In February 2026, Fico faced a major foreign policy crisis during the 2026 Slovak–Ukraine oil dispute, sparked by the cessation of Russian crude oil transit through the Druzhba pipeline. Kyiv said technical damage from Russian drone strikes was the cause. Fico, speaking several weeks after the initial disruption, dismissed these claims as a "purely political decision" and a "hostile act" intended to "blackmail" Slovakia. Citing Slovak intelligence sources, he said that the pipeline infrastructure was already functional and that Ukraine was deliberately stalling the restart to pressure Hungary to drop its opposition to Ukraine joining the EU. He warned of severe retaliatory measures if flows were not restored.

Under his direction, the Slovak government declared a state of emergency, released strategic oil reserves, and suspended diesel fuel exports to Ukraine.

On 23 February, Fico conducted a high-profile visit to the headquarters of Slovenská elektrizačná prenosová sústava (SEPS) accompanied by Finance Minister Ladislav Kamenický. During this meeting, Fico formally requested the immediate termination of emergency electricity assistance to Ukraine.

On 26 March, Branislav Gröhling, chairman of the opposition party Freedom and Solidarity (SaS), announced that the Slovak police had launched an investigation into Prime Minister Robert Fico for treason. The police said they are examining the complaint to see whether the facts it describes constitute a criminal offence. The investigation began after Gröhling filed a criminal complaint on 24 February 2026. Gröhling said nearly 13,000 citizens signed it and described it as the largest criminal complaint in Slovak history. The allegations center on Fico’s decision to stop emergency electricity and diesel supplies to Ukraine, a move the opposition claims undermines Slovakia's security and state interests.

Slovakia began receiving crude oil through the Druzhba pipeline again on 23 April 2026.

=== Fico's son's finances ===
Robert Fico's son Michal Fico purchased two luxury apartments in Bratislava’s Old Town district, one purchased in 2022 and another in 2025, both acquired without mortgage financing. Estimations suggest the market value of these properties could reach up to €800,000, leading to questions from the website standard.sk regarding how he could acquire the properties without bank loans and how these purchases align with his reported professional income.

The financial affairs of Michal became a focus of political and media scrutiny in 2026. Reports in June 2026 said that Michal Fico received approximately €100,000 in pay over roughly two years for his work as the sole executive of the party-linked "Agentúra Smer" (Direction – Social Democracy Agency). Opposition party Progressive Slovakia (PS) alleged that these payments represent an indirect transfer of public funds to the Prime Minister’s family. Smer received about 23 million euros from the state after the 2023 elections. Agentúra Smer provides services to Smer, and has been paid 3.6 million euros by Smer since 2024. Robert Fico said that the agency is a private entity and that its payments are lawful. Opposition leader Michal Šimečka said there was a perceived conflict of interest. When opposition parliamentarian Zuzana Števulová asked Fico whether he would resign because of the reports, Fico dismissed the inquiry, stating, "I have never seen a stupider question". Regarding the legitimacy of the payments, Robert Fico said that "everything is as clear as God's eye".

== Ideological views ==
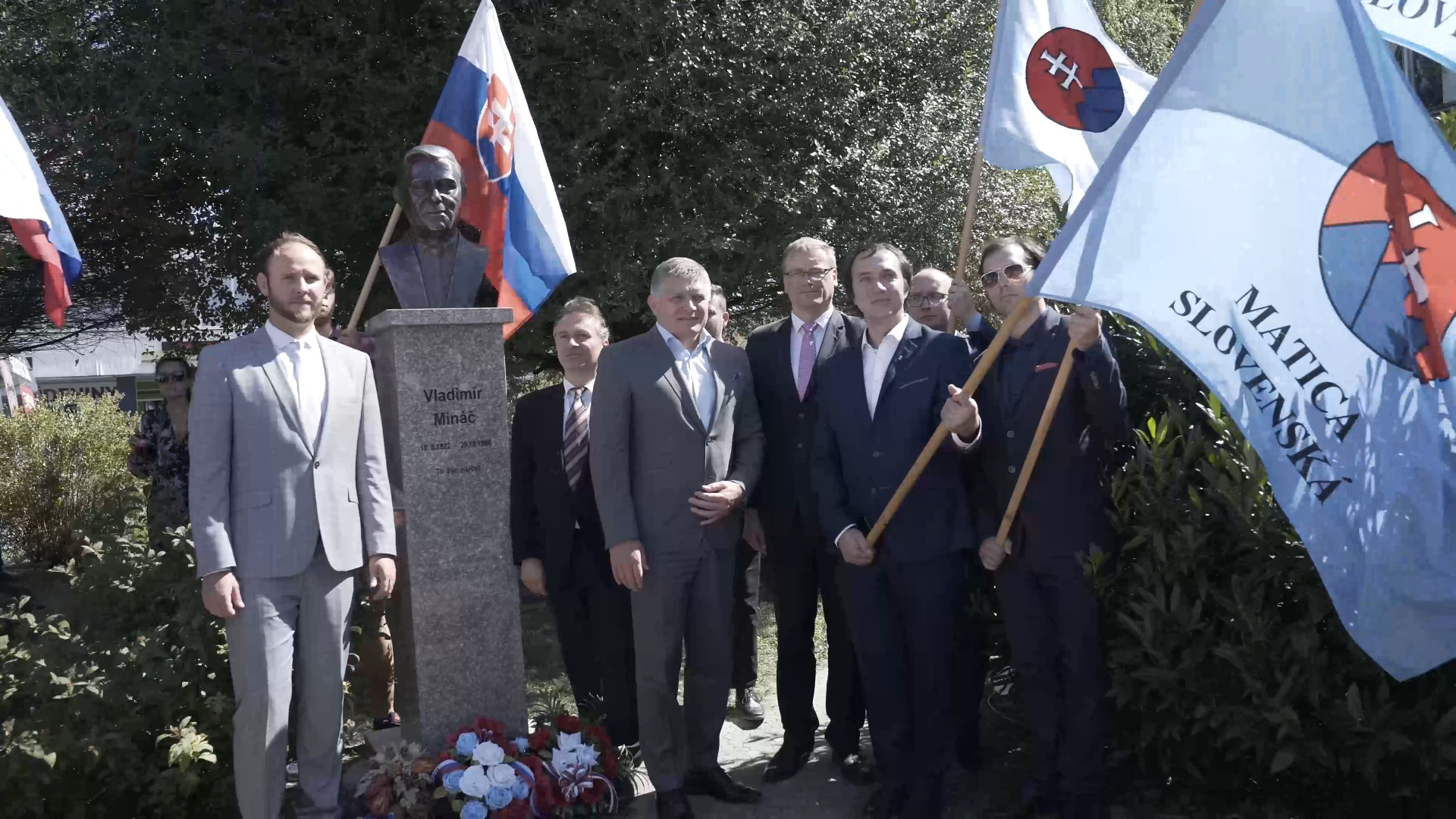
Fico at the Slovak Matica event - the unveiling of the bust of the writer and left-wing intellectual Vladimír Mináč, August 2022

Fico's ideological views are generally described as populist, combining elements of left-wing nationalism and social conservatism within his Direction – Social Democracy party. While his party identifies as social-democratic, Fico has been noted for his use of anti-establishment rhetoric, often criticizing elites, the media, and non-governmental organizations.

Fico has stated that Western liberal democracy has "completely collapsed" and is "terribly ineffective". He praised the governance models of one-party states China and Vietnam for their economic effectiveness and stability which he contrasted with Slovakia's system under which "Every four years, a new government scraps everything and starts over".

Economically, his party champions a leftist platform, advocating for strong social welfare spending and state intervention to support the working class, often by reversing market-oriented and austerity reforms implemented by previous governments.

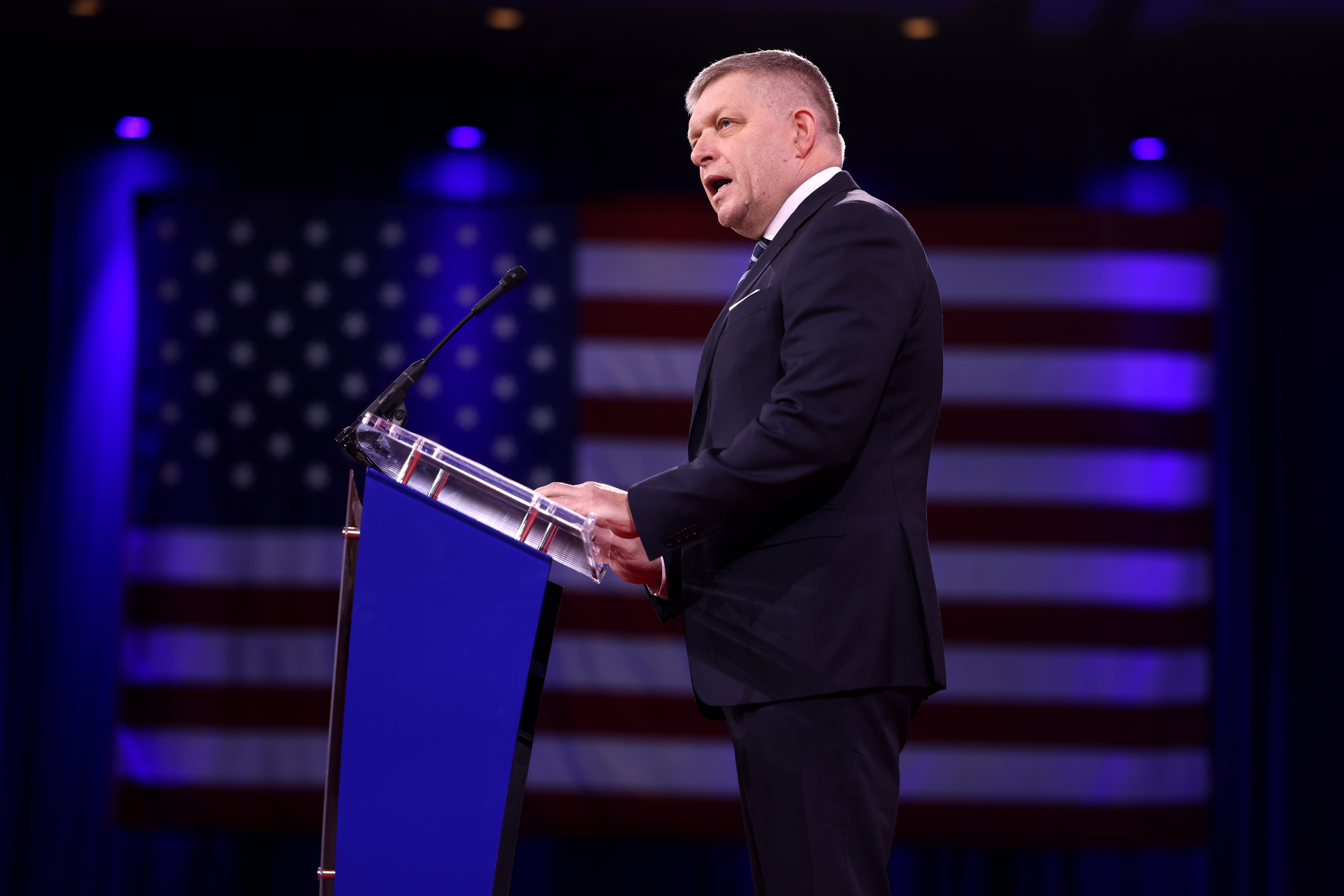
Fico speaking at the Conservative Political Action Conference in National Harbor, Maryland, U.S., February 2025

Fico adheres to deeply socially conservative positions, opposing LGBTQ+ rights and same-sex adoption while promoting policies that emphasize national pride and traditional Christian values.

In foreign policy, he pursues the concept of the "politics of the four corners of the world," which advocates for an autonomous, sovereign approach that balances Slovakia's EU/NATO membership with intensified relations with non-EU partners, including the BRICS bloc. In line with this doctrine he holds pro-Russian views, valuing a friendly relationship with Russia and often sympathising with Russia's geopolitical interests, marking a significant departure from Slovakia's long-standing Western ties. In 2026, Fico questioned the commitment of NATO members to collective defense under Article 5, stating, "Why would French soldiers go die for Slovaks?" and said that Slovak 2003 referendum on joining the EU would have failed without cheating. Speaking about Slovakia's entry into the EU, Fico stated: "When Slovakia joined the EU in 2004, people were very excited. But we had a referendum that would not have passed if it wasn't manipulated".

Fico initially defined Direction – Social Democracy as the "third way" party, which recognised the role of the market and business as well as the role of government and a strong state. His ideology has undergone transformations over his long career, consistently prioritizing his domestic political goals and emphasizing Slovak national interests. Fico is critical of the Western model of the left, which he calls "the Brussels left".

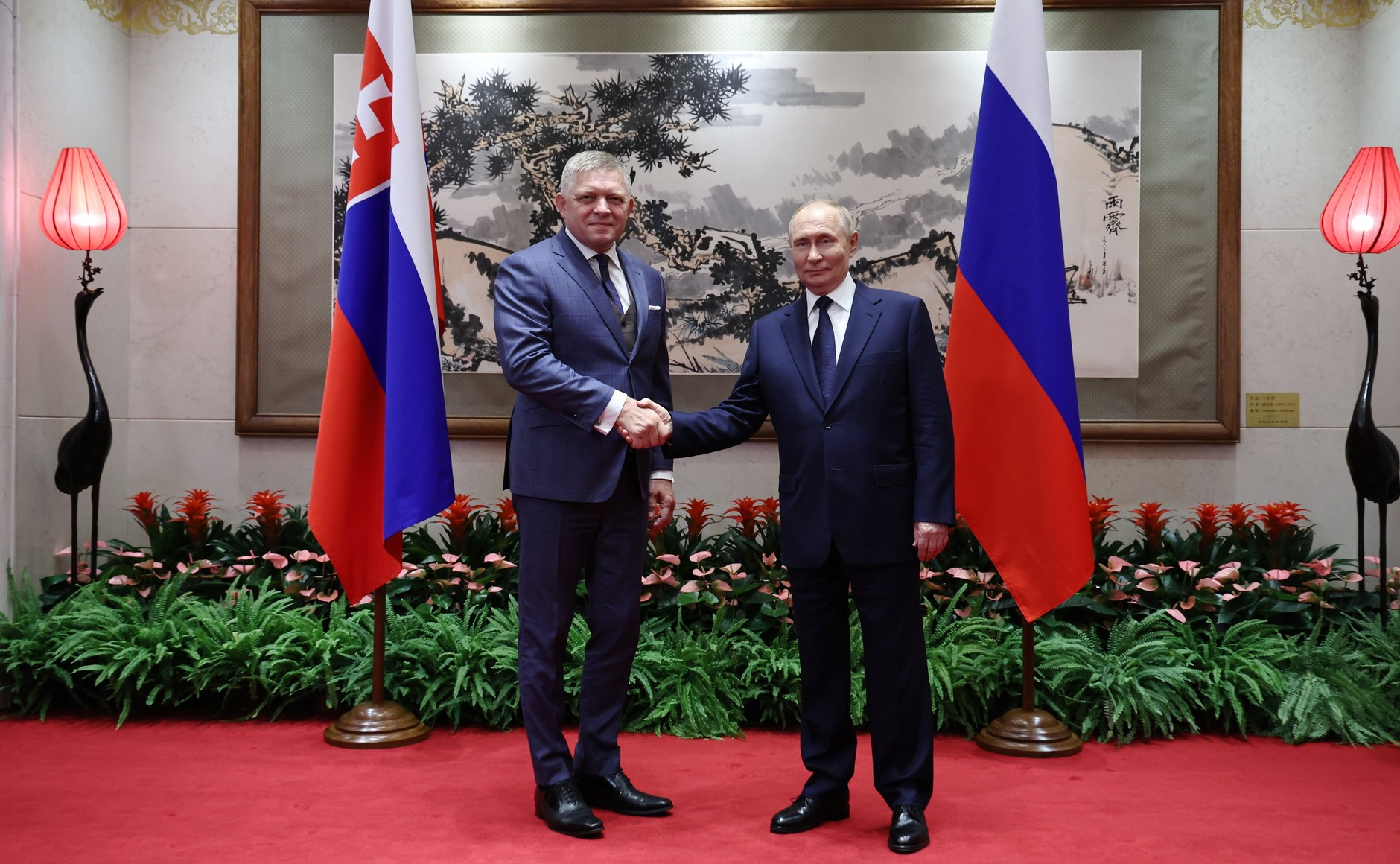
Fico meeting Russian president Vladimir Putin in Beijing, China, 2 September 2025

Fico selectively praises a diverse range of historical Slovak figures to build a broad political narrative rooted in national identity and socialist history. He hailed Ľudovít Štúr, a key figure in the Slovak national revival, stressing that Štúr was guided by the motto that "the most beautiful words are deeds". He expressed respect for Gustáv Husák, the last Communist president of Czechoslovakia, stating Husák "prevented repressions in the normalisation 70s" and deserves "respect and humility". He also invokes Alexander Dubček of the Prague Spring, stating that his own political party is dedicated to providing a "human face to modern society", following Dubček's vision of a "socialism with a human face". Fico also honors Milan Rastislav Štefánik, a co-founder of Czechoslovakia, by calling him a "lasting symbol of inspiration and national pride". He honored Vladimír Clementis, a Communist diplomat and victim of Stalinist purges, by stating his praise and later unveiling a sculpture of him at the Ministry of Foreign Affairs in 2007. Fico has also embraced the legacy of the influential writer and intellectual Vladimír Mináč, attending the unveiling of his bust in 2022 and emphasizing that he represents qualities absent in modern Slovakia.

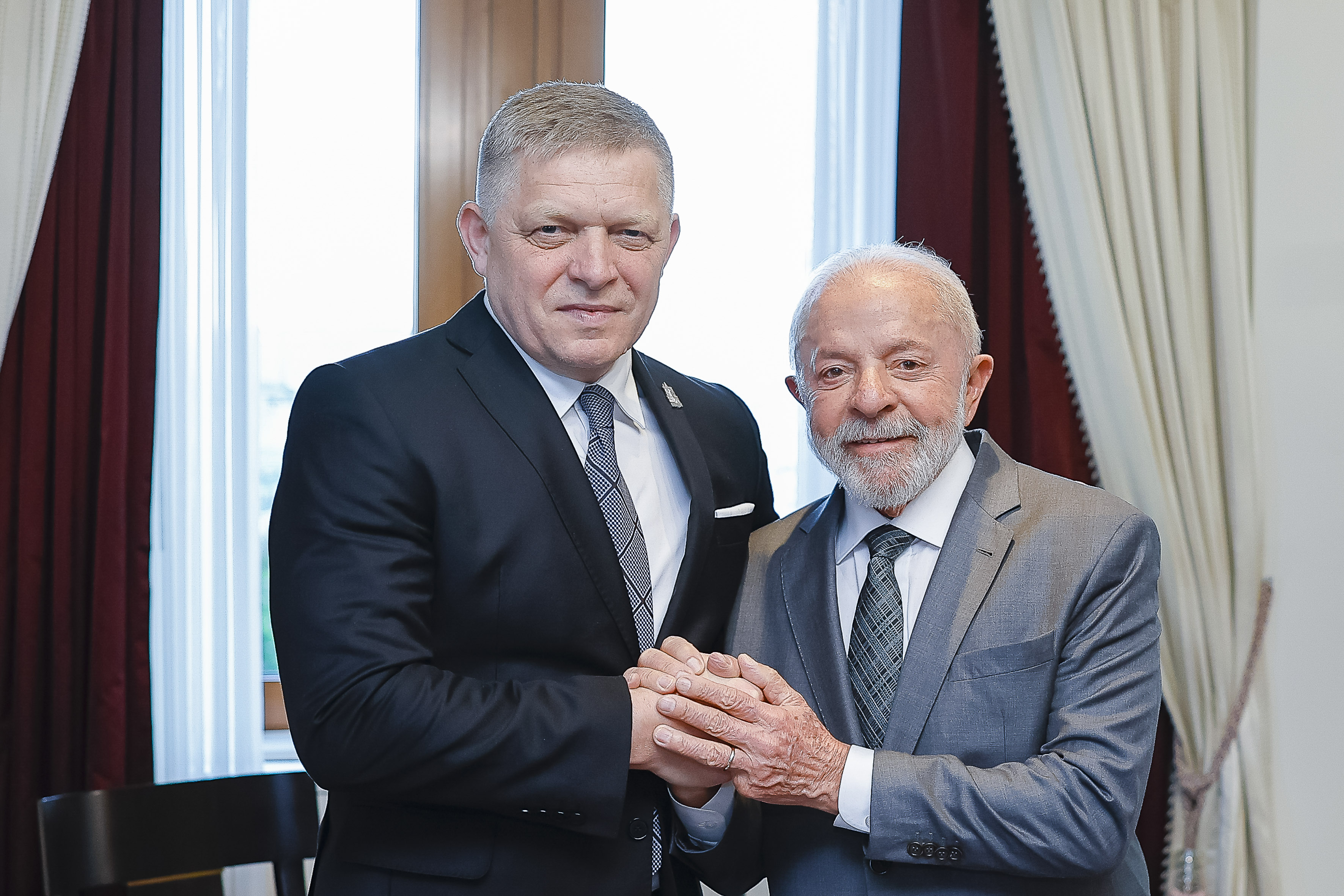
Despite Western pressure to isolate Moscow, both Fico and Brazilian President Luiz Inácio Lula da Silva maintained and even expanded ties with Russia

Fico has actively courted and praised Catholic figures like Cardinal Ján Chryzostom Korec, who, in turn, expressed support for him, saying Fico "has all the qualities of a good president" during his 2014 presidential campaign.

Fico has publicly expressed a positive affinity for several international figures, including former Serbian President Aleksandar Vučić, whom he has called a "friend". He also considered former Hungarian prime minister Viktor Orbán a close ally and a leader who did not fear to openly defend the interests of his people. Fico has maintained contacts with Russian President Vladimir Putin despite Russia's invasion of Ukraine, actively opposing Western military aid to Kyiv and frequently blocking or threatening to veto EU sanctions against Russia.

Fico is a member of the Slovak Matica and supports Slovak Union of Anti-Fascist Fighters.

In 2025, Fico addressed the Conservative Political Action Conferences, which aim to gather conservatives, in the United States in February and in Hungary in May.

=== Relationship with the media ===
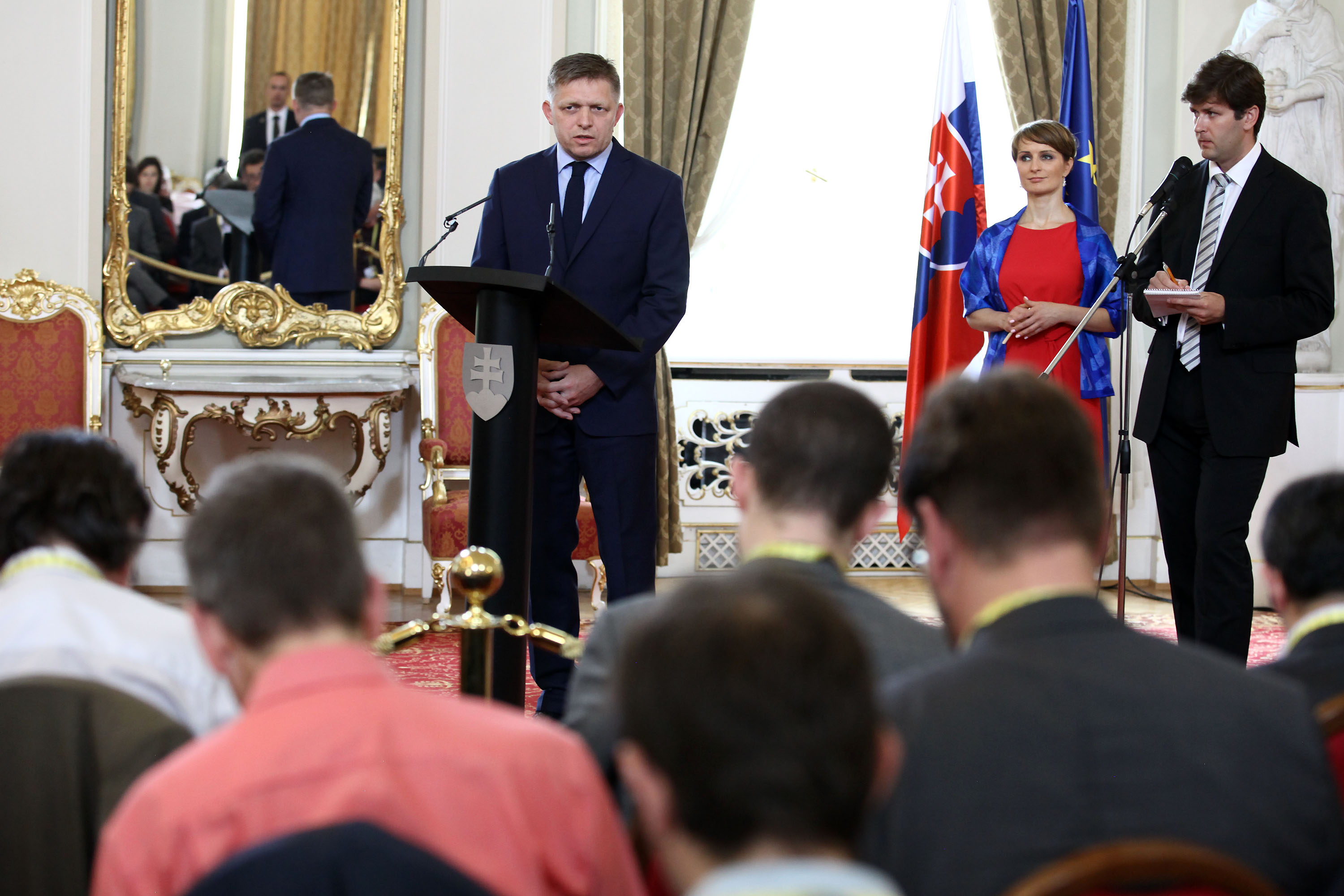
Fico at a press press conference in Bratislava, June 2016

During his press conferences, Robert Fico often verbally attacks, belittles, and taunts the present journalists, often accusing them of bias and attacking his government. On several occasions he has openly and on record used profanities against specific journalists, such as "idiots", "pricks", "prostitutes", "snakes", and "hyenas". He has also been recorded ridiculing journalists' physical appearance.

== Personal life ==
Fico has two siblings, younger sister Lucia who is a prosecutor and older brother Ladislav.

Fico is married to Svetlana Ficová (née Svobodová), a lawyer and professor from Žilina. They were classmates while they both studied law at the Comenius University in Bratislava, and they married in 1988. They have one son together, Michal (b. 1994), who studied at the University of Economics in Bratislava. Despite his marriage, Fico hasn't lived with his wife since 2019, and doesn't attend any official events with her. At least since 2020, Fico has practiced an open relationship with Katarína Szalayová; they have been seen together in public on many occasions.

Fico became a grandfather in 2022, as his son Michal Fico and his wife welcomed a daughter.

=== Wealth ===
Fico's property situation has drawn significant public and media scrutiny over the years. At the beginning of his political career, Fico and his family lived in Bratislava's Dlhé diely, in an ordinary apartment in a panel house. In 2008, Fico moved into a residential Apartment complex Čmelovec located in Bratislava's Old Town, near Bratislava Castle, which belongs to the Diplomatic Services Bureau.

Since 2012, he has been known for renting luxury properties rather than owning them. Notably, he lived in a large apartment within the Bonaparte complex, located in Bratislava's Old Town, which was a 377-square-meter luxurious residence. He rented this apartment starting in 2012 from businessman Ladislav Bašternák, who was later convicted of tax fraud. This arrangement, which cost €2,850 monthly, became a source of criticism and was cited in political controversies.

After leaving the Bonaparte complex in 2019, Fico stayed in various temporary residences. In January 2021, Fico moved into a luxury apartment in the Sokolská Residence, which he rented from his party colleague Dušan Muňko in a highly desirable and lucrative part of Bratislava. This residence is located in the Old Town district, specifically in the prestigious diplomatic quarter under the Slavín memorial, which is known for its high-end residential character. In 2023, Fico purchased a 135-square-meter apartment in the residence for €509,000, securing it at a price significantly below the expert-estimated market value of €750,000 to €1 million.

In 2002, Fico purchased an 820-square-meter vineyard plot in Bratislava's New Town for a notably low price of approximately €1,850 (less than 37,000 SKK). In 2007, opposition leader Mikuláš Dzurinda accused Fico of a speculative purchase, claiming the land's subsequent reclassification for construction had inflated its value to approximately €180,000 (SKK 6 million). Fico vehemently denied the claims of speculation, stating, "I'm not an idiot to ruin my reputation for 800 square meters of vineyard", and subsequently retaliated against Dzurinda by labeling him a "liar" and filing a criminal charge, stating that he possessed official documents proving the property was registered strictly as a vineyard.

His income largely stems from his political office. As the prime minister of Slovakia, his salary is substantial. Reports from 2025 indicate his annual salary is approximately €144,000 (or roughly 8 times the national average). In June 2024, a law was passed that grants a lifetime salary to former prime ministers who have served more than two full electoral cycles. As the longest-serving prime minister, Fico is currently the only politician who qualifies for this retirement benefit.

=== Health ===
In July 2009, Fico faced cervical spine problems (neck and back pain) severe enough to disrupt his official schedule.

In February 2014, Fico seriously injured his left foot during a football match in Košice, which was part of his campaign before the presidential election. His injury required emergency surgery at the Kramáre Hospital in Bratislava. In the hospital, he was diagnosed with a torn Achilles tendon.

Fico experienced a recurrence of his serious spinal health issues in April 2014, five years after his first reported incident. These health problems, involving his neck and back, were significant enough to force him to cancel a portion of his official public schedule.

In April 2016, Fico underwent coronary triple bypass surgery in the National Institute of Cardiovascular Diseases in Bratislava.

In December 2019, Fico left the annual Direction – Social Democracy party congress to seek medical treatment due to high blood pressure.

In summer 2021, while on vacation in Greece, Fico passed out during breakfast. A German cardiologist from the next table helped him, thinking he had a heart attack. He was taken to the hospital, where doctors found out that it was COVID-19, which, combined with fever and low blood pressure, had caused him to pass out. Over the next few days in Crete, Fico stayed in quarantine.

On 15 May 2024, Fico was shot several times in an assassination attempt and was subsequently hospitalized at the F.D. Roosevelt Hospital in Banská Bystrica. Fico was reportedly in a "life-threatening" condition after the attack, having suffered wounds to his stomach, arms, and legs, but was stabilized following emergency surgery.

Fico's recovery from the assassination attempt continued throughout late 2024 and into 2025, marked by ongoing health complications. He frequently canceled or cut short public engagements, often attributing this to vague health issues, though he hinted that the problems were linked to digestion as a result of the shooting. These persistent issues led to more significant disruptions, such as the cancellation of a summit trip in October 2025, which he officially excused due to "worsened health problems still related to last year's attack".

=== Religion ===
Fico has rarely discussed his religious life in public. In his application to join the Communist Party of Czechoslovakia in 1984, Fico stated that he was "strictly atheistic", as was required to be accepted. According to the testimonial from college added to the application, he held a "scientific Marxist-Leninist worldview" and "no problems concerning religion."

In a promotional video during presidential election campaign in 2014, Fico said he grew up in a Catholic family and that he considers himself a Catholic. He discussed his baptism, Holy Communion, Confirmation and how the Catholic faith had impacted his childhood. He stated: "Perhaps if I did my profile in relation to the Catholic Church, I would end up better off than any MP of the KDH." He also described growing up with his grandfather, a man who "very strictly respected the rules of standard Christian life", stating that it profoundly impacted him. Patrik Dubovský, a historian and former researcher of the National Memory Institute, considers it to be an attempt to manipulate public opinion because "confirmation was in direct conflict with Communist Party membership, whose political programme was based on atheism." During the Communist period, religiously active people were severely persecuted, especially after the repression of Charter 77.

During a televised debate, Fico refused to answer a television presenter's question about whether he is a Christian or an atheist, and said that he considered it a private matter. Regarding the sacraments, Fico said that he was baptised as an infant and the Holy Communion with Confirmation followed afterwards, as he said it was with every child who grew up in his home village.

In April 2025, Fico released a statement on social media following the death of Pope Francis, where he called himself "a man of deep faith".

=== Language ===
Apart from his native Slovak language, Fico is fluent in English and Russian.

=== Alleged extramarital affairs ===
In August 2010, Fico was photographed at night in downtown Bratislava together with a woman, who was later revealed to be 25-year-old Jana Halászová, a secretary at the Direction – Social Democracy party headquarters. It was later revealed that Halászová had been given extensive privileges, including her own parking space in the Parliament car park, without being a member. In addition, both her sister and step-mother had recently been given jobs within various ministries. In August 2013, Fico was photographed while embracing and kissing his now-secretary Halászová, after taking her for a private dinner at a chateau in Čereňany, 160 kilometres from Bratislava. The photos created another round of speculation about the true nature of their relationship, as well as whether or not he had used public funds to pay for the dinner.

== Awards and honors ==
=== Foreign ===
- Czech Republic:
  - Order of the White Lion (2014)

Fico received the Order of the White Lion for his contribution to the Czech-Slovak relations by Czech President Miloš Zeman.

== See also ==
- Domestic policy of Robert Fico
- Foreign policy of Robert Fico
- List of current heads of state and government
- List of heads of the executive by approval rating

== Notes ==
Political offices
| Preceded by Mikuláš Dzurinda | Prime Minister of Slovakia; 2006–2010 | Succeeded by Iveta Radičová |
| Preceded by Iveta Radičová | Prime Minister of Slovakia; 2012–2018 | Succeeded by Peter Pellegrini |
| Preceded by Ľudovít Ódor | Prime Minister of Slovakia; 2023–present | Incumbent |
Party political offices
| New title | Chairman of Direction – Social Democracy; 1999–present | Incumbent |
