= Hrušovany, Topoľčany District =

Hrušovany Nyitrakörtvélyes
- Municipality
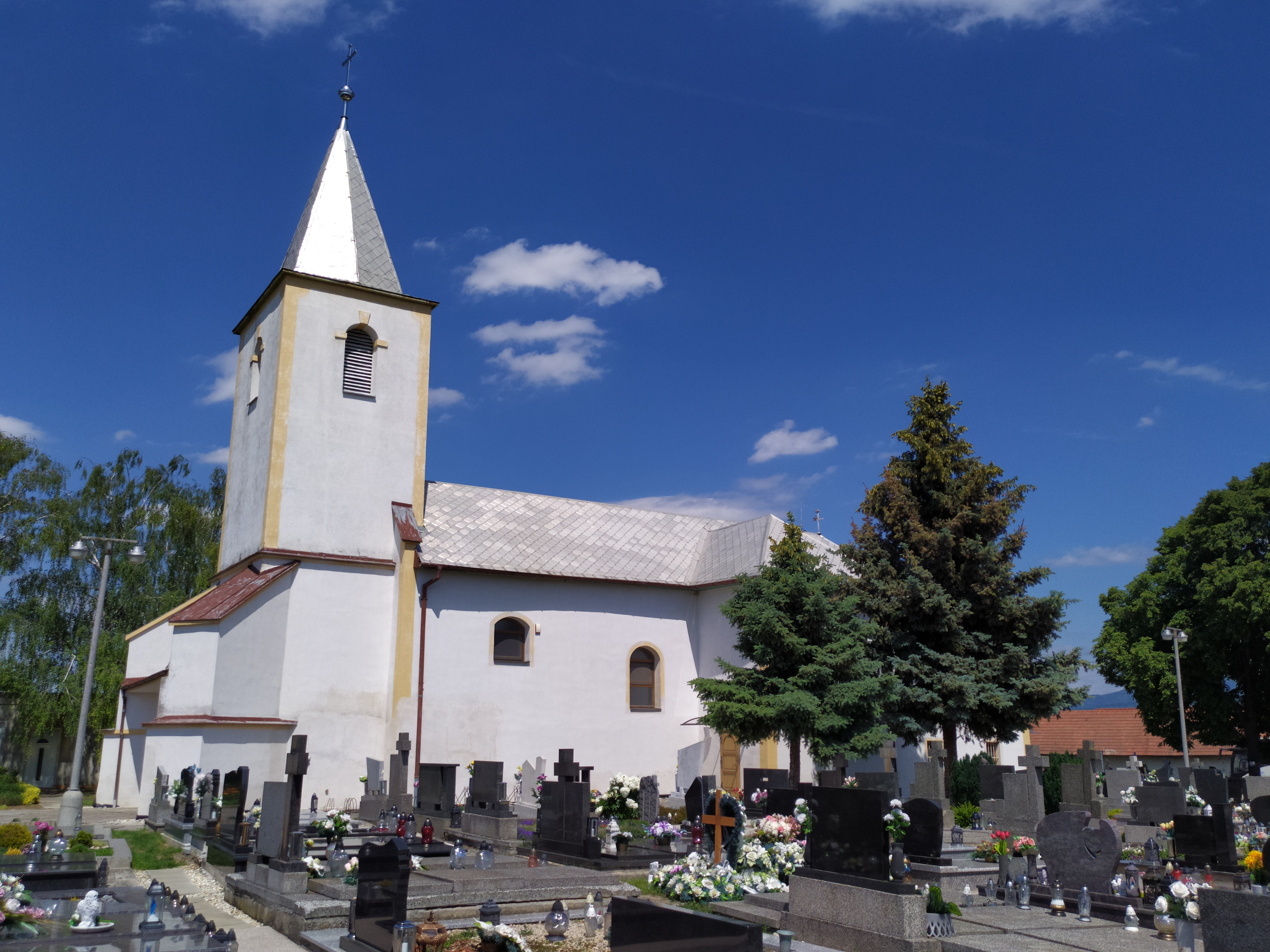
- St. Martin's Church

- Flag

- Location of Hrušovany in the Nitra Region Location of Hrušovany in Slovakia
- Coordinates: 48°26′11″N 18°5′38″E
- Country: Slovakia
- Region: Nitra Region
- District: Topoľčany District
- First mentioned: 1318

Government
  - Mayor: Jozef Benca (SMER-SD)

Area
  - Total: 5.54 km^{2} (2.14 sq mi)
- Elevation: 158 m (518 ft)

Population (2025)
  - Total: 1,047
- Time zone: UTC+1 (CET)
  - Summer (DST): UTC+2 (CEST)
- Postal code: 956 13
- Area code: +421 38
- Vehicle registration plate (until 2022): TO
- Website: www.hrusovany.sk

Hrušovany (Hungarian: Nyitrakörtvélyes) is a municipality in the Topoľčany District of the Nitra Region, Slovakia. In 2011 it had 1116 inhabitants.

The village has well-developed infrastructure, including a kindergarten, primary school, gas distribution network, and indoor and outdoor sport facilities. The municipalities most important landmarks are its 17th century church and belfry.

== History ==
Evidence of human habitation in the village dates back to the Neolithic period, with archaeological excavations indicating that its inhabitants belonged to the Linear Pottery culture. During the Great Moravian period, Hrušovany was populated by Slavs.

The town was first mentioned under the Hungarian name "Kurtveles'" in 1318, and in 1392 the town was documented in diplomas as "Kerthuely". The town fell under the jurisdiction of the Diocese of Nitra, and beginning in 1392, was a part of the Hungarian House of Apponyi.

A Roman Catholic Church was constructed in the 17th century, and was extensively renovated in 1736. The church's belfry was constructed in the mid 19th century. The town was devastated by repeated fires in the years 1825, 1835, and 1889. Its inhabitants subsisted on agriculture and viticulture.

Following the Treaty of Trianon, the town was reassigned from Nyitra County in the Kingdom of Hungary, to become a part of Topoľčany District, in the newly formed country of Slovakia.

== Population ==
Population statistic (10 years)
Year	1995	2005	2015	2025
Count	1130	1133	1097	1047
Difference		+0.26%	−3.17%	−4.55%

Population statistic
Year	2024	2025
Count	1056	1047
Difference		−0.85%

It has a population of 1047 people (31 December 2025).

=== Ethnicity ===
Census 2021 (1+%)
Ethnicity	Number	Fraction
Slovak	1057	96.79%
Not found out	29	2.65%
Total	1092	

In year 2021 was 1092 people by ethnicity 1057 as Slovak, 29 as Not found out, 9 as Romanian, 4 as Russian, 4 as Hungarian, 1 as German and 1 as Other.

Note on population: The difference values of population numbers in the table "Population statistic" and in the sections "Ethnicity" & "Religion" is caused by the use of various statistical methods.

=== Religion ===
Census 2021 (1+%)
Religion	Number	Fraction
Roman Catholic Church	910	83.33%
None	114	10.44%
Not found out	35	3.21%
Total	1092	

In year 2021 was 1092 people by religion 910 from Roman Catholic Church, 114 from None, 35 from Not found out, 9 from Evangelical Church, 5 from Greek Catholic Church, 5 from Ad hoc movements, 4 from Apostolic Church, 3 from Other, 2 from Old Catholic Church, 2 from Eastern Orthodox Church, 1 from Calvinist Church, 1 from Paganism and natural spirituality and 1 from Buddhism.

== See also ==
- List of municipalities and towns in Slovakia

== Genealogical resources ==
The records for genealogical research are available at the state archive "Statny Archiv in Nitra, Slovakia"

- Roman Catholic church records (births/marriages/deaths): 1696-1896 (parish B)
