= List of members of the National Council of Slovakia, 2023–2027 =

The new National Council of Slovakia was elected at the 2023 Slovak parliamentary election and consists of 150 representatives elected from party lists. Those elected will sit on the National Council until 2027.

The election to the National Council of Slovakia was held on 30 September 2023, the inaugural session took place on 25 October 2023, and on 21 November 2023, the National Council approved the government's policy statement and expressed confidence in the fourth cabinet of Robert Fico, with 78 of 143 members of parliament present voting in favour and 65 against.

== Composition ==
Party	Votes	%	Seats	+/–
Direction – Social Democracy	681,017	22.95	42	+4
Progressive Slovakia	533,136	17.96	32	+32
Voice – Social Democracy	436,415	14.70	27	New
OĽaNO and Friends	264,137	8.90	16	–49
Christian Democratic Movement	202,515	6.82	12	+12
Freedom and Solidarity	187,645	6.32	11	–2
Slovak National Party	166,995	5.63	10	+10
Republic	141,099	4.75	0	New
Alliance	130,183	4.39	0	0
Democrats	87,006	2.93	0	0
We Are Family	65,673	2.21	0	–17
People's Party Our Slovakia	25,003	0.84	0	–17
Communist Party of Slovakia	9,867	0.33	0	New
Pirate Party – Slovakia	9,358	0.32	0	New
Modrí, Most–Híd	7,935	0.27	0	New
Hungarian Forum	3,486	0.12	0	New
MySlovensko	2,786	0.09	0	New
Karma	2,407	0.08	0	New
Common Citizens of Slovakia	2,401	0.08	0	New
HEART Patriots and Pensioners – Slovak National Unity	2,315	0.08	0	New
Princíp	1,817	0.06	0	New
99% – Civic Voice	1,335	0.04	0	0
Slovak Revival Movement	1,332	0.04	0	0
Patriotic Bloc	1,262	0.04	0	New
Slovak Democratic and Christian Union – Democratic Party	771	0.03	0	New
Total	2,967,896	100.00	150	0
Valid votes	2,967,896	98.83		
Invalid/blank votes	35,052	1.17		
Total votes	3,002,948	100.00		
Registered voters/turnout	4,388,872	68.42		
Source: Results

== Leadership ==
Function	Name	Parliamentary group	From	To	Number of votes	References
Speaker	Peter Pellegrini (Note: Peter Pellegrini had lost his mandate upon being elected to the presidency.)	Voice – Social Democracy	25 October 2023	7 April 2024	131 of 148	
Speaker	Peter Žiga	Voice – Social Democracy	7 April 2024	26 March 2025	acting	
Speaker	Richard Raši	Voice – Social Democracy	26 March 2025	Incumbent	79 of 79	
Deputy Speaker	Ľuboš Blaha (Note: Ľuboš Blaha had resigned after being elected to the European Parliament.)	Direction – Social Democracy	25 October 2023	25 June 2024	82 of 142	
Deputy Speaker	Tibor Gašpar	Direction – Social Democracy	27 June 2024	Incumbent	79 of 140	
Deputy Speaker	Peter Žiga	Voice – Social Democracy	25 October 2023	Incumbent	88 of 142	
Deputy Speaker	Andrej Danko	Slovak National Party	25 October 2023	Incumbent	83 of 142	
Deputy Speaker	Michal Šimečka (Note: Michal Šimečka had been revoked through the parliamentary vote of 76 MPs.)	Progressive Slovakia	25 October 2023	17 September 2024	92 of 142	
Deputy Speaker	Martin Dubéci	Progressive Slovakia	18 June 2025	Incumbent	78 of 79	

== List of members ==
Name	Parliamentary group		Notes	Ref.
Name	Elected	Current	Notes	Ref.
Vladimír Baláž	Direction – Social Democracy	Direction – Social Democracy		
Jaroslav Baška	Direction – Social Democracy	Direction – Social Democracy		
Marcela Čavojová	Direction – Social Democracy	Direction – Social Democracy		
Vladimír Faič	Direction – Social Democracy	Direction – Social Democracy		
Dušan Galis	Direction – Social Democracy	Direction – Social Democracy		
Tibor Gašpar	Direction – Social Democracy	Direction – Social Democracy	Deputy Speaker	
Richard Glück	Direction – Social Democracy	Direction – Social Democracy	Replaced Martin Nemky as substitute MP	
Pavol Goga	Direction – Social Democracy	Direction – Social Democracy	Replaced Igor Melicher as substitute MP	
Jozef Habánik	Direction – Social Democracy	Direction – Social Democracy		
Augustín Hambálek	Direction – Social Democracy	Direction – Social Democracy		
Ivan Hazucha	Direction – Social Democracy	Direction – Social Democracy	Replaced Robert Kaliňák as substitute MP, later succeeded Erik Kaliňák as MP	
Ján Horváth	Direction – Social Democracy	Direction – Social Democracy	Replaced Robert Fico as substitute MP	
Dušan Jarjabek	Direction – Social Democracy	Direction – Social Democracy		
Jozef Ježík	Direction – Social Democracy	Direction – Social Democracy		
Jozef Kačmár	Direction – Social Democracy	Direction – Social Democracy	Replaced Robert Kaliňák as substitute MP	
Michal Kapuš	Direction – Social Democracy	Direction – Social Democracy	Replaced Igor Choma as substitute MP	
Daniel Karas	Direction – Social Democracy	Direction – Social Democracy		
Marián Kéry	Direction – Social Democracy	Direction – Social Democracy		
Stanislav Kubánek	Direction – Social Democracy	Direction – Social Democracy		
Ján Kvorka	Direction – Social Democracy	Direction – Social Democracy		
Boleslav Lešo	Direction – Social Democracy	Direction – Social Democracy	Replaced Juraj Blanár as substitute MP, later succeeded Jana Vaľová as MP	
Michal Lukša	Direction – Social Democracy	Direction – Social Democracy	Replaced Ladislav Kamenický as substitute MP	
Vladimír Macášek	Direction – Social Democracy	Direction – Social Democracy	Replaced Juraj Blanár as substitute MP	
Zuzana Matejičková	Direction – Social Democracy	Direction – Social Democracy		
Ján Mažgút	Direction – Social Democracy	Direction – Social Democracy		
Jaroslav Mego	Direction – Social Democracy	Direction – Social Democracy	Replaced Juraj Gedra as substitute MP	
Dušan Muňko	Direction – Social Democracy	Slovak National Party		
František Petro	Direction – Social Democracy	Direction – Social Democracy		
Zuzana Plevíková	Direction – Social Democracy	Direction – Social Democracy	Replaced Boris Susko as substitute MP	
Ján Podmanický	Direction – Social Democracy	Direction – Social Democracy		
Ján Richter	Direction – Social Democracy	Direction – Social Democracy		
Marián Saloň	Direction – Social Democracy	Direction – Social Democracy		
Justín Sedlák	Direction – Social Democracy	Direction – Social Democracy		
Andrej Sitkár	Direction – Social Democracy	Direction – Social Democracy	Replaced Robert Fico as substitute MP, later succeeded Ľuboš Blaha as MP	
Peter Sokol	Direction – Social Democracy	Direction – Social Democracy	Replaced Jozef Smatana as substitute MP	
Anton Stredák	Direction – Social Democracy	Direction – Social Democracy		
Michal Stuška	Direction – Social Democracy	Direction – Social Democracy		
Peter Šuca	Direction – Social Democracy	Direction – Social Democracy		
Igor Válek	Direction – Social Democracy	Direction – Social Democracy	Replaced Richard Takáč as substitute MP	
Jozef Valocký	Direction – Social Democracy	Direction – Social Democracy		
Ľubomír Vážny	Direction – Social Democracy	Direction – Social Democracy		
Viliam Zahorčák	Direction – Social Democracy	Direction – Social Democracy		
Irena Bihariová	Progressive Slovakia	Progressive Slovakia		
Dávid Dej	Progressive Slovakia	Progressive Slovakia		
Martin Dubéci	Progressive Slovakia	Progressive Slovakia	Deputy Speaker	
Richard Dubovický	Progressive Slovakia	Progressive Slovakia	Replaced Tomáš Hellebrandt as substitute MP	
Oskar Dvořák	Progressive Slovakia	Progressive Slovakia		
Tina Gažovičová	Progressive Slovakia	Progressive Slovakia		
Gréta Gregorová	Progressive Slovakia	Progressive Slovakia	Replaced Viera Kalmárová as substitute MP	
Jana Hanuliaková	Progressive Slovakia	Progressive Slovakia		
Ján Hargaš	Progressive Slovakia	Progressive Slovakia		
Zora Jaurová	Progressive Slovakia	Progressive Slovakia		
Beáta Jurík	Progressive Slovakia	Progressive Slovakia		
Štefan Kišš	Progressive Slovakia	Progressive Slovakia		
Dana Kleinert	Progressive Slovakia	Progressive Slovakia		
Ingrid Kosová	Progressive Slovakia	Progressive Slovakia		
Marek Lackovič	Progressive Slovakia	Progressive Slovakia	Replaced Michal Wiezik as substitute MP	
Darina Luščíková	Progressive Slovakia	Progressive Slovakia		
Zuzana Mesterová	Progressive Slovakia	Progressive Slovakia		
Natália Nash	Progressive Slovakia	Progressive Slovakia	Replaced Martin Pekár as substitute MP	
Simona Petrík	Progressive Slovakia	Progressive Slovakia		
Lucia Plaváková	Progressive Slovakia	Progressive Slovakia		
Ondrej Prostredník	Progressive Slovakia	Progressive Slovakia		
Michal Sabo	Progressive Slovakia	Progressive Slovakia		
Jaroslav Spišiak	Progressive Slovakia	Progressive Slovakia		
Tamara Stohlová	Progressive Slovakia	Progressive Slovakia		
Michal Šimečka	Progressive Slovakia	Progressive Slovakia	Former Deputy Speaker	
Veronika Šrobová	Progressive Slovakia	Progressive Slovakia		
Ivan Štefunko	Progressive Slovakia	Progressive Slovakia		
Zuzana Števulová	Progressive Slovakia	Progressive Slovakia		
Michal Truban	Progressive Slovakia	Progressive Slovakia		
Tomáš Valášek	Progressive Slovakia	Progressive Slovakia		
Branislav Vančo	Progressive Slovakia	Progressive Slovakia		
Veronika Veslárová	Progressive Slovakia	Progressive Slovakia		
Michal Bartek	Voice – Social Democracy	Voice – Social Democracy	Replaced Lucia Kurilovská as substitute MP	
Branislav Becík	Voice – Social Democracy	Voice – Social Democracy		
Ján Blcháč	Voice – Social Democracy	Voice – Social Democracy		
Jozef Cech	Voice – Social Democracy	Voice – Social Democracy	Replaced Richard Raši as substitute MP, later succeeded Michal Moško as MP	
Miroslav Čellár	Voice – Social Democracy	Voice – Social Democracy	Replaced Zuzana Dolinková as substitute MP, later replaced Erik Tomáš as substitute MP	
Dávid Demečko	Voice – Social Democracy	Voice – Social Democracy	Replaced Denisa Saková as substitute MP	
Richard Eliáš	Voice – Social Democracy	Voice – Social Democracy		
Ján Ferenčák	Voice – Social Democracy	Independent		
Štefan Gašparovič	Voice – Social Democracy	Voice – Social Democracy	Replaced Erik Tomáš as substitute MP, later succeeded Zuzana Dolinková as MP	
Ján Hrubý	Voice – Social Democracy	Voice – Social Democracy	Replaced Tomáš Drucker as substitute MP, later resigned, and subsequently returned and replaced Samuel Migaľ as substitute MP, then succeeded Peter Kmec as MP	
Karol Janas	Voice – Social Democracy	Voice – Social Democracy		
Peter Kalivoda	Voice – Social Democracy	Voice – Social Democracy		
Ľubica Laššáková	Voice – Social Democracy	Voice – Social Democracy		
Zdenka Mačicová	Voice – Social Democracy	Voice – Social Democracy	Replaced Kamil Šaško as substitute MP	
Roman Malatinec	Voice – Social Democracy	Independent		
Peter Náhlik	Voice – Social Democracy	Voice – Social Democracy		
Alena Nováková	Voice – Social Democracy	Voice – Social Democracy	Replaced Matúš Šutaj Eštok as substitute MP	
Róbert Puci	Voice – Social Democracy	Voice – Social Democracy		
Paula Puškárová	Voice – Social Democracy	Voice – Social Democracy	Replaced Michal Kaliňák as substitute MP	
Richard Raši	Voice – Social Democracy	Voice – Social Democracy	Speaker; Raši did not take up his mandate and was replaced by Andrea Szabóová, but later assumed his seat in parliament	
Peter Slyško	Voice – Social Democracy	Independent	Replaced Peter Kmec as substitute MP, lost mandate after Kmec took up his mandate, later replaced Samuel Migaľ as substitute MP	
Zdenko Svoboda	Voice – Social Democracy	Voice – Social Democracy	Replaced Tomáš Drucker as substitute MP	
Andrea Szabóová	Voice – Social Democracy	Voice – Social Democracy	Replaced Richard Raši as substitute MP, later replaced Radomír Šalitroš as substitute MP	
Igor Šimko	Voice – Social Democracy	Voice – Social Democracy		
Dušan Tittel	Voice – Social Democracy	Voice – Social Democracy		
Erik Vlček	Voice – Social Democracy	Voice – Social Democracy		
Peter Žiga	Voice – Social Democracy	Voice – Social Democracy	Deputy Speaker, former acting Speaker	
Lukáš Bužo	Slovakia	Slovakia		
Igor Dušenka	Slovakia	Slovakia	Replaced Anna Záborská as substitute MP	
Ľubomír Galko	Slovakia	Independent		
Gábor Grendel	Slovakia	Slovakia		
Július Jakab	Slovakia	Slovakia	Replaced Jozef Viskupič as substitute MP	
Marek Krajčí	Slovakia	Slovakia		
Rastislav Krátky	Slovakia	Christian Democratic Movement	Replaced Erika Jurinová as substitute MP	
Igor Matovič	Slovakia	Slovakia		
Roman Mikulec	Slovakia	Slovakia		
Peter Pollák	Slovakia	Slovakia		
Jozef Pročko	Slovakia	Slovakia		
Veronika Remišová	Slovakia	Slovakia		
Michal Šipoš	Slovakia	Slovakia		
Anežka Škopová	Slovakia	Slovakia		
Viliam Tankó	Slovakia	Progressive Slovakia		
Richard Vašečka	Slovakia	Independent		
Martina Bajo Holečková	Christian Democratic Movement	Freedom and Solidarity		
Marián Čaučík	Christian Democratic Movement	Christian Democratic Movement		
Ján Horecký	Christian Democratic Movement	Christian Democratic Movement		
Igor Janckulík	Christian Democratic Movement	Christian Democratic Movement		
Monika Kolejáková	Christian Democratic Movement	Christian Democratic Movement	Replaced Martin Šmilňák as substitute MP	
František Majerský	Christian Democratic Movement	Christian Democratic Movement		
Milan Majerský	Christian Democratic Movement	Christian Democratic Movement		
František Mikloško	Christian Democratic Movement	Christian Democratic Movement		
Gabriel Paľa	Christian Democratic Movement	Christian Democratic Movement	Replaced Jozef Hajko as substitute MP	
Peter Stachura	Christian Democratic Movement	Christian Democratic Movement		
Branislav Škripek	Christian Democratic Movement	Christian Democratic Movement		
Andrea Turčanová	Christian Democratic Movement	Christian Democratic Movement		
Jana Bittó Cigániková	Freedom and Solidarity	Independent		
Ondrej Dostál	Freedom and Solidarity	Freedom and Solidarity		
Karol Galek	Freedom and Solidarity	Freedom and Solidarity	Replaced Richard Sulík as substitute MP	
Branislav Gröhling	Freedom and Solidarity	Freedom and Solidarity		
Alojz Hlina	Freedom and Solidarity	Freedom and Solidarity		
Mária Kolíková	Freedom and Solidarity	Freedom and Solidarity		
Juraj Krúpa	Freedom and Solidarity	Freedom and Solidarity	Replaced Juraj Droba as substitute MP	
Vladimír Ledecký	Freedom and Solidarity	Freedom and Solidarity		
Vladimíra Marcinková	Freedom and Solidarity	Freedom and Solidarity		
Tomáš Szalay	Freedom and Solidarity	Freedom and Solidarity		
Marián Viskupič	Freedom and Solidarity	Freedom and Solidarity		
Andrej Danko	Slovak National Party	Slovak National Party	Deputy Speaker	
Karol Farkašovský	Slovak National Party	Slovak National Party	Replaced Filip Kuffa as substitute MP	
Peter Kotlár	Slovak National Party	Slovak National Party		
Milan Kováč	Slovak National Party	Slovak National Party	Replaced Rudolf Huliak as substitute MP	
Dagmar Kramplová	Slovak National Party	Slovak National Party	Replaced Štefan Kuffa as substitute MP	
Adam Lučanský	Slovak National Party	Slovak National Party	Replaced Martina Šimkovičová as substitute MP	
Pavel Ľupták	Slovak National Party	Independent		
Roman Michelko	Slovak National Party	Slovak National Party		
Ivan Ševčík	Slovak National Party	Independent		
Tomáš Taraba	Slovak National Party	Independent	Taraba did not take up his mandate and was replaced by Milan Garaj, but later assumed his seat in parliament	

== List of former members ==
Name	Parliamentary group	Date of departure	Notes	Ref.
Ľuboš Blaha	Direction – Social Democracy	12 July 2024	Former Deputy Speaker; Resigned; Replaced by Andrej Sitkár	
Juraj Blanár	Direction – Social Democracy	25 October 2023	Did not take up his mandate; Replaced by Boleslav Lešo, later replaced by Vladimír Macášek	
Robert Fico	Direction – Social Democracy	25 October 2023	Did not take up his mandate; Replaced by Andrej Sitkár, later replaced by Ján Horváth	
Juraj Gedra	Direction – Social Democracy	25 October 2023	Did not take up his mandate; Replaced by Jaroslav Mego	
Igor Choma	Direction – Social Democracy	25 October 2023	Did not take up his mandate; Replaced by Michal Kapuš	
Erik Kaliňák	Direction – Social Democracy	12 July 2024	Resigned; Replaced by Ivan Hazucha	
Robert Kaliňák	Direction – Social Democracy	25 October 2023	Did not take up his mandate; Replaced by Ivan Hazucha, later replaced by Jozef Kačmár	
Ladislav Kamenický	Direction – Social Democracy	25 October 2023	Did not take up his mandate; Replaced by Michal Lukša	
Igor Melicher	Direction – Social Democracy	25 October 2023	Did not take up his mandate; Replaced by Pavol Goga	
Martin Nemky	Direction – Social Democracy	7 February 2024	Did not take up his mandate; Replaced by Richard Glück	
Jozef Smatana	Direction – Social Democracy	25 October 2023	Did not take up his mandate; Replaced by Peter Sokol	
Boris Susko	Direction – Social Democracy	25 October 2023	Did not take up his mandate; Replaced by Zuzana Plevíková	
Richard Takáč	Direction – Social Democracy	25 October 2023	Did not take up his mandate; Replaced by Igor Válek	
Jana Vaľová	Direction – Social Democracy	20 November 2025	Resigned; Replaced by Boleslav Lešo	
Tomáš Hellebrandt	Progressive Slovakia	6 February 2024	Resigned; Replaced by Richard Dubovický	
Martin Pekár	Progressive Slovakia	30 November 2023	Resigned; Replaced by Natália Nash	
Viera Kalmárová	Progressive Slovakia	2 September 2025	Resigned; Replaced by Gréta Gregorová	
Michal Wiezik	Progressive Slovakia	23 October 2023	Resigned; Replaced by Marek Lackovič	
Zuzana Dolinková	Voice – Social Democracy	25 October 2023	Did not take up her mandate, later resigned; Replaced by Miroslav Čellár, later replaced by Štefan Gašparovič	
Tomáš Drucker	Voice – Social Democracy	25 October 2023	Did not take up his mandate; Replaced by Ján Hrubý, later replaced by Zdenko Svoboda	
Michal Kaliňák	Voice – Social Democracy	25 October 2023	Did not take up his mandate; Replaced by Paula Puškárová	
Peter Kmec	Voice – Social Democracy	30 June 2026	Did not take up his mandate, later assumed the mandate and then resigned; Replaced by Peter Slyško, later replaced by Ján Hrubý	
Lucia Kurilovská	Voice – Social Democracy	25 October 2023	Did not take up her mandate; Replaced by Michal Bartek	
Samuel Migaľ	Voice – Social Democracy	19 March 2025	Did not take up his mandate; Replaced by Ján Hrubý, later replaced by Peter Slyško	
Michal Moško	Voice – Social Democracy	15 April 2024	Resigned; Replaced by Jozef Cech	
Peter Pellegrini	Voice – Social Democracy	6 April 2024	Former Speaker; Ceased to serve as an MP following his election as President of the Slovak Republic; Replaced by Samuel Migaľ	
Denisa Saková	Voice – Social Democracy	25 October 2023	Did not take up her mandate; Replaced by Samuel Migaľ, later replaced by Dávid Demečko	
Radomír Šalitroš	Voice – Social Democracy	22 March 2025	Did not take up his mandate; Replaced by Andrea Szabóová	
Kamil Šaško	Voice – Social Democracy	25 October 2023	Did not take up his mandate; Replaced by Zdenka Mačicová	
Matúš Šutaj Eštok	Voice – Social Democracy	25 October 2023	Did not take up his mandate; Replaced by Alena Nováková	
Erik Tomáš	Voice – Social Democracy	25 October 2023	Did not take up his mandate; Replaced by Štefan Gašparovič, later replaced by Miroslav Čellár	
Erika Jurinová	Slovakia	18 October 2023	Resigned; Replaced by Rastislav Krátky	
Jozef Viskupič	Slovakia	18 October 2023	Resigned; Replaced by Július Jakab	
Anna Záborská	Slovakia	20 August 2025	Died; Replaced by Igor Dušenka	
Jozef Hajko	Christian Democratic Movement	15 April 2026	Resigned; Replaced by Gabriel Paľa	
Martin Šmilňák	Christian Democratic Movement	30 January 2026	Resigned; Replaced by Monika Kolejáková	
Juraj Dropa	Freedom and Solidarity	23 October 2023	Resigned; Replaced by Juraj Krúpa	
Richard Sulík	Freedom and Solidarity	6 September 2024	Resigned; Replaced by Karol Galek	
Milan Garaj	Slovak National Party	30 September 2026	Replaced Tomáš Taraba; Lost his mandate as a substitute MP after Taraba took up his mandate	
Rudolf Huliak	Slovak National Party	5 March 2025	Did not take up his mandate; Replaced by Miroslav Radačovský, later replaced by Milan Kováč	
Filip Kuffa	Slovak National Party	25 October 2023	Did not take up his mandate; Replaced by Karol Farkašovský	
Štefan Kuffa	Slovak National Party	25 October 2023	Did not take up his mandate; Replaced by Dagmar Kramplová	
Miroslav Radačovský	Slovak National Party	30 June 2026	Replaced Rudolf Huliak; His mandate as a substitute MP ceased upon his appointment as Head of the Diplomatic Mission of the Slovak Republic to the Republic of Cyprus	
Martina Šimkovičová	Slovak National Party	25 October 2023	Did not take up her mandate; Replaced by Adam Lučanský	
