= Tomáš Hellebrandt =

Slovak economist and politician

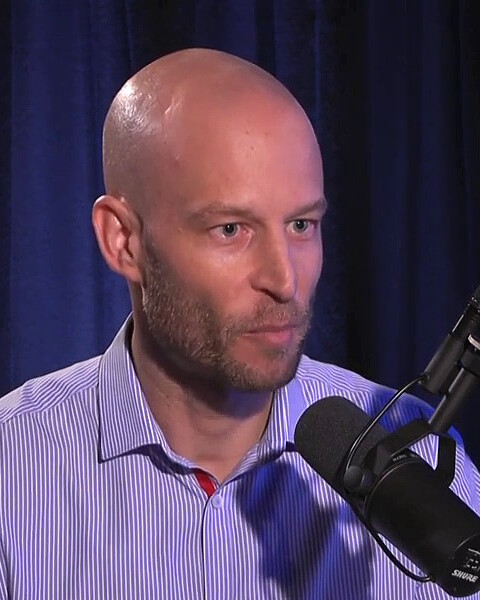
- Tomáš Hellebrandt in 2022

Member of the National Council
- In office 25 October 2023 – 6 February 2024
- Succeeded by: Richard Dubovický

Personal details
- Born: 7 April 1982 (age 44) Žilina, Czechoslovakia
- Party: Progressive Slovakia
- Education: University of Oxford; London School of Economics

Tomáš Hellebrandt (born 7 April 1982) is a Slovak economist and politician. From 2023 to 2024, he served as a Member of the National Council.

== Biography ==
=== Early life and education ===
Tomáš Hellebrandt was born on 7 April 1982 in Žilina. At the age of ten he moved with his parents to Dubai, where he grew up.

Hellebrandt studied economics at the University of Oxford and the London School of Economics. Following graduation, he worked as an economist at the Bank of England and later at the Peterson Institute for International Economics.

Between 2017 and 2022, Hellebrandt worked as an analyst at the Ministry of Finance in Slovakia. He left the ministry after criticizing the minister Igor Matovič for ignoring the evidence presented by the staff of the ministry and cooperating with extreme right politicians to push his agenda through the parliament. The president Zuzana Čaputová subsequently criticized the government for creating a hostile environment for senior civil servants.

=== Political career ===
Following his departure from the ministry, Hellebrandt joined the Progressive Slovakia party and became its economic expert.

In the election campaign leading up to the 2023 Slovak parliamentary election, Hellebrandt became a target of fake news. The far-right online influencer Daniel Bombic claimed Hellebrandt either died or was close to death after receiving the fourth dose of vaccine against COVID-19. Hellebrandt and his political party responded to the rumor by confirming Hellebrandt was in perfect health and criticizing those spreading the rumor for causing needless stress to Hellebrandt's family.

After winning a mandate in the election, Hellebrandt wore a rainbow ribbon on his jacket during the swear in ceremony.

On 6 February 2024, Hellebrandt resigned his MP seat after failing to disclose being infected with HIV while being treated at a hospital in Žilina.

== Private life ==
Hellebrandt considers himself "a proud member of the rainbow community". Together with his fellow Progressive Slovakia MP Lucia Plaváková , he is the third openly gay member of the Slovak parliament, after Edita Angyalová and Stanislav Fořt.
