= Marián Kéry =

Slovak politician (born 1978)

Member of the National Council
- Incumbent
- Assumed office 4 April 2012

Personal details
- Born: 6 February 1978 (age 48) Červený Hrádok, Czechoslovakia
- Party: Direction – Slovak Social Democracy
- Spouse: Adriana Kéryová
- Children: 3
- Education: Constantine the Philosopher University in Nitra; Matej Bel University

Marián Kéry (born 6 February 1978) is a Slovak politician. He has been a Member of the National Council since 2012, representing the Direction – Slovak Social Democracy (SMER) party.

== Early life ==
Kéry was born in Červený Hrádok. He studied History and Russian Language at the Constantine the Philosopher University in Nitra. Following his graduation he worked as a teacher at a grammar school in Zlaté Moravce and elementary school in Červený Hrádok and later in public administration.

== Politics ==
Kéry started in local politics. He became a member of the local assembly in Červený Hrádok at the age of 19. In 2001, he joined SMER and became a regional chairman in Zlaté Moravce. In 2005 he was elected a Representative in the regional assembly of the Nitra Region and since 2012 an MP.

In 2018, Kéry was among the SMER MPs critical of some individuals in the party leadership, including the interior minister Robert Kaliňák, due to them being publicly perceived as corrupt. After the 2020 Slovak parliamentary election, he joined a platform for "Slovakia of Values" together with fellow SMER MP, who later left the party, Ján Podmanický and an extreme right MP Tomáš Taraba.

In his position as the Head of Foreign Affairs committee of the National Council, Kéry pursued a strongly Pro-Russian line prior to and after the 2022 Russian invasion of Ukraine, in stark contrast to the vast majority of Slovak politicians. However, upon the outbreak of the Russia invasion, he condemned it.

== Personal life ==
From the age of 18. Kéry officiated regional football games, however he had to start after 14 years due to a knee injury. He remains closely involved with the local football club FC ViOn Zlaté Moravce.

As of 2022, he was enrolled in a law program at the Matej Bel University. Together with his wife Adriana, he has two daughters.
