= Bratislava Flagpole =

- Bratislavský stožiar
- Location: Namestie Alexandra Dubceka, Bratislava, Slovakia
- Coordinates: 48.1421743°N 17.0982705°E
- Designer: Andrej Danko
- Type: Flagpole
- Material: Steel
- Height: 30 m (98 ft)
- Beginning date: 2019
- Completion date: 2019
- Opening date: September 1, 2019

The Bratislava Flagpole is a 30 m (98 ft) flagpole built in front of the Slovak parliament building, next to Bratislava Castle.

== Financing ==
Although the first estimation was that the flagpole would not cost more than 34.000 EUR incl. VAT, the final cost of the project was 58.043 EUR excl. VAT. The original plan was to have the project financed partly from donations and partly from Government budget, i.e., by Slovak tax payers. After a criticism it was fully financed from donations. The donations came from Andrej Danko (9000 EUR), Daniel Guspan (9000 EUR), Parliamentary club of Smer (5000 EUR), Robert Fico (1000 EUR) and other smaller donors, mostly the members of parliament (30.000 EUR).

Parties Most–Híd, Sloboda a Solidarita and Sme Rodina refused to participate in the project's financing, with the leader of Obyčajní Ľudia a Nezávislé Osobnosti, Igor Matovič, having stated that he would rather help other disabled people instead of Andrej Danko.
