= Stohl =

Stohl or Štohl is a surname. Notable people with this surname include:

- András Stohl (born 1967), Hungarian actor
- Bob Stohl, American new age and electronic musician in duo Emerald Web
- Eric Stohl, American politician
- Hank Stohl (1927-2008), American actor in American made-for-television horror film Satan's Triangle (1975) and Capricorn One (1977)
- Hollylynne Stohl, American mathematics and statistics educator
- Igor Štohl (born 1964), Slovak chess player
- Ján Štohl (1932–1993), Slovak astronomer, namesake of asteroid 3715 Štohl
- Manfred Stohl (born 1972), Austrian rally driver
- Margaret Stohl (born 1967), American novelist
- Michael Stohl (born 1947), American professor of communications
- Tamara Stohlová (born 1989), Slovak politician

== See also ==
- Stanley Stohl, fictional character in American television drama Chicago Med
