= Knapik =

Knapik is a Polish surname. Notable people with the name include:

- Eugeniusz Knapik (born 1951), Polish pianist and composer of classical music
- Frantisek Knapik (born 1956), the mayor of the Slovak city of Košice
- Michael Knapik (born 1963), American politician
- Renata Knapik-Miazga (born 1988), Polish épée fencer
- Robert Knapik (born 1970), aka Robbie Rage, American professional wrestler
- Tomasz Knapik (1943–2021), Polish film, radio and TV voice-over translation artist
- Wojciech Knapik (born 1980), Polish sport shooter
