= Lucia Plaváková =

Slovak lawyer and politician

Member of the National Council
- Incumbent
- Assumed office 25 October 2023

Personal details
- Born: 9 March 1984 (age 42) Bratislava, Czechoslovakia
- Party: Progressive Slovakia
- Children: 1
- Education: Comenius University

Lucia Plaváková (born 9 March 1984) is a Slovak politician and lawyer. Since 2023 she has been an MP of the National Council of Slovakia.

== Biography ==
Lucia Plaváková was born on 9 March 1984 in Bratislava. In 2007 she graduated in law from Comenius University.

She ran in the 2020 Slovak parliamentary election on the list of the Progressive Slovakia/SPOLU, which narrowly failed to pass the representation threshold. In 2023 Slovak parliamentary election she succeeded and became an MP.

Along with her fellow Progressive Slovakia MP Tomáš Hellebrandt, Plaváková is the third openly homosexual MP in Slovakia, after Edita Angyalová and Stanislav Fořt. She is active in promoting LGBT rights in her legal and political career.

Plaváková has one daughter.
