= Martin Dubéci =

Slovak politician

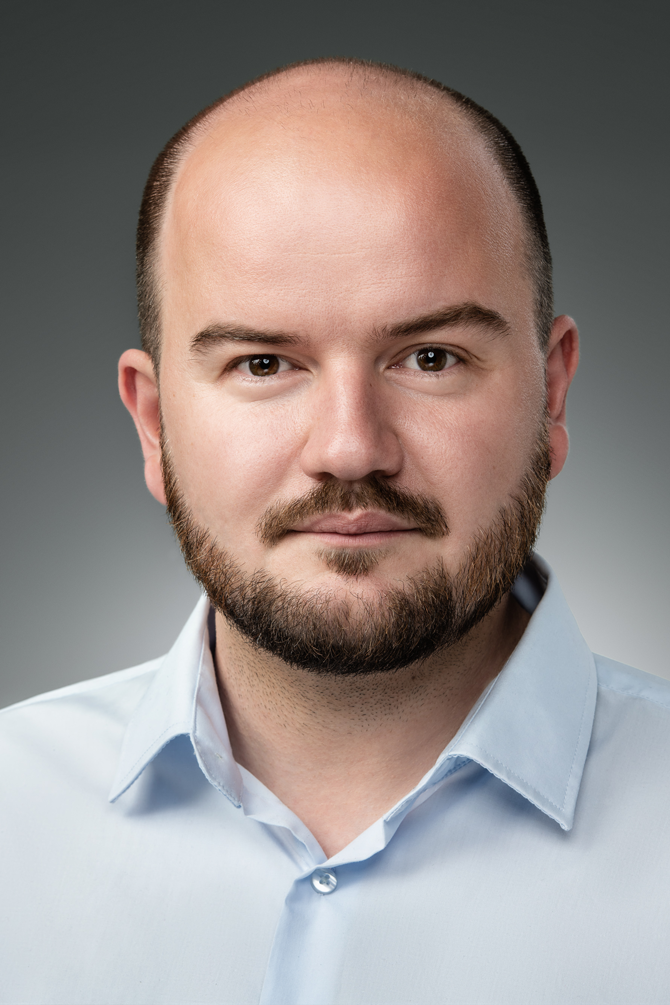

Deputy Speaker of the National Council
- Incumbent
- Assumed office 18 June 2025 Serving with Ľuboš Blaha, Peter Žiga and Tibor Gašpar
- Speaker: Richard Raši

Member of the National Council
- Incumbent
- Assumed office 25 October 2023

Personal details
- Born: 26 August 1986 (age 40) Košice, Czechoslovakia
- Party: Progressive Slovakia
- Other political affiliations: Network (2014–2015)
- Education: Masaryk University; London School of Economics

Martin Dubéci (born 26 August 1986) is a Slovak politician and member of Progressive Slovakia, who is serving as a deputy speaker of the National Council of Slovakia.

== Political career ==
From May 2012 to September 2013, Dubéci worked as an advisor to Erika Jurinová (OĽaNO), then-vice president of the National Council of the Slovak Republic. In October 2013, he became an assistant to then-member of Slovak Parliament Radoslav Procházka. As a parliamentary assistant, Dubéci had a contracted monthly salary of 2,000 Euros.

Dubéci worked as the head of Procházka's presidential campaign between July 2013 and May 2014, where was responsible for campaign transparency communications. When Procházka provided SME with a list of donors, in which a donation of 10,000 Euros from Andrej Zmeček was missing, Dubéci did not answer other questions about why Zmeček was not recognised as a donor earlier. On 3 June 2014, Procházka stated: "only my colleagues, including Martin Dubéci, knew about the money that went to the presidential campaign, but not through a transparent account until Monday."

In September 2015, Dubéci ended his work as member of Slovak Conservative Party, which he justified by its approach to solving the migration crisis. The following December, Dubéci received an award from Jana Dubovcová for creating a space for all who felt the need to express solidarity with refugees.

=== 2016 Slovak parliamentary election ===
Prior to the 2016 Slovak parliamentary election, Dubéci said that the approval of the anti-terrorist amendment to the Constitution of Slovakia by deputies of Smer-SD would not happen.

On the day of the election, Dubéci received 4,996 preferential votes on the candidate list of Most-Híd (2.94% of all votes of the Most-Híd party) and did not become a member of the National Council of the Slovak Republic, finishing 33rd place. As a result of reserving himself against disinformation, he also initiated "the Call to Humanity" signed by the public.

=== 2020 Slovak parliamentary election ===
During the 2020 Slovak parliamentary election, Dubéci ran in tenth place as a candidate of the PS/Spolu coalition. He received 4,138 votes in the election and was ranked 24th among the candidates after taking preferential votes into account. Due to the result of the coalition, Dubéci did not get into the parliament again.

Dubéci ran his first marathon in 3 hours and 27 minutes in 2021, then became general manager of the cultural center Tabačka Kulturfabrik one year later. During the 2023 Slovak parliamentary election, he ran for the 21st place among the candidates of the Progressive Slovakia party.

=== In the parliament ===
Dubéci successfully ran in the 2023 Slovak parliamentary election. After the election, he was the chair of the Progressive Slovakia fraction, until June 2025, when he was elected a deputy speaker of the National Council.
