= Ján Podmanický =

Slovak politician

Member of the National Council
- Incumbent
- Assumed office 4 July 2006

Personal details
- Born: 17 May 1977 (age 48) Stará Bystrica, Czechoslovakia
- Party: Direction – Social Democracy
- Other political affiliations: Life – National Party (2021–2022)
- Children: 3
- Education: Comenius University; Catholic University in Ružomberok

Ján Podmanický (born 17 May 1977) is a Slovak politician. He has served as a member of the National Council and Mayor of Stará Bystrica, respectively since 2003 and 2006.

== Biography ==
Podmanický studied Theology and Law at the Comenius University. He has three children.

== Political career ==
Podmanický has been a member of the Smer-SD party and the mayor of Stará Bystrica since 2002. He was first elected in the parliamentary election of the same year for the coalition HZD, HZDS, P-SNS, SNS, and Smer. Since 2006, Podmanický has been member of the National Council of Slovakia for Smer and became an independent politician from May 2020. He joined fellow MPs Marián Kéry and Tomáš Taraba to establish a Conservative Platform. Podmanický subsequently left Direction – Slovak Social Democracy, which he has been a member of since the beginning of his political career and became an independent politician. He justified his departure by his unwillingness to accept the leftward shift of the party ideology.
