= Martin Šmilňák =

Slovak politician (born 1973)

Member of the National Council
- In office 25 October 2023 – 30 January 2026

Personal details
- Born: 13 October 1973 (age 52) Bardejov, Czechoslovakia
- Party: Christian Democratic Movement
- Education: University of Prešov

Martin Šmilňák (born 13 October 1973) is a Slovak politician and educator. From 2023 to 2026 he served as a Member of the National Council of Slovakia.

== Biography ==
Martin Šmilňák was born on 13 October 1973 in Bardejov. He grew with three younger brothers in a religious household. In his youth, he was an athlete, competing in hurdles, pole vault, and decathlon. Šmilňák attended the gymnasium in Bardejov and then studied English and Physical Education at the University of Prešov. After graduation he worked as a teacher and later school principal of two Christian schools in Bardejov.

=== Political career ===
In the late 2000s, Šmilňák entered politics as a member of the Christian Democratic Movement (KDH). In the 2010 municipal elections, he ran for Mayor of Bardejov as a pro-European candidate, supported by a center-right coalition of conservative and liberal parties. He sought to unseat the long-serving incumbent, Boris Hanuščák, who was backed by a coalition of nationalist and left-wing forces. Šmilňák narrowly lost the election by a margin of 262 votes. In 2013, Šmilňák was elected to the Prešov Regional Assembly. He challenged Hanuščák for the mayoralty again in 2014, but was defeated by a wide margin of 3,223 votes. Following an unsuccessful bid for the National Council in 2020, Šmilňák also lost his seat in the regional assembly during the 2022 elections. However, in the 2023 parliamentary election, he successfully won a mandate to the National Council, running on the KDH party list.

On 28 December 2025, Šmilňák was involved in a traffic accident between the villages of Gaboltov and Sveržov after his vehicle collided with a deer. Although the accident resulted in no human injuries, a subsequent breathalyzer test detected blood alcohol. On 5 January 2026, Šmilňák announced his resignation from the National Council, stating he would take full political responsibility for the incident.
