= Marcela Čavojová =

Slovak politician (born 1973)

Member of the National Council of Slovakia
- Incumbent
- Assumed office 2023

Personal details
- Born: March 11, 1973 (age 52)
- Political party: Direction – Social Democracy

Marcela Čavojová (born March 11, 1973) is a Slovak politician who is a member of the National Council of Slovakia.

== See also ==
- List of members of the National Council of Slovakia, 2023–2027
