= Jaroslav Polaček =

Slovak politician

Mayor of Košice
- In office 10 December 2018 – 23 November 2026
- Preceded by: Richard Raši
- Succeeded by: Ladislav Lörinc

Personal details
- Born: 30 November 1976 (age 49) Košice, Czechoslovakia
- Party: Independent
- Education: Technical University of Košice

Jaroslav Polaček (born 30 November 1976) is a Slovak politician. He has served as the mayor of Košice, the second-largest city in Slovakia, since December 2018. He has also been a member of the Assembly of the Košice Self-Governing Region since 2017.

== Early life and career ==
Polaček was born in Košice. He graduated from the Faculty of Metallurgy of the Technical University of Košice in 2000. From 2002 to 2003 he worked as a research engineer at U. S. Steel Košice. Between 2003 and 2012 he worked for the waste-management company Fúra, becoming a partner in the firm in 2004. Since 2015 he has been co-owner of ODPADservis, a waste-management consultancy.

As chairman of the Union of Road Hauliers of Slovakia (UNAS), Polaček announced a nationwide strike of road hauliers in January 2010 in protest against the introduction of Slovakia's electronic road toll system.

== Political career ==
From 2010 to 2014, Polaček headed the municipal office of the Košice-Sever borough. In the 2014 municipal elections he was elected to both the Košice City Council and the Košice-Sever borough council, serving until 2018. As a city councillor, he was among the organisers of 2016 protests against the expansion of paid parking zones operated by the private company EEI. He has been a member of the Assembly of the Košice Self-Governing Region since 2017.

=== Mayor of Košice ===
In the November 2018 municipal elections, Polaček ran for mayor of Košice as an independent candidate supported by a coalition of centre-right parties (Freedom and Solidarity, Christian Democratic Movement, Party of the Hungarian Community, NOVA, Civic Conservative Party, Together and Progressive Slovakia). He won with 43.29% of the vote, succeeding Richard Raši.

He was re-elected in the 2022 municipal elections as the candidate of a broad coalition led by the Christian Democratic Movement and Freedom and Solidarity, receiving 20,561 votes (36.79%).

In June 2026, he announced his candidacy for a third term in the combined municipal and regional elections scheduled for 24 October 2026, running as an independent with the support of six political parties.

=== Tenure ===
Shortly after taking office, the city took over the administration of paid parking from the private operator EEI on 1 January 2019, leading to years of litigation over the validity of the company's 2012 lease agreement; following a ruling of the Košice Regional Court, the city became the sole operator of the parking system in 2022.

His tenure has seen major transport investments financed largely from European Union funds; according to the city administration, transport investments in 2026–2027 are to exceed €500 million. In June 2024, the widened four-lane Slanecká road (2.3 km) opened after three decades of discussions. A modernised maintenance depot of the city transport company (DPMK), replacing a facility dating from 1965, was completed in March 2026 at a cost of €57.7 million excluding VAT, of which €43 million came from EU funds. The largest ongoing project is the second stage of tram track modernisation (MET 2) in the Nad jazerom district, approximately seven kilometres at a contracted price of about €66.5 million.

In sports infrastructure, the Košice Football Arena and a national training centre for tennis and badminton opened in 2024, followed in 2025 by the National Olympic Centre of Aquatic Sports, a €19.7 million reconstruction of the municipal swimming pool that made it the only indoor pool in Slovakia meeting Olympic parameters. The Košice Football Arena won the main prize in the engineering structures category of Slovakia's Building of the Year 2024 awards, and the National Olympic Centre of Aquatic Sports was named Building of the Year 2025.

In June 2025, the city council approved a new master plan (územný plán) for Košice, the first since 1976; it took effect on 1 September 2025. Under a state-supported rental housing scheme, approximately 5,400 rental apartments are planned in Košice over the following decade; in 2025 the city council approved a joint venture with the Austrian investor WBG Wohnen und Bauen (with the city holding 15%), with construction of the first phase of about 750 apartments scheduled to begin in autumn 2026.

In July 2026, Košice was shortlisted among five finalists for the European Green Capital 2028 title.

=== Criticism ===
Media have repeatedly reported on tense relations between the city administration and the mayors of Košice's boroughs, particularly over their financing, as well as on a long-running dispute with Rastislav Trnka, chairman of the Košice Self-Governing Region. In 2024, he was criticised by Transparency International Slovakia and by his predecessor Richard Raši for placing his own beehives on the roof of the city hall without a public tender.

== Other positions ==
Polaček chairs the Cooperation Council for Sustainable Urban Development (UMR) of the Košice functional urban area, which allocates European Regional Development Fund investments (€133.8 million under the Slovakia Programme) among the city and 40 surrounding municipalities. He is also a member of the leadership of the ice hockey club HC Košice, a supervisory board member of the regional integrated transport company IDS Východ, and second vice-president of the Košická aréna association, which manages the Steel Aréna.

== Personal life ==
Polaček has one child. He is a long-term voluntary blood donor; in February 2024 he completed his 40th donation, for which he was awarded the Golden Jánský Medal.
