= Róbert Madej =

Slovak lawyer and politician

Member of the National Council
- In office 15 October 2002 – 20 March 2020

Personal details
- Born: 3 January 1981 (age 45) Zvolen, Czechoslovakia (now Slovakia)
- Party: Direction – Slovak Social Democracy
- Education: Comenius University; Pavol Jozef Šafárik University

Róbert Madej (born 3 January 1981 in Zvolen) is a Slovak attorney and former politician, who served as a member of the National Council from 2002 to 2020.

Madej studied law at the Comenius University, graduating in 2004. Already as a student, he was included on the electoral list of the Direction – Slovak Social Democracy party in 2002 following his victory in student essay competition organized by the party along with a fellow winner Edita Angyalová. In 2013 he received his PhD in law from Pavol Jozef Šafárik University. In 2002 Slovak parliamentary election, he was elected an MP at the age of 22. In 2020 he retired from politics to focus on the legal practice and family.
