= Stakčín =

- Municipality
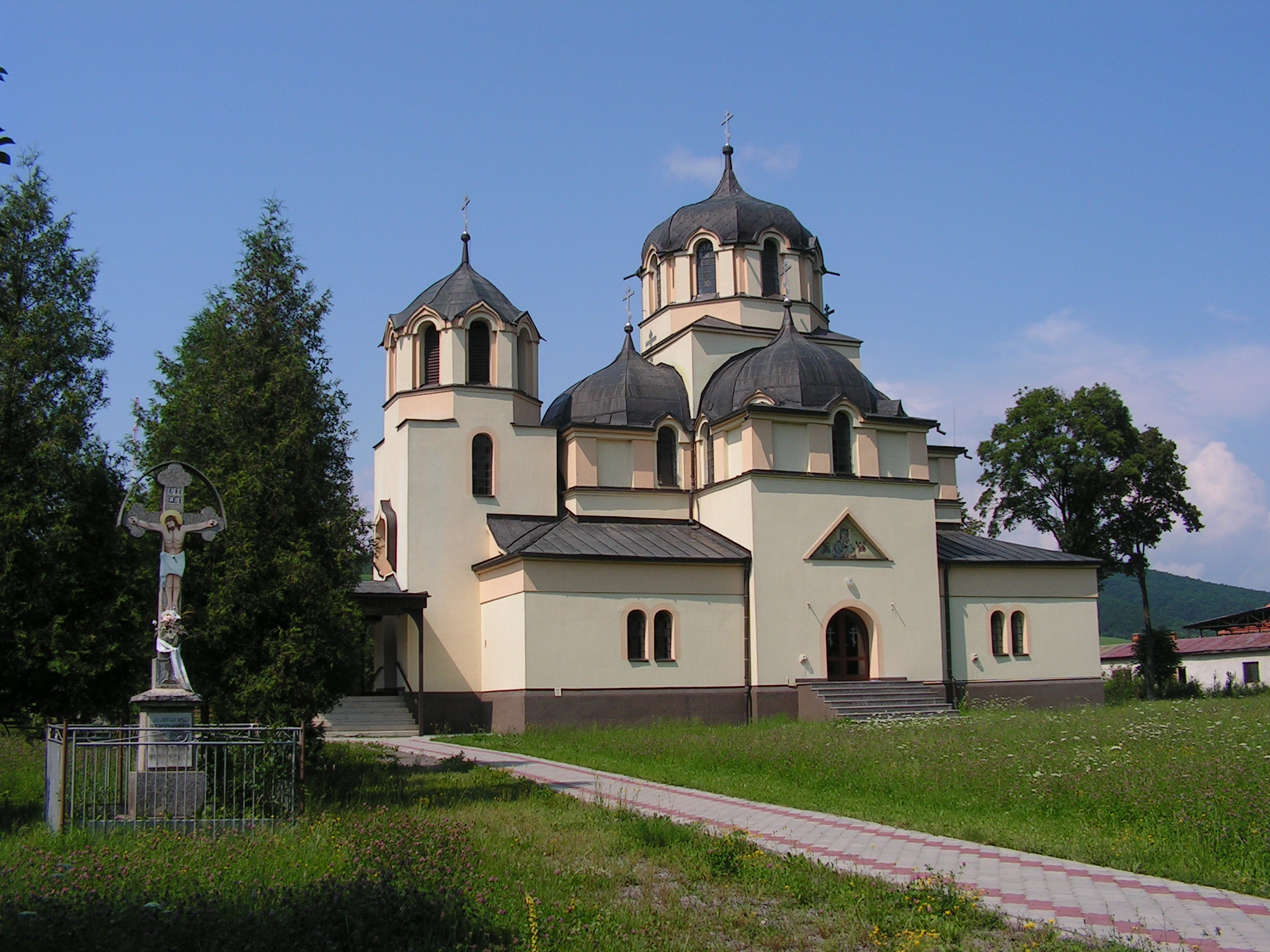
- Orthodox church of the Holy Trinity

- Flag

- Location of Stakčín in the Prešov Region Location of Stakčín in Slovakia
- Coordinates: 49.00°N 22.24°E
- Country: Slovakia
- Region: Prešov Region
- District: Snina District
- First mentioned: 1567

Area
  - Total: 167.66 km^{2} (64.73 sq mi)
- Elevation: 252 m (827 ft)

Population (2025)
  - Total: 2,330
- Time zone: UTC+1 (CET)
  - Summer (DST): UTC+2 (CEST)
- Postal code: 676 1
- Area code: +421 57
- Vehicle registration plate (until 2022): SV
- Website: stakcin.eu

Stakčín (Hungarian: Takcsány, Rusyn: Стащін) is a larger village and a municipality in Snina District in the Prešov Region of north-eastern Slovakia.

== Geography ==
The municipality lies at an altitude of 252 metres (827 ft) and covers an area of 167.66 km^{2} (64.73 sq mi) (2025). It lies between the Vihorlat and Bukovské vrchy mountains. The municipality is the seat of the Poloniny National Park governing body.

== History ==
In historical records the village was first mentioned in 1492 as Staccyn. Before the establishment of independent Czechoslovakia in 1918, Stakčín was part of Zemplén County within the Kingdom of Hungary. In 1939, it was for a short time part of the Slovak Republic. The area was a battleground in the Slovak-Hungarian War of 1939, as a result of which it again became part of Hungary. On 24 November 1944, the Red Army entered Stakčín and it was once again part of Czechoslovakia.

== Population ==
Population statistic (10 years)
Year	1995	2005	2015	2025
Count	2496	2374	2439	2330
Difference		−4.88%	+2.73%	−4.46%

Population statistic
Year	2024	2025
Count	2351	2330
Difference		−0.89%

It has a population of 2330 people (31 December 2025).

=== Ethnicity ===
Census 2021 (1+ %)
Ethnicity	Number	Fraction
Slovak	1910	79.81%
Rusyn	910	38.02%
Not found out	137	5.72%
Romani	93	3.88%
Ukrainian	44	1.83%
Total	2393	

In year 2021 was 2393 people by ethnicity 1910 as Slovak, 910 as Rusyn, 137 as Not found out, 93 as Romani, 44 as Ukrainian, 12 as Czech, 6 as Other, 4 as Polish, 2 as Russian, 2 as Hungarian and 1 as Bulgarian.

Note on population: The difference values of population numbers in the table "Population statistic" and in the sections "Ethnicity" & "Religion" is caused by the use of various statistical methods.

=== Religion ===
Census 2021 (1+ %)
Religion	Number	Fraction
Eastern Orthodox Church	1450	60.59%
Roman Catholic Church	349	14.58%
Greek Catholic Church	287	11.99%
None	164	6.85%
Not found out	123	5.14%
Total	2393	

In year 2021 was 2393 people by religion 1450 from Eastern Orthodox Church, 349 from Roman Catholic Church, 287 from Greek Catholic Church, 164 from None, 123 from Not found out, 5 from Jehovah's Witnesses, 2 from Calvinist Church, 2 from Paganism and natural spirituality, 2 from Other and not ascertained christian church, 2 from Other, 1 from Old Catholic Church, 1 from Christian Congregations in Slovakia, 1 from Islam, 1 from Evangelical Church, 1 from Czechoslovak Hussite Church, 1 from Apostolic Church and 1 from Ad hoc movements.

== Twin towns – sister cities ==
Stakčín is twinned with:

- Lutowiska, Poland
- Slavonice, Czech Republic

== Notable people ==
- Zuzana Mesterová (born 1989), politician
