= Samuel Migaľ =

Slovak politician (born 1982)

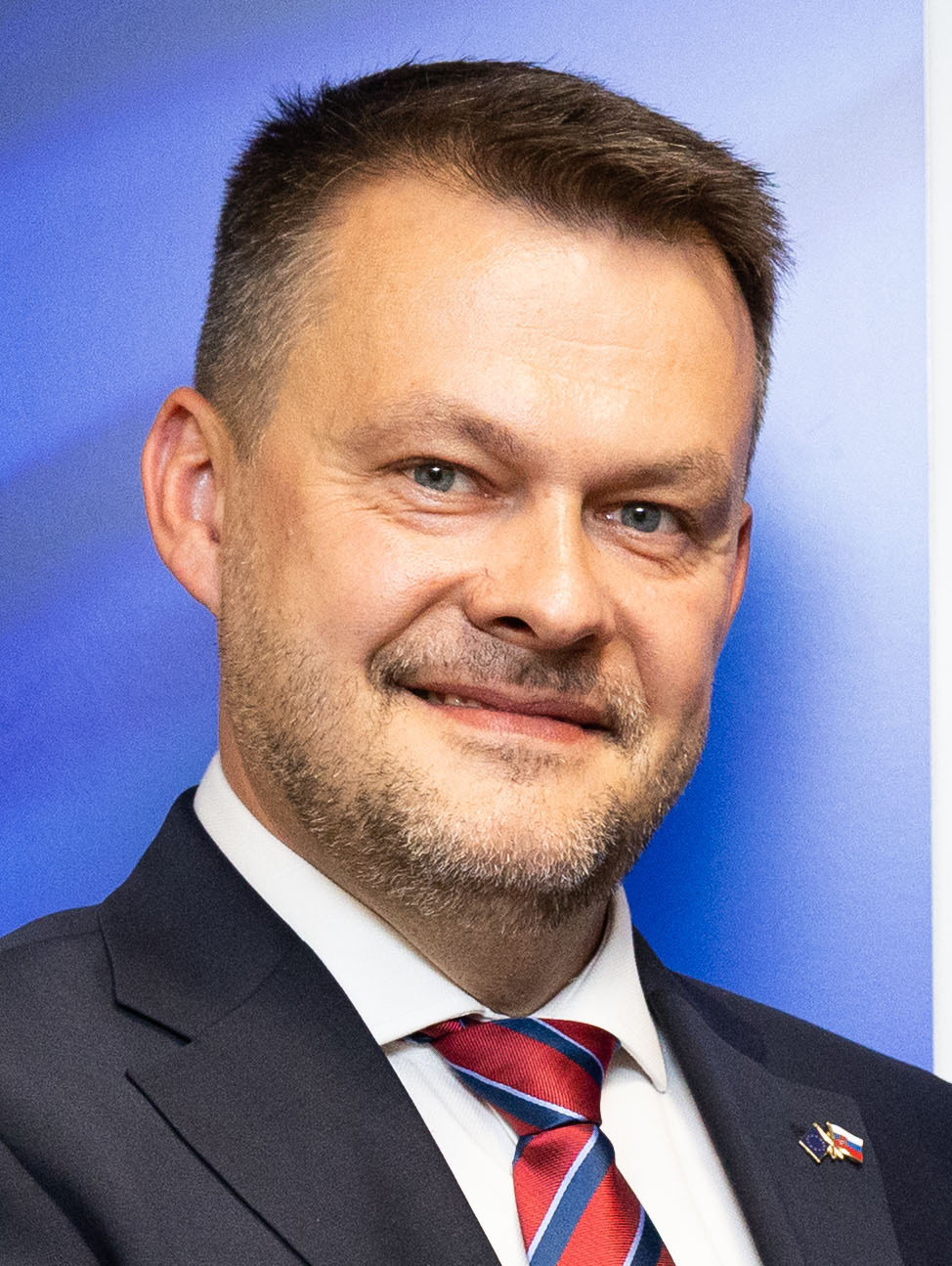
- Migaľ in 2025

Minister of Investments, Regional Development and Informatization
- Incumbent
- Assumed office 19 March 2025
- Prime Minister: Robert Fico
- Preceded by: Richard Raši

Member of the National Council
- In office 25 October 2023 – 19 March 2025

Personal details
- Born: 30 June 1982 (age 44) Košice, Czechoslovakia
- Party: Voice – Social Democracy (2023–2025)
- Education: University of Ss. Cyril and Methodius

Samuel Migaľ (born 30 June 1982) is a Slovak politician and former TV host who has served as the minister of Investment, Regional Development and Informatics of Slovakia since 2025.

== Biography ==
Migaľ was born on 30 June 1982 in Košice. He attended a forestry trade school in Vranov nad Topľou and afterwards studied media communication at the University of Ss. Cyril and Methodius, graduating in 2010. From 2004 to 2023 he worked as a news reporter for TV JOJ. In October 2023, Migaľ revealed in an interview with the Slovak daily SME that he was among the journalists whose personal information was found on a USB flash drive belonging to Marián Kočner, the businessman indicted in connection with numerous crimes.

Migaľ became MP soon after the 2023 Slovak parliamentary election a replacement for Denisa Saková. In 2024, he joined forces with fellow Voice – Social Democracy MP Ján Ferenčák, Radomír Šalitroš and Roman Malatinec to demand resignation of the parliamentary leader of the party Róbert Puci and government reshuffle. In reaction, Migaľ and Šalitroš were expelled from the party in January 2025.

In March 2025, Migaľ ended his feud with the governing coalition in exchange for becoming the minister of regional development.
