= Life – National Party =

National conservative political party in Slovakia

Life – National Party Život – národná strana
- Chairman: Tibor Pénzeš
- Founded: 4 February 2019
- Split from: Christian Democratic Movement
- Headquarters: Staromestská 595/6/D, Bratislava
- Membership (2022): ▲146
- Ideology: Christian right; Christian nationalism; National conservatism; Social conservatism; Anti-abortion
- Political position: Far-right
- National affiliation: Slovak National Party (2023–)
- Colours: Blue Red
- National Council: 0 / 150
- European Parliament: 0 / 15

Website
- strana-zivot.sk

Life – National Party (Slovak: Život – národná strana, Život), formerly known as Christian Democracy – Life and Prosperity – Alliance for Slovakia (Slovak: Kresťanská demokracia – Život a prosperita – Aliancia za Slovensko, KDŽP), is a far-right Christian political party in Slovakia.

== History ==
Logo of KDŽP before 2021

The split between the Christian Democratic Movement (KDH) and the KDŽP was sparked by a dispute between the presidency of the party and its member Peter Molda. Molda wanted the right to life to be a condition for any future KDH participation in government, a move which was not permitted by the more liberal presidency of the KDH. On the 26 April 2018, Molda attacked this move on Conservative Daily Postoj, a conservative website founded after the 2015 Slovak same-sex marriage referendum, stating "I am amazed that it is said on Christian soil that we will conclude the status quo with the Liberals again" and emphasising that the KDH should be focused on "the question of life". Alojz Hlina, the president of the KDH, criticised Molda's article on 12 May, with Molda announcing his intent to form a new party the same day.

Alongside Tibor Pénzeš (former assistant deputy of the National Council of the Slovak Republic), Pavol Abrhan (former member of the National Council of the Slovak Republic) and Miroslav Vetrík, Molda began collecting the 10,000 signatures needed to register the party. By 16 January 2019, they had collected over 14,000 signatures, meaning that the party was officially registered on 4 February.

In September 2019, KDŽP and the Slovak National Party entered into a cooperation agreement, signing a memorandum concerning "Life and Homeland". They also expressed their support for March for Life, an anti-abortion event in Slovakia. Their first contested national election was the 2020 parliamentary election, in which 3 candidates were elected on joint tickets with the neo-nazi People's Party Our Slovakia (L'SNS). However, on 27 May 2020, all three members left the ĽSNS parliamentary club due to a dispute with ĽSNS National Council member Milan Mazurek.

In February 2021, the party was renamed from KDŽP to Life - National Party.

In April 2023, the party's former chairperson, Tomáš Taraba, and other prominent members of the party reached an agreement with Andrej Danko to run on the list of the Slovak National Party for the September 2023 elections.

== Ideology ==
The ideology of the party is based around a fundamentalist, far right understanding of Christianity. The party advocates for a ban on abortions, fights against LGBT+ rights, sexual education, and transgender care, while also advocating for an increased support for families with children and financial assistance to the elderly. It also calls for increased environmental protections and the introduction of language lessons to schools. In its position on the European Union (EU), the party criticizes the promotion of "gender ideology" and declares that it will "promote the return of the EU to its original mission".

The party was described as far right or fascist by mainstream media and political scientists, however this was disputed by others, such as the liberal-leaning National Council MP Martin Klus, who has since decided to run on the list of the national-conservative Sme Rodina party.

== List of party presidents ==
No.	President	Term start	Term end
1	Štefan Kuffa	15 February 2019	20 November 2019
2	Tomáš Taraba	20 November 2019	30 June 2023
3	Tibor Pénzeš	30 June 2023	Incumbent

Source: MINV
