= Zuzana Mesterová =

Slovak politician (born 1989)

Member of the National Council
- Incumbent
- Assumed office 25 October 2023

Personal details
- Born: 5 October 1989 (age 37) Stakčín, Czechoslovakia
- Party: Progressive Slovakia
- Education: Pavol Jozef Šafárik University

Zuzana Mesterová (born 5 October 1989) is a Slovak politician. She has served as a Member of the National Council of Slovakia for the Progressive Slovakia party since 2023.

== Biography ==
Zuzana Mesterová was born on 5 October 1989 in Stakčín. She studied law at the Pavol Jozef Šafárik University.

After graduation, she worked as a lawyer for public housing enterprise in Košice. She left after a conflict with the management of the company.

In the 2023 Slovak parliamentary election she successfully ran on the election list of the Progressive Slovakia party.
