= Štefan Kuffa =

Slovak politician

State Secretary at the Ministry of Environment
- Incumbent
- Assumed office 29 November 2023

State Secretary at the Ministry of Culture
- In office 25 October 2023 – 29 November 2023

Member of the Slovak National Council
- In office 20 March 2020 – 25 October 2023
- In office 4 April 2012 – 23 March 2016

Personal details
- Born: 1 December 1961 (age 64) Kežmarok, Czechoslovakia
- Party: Life – National Party
- Children: 8
- Education: University of Prešov

Štefan Kuffa (born 31 December 1961) is a Slovak politician who serves as the State Secretary at the Ministry of Environment. From 2012 to 2016 and again from 2020 to 23 served as a Member of the National Council.

== Early life ==
Kuffa was born on 31 December 1961 in Kežmarok. His brother is the priest Marián Kuffa, who is known for his charitable activities and hardline conservative opinions. He studied at the University of Prešov. Before joining politics, Kuffa worked for public employment service. From 2004 to 2020, he was the director of the Hospice of Saint Elisabeth of Hungary in Ľubica.

== Political career ==
Kuffa first became politically active in 2016, when he was elected to the parliament on the list of the Ordinary People and Independent Personalities (OĽaNO) party. As an MP Kuffa was chiefly focused on attempting to restrict access to abortion and criminalizing abortion and IVF providers. In addition he became notorious for proposing controversial laws, such as a regulation of children toys "that resemble vampires" or a ban of the use of petrol lawn movers on Sundays. He also proposed that politicians who reside far from the capital should be excused from parliament deliberations on Friday after 1pm in order for them to be able to travel home for the weekend.

In November 2015, Kuffa was accused of physical alteration with a local elderly women, who was protesting the plans of his son, Michal, to build a house in the village of Pavľany without a construction permit. Kuffa claimed it was in fact the 79 years old woman who slapped him without provocation and announced he would press charges for assault of a public official. In response to the conflict, the leader of OĽaNO Igor Matovič criticized Kuffa for abusing the position of MP to advance his private agenda and banned Kuffa from running on the party list in the next elections.

Following the end of cooperation with OĽaNO, Kuffa briefly joined the Christian Democratic Movement. However, the party leadership refused to include him on the election list and subsequently he left to establish a new party Life – National Party. The party competed in the 2020 Slovak parliamentary election on the list of the extreme-right People's Party Our Slovakia and Kuffa again became an MP. Nonetheless, just three months after the election the Life politicians, including Kuffa, disassociated themselves with the People's Party due to its extremist views. In a similar fashion to his first term as an MP, Kuffa represented conservative legal agenda, in particular with regards to abortion and LGBT rights, arguing homosexuality is an illness similar to HIV.

In July 2021, Kuffa and his sons Filip and Štefan were accused by their neighbors of taking over their land using fraudulent legal claims, as well as using physical violence and murder threats against the neighbors to bully them into giving up their land. Once again, Kuffa claimed he was the victim of violence.

In 2023 Slovak parliamentary election, Life party successfully ran on the list of the Slovak National Party. Following the election he became a State Secretary at the Ministry of Culture. Later that November, Kuffa gave at a mass in the Saint Nicolas Church at Trnava. In his speech, Kuffa announced the ministry of culture will stop the "gender ideology", criticized the use of vaccines, and proposed declaring Jesus Christ the king of Slovakia with the presence of the entire government and church leadership. The speech attracted widespread condemnation from the opposition politician, accusing Kuffa of undermining the secular nature of the state. The liberal theologian Samuel Jezný called Kuffa's speech "an advertisement for atheism". The Conference of Slovak Bishops likewise criticized the speech, stressing that churches should be places devoted to prayers and "divisive political rhetoric" does not belong there. The culture minister Martina Šimkovičová said the proposal is a private activity of Kuffa and does not have the endorsement of the ministry.

On 29 November 2023 Kuffa was reassigned from the Ministry of Culture to the Ministry of Environment.

In August 2024, Kuffa interrupted the play Little Gem performed by the actresses of the National Theatre Košice at a festival in the Malá Franková village. Kuffa, who was present in the audience, interrupted the play by loudly demanding that children are not allowed to continue watching the "perverted" play. His behavior was met with loud condemnation of the theatre members and other spectators as well as subsequent calls from the opposition from his resignation.

== Personal life ==
Kuffa is married with eight children and seventeen grandchildren.
