= Richard Raši =

Slovak physician and politician

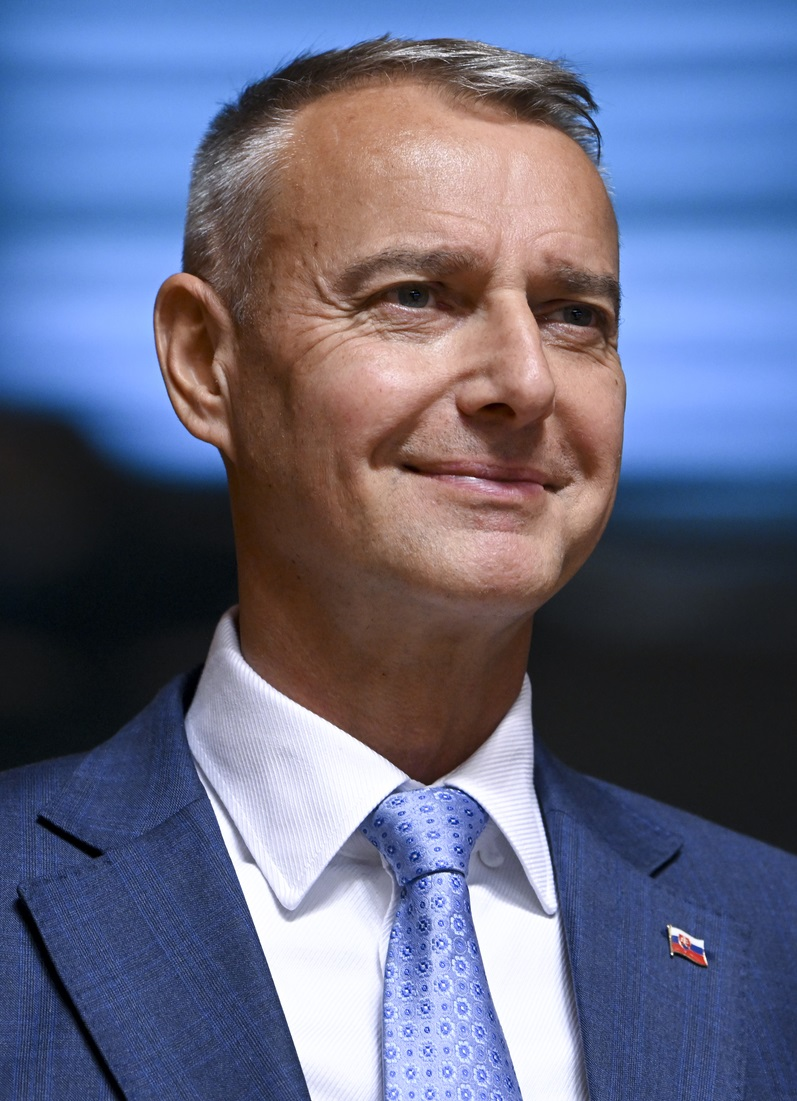
- Raši in 2024

Speaker of the National Council
- Incumbent
- Assumed office 26 March 2025
- President: Peter Pellegrini
- Deputy: See list: Andrej Danko; Tibor Gašpar; Peter Žiga
- Preceded by: Peter Žiga (acting)

Member of the National Council
- Incumbent
- Assumed office 25 March 2025
- In office 21 March 2020 – 25 October 2023
- In office 8 July 2010 – 22 March 2018

Minister of Investments, Regional Development and Informatization
- In office 25 October 2023 – 19 March 2025
- Prime Minister: Robert Fico
- Preceded by: Peter Balík
- Succeeded by: Samuel Migaľ

Deputy Prime Minister of Slovakia for Investments and Informatization
- In office 22 March 2018 – 21 March 2020
- Prime Minister: Peter Pellegrini
- Preceded by: Peter Pellegrini
- Succeeded by: Veronika Remišová

Minister of Health
- In office 3 June 2008 – 8 June 2010
- Prime Minister: Robert Fico
- Preceded by: Ivan Valentovič
- Succeeded by: Ivan Uhliarik

Mayor of Košice
- In office 21 December 2010 – 22 March 2018
- Preceded by: František Knapík
- Succeeded by: Jaroslav Polaček

Personal details
- Born: 2 April 1971 (age 55) Košice, Czechoslovakia
- Party: Voice – Social Democracy (since 2020)
- Other political affiliations: Direction – Social Democracy (until 2020)
- Children: 3
- Education: University of Pavol Jozef Šafárik

Richard Raši (born 2 April 1971) is a Slovak physician and politician who served as Slovakia's Deputy Prime Minister for Investments and Information. A member of the Voice – Social Democracy (Slovak: Hlas – sociálna demokracia) political party, Raši previously served as Mayor of the city of Košice. He also served from 3 June 2008 until 8 June 2010 as Minister of Health in the First cabinet of Robert Fico. On 26 March 2025, he assumed the Speaker of the National Council role succeeding Peter Žiga.

== Early life and education ==
Born 2 April 1971 in Kosice, Raši studied medicine at the Medical faculty at the University of Pavol Jozef Šafárik from 1989, receiving his medical degree in 1995. After specializing as a trauma surgeon, he received his master's degree in the field of public health at the Slovak Medical University in 2004. Raši received his PhD degree in the same field at Technical University of Košice six years later.

== Career ==
Immediately after graduation, Raši started work as a trauma surgeon intern at the University Hospital of L. Pasteur in Kosice. By 2004, he had been promoted to Vice-director of that hospitals clinic of traumatology. From 2007 he worked as the head of the Bratislava Faculty Hospital, until 2008, when he was appointed Minister of Health. In between the years, Rasi spent several months on internships abroad, working in the United States, Sweden and Switzerland among others.

=== Minister of Health ===
Raši was appointed as Minister of Health on 3 June 2008, by president Ivan Gasparovic. This happened the same day as his predecessor Ivan Valentovič resigned. Valentovič had long been under severe pressure to resign over his handling of the controversial health insurance reform as well as the general state of the Slovak health system. Robert Fico sacked Raši due to their strained relationships, but rejected it.

After Raši assumed the post, he inherited a department under heavy public scrutiny, and was criticized for his lack of political experience. Opposition MP Viliam Novotny from the Slovak Democratic and Christian Union – Democratic Party called him a "puppet in the hands of Fico and Paska", referring to prime minister Fico, and the speaker of parliament Pavol Paska, both senior figures within the Smer-SD party.

During Raši's two-year tenure as minister he set out on continuing his predecessors attempt to reform the country's health insurance sector. He also launched a campaign of aggressive legislation aimed at improving the public health. One example being increasing taxes on products with high amounts of sugar, or otherwise unhealthy products.

=== Member of Parliament ===
While serving as government minister of health, he also stood as Smer-SD's candidate for a parliamentary seat in the 2010 Slovak parliamentary election. In a fortunate turn of events, he ended up gaining the seat but lost the ministers post due to Smer-SD losing the election.

=== Mayor of Košice ===
In September 2009, it was announced that Smer-SD would place Raši on the party's ticket for the upcoming mayoral election in Košice. This was despite the fact that they in April had confirmed that another politician, Ladislav Lazar would be the party's choice. However, the increasingly popular Raši had since eclipsed Lazar. Prime Minister Robert Fico confirmed his choice of Raši saying that "We are looking for strong candidates that can win elections, therefore we are giving people from the executive branch a chance".

In what was to be the closest election in Košice in over 20 years, Raši eventually won with 36% of the vote, 4 percent ahead of the runner-up, incumbent mayor František Knapík who received 32%. The turnout however, was surprisingly low, at 33%. He resigned as mayor on 26 March 2018 after being appointed deputy prime minister. He was succeeded by Deputy Mayor Martin Petruško in an acting capacity.

=== Deputy Prime Minister ===
Raši was appointed Deputy Prime Minister for Investments and Information upon the ascension of Peter Pellegrini to the office of Prime Minister in March 2018. He was approved by the National Council on 26 March 2018 along with the rest of the new cabinet.

=== Minister of Investments, Regional Development and Informatization ===
On 25 October 2023, he assumed the Minister of Investments, Regional Development and Informatization role in the fourth cabinet of Robert Fico. He resigned on 19 March 2025 and was succeeded by Samuel Migaľ. On 26 March 2025, after 353 days of vacancy in the Office , he was elected as Speaker of the National Council succeeding Peter Žiga, the incumbent Deputy Speaker.

== Personal life ==
Raši lives in Košice with his wife and three daughters. He enjoys hiking and sports.

Political offices
Preceded by Ivan Valentovič	Minister of Health of Slovakia; 2008–2010	Succeeded by Ivan Uhliarik
Preceded by František Knapík	Mayor of Košice; 2010–2018	Succeeded by Martin Petruško; Acting
Preceded by Peter Pellegrini	Deputy Prime Minister for Investments and Information; 2018–2020	Succeeded by Veronika Remišová
