= Tina Gažovičová =

Slovak politician (born 1986)

Member of the Slovak National Council
- Incumbent
- Assumed office 25 October 2023

Personal details
- Born: Tina Gyárfášová; 22 December 1986 (age 39) Bratislava, Czechoslovakia
- Party: Progressive Slovakia
- Spouse: Ondrej Gažovič
- Children: 2
- Education: Masaryk University; Comenius University

Tina Gažovičová (née Gyárfášová, born 22 December 1986) is a Slovak politician. Since 2023 she has been a member of the National Council of Slovakia.

== Early life ==
Gažovičová was born on 22 December 1986 in Bratislava. Her mother, Oľga Gyarfášová was a professor of sociology. She grew up partly in Bratislava and partly in Vienna. In 2008 she graduated in sociology at the Masaryk University. In 2014 she obtained a PhD in public policy at the Comenius University.

== Career ==
Following graduation, Gažovičová worked as a researcher in various NGOs in Slovakia as well as in Berlin. In 2020 she joined the Ministry of Education as an expert on inclusive education. In the 2023 Slovak parliamentary election she won a seat in the National Council on the list of the Progressive Slovakia party.

== Personal life ==
Gažovičová is married to Ondrej Gažovič, a former diplomat. They have two sons together.
