= Jana Vaľová =

Slovak politician

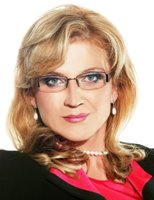
Jana Vaľová

Jana Vaľová (born 8 July 1965) is a politician of the Slovak Republic. She has been a member of the National Council of the Slovak Republic, a district chairperson of the social-democratic political party Direction – Social Democracy, and Mayor of Humenné.

== Education ==
Vaľová received a general certificate of secondary education from the Medzilaborce agricultural technical secondary school. In 2008, V received a master's degree from the Faculty of Health and Social Sciences at the University of Trnava. She received a rigorous degree in social work from the St. Elizabeth University of Health and Social Sciences in Bratislava in 2010. She speaks both English and Russian.

== Career ==
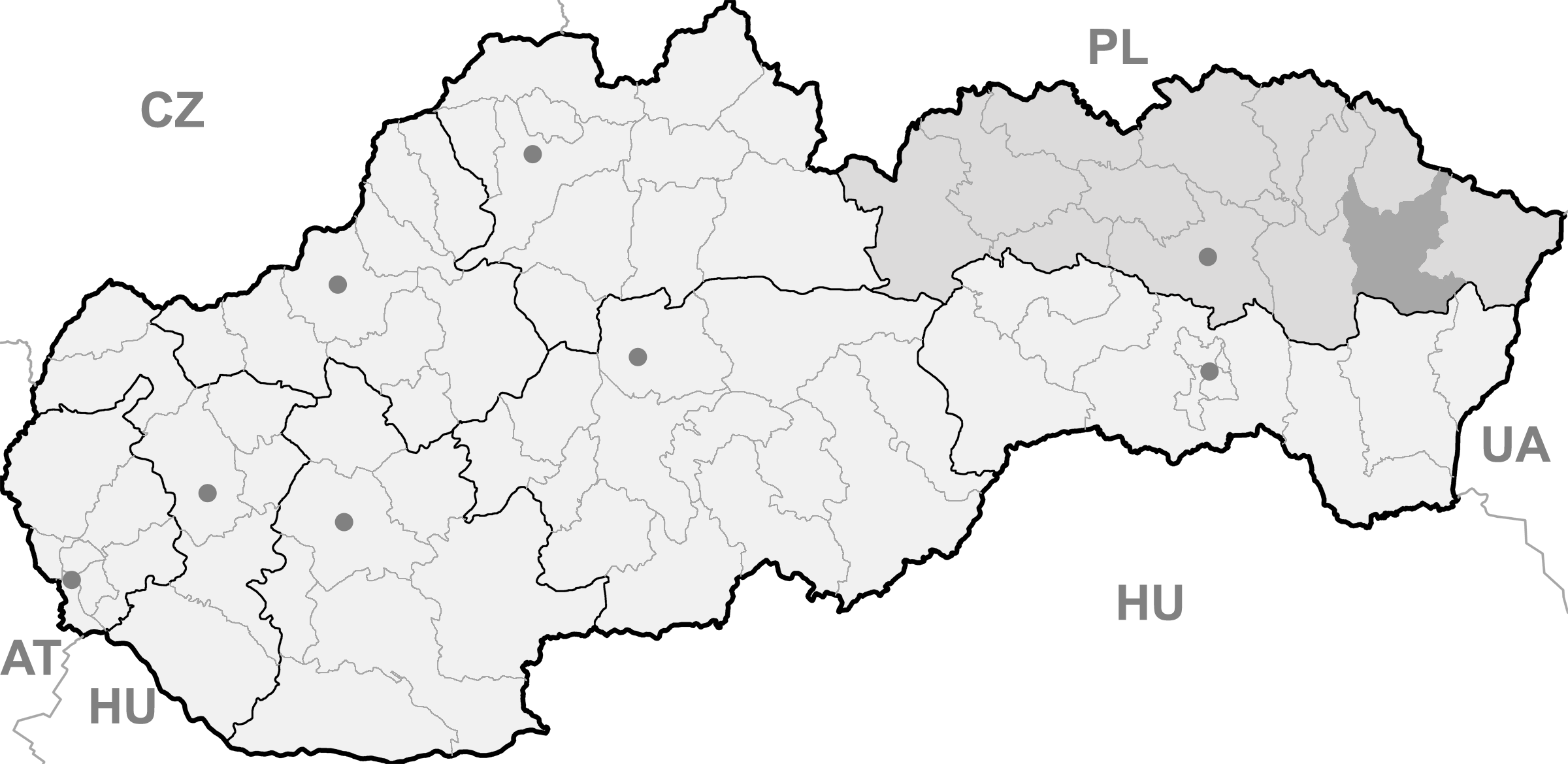
Humenne township in Presov region, Slovak republic

=== Prešov self governing region (PSR) ===
In 2000, Vaľová entered politics, becoming a member and district chairperson of the Smer SD party. In 2005, she was elected a member of parliament in Prešov. Vaľová became president of the 'Committee of Culture and Ethnic Minorities'. In 2009, Vaľová was reelected as MP in the PSR. She served as vice president of the 'Committee of Culture and Ethnic Minorities'.

=== Slovak republic ===
From 2006 to 2012, Vaľová was thrice elected to the National Council of the Slovak Republic. She worked on the 'Committee on Social Affairs and Housing'; the 'Evaluation Committee of the Council of Ministers for the Prevention and Control of Drug Addiction'; the 'Committee for European Affairs' (as a result of winning the PSR); and the 'Council for Gender Equality'.

=== Humenné ===
Concurrently, in 2010, in municipal elections Vaľová was elected mayor of Humenné by a coalition of Smer-SD, HZDS, SNS, Strana zelených (the Green Party), Úsvit, Slobodné Fórum and Nová demokracia (New Democracy).
