= Peter Žiga =

Slovak politician

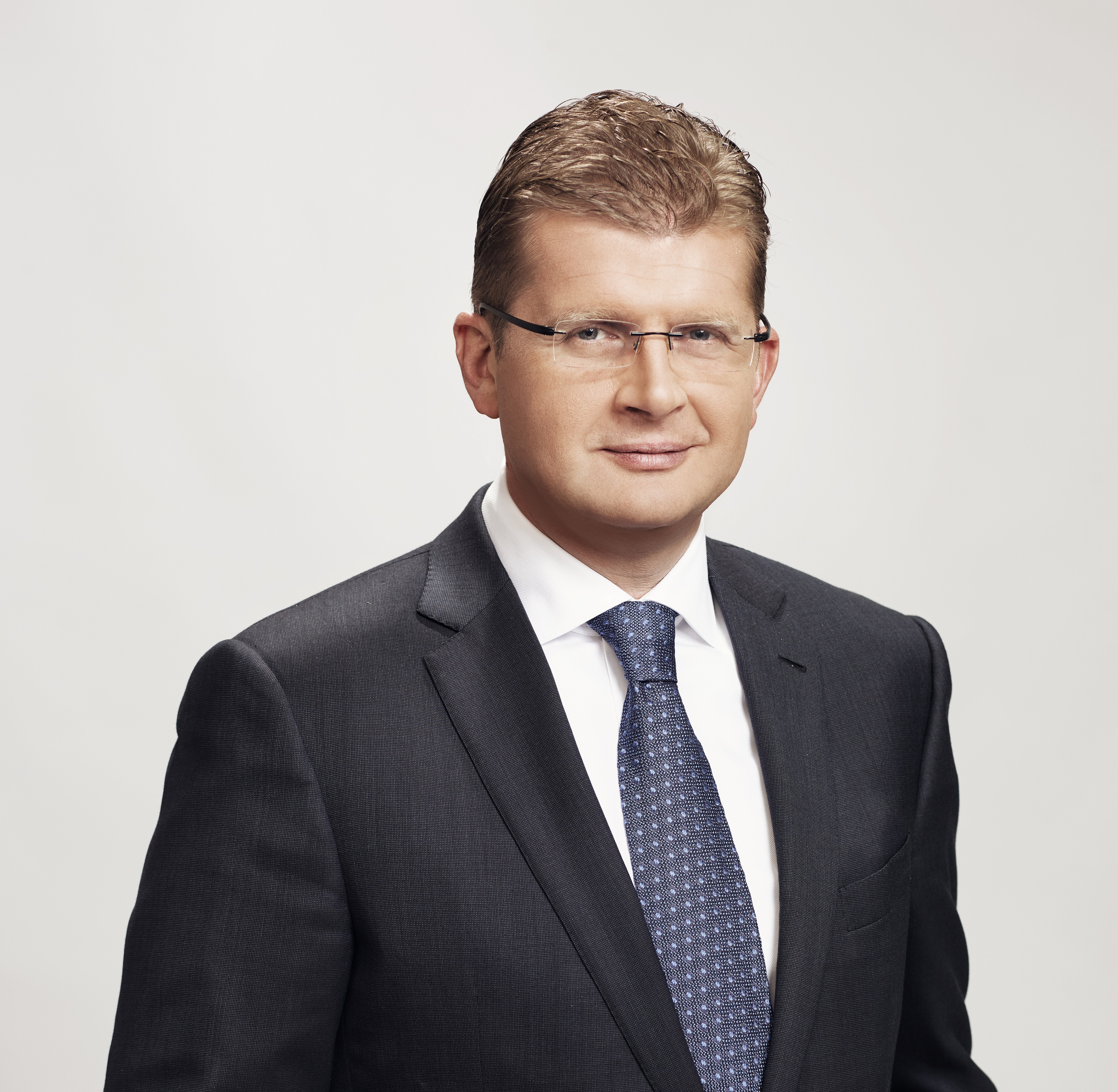
- Official portrait, 2015

Speaker of the National Council
- Acting; 7 April 2024 – 26 March 2025
- President: Zuzana Čaputová; Peter Pellegrini
- Preceded by: Peter Pellegrini
- Succeeded by: Richard Raši

Deputy Speaker of the National Council
- Incumbent
- Assumed office 25 October 2023 Serving with Andrej Danko, Michal Šimečka, Ľuboš Blaha, Tibor Gašpar and Martin Dubéci
- Speaker: Peter Pellegrini; Richard Raši

Member of the National Council
- Incumbent
- Assumed office 21 March 2020
- In office 8 July 2010 – 4 April 2012

Minister of Economy
- In office 23 March 2016 – 21 March 2020
- Prime Minister: Robert Fico; Peter Pellegrini
- Preceded by: Vazil Hudák
- Succeeded by: Richard Sulík

Minister of Environment
- In office 4 April 2012 – 23 March 2016
- Prime Minister: Robert Fico
- Preceded by: József Nagy
- Succeeded by: László Sólymos

Undersecretary of Economy
- In office 19 July 2006 – 8 July 2010
- Minister: Ľubomír Jahnátek

Personal details
- Born: 27 July 1972 (age 53) Košice, Czechoslovakia (now Slovakia)
- Party: Voice – Social Democracy (since 2020)
- Other political affiliations: Direction – Social Democracy (until 2020)
- Spouse: Renáta Žigová
- Children: 2
- Education: University of Economics in Bratislava

Peter Žiga (born 27 July 1972) is a Slovak politician and businessman, a member of the National Council for Voice – Social Democracy (Hlas-SD), and previously Direction – Social Democracy (SMER-SD). He was formerly Minister of the Environment (2012–2016) and Minister of the Economy (2016–2020) of Slovakia.

== Early life and education ==
Between 1990 and 1995, Žiga studied at the Faculty of Business Administration, University of Economics in Bratislava. After completing his studies, he became a representative and manager in several Slovak and foreign companies, including the largest timber trader company Taper.

== Political career ==
As Minister of Environment in Fico's Second Cabinet, Žiga was investigated for suspicion of stealing the property of state forests, at the expense of which his private company profited.

In the 2020 Slovak parliamentary election, Žiga was elected to National Council of Slovakia as a member of Smer. He announced his departure together with nine other deputies later that year.

When Peter Pellegrini took office as president of Slovakia on 7 April 2024, Žiga was entrusted with the function of Chairman of the National Council of the Slovak Republic until 26 March 2025. He was succeeded by Richard Raši on 26 March 2025, and continues to be the Deputy Speaker of the National Council.

== Corruption allegations ==
Since becoming Minister of the Environment, Žiga has been investigated for corruption related to state-owned forests, from which his own private company is alleged to have benefited. The current government, elected in 2020, has launched investigations into several cases dating from during Žiga's tenure at the Ministry of the Environment, including alleged theft of public funds and Eurofunds, signing of unfavorable contracts for the export of timber, and channelling of millions in European Union subsidies to companies connected with Smer-SD.

In 2020, he was prosecuted for allegedly bribing a Supreme Court judge with 100,000 €, but thanks to an amendment to the criminal code passed by the government, the prosecution was stopped, due to change in the statute of limitations.

== Personal life ==
In 2016, Žiga was ranked among the 40 most influential people in the Slovak energy sector by Euractiv.
