= Ondrej Prostredník =

Slovak politician, evangelical priest, theologian, university lecturer

Personal details
- Born: 11 May 1963 (age 63) Bánovce nad Bebravou, Czechoslovakia
- Party: Progressive Slovakia
- Education: Comenius University; University of Leipzig
- Occupation: Politician, theologian, educator, evangelical pastor

Ondrej Prostredník (born 11 May 1963) is a Slovak evangelical priest, theologian, university lecturer and politician. He is member of the Progressive Slovakia party. Since 2023, he has served as an MP of the National Council of Slovakia.

== Biography ==
Ondrej Prostredník was born on 11 May 1963 in Bánovce nad Bebravou, Czechoslovakia. From 1982 to 1987 he studied at the Evangelical Divinity Faculty of Comenius University in Bratislava. The academic year 1985/86 he graduated from the Faculty of Theology at the Leipzig University in the then German Democratic Republic. In 1992 he spent one semester at the Lutheran Theological Seminary at Philadelphia, United States.

=== Work in the church and university ===
In 1987–1989 he worked as a clergyman, first as a chaplain in the evangelical church congregation in Pliešovce and in 1989–1995 as an evangelical pastor in Nitra. In 1995–1999 he worked in the Lutheran World Federation in Geneva in the field of strengthening the participation of young people in decision-making processes in the church. After returning from abroad, he was for three years (1999–2002) a minister for evangelical theology students in Bratislava. From 2002 to 2007 he was the Secretary General of the Ecumenical Council of Churches in the Slovak Republic. He studied for his doctorate from 2000 to 2005, and his dissertation was titled "The Church as Koinonia in Paul". In 2015, he habilitated with the topic "The Church as Charismatic Community according to 1K 12". From 2007 to 2011, he was the Dean of the Evangelical Divinity Faculty.

At the Evangelical Divinity School, he taught in the Department of the New Testament. Among the pedagogical topics he taught: Greek (koine), New Testament Bible Study, New Testament Ethics, New Testament Exegesis – Synoptic Gospels, The Life of Jesus, New Testament Theology – The Theology of Jesus. He also worked on the project "Prevention of Xenophobia and Anti-Semitism in the Church Setting". He was also involved in ecumenical and interreligious dialogue. Since 2018, he has been a missionary worker of the Evangelical congregation in Bratislava's Old Town.

=== Political career ===
Since 2018, he has been a member of the left-liberal party Progressive Slovakia. On the social network Facebook, he runs the platform Progresívni veriaci. In January 2019, Prostredník was presented as the party's candidate in the PS-SPOLU coalition for the 2019 elections to the European Parliament. He ran from eighth place on the candidate list, finished ninth with 12 965 preferential votes, and did not win a seat in the European Parliament.

In the February 2020 parliamentary elections, he stood as the 36th candidate on the PS/SPOLU coalition's list of candidates. He received 7,217 votes in the election, and after taking into account the preferential votes, he came 19th on the list of candidates. Due to the coalition's result, he did not get into the parliament. At the assembly of the Progressive Slovakia movement on 6 June 2020, he was elected as a member of its presidium.

In the 2022 municipal elections, he ran for the SaS/PS coalition and won a seat on the Pezinok City Council.

== Family ==
He is married and has three children with his wife Edita. He lives in Pezinok.
