= Prešov Regional Assembly =

Unicameral legislature of the Prešov Region

Prešov Regional Assembly Zastupiteľstvo prešovského samosprávneho kraja

Type
- Type: Unicameral

Leadership
- Governor: Milan Majerský, KDH since 29 October 2022

Structure
- Seats: 65
- Political groups: Independents (27) Smer-SD, Hlas-SD, Szövetség (16) KDH, Sloboda a Solidarita, We Are Family, For The People (16) Mayors and Independent Candidates (2) Chance, PS DS, ODS (1) Slovakia (political party) (1) Republic (political party( (1)

Elections
- Voting system: Plurality block voting
- Last election: 29. October 2022
- Next election: By 2026

Meeting place
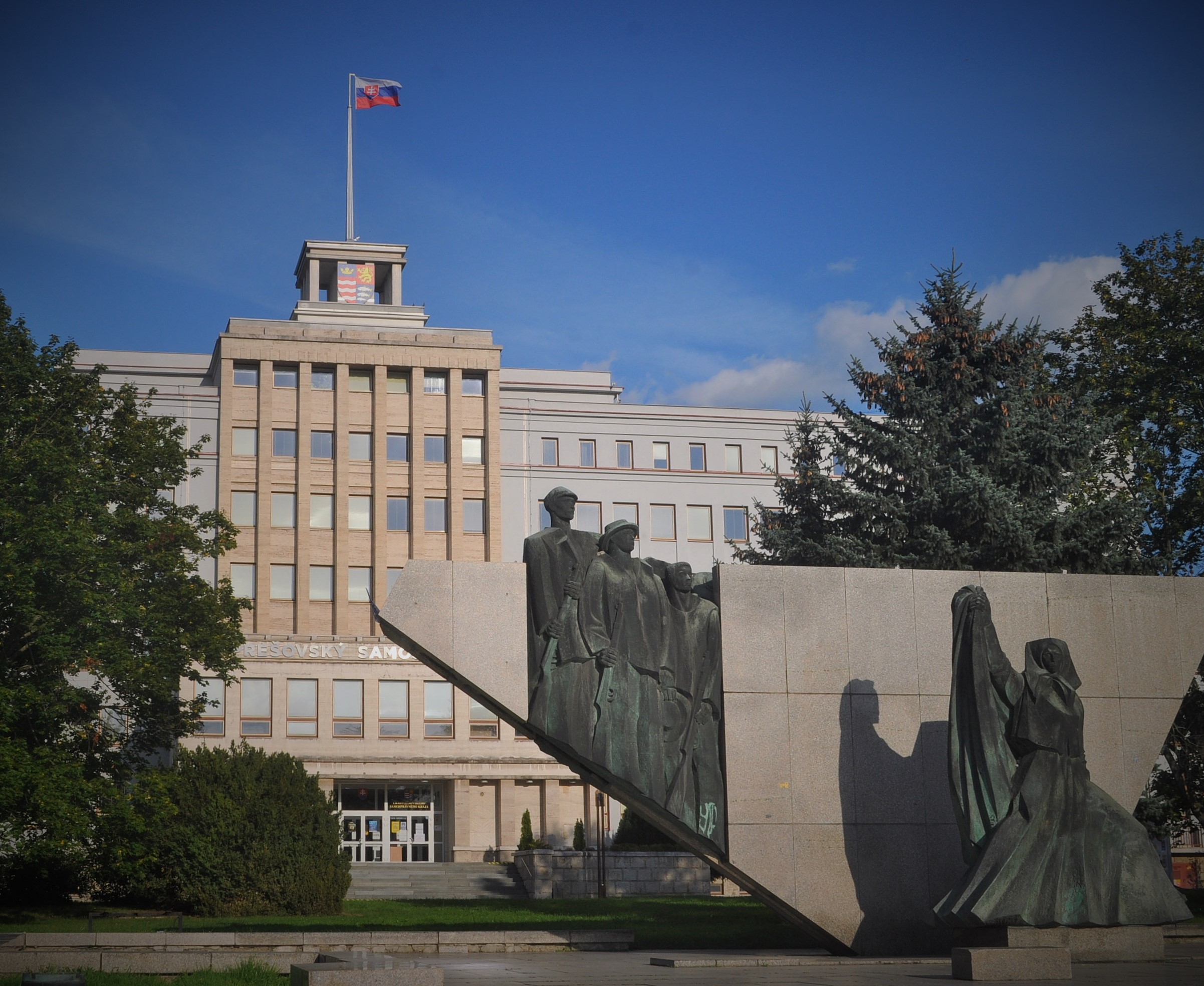
- Prešov Region Building, Prešov

Website
- psk.sk/domov/zpsk/

The Prešov Regional Assembly (Slovak: Zastupiteľstvo Prešovského samosprávneho kraja) is the unicameral legislature of the Prešov Region. It is elected via direct, universal suffrage for a term length of four years. It votes on proposals suggested by the councilors; in order for a law to pass, the Assembly needs a 2/5 majority of "yes" votes.
