= Oskar Dvořák =

Slovak politician

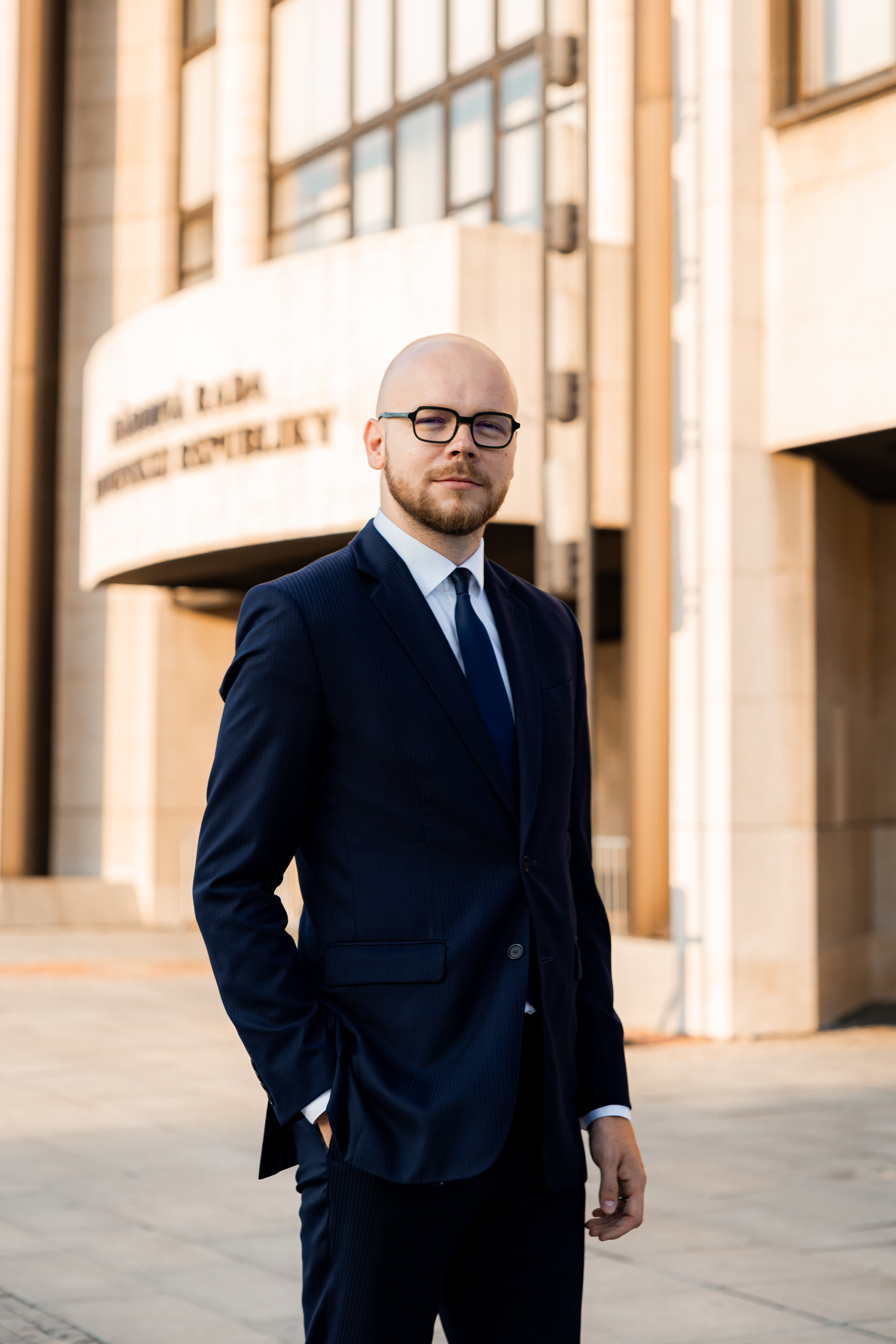
Oskar Dvořák

Oskar Dvořák (born 15 July 1991) is a Slovak politician. Since 2023 he serves as an MP of the National Council of Slovakia.

== Biography ==
=== Early life ===
Oskar Dvořák was born on 15 July 1991 in Trnava. He studied political science and public policy at the Comenius University. Following graduation he worked for the Slovak branch of Transparency International and later as a staffer of the MP Miroslav Beblavý.

=== Political career ===
Dvořák started his political career as the chief healthcare expert of the Spolu party established by Beblavý. In the 2020 Slovak parliamentary election he was on the list of the coalition of Spolu and Progressive Slovakia, which narrowly failed to pass the representation threshold. Following the election, he became the director of the unit responsible for healthcare reform at the Ministry of health.

In January 2023 Dvořák joined Progressive Slovakia. Following the 2023 Slovak parliamentary election he gained a seat in the parliament.

== Recognitions ==
In 2022 he was included in the Forbes Slovakia "30 under 30" list.
