= Červený Hrádok =

Červený Hrádok Barsvörösvár
- Municipality
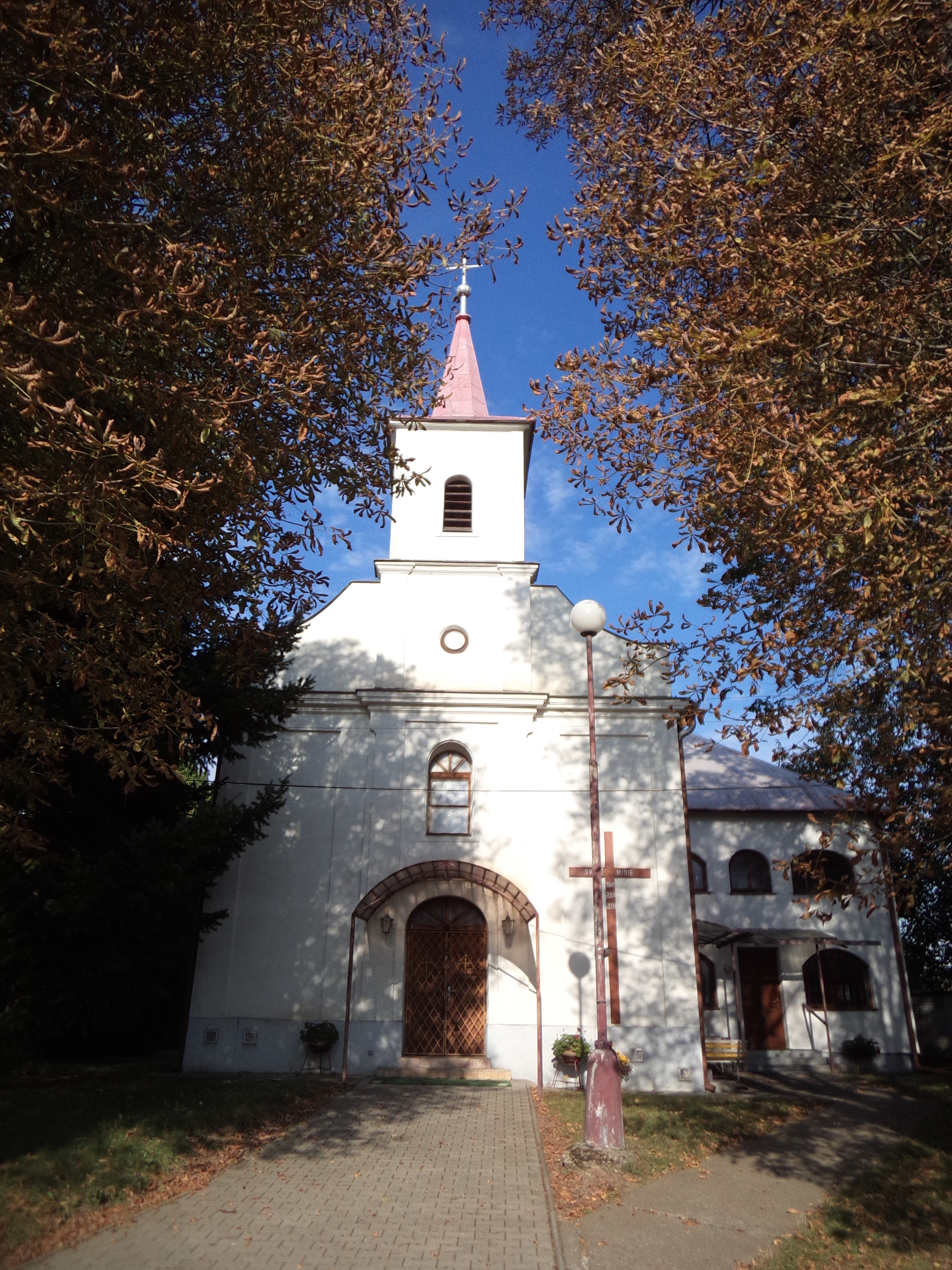

- Flag

- Location of Červený Hrádok in the Nitra Region Location of Červený Hrádok in Slovakia
- Coordinates: 48.30°N 18.38°E
- Country: Slovakia
- Region: Nitra Region
- District: Zlaté Moravce District
- First mentioned: 1386

Area
  - Total: 5.49 km^{2} (2.12 sq mi)
- Elevation: 170 m (560 ft)

Population (2025)
  - Total: 445
- Time zone: UTC+1 (CET)
  - Summer (DST): UTC+2 (CEST)
- Postal code: 951 82
- Area code: +421 37
- Vehicle registration plate (until 2022): ZM
- Website: www.cervenyhradok.sk

Červený Hrádok (Hungarian: Barsvörösvár) is a village and municipality in Zlaté Moravce District of the Nitra Region, in western-central Slovakia.

== History ==
In historical records the village was first mentioned in 1386.

== Geography ==
The municipality lies at an altitude of 170 metres (560 ft) and covers an area of 5.49 km^{2} (2.12 sq mi) (2025).

== Population ==
Population statistic (10 years)
Year	1995	2005	2015	2025
Count	424	426	410	445
Difference		+0.47%	−3.75%	+8.53%

Population statistic
Year	2024	2025
Count	442	445
Difference		+0.67%

It has a population of 445 people (31 December 2025).

=== Ethnicity ===
Census 2021 (1+ %)
Ethnicity	Number	Fraction
Slovak	406	96.89%
Not found out	7	1.67%
Total	419	

In year 2021 was 419 people by ethnicity 406 as Slovak, 7 as Not found out, 4 as Czech, 3 as Ukrainian, 3 as Hungarian, 1 as Russian and 1 as Other.

Note on population: The difference values of population numbers in the table "Population statistic" and in the sections "Ethnicity" & "Religion" is caused by the use of various statistical methods.

=== Religion ===
Census 2021 (1+ %)
Religion	Number	Fraction
Roman Catholic Church	369	88.07%
None	29	6.92%
Other	5	1.19%
Total	419	

In year 2021 was 419 people by religion 369 from Roman Catholic Church, 29 from None, 5 from Other, 4 from Not found out, 3 from Old Catholic Church, 3 from Greek Catholic Church, 3 from Evangelical Church, 2 from Eastern Orthodox Church and 1 from Ad hoc movements.

== Genealogical resources ==
The records for genealogical research are available at the state archive "Statny Archiv in Nitra, Slovakia"

- Roman Catholic church records (births/marriages/deaths): 1711-1895 (parish B)
- Reformated church records (births/marriages/deaths): 1827-1895 (parish B)

== See also ==
- List of municipalities and towns in Slovakia
