= Andrej Danko =

Slovak politician

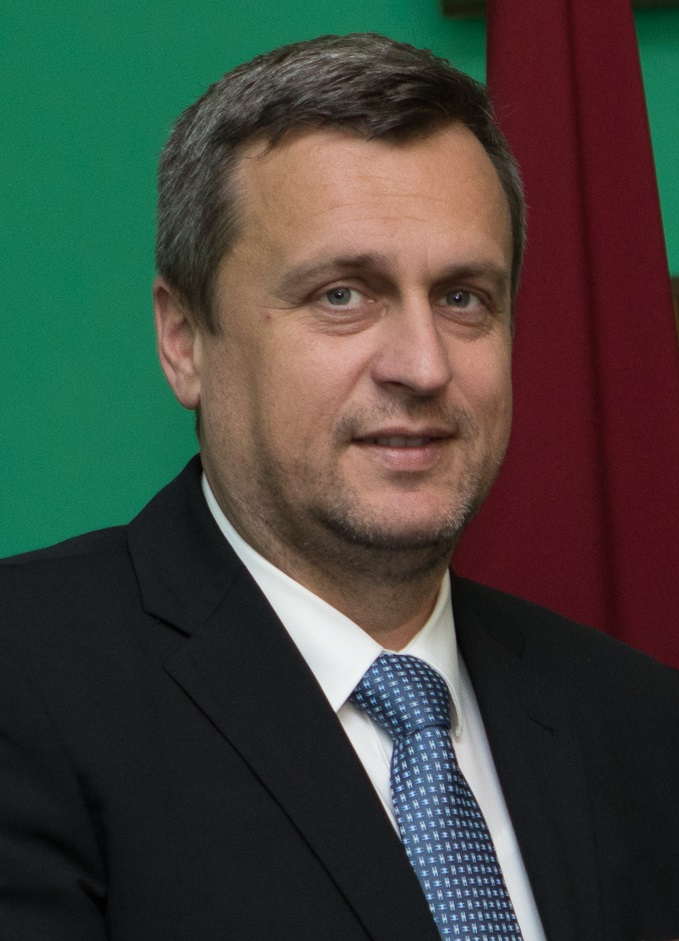
- Danko in 2018

Speaker of the National Council
- In office 23 March 2016 – 20 March 2020
- President: Andrej Kiska; Zuzana Čaputová
- Deputy: See list: Béla Bugár; Lucia Ďuriš Nicholsonová; Martin Glváč; Andrej Hrnčiar; Martin Klus
- Preceded by: Peter Pellegrini
- Succeeded by: Boris Kollár

Deputy Speaker of the National Council
- Incumbent
- Assumed office 25 October 2023 Serving with Peter Žiga, Michal Šimečka, Ľuboš Blaha, Tibor Gašpar and Martin Dubéci
- Speaker: Peter Pellegrini; Richard Raši

Member of the National Council
- Incumbent
- Assumed office 25 October 2023
- In office 23 March 2016 – 20 March 2020

Chairman of the Slovak National Party
- Incumbent
- Assumed office 6 October 2012
- Preceded by: Ján Slota

Personal details
- Born: 12 August 1974 (age 52) Revúca, Czechoslovakia (now Slovakia)
- Party: Slovak National Party
- Spouse: Silvia Žiaková (m. 1999; div. 2014)
- Children: 2
- Education: Comenius University (JUDr.)

Andrej Danko (born 12 August 1974) is a Slovak politician who was the speaker of the National Council of the Slovak Republic from 2016 to 2020 and Chairman of the nationalist Slovak National Party since 2012.

== Early life ==
Born in Revúca, Danko studied at the Faculty of Law at Comenius University in Bratislava.

== Career ==
After compulsory military service, Danko founded several commercial companies and worked as an independent lawyer.

Between 2006 and 2010, Danko was an assistant in the National Council of Slovakia and a member of several parliamentary commissions. He became first vice-president of the Slovak National Party in 2010. In 2012, he became the chairman of the party after getting support from many of the party's members, succeeding Ján Slota.

On 23 March 2016, Danko was elected Speaker of the National Council. He later called for the burqa to be banned in Slovakia. In 2017, he made an official visit to Russia and gave a speech to the State Duma.

In the 2020 parliamentary election, SNS failed to pass 5% threshold, losing all of their MPs.

After the 2023 parliamentary election, SNS gained 10 MPs, and joined 4th Fico's cabinet. Among them were 4 former candidets for a neo-nazi People's Party Our Slovakia (including Tomáš Taraba, who became a government minister). Other MPs were moderators of a disinformation internet television.

In 2024, Danko advocated a ban on education on gender identity and sexual orientation in Slovak schools.

=== Promotion to the rank of Captain in Reserve ===
In September 2016, while in his position as the Speaker of the Parliament, Danko was promoted by eight ranks (from OR-4 to O-2), to Captain in Reserve of the Slovak Army, by Minister of Defence Peter Gajdoš. The promotion was viewed by as a sign of corrupt government as a promotion by eight ranks has never happened in the history of Slovak Army, not at all to someone who has only joined mandatory national service for the period of one year. On 29 April 2020, Minister of Defence Jaroslav Naď canceled his rank.

=== Plagiarism allegations ===
In 2018, Danko was accused of plagiarism of his doctoral thesis at Matej Bel University in 2000. When media showed interest in his thesis, he asked the university to ban public access to it. Following public pressure, Danko removed the ban after one month and the university library allowed the public to see the thesis, but not to take pictures of it. The university set up a commission to review his thesis later that November. According to the conclusion published by the commission in January 2019, the rigorous procedure met valid regulations, but the thesis contains parts that only slightly differ from original sources, most of the thesis is the same to a large extent and it preserves also the structure of sources without proper citation or paraphrasing.

=== Presidential campaign ===
Danko was a candidate in the 2024 presidential election. Previously, he urged Róbert Fico to run for the office, but Fico declined. During his campaign, he criticized his opponent and Speaker of the National Council, Peter Pellegrini, as a traitor to Fico. Five days before the first round, he dropped out and endorsed Štefan Harabin.

== Personal life ==
Danko lost his driver's license on Wednesday, 17 January 2024. This happened six days after a traffic accident in which he damaged a traffic light column in Bratislava's Dúbravka at the intersection of Saratovská and Repašská streets. He told JOJ 24 that he ran away from the scene of the accident, which happened at 11:21 p.m., before the police could arrive. He justified his action with the words "...because I can't write a report with a column". He underwent a breath test only 15 hours later the accident. Besides losing his driver's license, had to pay 900 € and voluntarily cleaned surrounding area for 2 hours.

Political offices
Preceded by Peter Pellegrini	Speaker of the National Council; 2016–2020	Succeeded by Boris Kollár
