= Sveržov =

- Municipality
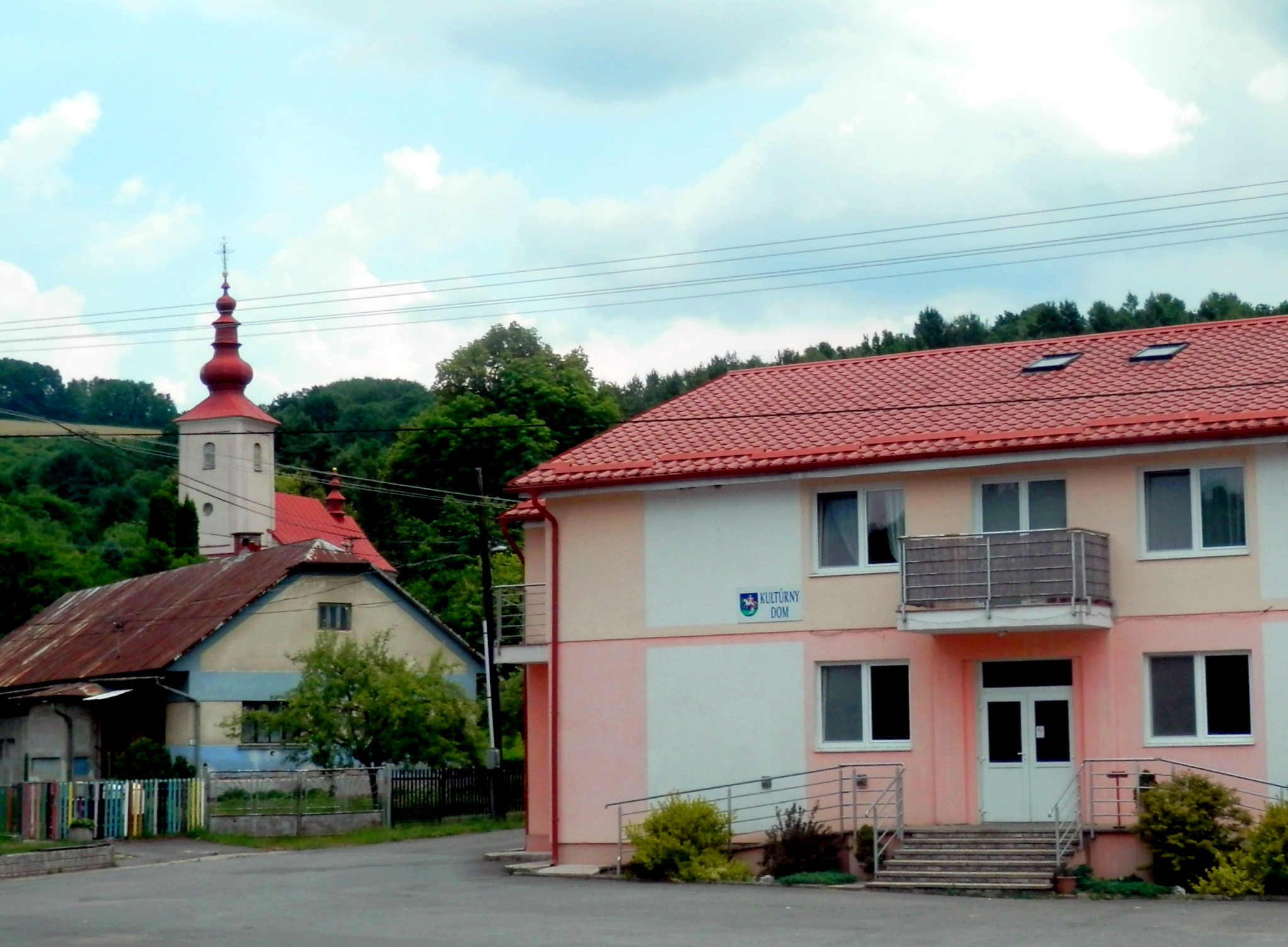

- Flag

- Location of Sveržov in the Prešov Region Location of Sveržov in Slovakia
- Coordinates: 49.33°N 21.17°E
- Country: Slovakia
- Region: Prešov Region
- District: Bardejov District
- First mentioned: 1355

Area
  - Total: 5.70 km^{2} (2.20 sq mi)
- Elevation: 347 m (1,138 ft)

Population (2025)
  - Total: 684
- Time zone: UTC+1 (CET)
  - Summer (DST): UTC+2 (CEST)
- Postal code: 860 2
- Area code: +421 54
- Vehicle registration plate (until 2022): BJ
- Website: sverzov.sk

Sveržov is a village and municipality in Bardejov District in the Prešov Region of north-east Slovakia.

== History ==
In historical records the village was first mentioned in 1355

== Geography ==
The municipality lies at an altitude of 347 metres (1,138 ft) and covers an area of 5.70 km^{2} (2.20 sq mi) (2025).

== Population ==
Population statistic (10 years)
Year	1995	2005	2015	2025
Count	439	513	593	684
Difference		+16.85%	+15.59%	+15.34%

Population statistic
Year	2024	2025
Count	677	684
Difference		+1.03%

It has a population of 684 people (31 December 2025).

=== Ethnicity ===
Census 2021 (1+ %)
Ethnicity	Number	Fraction
Slovak	616	99.83%
Romani	112	18.15%
Total	617	

In year 2021 was 617 people by ethnicity 616 as Slovak, 112 as Romani, 4 as Rusyn, 3 as Other, 2 as Czech and 1 as Not found out.

Note on population: The difference values of population numbers in the table "Population statistic" and in the sections "Ethnicity" & "Religion" is caused by the use of various statistical methods.

=== Religion ===
Census 2021 (1+ %)
Religion	Number	Fraction
Roman Catholic Church	329	53.32%
Evangelical Church	199	32.25%
Greek Catholic Church	31	5.02%
Apostolic Church	21	3.4%
None	15	2.43%
Eastern Orthodox Church	10	1.62%
Total	617	

In year 2021 was 617 people by religion 329 from Roman Catholic Church, 199 from Evangelical Church, 31 from Greek Catholic Church, 21 from Apostolic Church, 15 from None, 10 from Eastern Orthodox Church, 5 from Other, 3 from Other and not ascertained christian church, 2 from Christian Congregations in Slovakia, 1 from Old Catholic Church and 1 from Calvinist Church.
