= Edita Angyalová =

Slovak politician (born 1979)

Ex Member of the National Council
- In office 15 October 2002 – 30 April 2007

Personal details
- Born: 8 August 1979 (age 47) Košice, Czechoslovakia
- Education: University of Economics in Bratislava

Edita Angyalová (born 8 August 1979) is a Slovak entrepreneur, manager with 20+years of experience, and an ex-politician, former MP of the National Council.

== Political career ==
In 2002, she was elected to parliament on the Direction – Slovak Social Democracy list at the age of 23 after winning an essay competition organized by the party while still studying business at the University of Economics in Bratislava along with another winner Róbert Madej. She was not reelected in the 2006 Slovak parliamentary election, but gained a mandate as a replacement for Marek Maďarič, who gave up his mandate to serve as the Minister of Culture. On 30 April 2007, she gave up her mandate and left politics to pursue a career in the private sector. In 2012, she became the first female Slovak (ex-) politician to come out as gay, admitting negative spotlight on her personal life also added to her decision to quit politics.
