= Stanislav Fořt =

Slovak politician

Member of the National Council
- In office 8 July 2010 – 4 April 2012

Personal details
- Born: 29 August 1977 (age 48) Martin, Czechoslovakia
- Party: Freedom and Solidarity
- Education: University of Economics in Bratislava; University of Trnava

Stanislav Fořt (born 29 August 1977) is a Slovak politician who served as a Member of the National Council in 2010 to 2012.

== Life and education ==
Fořt was born in Martin. He studied accounting at the University of Economics in Bratislava, graduating in 2000. Additionally, he study law at the University of Trnava, graduating in 2009.

== Political career ==
During the 2010 Slovak parliamentary election, Fořt ran on the list of the Freedom and Solidarity party, which he co-founded, and gained a seat. In 2011, he became the first male Slovak politician to publicly come out as gay. In an interview with SME, he stated he hoped his coming out would help other LGBT people to feel more comfortable in Slovakia.

Fořt failed to retain his seat in the 2012 Slovak parliamentary election and subsequently announced his retirement from politics. Nonetheless, he unsuccessfully ran again in the 2016 Slovak parliamentary election.
