= Erika Jurinová =

Slovak politician

Member of the National Council
- In office 8 July 2010 – 5 January 2018

Personal details
- Born: 31 August 1971 (age 54) Nižná, Czechoslovakia
- Party: Ordinary People and Independent Personalities
- Spouse: Pavol Jurina
- Children: 3
- Education: Technical University of Liberec
- Occupation: Politician, teacher

Erika Jurinová (born 31 August 1971) is a Slovak teacher and politician. In 2010–2018, she was a member of the National Council. Since 2017, she has served as the governor of the Žilina Region. She is the first, and as of 2022 only, female regional governor in Slovakia.

== Early life ==
Jurinová studied clothing design at the Technical University of Liberec, graduating in 1994. After graduation, until 2002, she worked as a teacher at the United School in Námestovo. In 2007, she became the chief editor of a regional advertisement newspaper owned by her future political ally Igor Matovič.

== Political career ==
=== National Council ===
In the 2010 Slovak parliamentary election Jurinová was elected on the Freedom and Solidarity. In 2010, she became the founding member of the Ordinary People and Independent Personalities party. She was reelected to the parliament in 2012 and 2016. In 2018 she resigned her seat to be able to focus on her duties as the Regional Governor.

=== Žilina region governor ===
In 2017 Jurinová became the governor by defeating the incumbent Juraj Blanár by 14 percentage points. In 2022, she comfortably retained her seat.

== Personal life ==
Jurinová is married and has three daughters.
