= Tamara Stohlová =

Slovak politician (born 1989)

Member of the National Council
- Incumbent
- Assumed office 25 October 2023

Personal details
- Born: 10 June 1989 (age 37)
- Party: Progressive Slovakia
- Education: University of Glamorgan; Vrije Universiteit Amsterdam

Tamara Stohlová (born 10 June 1989) is a Slovak politician. She is an MP of the National Council elected in 2023.

== Early life and activism ==
Tamara Stohlová was born on 10 June 1989. She briefly studied computer science and management at the Comenius University and eventually obtained her degree in business studies at the University of Glamorgan. She also holds an MSc degree in business administration from the Vrije Universiteit Amsterdam.

After graduation, Stohlová worked for the Slovak branch of Transparency International and contributed to OECD reports. She also founded a start up promoting vegetarian meals at university cantinas.

Stohlová has also been active in environmental activism. In June 2020, she published a previously publicly unavailable report from 2009 on massive contamination of soil and underground water reserves in Bratislava by the former chemical factory Istrochem.

== Political career ==
Stohlová started her political career as an aide to the MP Miroslav Beblavý. In 2020 Slovak parliamentary election, Stohlová ran on the list of the Progressive Slovakia and SPOLU, which narrowly fell under the representation threshold. Subsequently, she worked as an aide to the Progressive Slovakia MEP Michal Wiezik. In 2023 Slovak parliamentary election, Stohlová was elected to the National Council on the list of Progressive Slovakia.
