= Ľuboš Blaha =

Slovak politician (born 1979)

Ľuboš Blaha MEP
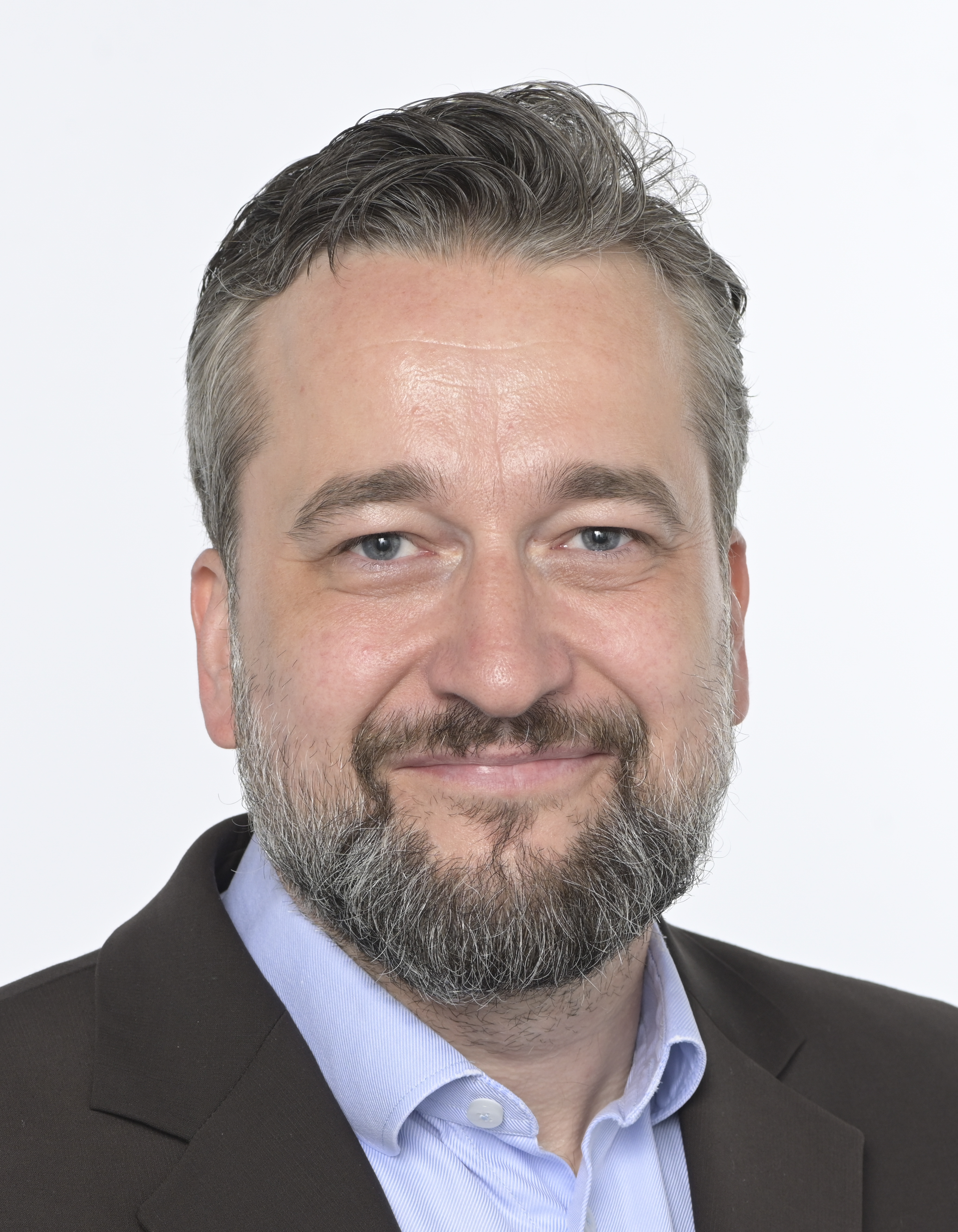
- Ľuboš Blaha in 2024

Member of the European Parliament for Slovakia
- Incumbent
- Assumed office 16 July 2024

Deputy Speaker of the National Council
- In office 25 October 2023 – 25 June 2024 Serving with Andrej Danko, Michal Šimečka and Peter Žiga
- Speaker: Peter Pellegrini; Peter Žiga (acting)

Member of the National Council
- In office 4 April 2012 – 25 June 2024

Personal details
- Born: 7 December 1979 (age 46) Bratislava, Czechoslovakia
- Party: Direction – Social Democracy (2020–present)
- Other political affiliations: Communist Party of Slovakia (previously)
- Spouse: Zuzana Blahová
- Children: 3
- Education: Matej Bel University (PhDr.); Comenius University (PhD)

Ľuboš Blaha

Academic work
- Discipline: political science, political philosophy, international relations theory, imperialism studies, world-systems theory, cultural studies
- School or tradition: Neo-Marxian economics, post-Marxism, autonomist Marxism, Marxist-Leninist anti-imperialism
- Institutions: Institute of Political Science of SAS
- Website: www.upv.sav.sk/phdr-lubos-blaha-phd/

Ľuboš Blaha (born 7 December 1979) is a Slovak politician, academic, post-Marxist philosopher and political scientist. He is a member of the National Council of the Slovak Republic, a presidium member of the left-wing populist party Direction – Slovak Social Democracy and Robert Fico's foreign-policy aide. Blaha has served as a Member of the European Parliament since 2024, having previously served as an MP of the National Council of Slovakia from 2012 to 2024.

Blaha's has described his political positions as left-wing populist, anti-capitalist and left-wing nationalist. He describes himself as an "anti-globalist neo-Marxist" in the tradition of Wallerstein's world-systems theory, Robinson's concept of global capitalism and Hardt and Negri's theory of Empire.

Blaha was member of Slovakian metal band Ethereal Pandemonium where he was active as a keyboardist.

== Political career ==
He graduated from elementary school and gymnasium in his hometown Bratislava. He studied political science at the Matej Bel University in Banská Bystrica. He continued his studies at the Comenius University in Bratislava (majoring in philosophy) From 2004 to 2006, Blaha worked for the Communist Party of Slovakia as the Head of its International Department. Despite calling him to give up on his tenure, Blaha works as a political scientist at the Institute of Political Sciences at the Slovak Academy of Sciences. Blaha has been a member of the National Council of the Slovak Republic since 2012.

In the 2024 European Parliament election he was elected to the European Parliament with 187,020 preferential votes, the second most after Ľudovít Ódor. In 2025, he visited Russia and claimed that while the West is "broken," Russia is strong and that "the West is losing, and Russia is winning." He also met with the Russian director of the Foreign Intelligence Service, Sergey Naryshkin.

== Political views ==
Blaha used to support modern Western Marxism, radical democratic movements, and culturally liberal positions. He argues that in the era of neoliberal globalization, the Left must be more focused on socio-economic (redistribution of wealth, cooperative ownership, economic democracy) rather than cultural issues and that the social conservatism of working class in Slovakia must be accommodated.

Particularly, Blaha has praised the high progressive taxes and workers' project funds. In Slovakia, he promotes the cooperative business model such as the Spanish-Basque Mondragon Corporation.

=== Foreign policy ===
Ľuboš Blaha is a foreign policy realist. His opinions are inspired by the school of international political realism (e.g. the ideas of Kenneth Waltz and John Mearsheimer) and neo-Marxism (especially William I. Robinson, Immanuel Wallerstein and Antonio Negri). He strongly criticizes U.S. foreign policy. He vehemently condemned not only the war in Iraq, but also the war in Afghanistan. He also criticized the Western involvement in Libya and Syria. He is a critic of the foreign policy of Israel in relation to Palestine. He advocates for the rights of Armenians in relation to the Nagorno-Karabakh and criticizes Turkish foreign policy. He endorses many of the ideas of Noam Chomsky and Slavoj Žižek.

==== Russia ====
He is one of the greatest defenders of the Russian Federation in Slovakia since the Russo-Ukrainian War broke out. He is an apologist for Vladimir Putin's regime, but he perceives the crisis in Ukraine as a geopolitical clash between the West and Russia, and he rejects what he considers one-sided criticism of Russia and the growing Russophobia in Europe. He has openly criticized the sanctions against Russia and he describes Russia as a friendly nation that liberated Slovakia from fascism in 1945.

==== European Union ====
Blaha is very critical of the European Union. He considers the EU a neoliberal and elitist project, but he does not see a better alternative for Slovakia than the EU. He supports the fight for a different, better, and more social Europe that will be more left-wing and democratic. In the past, he advocated the project of European basic income, he consistently promotes social economy and cooperatives, and strongly advocates for a "Social Union".

He is a sharp critic of the TTIP agreement in Slovakia. He was the first Slovak Member of Parliament to visit the so-called "TTIP Reading Room". He describes the agreement as synonymous with neo-liberalism and the colonization of the European social model by American transnational corporations, and as the Chairman of the National Council of the Slovak Republic for European Affairs he actively supports its intense scrutiny.

In the 2016 election campaign, he expressed disenchantment with the EU and stressed the four issues which he sees as the main failures of Europe: Greece, Russia, TTIP and the migration crisis. There were other main themes of his election campaign in addition to the criticism of the European Union – resistance to capitalism and exploitation; resistance to Western imperialism and propaganda; fight for peace. Blaha espouses socialism, anti-capitalism, alter-globalism and moderate pacifism. Thus, he is marked as a "Russian agent" by critics.

==== Greece ====
During the Greek crisis in 2015, he openly supported Syriza and defended the arguments of Alexis Tsipras and Yanis Varoufakis. After the breaking-up of Syriza and the agreement between Greece and its creditors, he further criticizes the EU for the imposition of a "neo-liberal diktat". He remains a supporter of Syriza.

=== Migration ===
Blaha opposed mandatory quota proposals during migration crisis. His arguments were based on human rights (not forcing refugees to be settled in countries in which they do not want to live), on tactical thinking (Central European societies are not ready for shock solutions, they need time and sensitive approach), and on political realism (mandatory quotas in these societies, he claimed, would only favor fascists and the political far-right). He has criticized "bleeding-heart liberals" for their supposed contempt for the people who are afraid of uncontrolled migration, calling them "racists" and "xenophobes". However, he strongly refuses and condemns islamophobia and advocates for the solidarity of Slovakia with the EU, be it material, financial or personal.

He is the author of the Declaration of the National Council of the Slovak Republic, in which all Slovak parliamentary groups declared their opposition to the quotas and emphasized other forms of solidarity, systemic solutions and the fight against right-wing extremists taking advantage of the migration crisis.

== Criticism and controversies ==
The International Press Institute, along with the Slovak Academy of Sciences, condemned his abusive series of Facebook posts targeting two female Slovak journalists in 2019. Slovak Academy of Sciences and Academy of the Police Force condemned his posts on social media which go against the ethical code of the institutions. Security company ESET sued Blaha to protect its reputation. Court ordered Blaha to erase false posts about ESET. He called a special prosecutor a "young snot" (while falsely claiming the prosecutor was only 25 years old).

In July 2020, Blaha was investigated by the Police Corps under the law that prohibits denying or approving genocide or crimes against humanity. Blaha had posted on Facebook about "lies about murderous communists and innocent victims", claiming that the Communist regime had eliminated gangsters and helped ordinary people. The investigation and the charges were dropped in September 2020.

He has been repeatedly criticized for spreading hoaxes, conspiracy theories and disinformation through Facebook posts in which he attacks President Zuzana Čaputová, government politicians, several media outlets, the third sector, the Slovak Republic's foreign policy, the vaccination against COVID-19, and spreads pro-Russian disinformation narratives.

In February 2022, the Slovak Academy of Sciences called Blaha to give up on his tenure immediately. However, Blaha refused to resign by saying the Academy could burn him to death, imprison and persecute him, but he will not give up his freedom of speech.

Blaha was banned from Facebook for COVID-19 misinformation on 14 June 2022.

== Books ==
- Blaha, Ľuboš. Social Justice and Identity. Bratislava: VEDA, 2006. 164 p. ISBN 8022408913.
- Blaha, Ľuboš. Back to Marx? (A Welfare State, Economic Democracy and Theories of Justice). Bratislava: VEDA, 2009. 526 p. ISBN 9788022410779.
- Blaha, Ľuboš.The Matrix of Capitalism – An Approaching Revolution? Bratislava: VEDA, 2011. 176 p. ISBN 9788022412308.
- Blaha, Ľuboš. The Haunts of Capitalism, or, The Beginning of a New Era?: Interviews with Critical Intellectuals Bratislava: VSSS, 2012. 384 p. ISBN 9788080614706. (with Dinka, Pavol. Žižek, Slavoj. Albert, Michael. Bělohradský, Václav. Hauser, Michael. Hrubec, Marek. Keller Jan. Krejčí, Oskar. Robinson, William I. Schweickart, David. Švihlíková, Ilona. Michelko, Roman)
- Blaha, Ľuboš. The European Social Model – What's Next? Bratislava: VEDA, 2014. 480 p. ISBN 9788022413961.
- Blaha, Ľuboš. The Metastases of Global Capitalism: Dialogues with Leftist Intellectuals Bratislava: Matica slovenská, 2017. 136 p. ISBN 9788081281822. (with Daubner, Peter. Chmelár, Eduard, Keller Jan. Hrubec, Marek. Peffer, Rodney. Harris, Jerry)
- Blaha, Ľuboš. The Antiglobalist Bratislava: VEDA, 2020. 342 p. ISBN 9788022417204.
- Vidovan, Peter (Blaha, Ľuboš). Lenin and the 21st century Bratislava: VEDA, 2021. 254 p. ISBN 9788022418942.
- Blaha, Ľuboš. Che Bratislava: R Free Press, 2024. 367 p. ISBN 9788097409753.
