= František Knapík =

Slovak politician

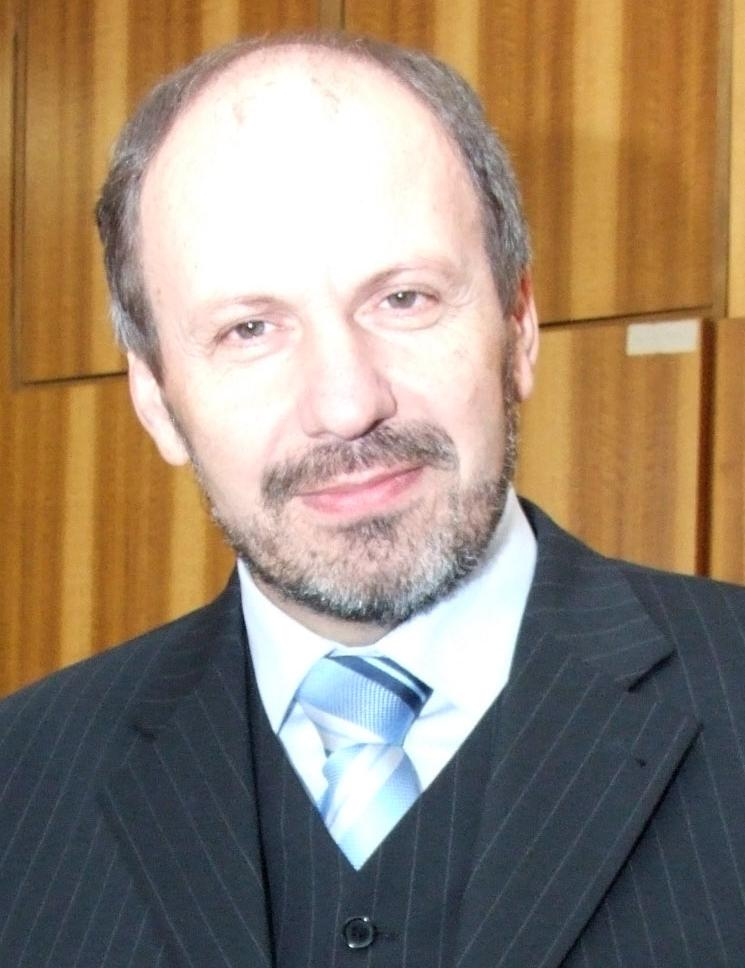
František Knapík

František Knapík (born 17 October 1956 in Ľubotín) was the mayor of the Slovak city of Košice until December 2010, and a member of the Christian Democratic Movement (KDH).

He studied at a grammar school (gymnasium) in Sabinov and at the College of Forestry and Lumbering, Faculty of Forestry in Zvolen. He worked then in forestry companies from 1980 to 1996, when he became a mayor of Košice's borough of Košická Nová Ves, staying at that position until 2003, when he was appointed as a deputy of the mayor of Košice. In 2006 he was acting mayor of Košice, later being appointed in a by-election on 8 April. In December that year he was elected mayor of Košice for a four-year term. Since 2006 he is also member of the Committee of the Regions of the European Union in Brussels, where he prepared a report on the Western Balkans adopted in November 2008.
