= Róbert Puci =

Slovak politician (born 1973)

Member of the National Council
- Incumbent
- Assumed office 4 April 2012

Personal details
- Born: 13 June 1973 (age 52) Trebišov, Czechoslovakia
- Party: Direction – Slovak Social Democracy (2012–2020); Voice – Social Democracy (since 2020)

Róbert Puci (born 13 June 1973 in Trebišov) is a Slovak politician. He has served as a member of the National Council since 2012, as well as Direction – Slovak Social Democracy until 2020. Puci was known as a staunch loyalist of the party chairman and prime minister Robert Fico. Nonetheless, when the party split in 2020, he left Direction to join Voice – Social Democracy.
