= Tomáš Taraba =

Slovak politician (born 1980)

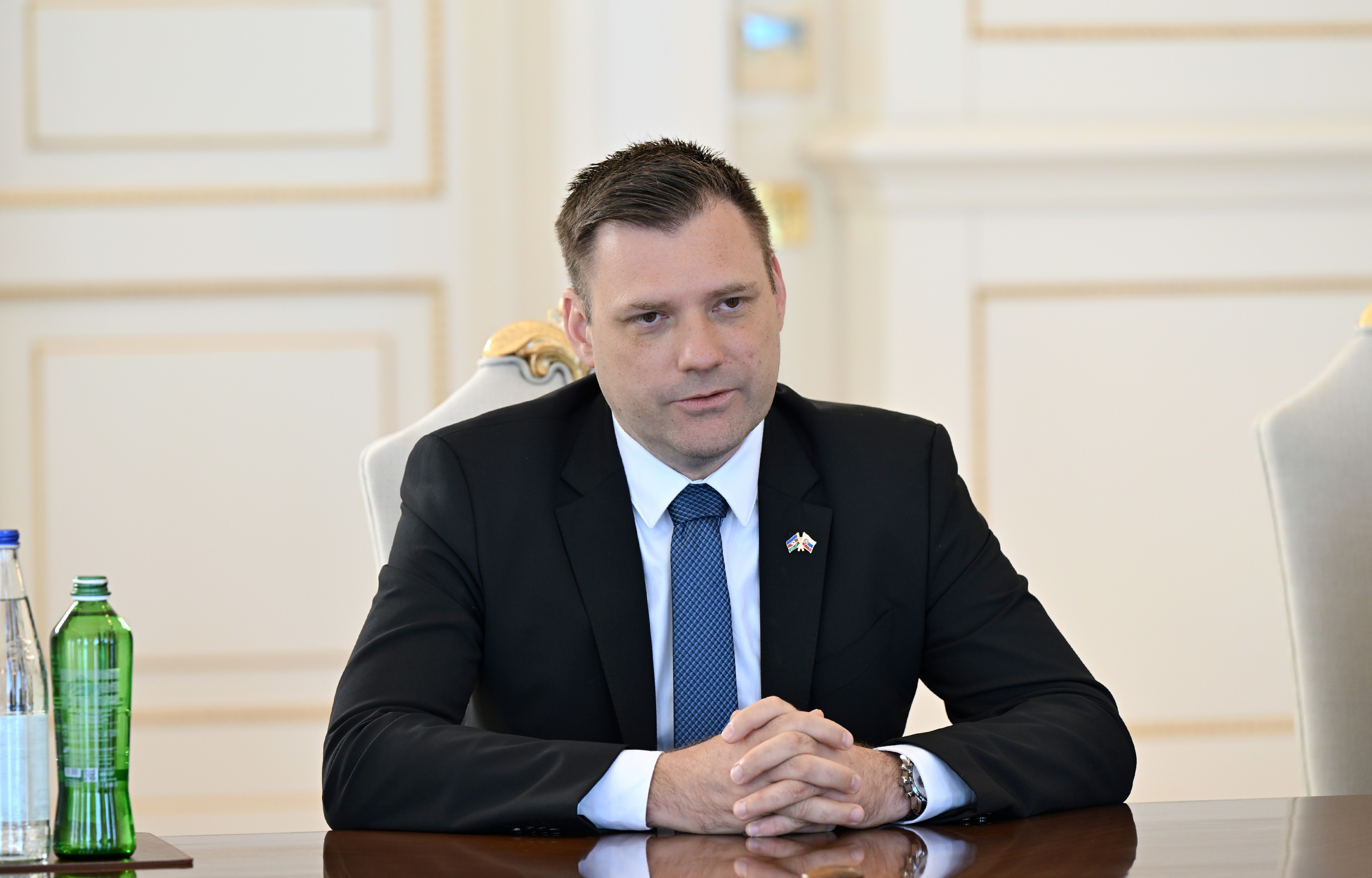

Deputy Prime Minister of Slovakia
- In office 25 October 2023 – 30 September 2026 Serving with Robert Kaliňák, Peter Kmec and Denisa Saková
- Prime Minister: Robert Fico

Minister of Environment
- In office 25 October 2023 – 30 September 2026
- Prime Minister: Robert Fico
- Preceded by: Milan Chrenko
- Succeeded by: Robert Fico (acting)

Member of the National Council
- Incumbent
- Assumed office 30 September 2026
- In office 20 March 2020 – 25 October 2023

Personal details
- Born: 13 February 1980 (age 46) Modra, Czechoslovakia (now Slovakia)
- Party: TARABA (2026–)
- Other political affiliations: Život (2019–2023); ĽSNS (2019–2020); SNS (2023–2026)
- Spouse: Denisa
- Children: 5
- Education: Comenius University (Mgr.); University of Economics in Bratislava (Ing.); University of Regensburg

Tomáš Taraba (born 13 February 1980) is a Slovak politician who served as Deputy Prime Minister of Slovakia and Minister of Environment in the Fourth cabinet of Robert Fico from 25 October 2023 to 30 September 2026.

With a previous business background, Taraba was elected to the National Council in 2020 on the list of Kotlebists – People's Party Our Slovakia. Notably, he was never a formal member of the People's Party, neither before nor after his election. From 2019 to 2023, he served as chairman of Life – National Party. Taraba suspended his party membership to run on the list of the Slovak National Party, on which he was elected in the 2023 parliamentary election. Taraba is among the three most popular ministers in the Slovak government, boasting a total approval rating of 43% as of April 2024.

== Early life and education ==
Taraba was educated at Pezinok Grammar School. Afterwards, he studied political science at the Comenius University, graduating in 2003. Taraba also studied business management at the University of Regensburg. Upon graduation, Taraba worked as in the private sector and in the SARIO government agency.

== Political career ==
Taraba acted as an advisor to the chairman of the Christian Democratic Movement, Ján Figeľ, which both of them denied. He worked at SARIO in the foreign direct investment section in 2006.

Taraba joined Life – National Party in 2019 and became its chairman at the same time. In the 2020 Slovak parliamentary election, he was among the Life members elected on the ballot of the far right People's Party Our Slovakia. Taraba left the parliamentary group of the People's Party shortly after the February election due to political disagreements with Milan Mazurek at the end of May 2020.

In March 2021 interviews during the coalition crisis, Taraba expressed possible support for the minority government after the potential departure of SaS and For the People.

Taraba gave up his position as chairman of Life and ran as an independent candidate on the SNS candidate list in the 2023 Slovak parliamentary election. He became Minister of Environment on 25 October 2023.

== Personal life ==
Taraba is multilingual, able to speak Slovak, French, German, and English. He is Roman Catholic, is married to his wife Denisa with five children.

== See also ==
- List of members of the National Council of Slovakia, 2020–2023
