= List of members of the National Council of Slovakia, 2016–2020 =

The new National Council of Slovakia was elected in the March 2016 parliamentary election and consisted of 150 representatives elected from party lists.

== Parliamentary officials ==
Officials of the new National Council will be elected at the inaugural session.

== Composition ==
On the basis of the parliamentary election of 2016, the composition of the National Council as of June 2016 is as follows.

=== By political party ===
Party	March 2016	September 2019
Direction – Social Democracy (Smer)	49	48
Freedom and Solidarity (SaS)	21	20
Ordinary People and Independent Personalities (OĽANO) – New Majority (Nova)	19	10
Slovak National Party (SNS)	15	15
People's Party – Our Slovakia (ĽSNS)	14	13
We Are Family (Sme Rodina)	11	8
Most–Híd (Most–Híd)	10	13
Network (SIEŤ)	7	0
Independent	4	8
TOGETHER – Civic Democracy (SPOLU)	0	7
Christian Democratic Movement (KDH)	0	3
For the People (Za ľudí)	0	1
Hungarian Forum (Maďarské fórum/Magyar fórum)	0	1
Progressive Slovakia (PS)	0	1
Voice of the People (Hlas ľudu)	0	1
Christian Union (Kresťanská únia)	0	1
Total	150	150

=== MPs by party ===
Party	Name	Notes
Direction – Social Democracy (49)	Richard Raši	
Direction – Social Democracy (49)	Ján Počiatek	
Direction – Social Democracy (49)	Juraj Blanár	
Direction – Social Democracy (49)	Martin Glváč	
Direction – Social Democracy (49)	Jaroslav Baška	
Direction – Social Democracy (49)	Jana Laššáková	
Direction – Social Democracy (49)	Ľubomír Vážny	
Direction – Social Democracy (49)	Ľubomír Jahnátek	
Direction – Social Democracy (49)	Peter Chudík	
Direction – Social Democracy (49)	Tibor Glenda	
Direction – Social Democracy (49)	Stanislav Kubánek	
Direction – Social Democracy (49)	Vladimír Faič	
Direction – Social Democracy (49)	Dušan Čaplovič	
Direction – Social Democracy (49)	Ján Podmanický	
Direction – Social Democracy (49)	Róbert Madej	
Direction – Social Democracy (49)	Miroslav Číž	
Direction – Social Democracy (49)	Igor Choma	
Direction – Social Democracy (49)	Dušan Galis	
Direction – Social Democracy (49)	Pavol Pavlis	
Direction – Social Democracy (49)	Ladislav Kamenický	
Direction – Social Democracy (49)	Dušan Muňko	
Direction – Social Democracy (49)	Maroš Kondrót	
Direction – Social Democracy (49)	Dušan Jarjabek	
Direction – Social Democracy (49)	Jozef Valocký	
Direction – Social Democracy (49)	Ľuboš Blaha	
Direction – Social Democracy (49)	Ľubomír Petrák	
Direction – Social Democracy (49)	Róbert Puci	
Direction – Social Democracy (49)	Ľubomír Želiezka	
Direction – Social Democracy (49)	Vladimír Matejička	
Direction – Social Democracy (49)	Ján Senko	
Direction – Social Democracy (49)	Jana Vaľová	
Direction – Social Democracy (49)	Dušan Bublavý	
Direction – Social Democracy (49)	Jozef Burian	
Direction – Social Democracy (49)	Jozsef Buček	Replaced Robert Fico who remained Prime Minister
Direction – Social Democracy (49)	Emil Ďurovčík	Replaced Robert Kaliňák who remained in the Government
Direction – Social Democracy (49)	Pavol Goga	Replaced Peter Pellegrini who joined the Government
Direction – Social Democracy (49)	Ján Kvorka	Replaced Miroslav Lajčák who remained in the Government
Direction – Social Democracy (49)	Mária Janíková	Replaced Peter Kažimír who remained in the Government
Direction – Social Democracy (49)	Peter Šuca	Replaced Marek Maďarič who remained in the Government
Direction – Social Democracy (49)	Michal Bagačka	Replaced Peter Žiga who remained in the Government
Direction – Social Democracy (49)	Augustín Hambálek	Replaced Ján Richter who remained in the Government
Direction – Social Democracy (49)	Peter Náhlik	Replaced Viktor Stromček who joined the Government
Direction – Social Democracy (49)	Oľga Nachtmannová	Replaced Erik Tomáš who joined the Government
Direction – Social Democracy (49)	Marián Kéry	Replaced Igor Federič who remained in the Government
Direction – Social Democracy (49)	Mikuláš Krajkovič	Replaced Denisa Saková who joined the Government
Direction – Social Democracy (49)	Milan Panáček	Replaced Marián Saloň who remained in the Government
Direction – Social Democracy (49)	Vladimír Baláž	Replaced Monika Jankovská who remained in the Government
Direction – Social Democracy (49)	Jozef Ježík	Replaced Vojtech Ferencz who remained in the Government
Direction – Social Democracy (49)	Martin Nemky	Replaced Branislav Ondruš who joined the Government
Freedom and Solidarity (21)	Lucia Nicholsonová	
Freedom and Solidarity (21)	Jozef Mihál	
Freedom and Solidarity (21)	Ľubomír Galko	
Freedom and Solidarity (21)	Martin Poliačik	
Freedom and Solidarity (21)	Jana Kiššová	
Freedom and Solidarity (21)	Peter Osuský	
Freedom and Solidarity (21)	Martin Klus	
Freedom and Solidarity (21)	Eugen Jurzyca	
Freedom and Solidarity (21)	Juraj Droba	
Freedom and Solidarity (21)	Ondrej Dostál	
Freedom and Solidarity (21)	Jozef Rajtár	
Freedom and Solidarity (21)	Karol Galek	
Freedom and Solidarity (21)	Alojz Baránik	
Freedom and Solidarity (21)	Natália Blahová	
Freedom and Solidarity (21)	Renata Kaščáková	
Freedom and Solidarity (21)	Miroslav Ivan	
Freedom and Solidarity (21)	Anna Zemanová	
Freedom and Solidarity (21)	Branislav Gröhling	
Freedom and Solidarity (21)	Milan Laurenčík	
Freedom and Solidarity (21)	Vladimír Sloboda	
Freedom and Solidarity (21)	Jana Bittó Cigániková	Replaced Richard Sulík who remained MEP.
Ordinary People and Independent Personalities – New Majority (19)	Igor Matovič	
Ordinary People and Independent Personalities – New Majority (19)	Daniel Lipšic	
Ordinary People and Independent Personalities – New Majority (19)	Veronika Remišová	
Ordinary People and Independent Personalities – New Majority (19)	Alan Suchánek	
Ordinary People and Independent Personalities – New Majority (19)	Marek Krajčí	
Ordinary People and Independent Personalities – New Majority (19)	Oto Žarnay	
Ordinary People and Independent Personalities – New Majority (19)	Erika Jurinová	
Ordinary People and Independent Personalities – New Majority (19)	Richard Vašečka	
Ordinary People and Independent Personalities – New Majority (19)	Jozef Viskupič	
Ordinary People and Independent Personalities – New Majority (19)	Eduard Heger	
Ordinary People and Independent Personalities – New Majority (19)	Gábor Grendel	
Ordinary People and Independent Personalities – New Majority (19)	Viera Dubačová	
Ordinary People and Independent Personalities – New Majority (19)	Ján Budaj	
Ordinary People and Independent Personalities – New Majority (19)	Jozef Lukáč	
Ordinary People and Independent Personalities – New Majority (19)	Anna Verešová	
Ordinary People and Independent Personalities – New Majority (19)	Martin Fecko	
Ordinary People and Independent Personalities – New Majority (19)	Soňa Gaborčáková	
Ordinary People and Independent Personalities – New Majority (19)	Silvia Petruchová	
Ordinary People and Independent Personalities – New Majority (19)	Miroslav Sopko	
Slovak National Party (16)	Andrej Danko	
Slovak National Party (16)	Jaroslav Paška	
Slovak National Party (16)	Eva Smolíková	
Slovak National Party (16)	Anton Hrnko	
Slovak National Party (16)	Štefan Zelník	
Slovak National Party (16)	Dušan Tittel	
Slovak National Party (16)	Karol Farkašovský	
Slovak National Party (16)	Jaroslav Ridoško	
Slovak National Party (16)	Stanislav Kmec	
Slovak National Party (16)	Magdaléna Kuciaňová	
Slovak National Party (16)	Tibor Bernaťák	
Slovak National Party (16)	Peter Pamula	
Slovak National Party (16)	Radovan Baláž	
Slovak National Party (16)	Eva Antošová	
Slovak National Party (16)	Tibor Jančula	Replaced Rudolf Urbanovič who joined the Government
Slovak National Party (16)	Alena Bašistová	Elected in 2016 for the Network.
People's Party – Our Slovakia (14)	Marian Kotleba	
People's Party – Our Slovakia (14)	Martin Beluský	
People's Party – Our Slovakia (14)	Rastislav Schlosár	
People's Party – Our Slovakia (14)	Juraj Kolesár	
People's Party – Our Slovakia (14)	Milan Uhrík	
People's Party – Our Slovakia (14)	Natália Grausová	
People's Party – Our Slovakia (14)	Martin Kotleba	
People's Party – Our Slovakia (14)	Stanislav Drobný	
People's Party – Our Slovakia (14)	Ján Kecskés	
People's Party – Our Slovakia (14)	Stanislav Mizík	
People's Party – Our Slovakia (14)	Peter Krupa	
People's Party – Our Slovakia (14)	Jana Nehézová	
People's Party – Our Slovakia (14)	Milan Mazurek	Replaced Andrej Medvecký who resigned his seat
People's Party – Our Slovakia (14)	Ján Mora	Replaced Ondrej Binder who died on 13 May 2016.
We Are Family (11)	Boris Kollár	
We Are Family (11)	Martina Šimkovičová	
We Are Family (11)	Milan Krajniak	
We Are Family (11)	Peter Marček	
We Are Family (11)	Petra Krištúfková	
We Are Family (11)	Peter Pčolinský	
We Are Family (11)	Zuzana Šebová	
We Are Family (11)	Rastislav Holúbek	
We Are Family (11)	Peter Štarchoň	
We Are Family (11)	Ľudovít Goga	
We Are Family (11)	Adriana Pčolinská	
Most–Híd (10)	Béla Bugár	
Most–Híd (10)	František Šebej	
Most–Híd (10)	Gábor Gál	
Most–Híd (10)	Tibor Bastrnák	
Most–Híd (10)	Peter Kresák	
Most–Híd (10)	Elemér Jakab	
Most–Híd (10)	Gábor Csicsai	Replaced Lucia Žitňanská who joined the Government
Most–Híd (10)	Edita Pfundtner	Replaced László Solymos who joined the Government
Most–Híd (10)	Péter Vörös	Replaced Ivan Švejna who joined the Government
Most–Híd (10)	Irén Sárközy	Replaced Árpád Érsek who joined the Government
Network (7)	Radoslav Procházka	
Network (7)	Andrej Hrnčiar	
Network (7)	Alena Bašistová	On 25 November 2019 has entered the Slovak National Party.
Network (7)	Katarína Cséfalvayová	
Network (7)	Eduard Adamčík	
Network (7)	Igor Janckulík	
Network (7)	Martin Fedor	
Independent (4)	Miroslav Beblavý	Left #NETWORK after the government formation
Independent (4)	Katarína Macháčková	Left #NETWORK after the government formation
Independent (4)	Simona Petrík	Left #NETWORK after the government formation
Independent (4)	Zsolt Simon	Left Most-Híd after the government formation

== Changes ==
Note that a number of MPs who are high-ranking members of parties in the ruling coalition were subsequently appointed to various ministerial and governmental positions. In such cases they are required by Slovak law to put their parliamentary mandate on hold. Those replacements are documented above. The changes which resulted into club changes or occurred after the inauguration of the new government are shown here as well.
