= Miroslav Beblavý =

Slovak politician and economist

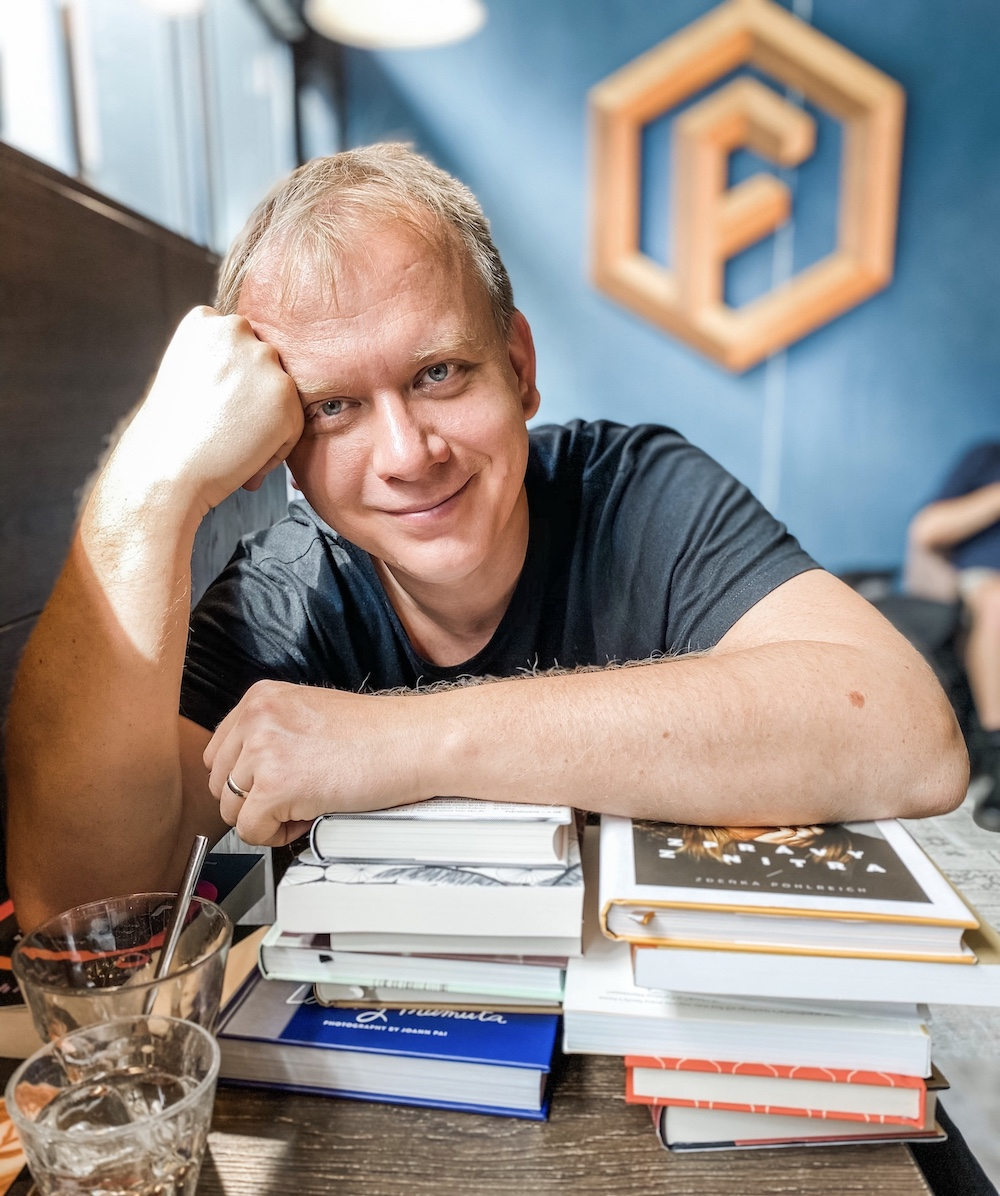

State Secretary at the Ministry of Labor, Social Affairs and Family
- In office 2002–2006

Member of the National Council
- In office 8 July 2010 – 20 March 2020

Personal details
- Born: 6 January 1977 (age 49) Bratislava, Czechoslovakia
- Party: Together – Civic Democracy; Sieť; Slovak Democratic and Christian Union – Democratic Party
- Spouse: Emília Sičáková-Beblavá
- Children: 2
- Education: University of St Andrews; University of Economics in Bratislava; Academy of Performing Arts in Bratislava

Miroslav Beblavý (born 6 January 1977 in Bratislava, Czechoslovakia) is a Slovak investor, startup founder, economist, author and former politician. He is currently CEO of CB ESPRI, an impact investment fund, CEO of Zhiva, a behavioral health startup, and adjunct professor at Sciences Po in Paris and Hertie School in Berlin. He worked with the Ministry of Finance of the Slovak Republic from 2020 to 2021 as a consultant on the Recovery Plan and with the Office of the Government of the Slovak Republic from 2022 to 2023 in the area of innovation policy. Since May 2025, he has served as a jury member for the European Innovation Council (EIC Accelerator). Since March 2026, he has been a member of the Board of Directors of Powerful Medical, a Slovak-American startup in the field of artificial intelligence.

Between 2010 and 2020, he served three terms as an MP of the National Council of Slovakia. Between 2002 and 2006, he held the post of state secretary at the Ministry of Labor, Social Affairs and Family. He was also the chairman of the Together – Civic Democracy party in the 2018-2020 period, co-leading the unsuccessful election coalition with Progressive Slovakia in the 2020 Slovak parliamentary election. He also worked as Senior Research Fellow at Centre for European Policy Studies in Brussels (2011-2019).

== Early life ==
Miroslav Beblavý studied finance at the University of Economics in Bratislava and Theatre Directing at the Academy of Performing Arts in Bratislava, receiving a bachelor's degree from both institutions in 1998. He received his M.Litt. and PhD in economics from the University of St Andrews in 2000 and 2005 respectively.

During his studies, Beblavý worked as an interpreter and journalist. Beblavý was already active in policy debates, covering economic development for the SME newspaper and an analyst for the Institute for Economic and Social Reforms, a think tank. During his PhD studies, he managed another think tank - the Slovak Governance Institute. In addition, over the course of the 2000s to 2010s, Beblavý was active in various consultancy projects for the World Bank, OECD and the European Commission supporting economic and public sector reforms in developing countries.

== Political career ==
=== State secretary ===
In 2002, at the age of 25, Beblavý became State Secretary at the Ministry of Labour, Social Affairs and Family, making him the youngest state secretary in Slovak history. He served under ministers Ľudovít Kaník and Iveta Radičová. Serving as an independent expert rather than a party member, he focused primarily on employment, social benefits and family policy.

Among his key achievements was the introduction of free school meals for children from low-income families. He also reformed the welfare entitlement system to make employment financially more attractive than remaining on unemployment or disability benefits — a policy designed to reduce welfare dependency and incentivise labour market participation.

=== Member of Parliament ===
==== SDKÚ period (2009–2013) ====
Beblavý became a member of the Slovak Democratic and Christian Union – Democratic Party (SDKÚ) in 2009 and got elected MP on the party list in 2010. In the 2010 Slovak parliamentary election, Beblavý ran 25th on the SDKÚ party list, receiving 7,960 preferential votes which moved him up to 14th place. In the National Council, he served as a substitute member of the Committee for European Affairs and as a verifier of the Committee for Education, Science, Youth and Sport. As an MP, he managed to implement several partial reforms such as mandatory online publication of final theses at the Slovak universities and more transparency in allocation of European funding. Transparency International Slovakia ranked Beblavý first among all MPs in its evaluation of the 2010–2012 parliamentary term for anti-corruption voting and legislative initiative. During this term he pushed through the highest number of laws and amendments of any MP, including mandatory online publication of university theses, anti-corruption legislation on public procurement, mandatory publication of information on EU funds, and mandatory publication of vacancies for teaching staff — the latter forming the legislative basis for the edujobs.sk portal.

In the 2012 Slovak parliamentary election Beblavý again ran on the list of SDKÚ, which was at the time heavily implicated in the corruption allegations known as the Gorilla scandal. Beblavý was not personally involved in the scandal, however the party ended up performing poorly in the election losing 17 out of its previously held 28 parliamentary seats. Nonetheless, despite Beblavý running 20th on the SDKÚ list, he received 15,067 preferential votes — the largest upward shift within SDKÚ — moving him to 6th place and securing his mandate, under Slovakia's optional preferential voting system. During this term, Beblavý introduced legislation that triggered competition among banks for mortgage clients, resulting in a significant decline in mortgage interest rates and saving clients tens to hundreds of euros annually.

As a part of that term's opposition, Beblavý raised public awareness about a series of corruption cases involving prominent figures in Slovak public life. These included irregularities linked to a businesswoman known as "teta Anka" (Auntie Anna), Marcel Forai, the head of a state-owned insurance company, a government ministry masseur billing large sums to the state, Ladislav Košecký, who used state funds to pay personal fines, and the head of the Bratislava Stock Exchange. He also pushed through mandatory online publication of VAT refunds, aimed at preventing fraud through excessive VAT deductions.

With regards to the Gorilla scandal Beblavý at first supported the party leadership, while insisting on a thorough investigations of the allegations. However, in 2013 he joined the group of rebel MPs led by Lucia Žitňanská who left the party over its associations with disreputable characters.

==== Independent MP and Sieť period (2013–2016) ====
In 2014, Beblavý joined the newly established Sieť party founded by a fellow MPs Radoslav Procházka a defector from the Christian Democratic Movement and Andrej Hrnčiar who was originally elected on the Most–Híd party list. Beblavý got elected deputy chairman of the new party but unlike the Procházka and Hrnčiar, he did not give up his mandate and remained MP for the rest of the term.

In the 2016 Slovak parliamentary elections, Sieť severely underperformed the polls and with 5.6% of votes barely passed the 5% representation threshold. Beblavý himself, however, retained his seed by running 4th on the Sieť list and received 36,485 preferential votes, moving to 2nd place. In the National Council he became a member of the Foreign Affairs Committee. Soon after the election, Procházka agreed to join the coalition with the Direction – Slovak Social Democracy in spite of promises made before the election. Beblavý considered this alliance a betrayal of the voters and left the party along with two other Sieť MPs - Simona Petrík and Katarína Macháčková.

He founded the initiative Nie v mojom mene (Not in My Name), through which voters could express their disapproval of the decision by Sieť leaders Radoslav Procházka and Andrej Hrnčiar to enter a coalition with Smer. The petition was signed by over 16,000 Sieť members, supporters and voters.

==== Independent MP and Spolu period (2016–2020) ====
In July 2017, Beblavý was named the most inquisitive MP of the term, having asked 68 questions during Question Hour — more than any other MP. Over the course of 2017 and 2018 Beblavý and two other two Sieť rebels teamed up with defector MPs from other parties - Jozef Mihál from the Freedom and Solidarity party and Oto Žarnay from Ordinary People and Independent Personalities to start a new party called Together – Civic Democracy (Spolu). The party Together – Civic Democracy (Spolu) was officially registered on 25 January 2018 after collecting over 18,000 supporting signatures in just three weeks — well above the 10,000 required for registration. At the founding congress held on 14 April 2018 in Poprad, Beblavý was elected party chairman. While leading Spolu, Beblavý remained an active MP, notably leading an initiative to stop import tax fraud scheme, which led to the resignation of the high-profile head of Slovak Financial Administration authority František Imrecze.

Spolu formed an electoral coalition with another newly formed party, Progressive Slovakia. The coalition appeared to have a momentum at first, winning the 2019 European Parliament election with over 20% of the vote. Nonetheless, in underperformed polls in the 2020 Slovak parliamentary election, gaining 6.96% of the vote, just a few hundred votes short of the 7% representation threshold for election coalitions. The party consequently lost all its MP seats, including Beblavý's. Soon after the election, Beblavý, who co-led the list with Progressive Slovakia leader Michal Truban, resigned his party chairmanship and retired from politics. Polls show that PS would have entered parliament without the coalition.

== Life after politics ==
Following the loss of his parliamentary seat in 2020, Beblavý returned to consulting and academic career. Between 2020 and 2021, he served as a consultant to the Slovak Ministry of Finance on the Recovery and Resilience Plan. He also taught at Sciences Po (specifically at the Paris School of International Affairs) in Paris and at the Hertie School in Berlin.

In 2022, he founded CB ESPRI, an impact investment fund targeting companies and NGOs with positive social outcomes. In the same year, he co-founded Zhiva, a digital health startup focused on the behavioural management of chronic diseases, where he serves as Chairman of the Board.

From May 2025, he has served as a jury member of the EIC Accelerator, the European Union's flagship deep-tech startup investment programme. In March 2026, he joined the Board of Directors of Powerful Medical, a Slovak-American AI-driven cardiac diagnostics company whose product PMcardio holds FDA Breakthrough Device designation.

== Personal life ==
Beblavý has been married to Emília Sičáková-Beblavá since 2002, who was the founding president of Transparency International Slovakia and is currently a professor at the Institute of Public Policy at the Faculty of Social and Economic Sciences of Comenius University. They have two sons, Pavol (2004) and Ján (2009).

== Academic career ==
In 2000, he began teaching externally at the Faculty of Arts of Comenius University in Bratislava. He later co-founded the Institute of Public Policy at the Faculty of Social and Economic Sciences at the Comenius University, having taught there until 2014. During this period, he was appointed Associate Professor of Public Policy in 2010.

Between 2011 and 2019, he served as Senior Research Fellow and Head of the Jobs and Skills Unit at Centre for European Policy Studies (CEPS) in Brussels, where he led research on European labour market analysis and the feasibility of a European unemployment benefits scheme. NEUJOBS and EESDA were two of several large-scale projects coordinated under his supervision, funded by the European Commission (FP7 framework, total budget €10.1 million). Between 2021 and 2024, he served as Scientific Coordinator of the European Expert Network on Economics of Education (EENEE).

Since 2022, he has been Adjunct Professor at Sciences Po (specifically at the Paris School of International Affairs) in Paris and at the Hertie School in Berlin, where he teaches courses in economic policy, social policy and policy analysis.

Since 2020, he has been a columnist for SME Daily. In November 2020, his book Nová šľachta: Papalášstvo od Mečiara po Matoviča (The New Nobility: Cronyism from Mečiar to Matovič) was published by Ikar.

According to Google Scholar, his work has received over 2,800 citations, with an h-index of 28.

=== Selected publications ===
- Using online vacancies and web surveys to analyse the labour market: a methodological inquiry. LM Kureková, M Beblavý, A Thum-Thysen. IZA Journal of Labor Economics 4(1), 18. 2015.
- Benefits of early childhood education and care and the conditions for obtaining them. M Vandenbroeck, K Lenaerts, M Beblavý. 2018.
- The Platform Economy and Industrial Relations: Applying the old framework to the new reality. Z Kilhoffer, K Lenaerts, M Beblavý. CEPS Research Report. 2017.
- A European Unemployment Benefits Scheme: The rationale and the challenges ahead. M Beblavý, G Marconi, I Maselli. CEPS Papers. 2015.
- Employers' skill preferences across Europe: Between cognitive and non-cognitive skills. L Mýtna Kureková, M Beblavý, C Haita, AE Thum. Journal of Education and Work 29(6), 662–687. 2016.

=== Books ===
Beblavý is the author or co-author of over a dozen books spanning monetary policy, public administration reform, social policy, labour markets and Slovak politics. Publications are listed chronologically by date

- Hospodárska politika na Slovensku 1990–1999 (Economic Policy in Slovakia 1990–1999). Centrum pre spoločenskú a mediálnu analýzu, Bratislava, 2000. Co-edited with Andrej Marcinčin.
- Manuál pre tvorbu verejnej politiky (Manual for Public Policy Making). Inštitút pre dobre spravovanú spoločnosť, Prešov, 2002. Co-authored with Martina Kubánová and Andrej Salner.
- Inštitucionálne dilemy pri zabezpečení verejných služieb (Institutional Dilemmas in Public Service Provision). Transparency International Slovensko, Bratislava, 2006. Co-authored with Emília Sičáková-Beblavá.
- Monetary Policy in Central Europe. Routledge, London, 2007. (Published doctoral dissertation).
- Sociálna politika (Social Policy). Adin, Prešov, 2009.
- Kontrahovanie služieb vo verejnom sektore (Contracting of Services in the Public Sector). Transparency International Slovensko, Bratislava, 2010. Co-authored with Beáta Meričková, Juraj Nemec and Emília Sičáková-Beblavá.
- The Euro Area and the Financial Crisis. Cambridge University Press, New York, 2011. Co-edited with Ľudovít Ódor and David Cobham.
- From Selectivity to Universalism: The Political Economy of Pro-Equality Educational Reform. CEPS, Brussels, 2013. Co-edited with Marcela Veselková.
- Let's Get to Work! The Future of Labour in Europe. CEPS, Brussels, 2014. Co-authored with Ilaria Maselli and Marcela Veselková.
- Making the State Work: Lessons from 20 Years of Public Administration Reforms in Central and Eastern Europe and the Former Soviet Union. UNDP, New York, 2015. Co-authored with Emília Sičáková-Beblavá.
- Green, Pink & Silver? The Future of Labour in Europe. CEPS, Brussels, 2015. Co-authored with Ilaria Maselli and Marcela Veselková.
- An Overview of European Platforms: Scope and Business Models. Publications Office of the European Union, Luxembourg, 2017. Co-authored with Brian Fabo, Zachary Kilhoffer and Karolien Lenaerts.
- A European Unemployment Benefit Scheme: The Rationale and the Challenges Ahead. Publications Office of the European Union, Luxembourg, 2017. Co-authored with Gabriele Marconi and Ilaria Maselli.
- Index of Readiness for Digital Lifelong Learning: Changing How Europeans Upgrade Their Skills. CEPS, Brussels, 2019. Co-authored with Sara Baiocco, Zachary Kilhoffer, Mehtap Akgüç and Manon Jacquot.
- Nová šľachta: Papalášstvo od Mečiara po Matoviča (The New Nobility: Cronyism from Mečiar to Matovič). Ikar, Bratislava, 2020.
