= Poliačik =

Poliačik, female Poliačiková, is a Slovak surname. Notable people with the surname include:

- Dušan Poliačik (born 1955), Slovak weightlifter
- Martin Poliačik (born 1980), Slovak politician
