= Transparency International (disambiguation) =

Transparency International is an international umbrella organization based in Berlin, Germany.

It may also refer to the national member organizations of Transparency International:

- Transparency International Bangladesh
- Transparency International Canada
- Transparency International Slovakia
