= Opinion polling for the 2016 Slovak parliamentary election =

In the run up to the 2016 Slovak parliamentary election, various organisations carry out opinion polling to gauge voting intention in Slovakia. Results of such polls are displayed in this article.

The date range for these opinion polls are from the previous parliamentary election, held on 5 March 2016, to the present day.

A local regression graph of all polls conducted

== Party vote ==
Date	Polling firm	Sample size	Smer	SIEŤ	KDH	Most–Híd	OĽaNO	SNS	SMK–MKP	SaS	NOVA	SDKÚ–DS	Others	Lead
10 Feb-14 Feb	MVK	1,136	32.5%	14.5%	9.0%	7.0%	5.0%	10.5%	5.0%	4.0%	w.OĽaNO	1.0%	11.7%	18.0%
6 Feb-14 Feb	Polis	1,670	38.4%	10.4%	6.6%	9.2%	6.8%	9.1%	4.0%	5.2%	w.OĽaNO	1.3%	9.0%	28.0%
6 Feb-14 Feb	Focus	1,005	34.6%	14.0%	7.0%	8.2%	6.1%	8.7%	3.5%	5.5%	w.OĽaNO	1.0%	8.9%	20.6%
31 Jan-7 Feb	Focus	1,000	34.1%	13.7%	7.5%	8.0%	6.4%	8.1%	3.6%	5.1%	w.OĽaNO	1.7%	11.8%	20.4%
22-31 Jan	Focus	1,009	36.3%	13.0%	7.1%	7.7%	6.4%	7.3%	3.8%	5.5%	w.OĽaNO	1.7%	11.2%	23.3%
22-28 Jan	MVK	1,148	32.1%	14.6%	8.2%	6.0%	5.9%	10.1%	5.1%	3.4%	w.OĽaNO	1.6%	13.0%	17.5%
11-14 Jan	AKO	1,000	40.7%	8.1%	5.6%	7.9%	5.7%	7.4%	—N/a	6.2%	w.OĽaNO	—N/a	18.4%	33.9%
28 Dec-8 Jan	MVK	1,089	34.5%	14.7%	8.6%	6.5%	5.0%	10.1%	5.1%	3.4%	w.OĽaNO	2.0%	10.1%	19.8%
2016
24 Nov-1 Dec	AKO	1,000	42.2%	8.3%	7.9%	10.4%	5.7%	9.7%	—N/a	6.2%	w.OĽaNO	—N/a	9.6%	31.8%
14-21 Nov	MVK	1,270	36.0%	14.9%	10.1%	6.7%	6.6%	6.8%	4.4%	3.7%	w.OĽaNO	2.8%	6.4%	21.1%
8–14 Nov	Polis	1,305	40.1%	12.6%	7.7%	7.8%	6.6%	8.5%	5.3%	4.0%	w.OĽaNO	2.8%	4.6%	27.5%
3-11 Nov	Focus	1,034	39.0%	12.9%	7.7%	7.0%	6.6%	6.0%	4.1%	5.2%	w.OĽaNO	3.0%	8.5%	28.1%
14 Oct-11 Nov	Median	1,217	40.8%	8.9%	8.1%	7.1%	8.0%	6.3%	4.2%	5.7%	w.OĽaNO	3.2%	7.7%	31.1%
29 Oct–4 Nov	AKO	1,000	41.0%	9.7%	6.3%	9.9%	5.6%	8.2%	3.4%	5.0%	w.OĽaNO	3.9%	7.0%	31.1%
6-14 Oct	Focus	1,032	39.1%	12.6%	7.1%	7.3%	6.7%	6.1%	4.2%	5.2%	w.OĽaNO	2.8%	8.9%	26.5%
26 Sep–2 Oct	MVK	1,085	40.0%	8.3%	10.8%	6.9%	4.3%	7.6%	5.0%	3.7%	w.OĽaNO	1.7%	11.7%	29.2%
1-9 Sep	Focus	1,031	37.7%	11.4%	8.2%	7.1%	8.0%	6.4%	4.1%	5.4%	w.OĽaNO	2.2%	9.5%	26.3%
20 Jul–16 Aug	Median	1,031	39.9%	8.3%	9.3%	6.8%	6.6%	7.6%	4.6%	4.8%	w.OĽaNO	3.5%	8.6%	30.6%
28 Jul–4 Aug	Focus	1,017	34.6%	11.9%	8.8%	7.5%	8.1%	7.0%	4.2%	5.1%	w.OĽaNO	2.2%	10.6%	22.7%
22–29 Jul	Median	1,031	38.4%	10.2%	9.0%	5.6%	7.8%	8.0%	3.7%	4.7%	w.OĽaNO	3.7%	7.9%	28.2%
12–18 Jul	Polis Slovakia	1,463	35.0%	12.1%	7.9%	8.1%	8.9%	8.3%	5.1%	4.5%	w.OĽaNO	1.8%	8.3%	22.9%
8–14 Jun	Polis Slovakia	1,469	34.8%	11.8%	8.4%	8.8%	6.9%	8.1%	5.0%	4.3%	3.0%	1.4%	7.5%	23.0%
2–10 Jun	Focus	1,018	35.3%	10.9%	9.5%	7.8%	7.7%	6.4%	4.3%	4.6%	2.5%	2.4%	8.6%	24.4%
5–13 May	Focus	1,067	33.2%	10.7%	9.4%	7.4%	7.8%	7.3%	5.4%	5.0%	2.4%	2.3%	9.1%	22.5%
4–11 May	Polis Slovakia	1,402	35.3%	10.8%	8.3%	8.4%	7.9%	8.0%	5.5%	3.9%	2.4%	2.0%	7.7%	24.5%
11–18 Apr	Polis Slovakia	1,417	34.7%	10.1%	10.5%	8.7%	7.2%	6.8%	5.2%	4.0%	2.4%	2.5%	7.9%	24.2%
31 Mar–8 Apr	Focus	1,027	37.4%	10.9%	9.9%	7.2%	7.0%	5.7%	4.0%	5.3%	2.3%	3.2%	7.1%	26.5%
20–27 Mar	eCall Slovakia	1,266	35.6%	12.6%	8.3%	9.9%	7.5%	6.4%	3.8%	5.1%	2.6%	3.2%	5.0%	23%
17–23 Mar	Polis Slovakia	1 448	37.7%	9.3%	8.0%	8.0%	8.8%	6.2%	4.7%	3.8%	2.8%	2.2%	8.5%	28.4%
3–10 Mar	MVK	1,106	38.8%	7.8%	11.5%	7.1%	7.7%	5.1%	5.4%	2.6%	2.0%	3.5%	8.5%	27.3%
9–18 Feb	Polis Slovakia	1,472	36.8%	10.1%	7.3%	8.6%	6.7%	7.2%	4.6%	4.2%	3.1%	3.1%	8.3%	26.7%
27 Jan–3 Feb	Focus	1,010	35.5%	11%	10.9%	7%	6%	5.7%	4.6%	4.4%	3.3%	2.8%	8.8%	24.5%
12–18 Jan	Polis Slovakia	1,410	37.4%	11.3%	7.9%	7.9%	7.7%	5.7%	5.7%	3.9%	2.4%	2.5%	7.6%	26.1%
2015
1–7 Dec	Polis Slovakia	1,463	38.3%	11.9%	8.2%	7.8%	8.4%	5.2%	5.1%	3.9%	2.4%	3.1%	5.7%	26.4%
1–7 Nov	MVK	1,125	38.8%	11.9%	12.2%	6.2%	6.9%	3.9%	4.5%	3.7%	3.1%	3.9%	4.9%	26.6%
4 Aug	Focus	1,051	36.8%	10.6%	9.7%	7.1%	7.8%	3.8%	5.2%	4.2%	3.2%	4.9%	8.5%	26.2%
31 Jul	Polis Slovakia	1,128	35.8%	16.4%	7.7%	8.3%	5.5%	4.0%	6.0%	3.8%	2.9%	3.9%	5.7%	19.4%
1 Jul	Polis Slovakia	1,322	35.3%	17.2%	7.9%	7.8%	4.9%	3.9%	6.0%	3.9%	3.0%	4.8%	5.3%	18.1%
23 Jun	Focus	1,025	32.2%	15.8%	9.3%	5.0%	7.6%	2.4%	5.1%	5.5%	3.4%	5.1%	8.1%	16.4%
2 Jun	Polis Slovakia	1,603	36.4%	Did not exist	8.1%	7.6%	6.2%	3.9%	5.7%	4.3%	3.4%	4.7%	4.3%	21.0%
24 May	European elections	576,437	24.1%	Did not exist	13.2%	5.8%	7.5%	3.6%	6.5%	6.7%	6.8%	7.8%	16.9%	11.1%
20 May	Focus	1,037	34.6%	Did not exist	9.9%	5.1%	5.3%	4.3%	5.0%	4.1%	4.9%	5.3%	24.5%	24.7%
19 May	Median	998	42.2%	Did not exist	7.9%	5.4%	10.5%	4.7%	4.7%	6.7%	4.1%	7.7%	6.2%	31.7%
6 May	Polis Slovakia	1,250	38.3%	Did not exist	7.0%	7.9%	7.7%	3.8%	6.3%	3.8%	2.9%	5.0%	17.3%	30.4%
22–28 Mar	Polis Slovakia	1,521	41.5%	Did not exist	9.2%	7.7%	9.0%	3.7%	6.5%	4.8%	3.7%	5.8%	8.1%	32.3%
1–5 Mar	Polis Slovakia	1,521	39.0%	Did not exist	7.8%	7.7%	8.5%	-	-	6.5%	-	8.9%	21.6%	30.1%
27 Jan–5 Feb	Focus	1,051	38.1%	Did not exist	12.7%	6.2%	8.0%	3.3%	5.9%	5.4%	4.0%	7.2%	12.3%	25.4%
15–21 Jan	MVK	1,106	38.1%	Did not exist	9.5%	5.9%	9.2%	2.9%	5.5%	3.9%	5.1%	8.9%	12.2%	28.6%
2014
2013
10 Mar 2012	2012 elections	2,553,726	44.4%	Did not exist	8.8%	6.9%	8.6%	4.6%	4.3%	5.9%	Did not exist	6.1%	10.0%	35.6%
