= Emília Sičáková-Beblavá =

Slovak activist (born 1975)

- Born: 2 February 1975 (age 51); Snina, Czechoslovakia
- Spouse: Miroslav Beblavý
- Children: 2

Academic background
- Education: University of Economics in Bratislava

Academic work
- Discipline: Public Policy
- Institutions: Comenius University in Bratislava

Emília Sičáková-Beblavá (born 1975 in Snina, Czechoslovakia) is a professor of Public Policy at the Comenius University in Bratislava and an authors. She is a prominent anti-corruption activist and a former head of the Slovak chapter of the Transparency International. Currently, she is a professor at the Institute of Public Policy, Department of Faculty of Social and Economic Sciences of the Comenius University in Bratislava. In 2022, she published a book of short stories from her region of birth - Zemplín, with title "Korene" (Roots). In 2025, she published a second book, novella from Eastern Slovakia about a real case of civic resistance to a waste dump project during the Communist times. It is called "Smetisko" ("Waste Dump") and was likened by a reviewer to "Erin Brockovich of Slovakia".

== Education ==
Sičáková-Beblavá holds a PhD from the University of Economics in Bratislava. Her dissertation focused on the role of multilateral institutions in fighting corruption. During her doctoral studies she was a Yale University World Fellow and participated in the Young Global Leaders training at Harvard.

== Career ==
In 1998, Sičáková co-founded the Slovak chapter of Transparency International, and was a member of its worldwide Executive Board from 2001 until 2004. In 2004, she was one of the co-founders of the Public Policy Department at the Comenius University in Bratislava, which is now the Institute of Public Policy. Since 2016 she has served as the director of the Institute.

== Personal life ==
She is married to Miroslav Beblavý, a former politician. They have two sons.
