= Martin Klus =

Slovak politician (born 1980)

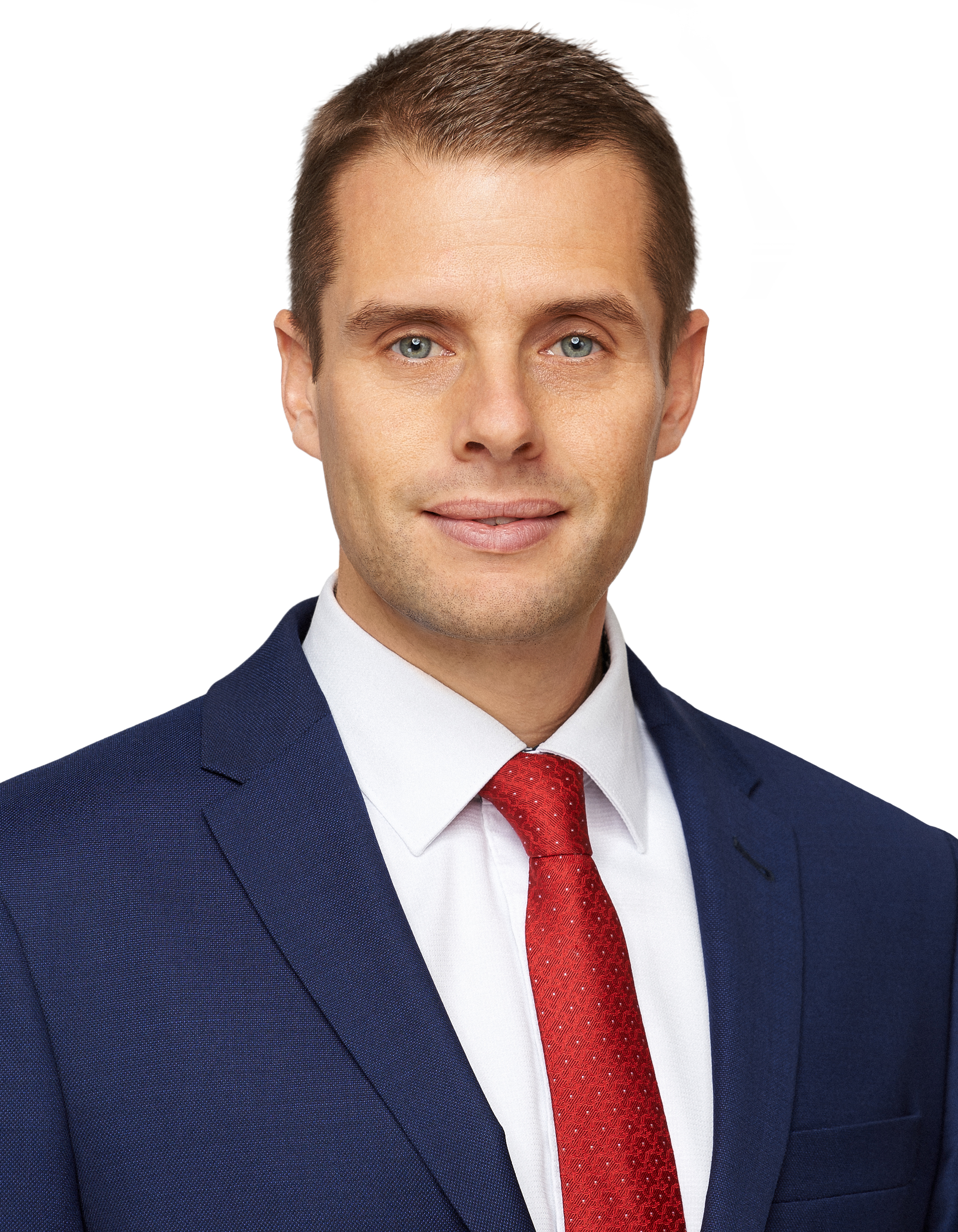

Deputy Speaker of the National Council
- In office 16 October 2019 – 20 March 2020 Serving with Béla Bugár, Martin Glváč and Andrej Hrnčiar
- Speaker: Andrej Danko
- Preceded by: Lucia Ďuriš Nicholsonová

Member of the National Council
- In office 23 March 2016 – 25 October 2023

Personal details
- Born: 8 June 1980 (age 45) Banská Bystrica, Czechoslovakia (now Slovakia)
- Party: SaS (2014 – 2022)
- Education: Matej Bel University
- Occupation: political scientist and politician
- Website: martinklus.sk

Martin Klus (born 8 June 1980) is a Slovak academic, commentator, politician and political theorist.

Since 1999, Klus has been engaged in not only the non-profit sector with the aim to empower civic and studied participation in public affairs, but also educational and urban environment improving activities. He often takes part in political referendum legislation. professional

== Early life and education ==
Klus received master degree at the Faculty of Humanistics, University of Trnava in 1998. He finished in 2003 at the Faculty of Political Sciences and International Relations of Matej Bel University in Banská Bystrica. Between 2013 and 2014, Klus was ranked among the most cited Slovak political scientists and sociologists.

Since 2015, Klus has been assistant professor at the Faculty of Philosophy, University of Trnava.

== Political career ==
=== 2010s ===
In the 2010 Slovak political reform referendum, Klus achieved 1056 votes in Banská Bystrica's 7th precinct and became the first substitute representative, one place ahead of Marian Kotleba. On 15 November 2014, he achieved the highest vote in Rudlová-Sásova precinct, gaining 1734 votes. In December 2014, Klus announced his affiliation with the Freedom and Solidarity political party, advising on foreign policy and political systems. He later resigned the vice-rector seat of Matej Bel University.

Klus ran for 2016 Slovak parliamentary election as a candidate of Freedom and Solidarity, receiving 21,513 votes of preference which ensured him the seat of Member of the National Council of Slovakia. He later served as the Vice Chairman of the National Council European Affairs Committee and Member of the National Council Foreign Affairs Committee.

On 31 March 2017, Klus announced his campaign for the Governor of Banská Bystrica Region in the 2017 Slovak regional elections. The same year in June, he gained broad support of the opposition parties including Freedom and Solidarity, OĽaNO, Nova, Christian Democratic Movement, and Civic Conservative Party. Based on pre-election polls, Klus dropped out of the race in favor of Ján Lunter on 3 October, who defeated Marian Kotleba.

=== 2020s ===
From the parliamentary elections in 2020 until the ministerial resignations of SaS in Cabinet of Eduard Heger, Klus served as the State Secretary of the Ministry of Foreign and European Affairs. He returned to the National Council in September 2022, but quit the following October due to not being able to align himself with what the party stands for any longer. On 1 December, SaS members of parliament put forth a motion of no confidence, to which Klus officially announced his departure from said political party.

A few days after the announcement, Klus' former colleague in SaS, Marián Viskupič, revealed that his split from the party had solved in an amicable way and Klus was about to opt out of the nationwide politics. In 2023 Slovak parliamentary election, Klus ran on We Are Family party list from 150th position.
