= Natália Grausová =

Slovak physician and politician

Member of the National Council
- In office 23 March 2016 – 20 March 2020

Personal details
- Born: Natália Kudzejová; 4 December 1953 (age 72) Bratislava, Czechoslovakia
- Party: People's Party Our Slovakia
- Education: Comenius University

Natália Grausová (née Kudzejová; born 4 December 1953) is a Slovak physician and politician. She was a Member of the National Council from 2016 to 2020.

Natália Grausová was born as Natália Kudzejová on 4 December 1953 in Bratislava. She studied medicine at the Comenius University, graduating in 1978.

In 2016 Slovak parliamentary election, she was elected on the list of the far-right People's Party Our Slovakia. As a Member of Parliament she repeatedly participated on memorial events celebrating World War II era president of Slovakia and convinced war criminal Jozef Tiso. She also fought against Istanbul Convention to prevent violence against women, arguing it would "endanger the white race". Her statement was criticized as racist by an other MPs.

After failing to retain her mandate in the 2020 Slovak parliamentary election, Grausová worked as an aide for the People's Party Our Slovakia deputy Magdaléna Sulanová.
