= Alojz Baránik =

Slovak lawyer and politician (born 1954)

Member of the National Council
- Incumbent
- Assumed office 23 March 2016

Personal details
- Born: 13 June 1954 (age 72) Bratislava, Czechoslovakia
- Party: Freedom and Solidarity
- Education: Comenius University

Alojz Baránik (born 13 June 1954) is a Slovak lawyer and politician. Since 2016, he has served as a Member of the National Council representing the Freedom and Solidarity (SaS) party.

== Early life ==
Baránik was born in Bratislava. In 1972, he enrolled to study law at the Charles University, but transferred to the Comenius University the following year, where he graduated in law. Following his graduation, Baránik worked as an in-house counsel for an industrial company in Bratislava for three years.

In 1982, he emigrated to Canada, where he worked as a taxi driver and real estate agent. In 1992 he returned to Czechoslovakia to take the role of the lead legal counsel for Central and Eastern Europe at the Digital Equipment Corporation. After the bankruptcy of the company in 1998, he returned to his home town in Bratislava and became an attorney.

== Political career ==
In the 2016 Slovak parliamentary election, Baránik was elected to the parliament on the list of the SaS party. He retained his seat in the 2020 Slovak parliamentary election. As an MP, he has entered numerous high-profile disputes with judges as well as the prosecutor general Maroš Žilinka.
