= Jana Kiššová =

Slovak politician

Member of the National Council
- In office 1 July 2014 – 20 March 2020
- In office 8 July 2010 – 3 April 2012

Personal details
- Born: 23 November 1974 (age 51) Bratislava, Czechoslovakia
- Party: Freedom and Solidarity
- Spouse: Jozef Boskovič
- Education: University of Economics in Bratislava

Jana Kiššová (born 23 November 1974) is a Slovak manager and former politician. In 2010-2012 and again in 2014-2020 she served as a member of the National Council elected on the Freedom and Solidarity party ballot.

== Early life ==
Kiššová was born on 23 November 1974 in Bratislava. She studied Finance at the University of Economics in Bratislava, graduating in 2001. Following her graduation, she worked as a manager in the HR sector.

== Political career ==
Kiššová was among the founding members of Freedom and Solidarity (SaS) in 2009. She was first elected to parliament in 2010. In the 2012 Slovak parliamentary election, she failed to retain to seat. Nonetheless, she returned to parliament in 2014 as a replacement for Richard Sulík who became a Member of the European Parliament. In 2016 Slovak parliamentary election, she retained her seat. However in 2019 she left (SaS) over a conflict with the party leadership and joined a newly founded Democratic Party. Later that year she left the Democratic Party as well and, after 2020 Slovak parliamentary election, retired from politics.

In June 2023 she announced her return to Freedom and Solidarity and the intention to run in the 2023 Slovak parliamentary election.

== Personal life ==
In 2018, she married the businessman Jozef Boskovič.
