= Anna Zemanová =

Slovak ecologist and politician

Member of the National Council
- In office 23 March 2016 – 25 October 2023

Personal details
- Born: 12 September 1959 (age 66) Topoľčany, Czechoslovakia
- Party: Freedom and Solidarity
- Children: 4
- Education: Comenius University

Anna Zemanová (née Sedláková; born 12 September 1959 in Topoľčany) is a Slovak environmentalist, folklorist and politician, who served as a member of the National Council from 2016 to 2023.

== Life outside of politics ==
Zemanová studied geology at the Comenius University, graduating in 1983. She worked on the environmental issues in government and NGO sector.

== Political career ==
Zemanová became involved in politics in the late 1990s. From 2002 to 2006 she served as the mayor of Vajnory borough of Bratislava. In 2012, she joined the Freedom and Solidarity party, which she has represented in parliament since 2016.

== Personal life ==
Zemanová has four children.
