= Martin Poliačik =

Slovak politician

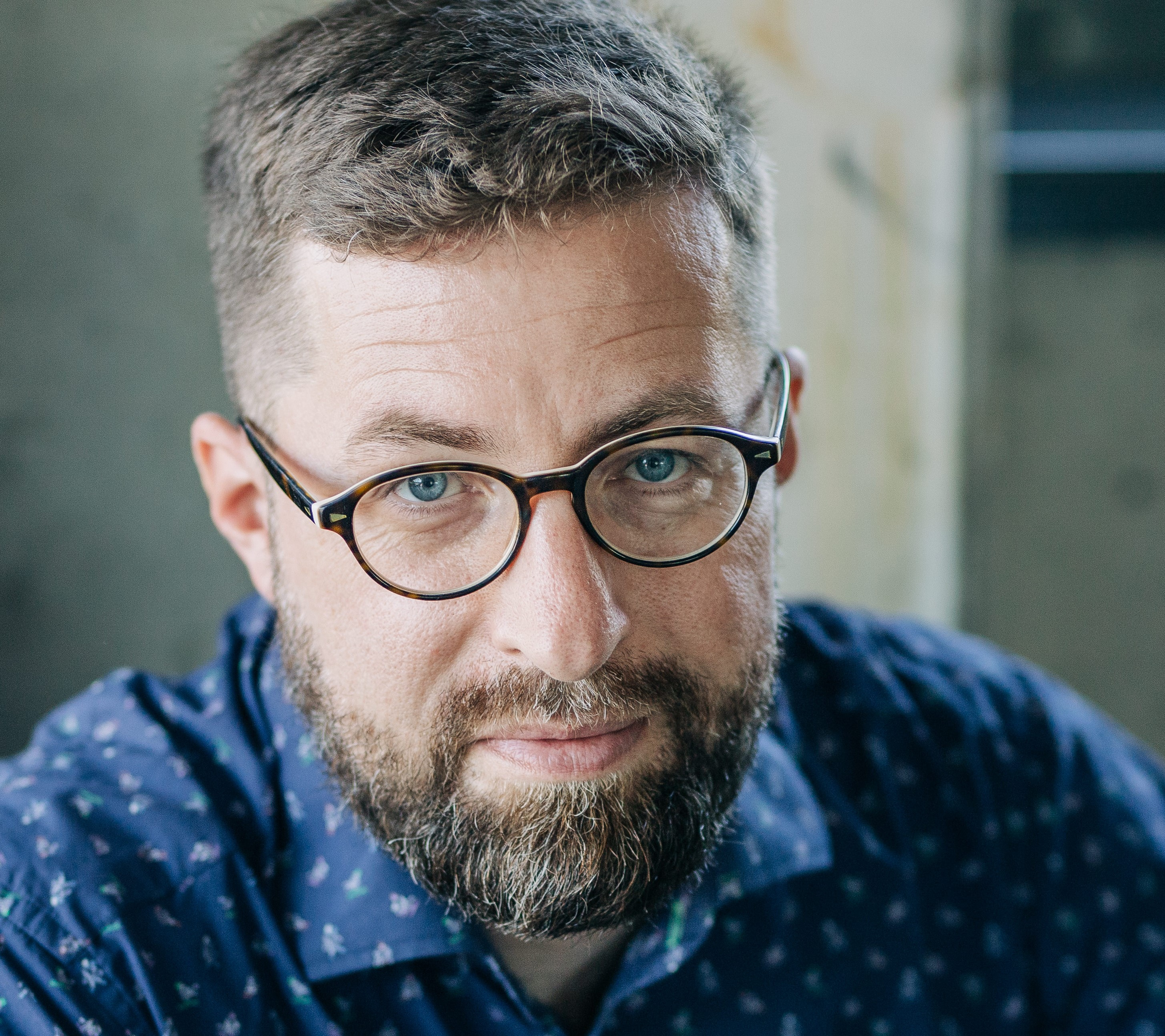

Member of the National Council
- In office 2010–2020

Personal details
- Born: 27 June 1980 (age 46) Považská Bystrica, Czechoslovakia (now Slovakia)
- Party: Progressive Slovakia (2017–present); Freedom and Solidarity (2009–2017)
- Website: http://poliacik.sk/

Martin Poliačik (born 27 June 1980) is a Slovak expert on communication and critical thinking. He is the Director for Strategy and Partnerships at the Emile Foundation. From 2010 to 2020, he was a member of the National Council of the Slovak Republic. He is one of the founding members of the liberal party Progressive Slovakia. He previously co-founded the political party Freedom and Solidarity, which he left in November 2017 due to disagreements with its chairman, Richard Sulík. Poliačik studied systematic philosophy in Trnava, Slovakia. Prior to entering politics, he was a teacher at a Montessori school in Bratislava. From 2003 to 2006, he led the Slovak Debating Association as its executive director. Together with Linda Lančová, Poliačik wrote the book Order in the Head (Critical Thinking for Every Day).

== Political career ==
=== Freedom and Solidarity ===
Martin Poliačik was one of the founders of Freedom and Solidarity in 2009. He was a member of the Republican Council and chairman of the Programme Committee.

==== Electoral Period 2010–2012 ====
In the party's first election to the National Assembly, he ran as the 11th candidate, receiving 4,893 preferential votes, which secured him a parliamentary seat. During this term, he was a member of the Constitutional and Legal Committee and the Committee on Education, Science, Youth, and Sport.

==== Electoral Period 2012–2016 ====
In the 2012 Slovak parliamentary election Poliačik ran from the ninth place on the list of Freedom and Solidarity candidates. He finished eighth place by winning 7,595 preferential votes. He served as a member of the Constitutional Law Committee and the Mandate and Immunity Committee and was the deputy chairman of the party parliamentary club.

==== Electoral period 2016–2020 ====
In the 2016 parliamentary elections he ran as the 8th candidate on the ticket, receiving 45,914 votes and securing a parliamentary seat. He was the chairman of the Committee on the Incompatibility of Functions and a member of the Committee on Education, Science, Youth, and Sport.

In March 2017 Poliačik was elected as one of the twelve members of the party's Republican Council, supported by Richard Sulík, despite their differences.

=== Council of Europe ===
From 2016 to 2020 he served in the Slovak delegation to the Parliamentary Assembly of the Council of Europe. As vice-president of the ALDE faction, he spoke on topics such as Russian voting rights, election rigging in the Russian Federation, and the investigation into the murder of Boris Nemtsov.

Due to his opposition to restoring voting rights to the Russian delegation, Speaker of the National Council of the Slovak Republic Andrej Danko and head of delegation to PACE Ľuboš Blaha, both very pro-Russian, sought his removal from the delegation.

=== Friends of Tibet Club ===
Poliačik led the Friends of Tibet Club in the Slovak Parliament for ten years, welcoming members of the exiled Tibetan parliament, the prime minister of the exiled Tibetan government, and the 14th Dalai Lama to Slovakia. In 2019, he attended the 60th anniversary of the Tibetan national uprising in Dharamshala, India, with then deputy speaker of parliament, Lucia Ďuriš Nicholsonová.

=== Progressive Slovakia ===
In November 2017 Poliačik announced his departure from Freedom and Solidarity due to differences with chairman Richard Sulík, citing inadequate communication of the party's pro-European orientation and support for democracy The same year in December, Poliačik joined Progressive Slovakia, resulting in his dismissal as chair of the Committee on Incompatibility of Functions.

In March 2018 Poliačik became a member of the Committee on Education, Science, Youth, and Sport, and participated as a substitute in the Permanent Delegation to the Parliamentary Assembly of the Council of Europe. After Zuzana Čaputová's election as President of Slovakia, he was elected Vice-Chairman of Progressive Slovakia at the 2019 Congress.

==== Electoral period 2020–2023 ====
In the 2020 Slovak parliamentary election Poliačik ran as the 16th candidate of the PS/Democrats coalition, receiving 10,969 votes but did not secure a seat due to the coalition's overall result During the 2024 European Parliament election in Slovakia, Poliačik ran from 15th place on the Progressive Slovakia ticket for the European Parliament. Progressive Slovakia won six seats, and Poliačik received 13,529 preferential votes, becoming the first alternate.

=== Business activities ===
After retiring from active politics in 2020, Poliačik has been running the family business with his wife, Hana. He is a lecturer at the Academy of Critical Thinking, and their company, Zoras, is dedicated to improving sleep quality.

== Activities in Ukraine ==
After the Russian Federation's full-scale invasion of Ukraine, Poliačik organised a visit of a Ukrainian parliamentary delegation to Slovakia in March 2022. From December 2022 to January 2024, he worked in Kyiv as deputy director of the Ukrainian branch of the international organisation GLOBSEC.

== Ideological beliefs ==
"This claim, however, is nothing new. In Progressive Slovakia, we have said from the beginning that the traditional party divide is coming to an end, and the way forward is through a pragmatic economic centre. Barack Obama used the term inclusive capitalism in his Johannesburg speech. In Europe today, French President Emmanuel Macron, in particular, represents this current. But what is it, and why should we move in the direction of inclusive capitalism?"

— Martin Poliačik

"Inclusive capitalism is the marriage of contradictory political trends. It promotes a right-wing policy of free markets and competition, creates adequate conditions for innovation, and makes it possible to mobilise financial capital from both private and public sources. These sources promote the education of future generations and the entrepreneurial spirit of anyone with a good idea. Inclusive capitalism denies the idea of artificial and unaddressed socialist redistribution of resources. On the contrary, it promotes profit and the ability of people to improve their property status."

— Martin Poliačik

In a blog post for Denník N, Poliačik expressed his centrist, strongly liberal ideological beliefs based on respect for liberal democracy, which he termed inclusive capitalism. He highlighted the importance of free markets, competition, innovation, and the mobilisation of financial capital for education and entrepreneurial endeavours, while rejecting socialist redistribution of resources.
