= Martin Glváč =

Slovak politician

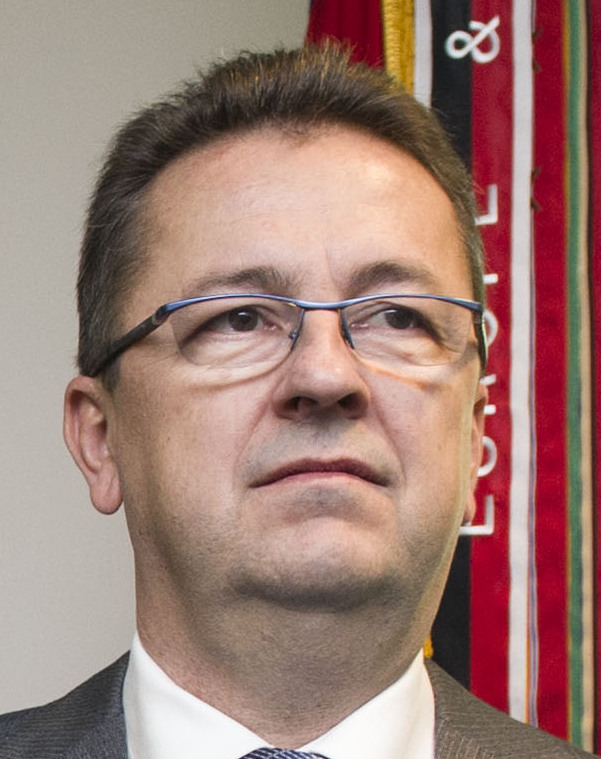
- Martin Glváč (2015)

Minister of Defence
- In office 4 April 2012 – 23 March 2016
- Prime Minister: Robert Fico
- Preceded by: Iveta Radičová (acting)
- Succeeded by: Peter Gajdoš

Deputy Speaker of the National Council
- In office 23 March 2016 – 7 November 2019 Serving with Béla Bugár, Andrej Hrnčiar, Lucia Ďuriš Nicholsonová and Martin Klus
- Speaker: Andrej Danko

Member of the National Council
- In office 23 March 2016 – 20 March 2020

Personal details
- Born: 20 November 1967 (age 58)
- Party: Direction – Slovak Social Democracy
- Children: 1
- Education: Comenius University

Martin Glváč (Note: Slovak pronunciation: [ˈmartiŋ ˈɡl̩ʋaːtʂ]) (born 20 November 1967) is a Slovak politician for the Direction - Social Democracy (Slovak: Smer-SD). He was Minister of Defence in Fico's Second Cabinet from 2012 to 2016. and a Deputy Speaker of the National Council between 2016 and 2020. He did not run again in the 2020 Slovak parliamentary election.

In 2019, Glváč's communication with Marián Kočner, accused and later sentenced of serious crimes, and Kočner's close associate Alena Zsuzsová, who referred to Glváč as "Maznák" ("Cuddler") was leaked, leading to an end of Glváč's political career.
