= Lucia Ďuriš Nicholsonová =

Slovak politician and journalist

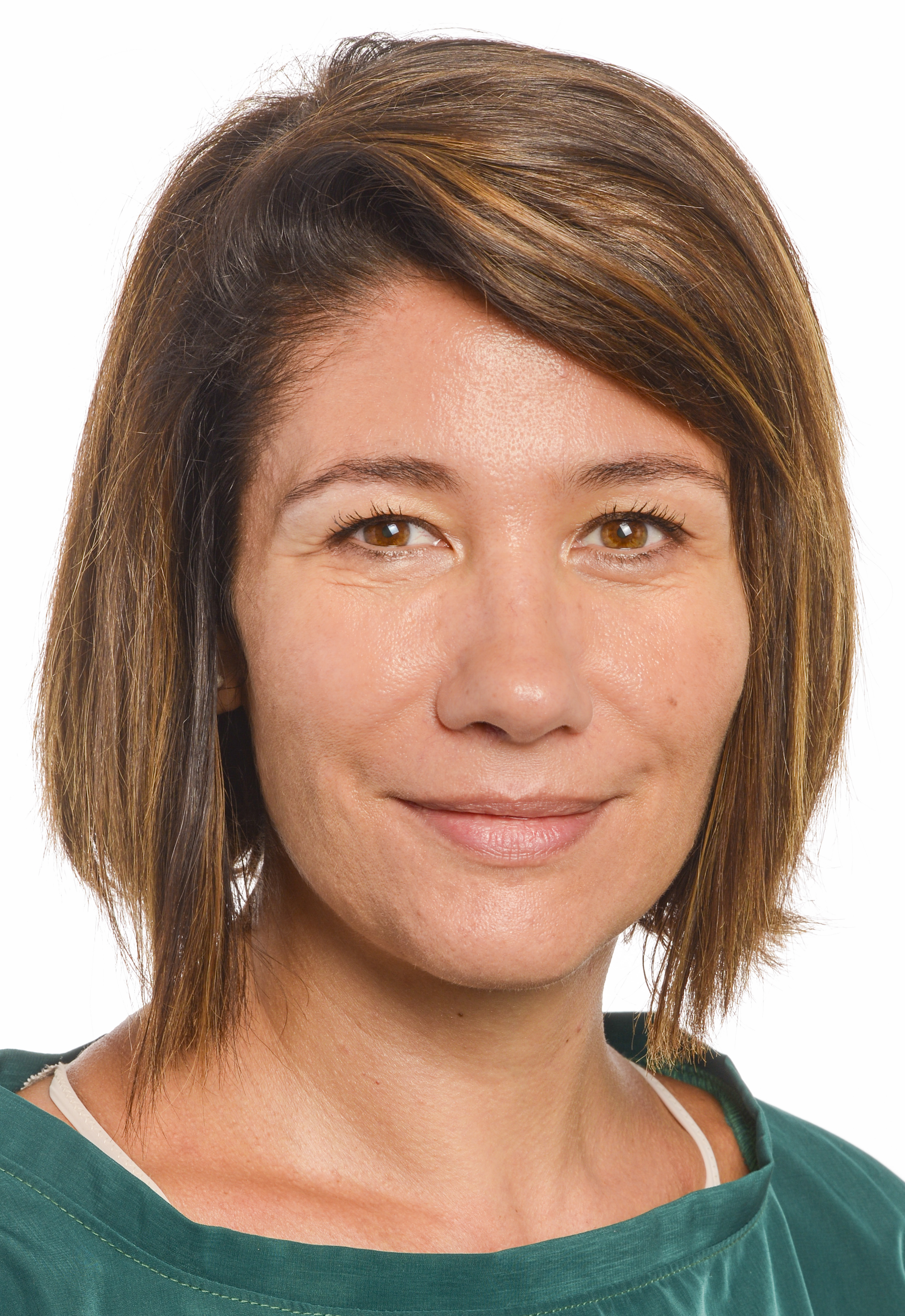

Member of the European Parliament for Slovakia
- In office 2 July 2019 – 15 July 2024

Deputy Speaker of the National Council
- In office 23 March 2016 – 28 June 2019 Serving with Béla Bugár, Martin Glváč and Andrej Hrnčiar
- Speaker: Andrej Danko
- Succeeded by: Martin Klus

Member of the National Council
- In office 23 March 2016 – 28 June 2019

Personal details
- Born: Lucia Kubovičová; 28 November 1976 (age 49) Bratislava, Czechoslovakia (now Slovakia)
- Party: Freedom and Solidarity (2010 - 2021); Jablko (from 2023)
- Spouse(s): Tom Nicholson (div. 2013) Peter Ďuriš (m. 2015)
- Children: 3
- Occupation: Politician
- Profession: Journalist
- Website: https://eurovolby2019.sk/kandidatka-do-europskeho-parlamentu-2019-lucia-duris-nicholsonova/, https://www.lucianicholsonova.sk/

Lucia Ďuriš Nicholsonová (née Kubovičová; born 28 November 1976) is a Slovak politician who served as a Member of the European Parliament between 2019 and 2024. A former journalist, she previously served as State Secretary of the Ministry of Labor, Social and Family Affairs, and vice-chairwoman of the National Council of Slovakia. As a member of the Freedom and Solidarity political party, Nicholsonová was elected as a member of the National Council during the 2010 Slovak parliamentary election, served as State Secretary and later became part of the Social Affairs Committee.

== Early career ==
Under her first married name of Lucia Nicholsonová she worked for at least ten media outlets in Slovakia, whereas her first husband, Tom Nicholson, was also a journalist, working for the Slovak newspaper SME and English-language newspaper The Slovak Spectator.

== Political career ==
=== Career in national politics ===
Ďuriš Nicholsonová became a vice-chairwoman of the National Council in the 2016 elections and programme leader of the Freedom and Solidarity party for socially excluded communities. She has not dealt only with the social area but was also a loud and frequent critic of the government corruption scandals, including corrupted redistribution of euro-funds in agriculture or social and labour policies.

She remarried in June 2016, subsequently being known as Lucia Ďuriš Nicholsonová. She was part of a small delegation from the Slovak parliament to meet the Dalai Lama during his visit to Slovakia in October 2016.

=== Member of the European Parliament, 2019–2024 ===
In May 2019 Ďuriš Nicholsonová became one of the 14 Members of the European Parliament from Slovakia, as her political party Freedom and Solidarity (SaS) won 9.60% of votes, resulting in two mandates. In parliament, she was a member of the European Parliament's Committee on Employment and Social Affairs (EMPL) and the Committee on Civil Liberties, Justice and Home Affairs (LIBE). On 18 July 2019 she was elected as chair of the EMPL Committee.

In addition to her committee assignments, Ďuriš Nicholsonová was part of the European Parliament Intergroup on Trade Unions.

In 2021, Ďuriš Nicholsonová left the European Conservatives and Reformists (ECR) to join the Renew Europe group in Parliament. She was subsequently reelected chair of the EMPL committee, winning 38 votes compared to runner-up Margarita de la Pisa Carrión who won 15 votes.

In 2023, Nicholsonová created the Jablko political party. Her term in the European Parliament ended in 2024.

== Political positions ==
Ďuriš Nicholsonová is well known for the reform she proposed as an opposition politician to improve living conditions of Romani people in Slovakia and prevent their further socio-economic exclusion, consisting of early pre-schooling for children from excluded communities and more effective, specialised and motivational social support and tailored assistance. She has focused on employment and social matters, including rights of persons with disabilities and active ageing, during her European election campaign and praised work–life balance incentives of the European Parliament.

== Personal life ==
Ďuriš Nicholsonová has three children - son Dominik (1999) and daughter Lilly (2008) from her marriage with the journalist Tom Nicholson and another son Jakub (2016) from her second marriage to Peter Ďuriš. Following the end of her MEP mandate, the family chose to remain living in Brussels due to family becoming accustomed to the multicultural society of the city.
