= Radoslav Procházka =

Slovak politician (born 1972)

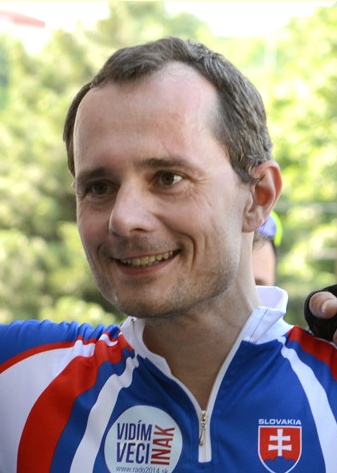
- Radoslav Procházka in 2013

Personal details
- Born: 31 March 1972 (age 54) Bratislava, Czechoslovakia
- Party: Christian Democratic; Movement (before 2013); Independent (2013–2014); Network (2014–2016)
- Spouse: Katarína Procházková
- Children: 2
- Education: Comenius University; Yale University; University of Trnava

Radoslav Procházka (born 31 March 1972) is a Slovak lawyer, former politician and former leader of the political party Sieť. He was an unsuccessful candidate in 2014 Slovak presidential election, running as an independent. As the leader of the party Network, he helped to create the new government of Slovakia following the Parliamentary Election held on 5 March 2016 while joining parties Direction – Social Democracy, Slovak National Party, Most–Híd, while he had claimed before elections to never join party SMER in government and many of his voters voted him as an opposing force to Direction – Social Democracy.

== Early life and education ==
Radoslav Procházka was born on 31 March 1972 in Bratislava, Czechoslovakia (now Slovakia). He attended elementary school between 1978 and 1986 at ZŠ Lumumbova school in Bratislava, after this he entered gymnasium at Gymnázium Laca Novomeského, located on Tomášikova street in Bratislava. After graduating from high school in 1990 he was enrolled in the Comenius University in Bratislava, studying law. After graduating with a law degree in 1995, he worked as a research fellow with the Law faculty, before moving to the United States and completing his post-gradual study at Yale Law School with an LLM in 1998, and a JSD in 2001. He received a PhD degree from the University of Trnava in 2004 and became an associate professor there in 2005.

== Legal career ==
After graduating from his first tenure at Yale, Procházka worked as a lawyer in the Prague branch of the law firm Hogan & Hartson from 1998 to 1999. From 2001 until 2004 he worked as an adviser and a consultant at the Constitutional Court of the Slovak Republic, at the same time he served as a legal counsel to the Slovak delegation to the European Commission. When Slovakia joined the European Union in 2004 he became the first representative of the State before he served as Slovakia's first representative to the European Court of Justice. He resigned from the justice ministry in 2006, when the highly controversial Štefan Harabin was appointed Minister of Justice by Prime Minister Robert Fico.

== Political career ==
In 2010, he was first elected to the Slovak parliament, the National Council of Slovakia while he was a member of the Christian Democratic Movement (KDH). During his first years in parliament, Procházka gained a reputation for being a maverick, breaking with party ranks on several occasions. One notable example was in February 2011 when he voted in favour of the opposition Citizen Act when banned the holding of dual citizenship. This caused fury within his own party, and coalition allies called for his expulsion.

Procházka who, along with Daniel Lipšic and Jana Žitňanská was regarded by observers as the leaders of the party's ‘young wing’ authored in October 2012 the so-called 'Alfa-platform'. In this doctrine, he called for the total abolition of payroll taxes, installing a single social benefit payment, the financing of basic health care from taxes and a constitutional ban on public finance deficit over a period of a single electoral term. Before the parliamentary election in 2012, Procházka, despite being one of the most popular KDH politicians was not offered a significant nomination, and in February 2013 he officially left the party, continuing in parliament as an independent. The party had refused to discuss or implement the changes he had proposed within his Alfa platform. After the meeting, Procházka said he would never again run on the KDH slate.

=== 2014 presidential election ===
He was a candidate in the 2014 Slovak presidential election, but did came in third with 21%, behind Robert Fico and Andrej Kiska, thus he did not make it to the second and final round. In late March 2014, he announced that he would give up his parliamentary seat, after the May parliamentary session. He said he was ready to found a new political party and has a network of people who will join in the project.

=== Leader of Siet' ===
In the aftermath of the 2014 presidential election, Procházka founded, along with Andrej Hrnčiar and Miroslav Beblavý a new political party called Siet' (English: Network), He was officially elected leader of the party on 2 September of that year.

Sieť received 5,6% of the vote in the parliamentary elections which took place on 5 March 2016. Sieť became one of the parties of the government coalition.

=== Leaving politics ===
Procházka did not run for the position of the leader of Sieť again after the 2016 election, instead remaining a regular MP for the party. Shortly after, he announced his complete withdrawal from politics, leaving both his MP seat and party membership.

In 2016, he was an unsuccessful candidate for the position of Judge at the CJEU.

== Personal life ==
Radoslav Procházka is married to civil-rights attorney Katarína Procházková. The couple met while Radoslav was teaching at the University of Trnava and Katarína was a law student there, and she currently heads her own civil rights law firm called Attorneys for the people (Slovak: Pravnici l'udom) providing pro-bono legal aid.

Together they have two children, a son Tadeáš, and a daughter Karolína. They reside in the town of Šamorín, a commuting town 26 kilometers outside of Bratislava.
