= Andrej Hrnčiar =

Slovak politician (born 1973)

Mayor of Martin
- In office 21 December 2006 – 10 November 2018
- Preceded by: Stanislav Bernát
- Succeeded by: Ján Danko

Deputy Speaker of the National Council
- In office 23 March 2016 – 20 March 2020 Serving with Béla Bugár, Martin Glváč, Lucia Ďuriš Nicholsonová and Martin Klus
- Speaker: Andrej Danko

Member of the National Council
- In office 23 March 2016 – 20 March 2020
- In office 4 April 2012 – 20 June 2014

Personal details
- Born: July 10, 1973 (age 53) Ruzomberok, Czechoslovakia
- Party: Independent (2006-2014); SIEŤ (2014-present)
- Spouse: Martina Hrnčiarová
- Children: Two daughters
- Education: Academy of Performing Arts in Bratislava
- Occupation: Politician
- Profession: Actor

Andrej Hrnčiar (Slovak pronunciation: [ˈandrej ˈɦr̩ntʂɪɐr]; born 10 July 1973) is a Slovak professional actor and politician, who has been serving as mayor of the city of Martin since 2006. He had been a professional actor and a restaurant and bar owner before he decided to run in the 2006 mayoral election as an independent.

Hrnčiar was elected a member of the Slovak parliament in 2012 as an independent, but was nominated by and associated with the Hungarian-minority Most-Hid party. He resigned his seat in parliament in June 2014, in order to focus on his mayoral career, and to join the newly formed political party Siet'. He became its deputy leader under Radoslav Procházka.

== Early career ==
After returning to Slovakia from the United States in 1996, he was employed as an actor by the Slovak Chamber Theatre (Slovak: Slovenské komorné divadlo) in the city of Martin. Around the same time, he opened two Jazz themed cafes in the area, with relative success. The Café's, which soon became the focus of the Slovak Jazz scene, attracted patrons such as Peter Lipa, Adriena Bartošová and Laco Déczi. In 2003, when the position as head of the Chamber Theater became open, Hrnčiar applied and was hired.

== Political career ==
=== Mayor of Martin ===
In the 2006 Slovak municipal elections, Hrnčiar decided to run for mayor on an independent ticket. His opponent was incumbent mayor Stanislav Bernát, local strongman candidate, who had won the three previous elections and sitting as mayor since 1994. Hrnciar won the election with 32.6% of the vote, Bernat came in third with 15.2% He introduced an offer of Wi-Fi internet free of charge for every resident in the city, which was ordered by approximately 500 households and considered a success. In the municipal elections in 2010, Hrnčiar ran again and was re-elected to another term, which will last until 2014. In the 2014 Mayoral election, he ran for the first time as an official party nominee, having run the previous times as an independent.

=== Member of National Council of Slovakia ===
In November 2011, Hrnčiar announced his bid for a seat in the National Council of Slovakia. He made the decision, after being approached by the leader of the Most-Hid party Bela Bugar, who offered him a place on his partys electoral ticket. Most-Hid, who represents the Hungarian minority in Slovakia, had been eager to decrease its voter base among Slovaks, and saw the benefit in drafting the popular mayor Hrnčiar. Hrnčiar accepted the offer, but declined membership in the party, thus formally running as an independent.

The campaign turned out to be an ugly one. Hrnčiar received a bullet with his name on it in the mailbox. He had previously received written death threats against himself and his family. Most-Hid ended up receiving 6.89% of the vote, and thus Hrnčiar was elected, along with 12 other MPs including fellow Slovak František Šebej, who Hrnčiar himself had drafted in order to further increase the partys appeal among Slovak voters. Already under fire for receiving a high wage and having multiple jobs as mayor, Hrnčiar was criticized for serving as both Mayor and MP at the same time, thus receiving dual salary, as well as benefits.

In the run-up to the second round of the 2014 presidential election, Hrnčiar endorsed Andrej Kiska for the presidency alongside Radoslav Procházka and Miroslav Beblavy. On 7 April 2014, Hrnčiar confirmed he was leaving the Most-Híd caucus to team up with Procházka. He claims his relations within the caucus are fine, but that he believes that in the two years following the last parliamentary election, the centre-right opposition parties have failed to successfully re-establish themselves. On 12 June 2014, Hrnčiar and Prochazka left gave up their mandates as MPs following the inauguration of president-elect Kiska.

== Personal life ==
Hrnčiar is married to Martina Hrnčiarova, a pediatric nurse from the Orava region. They have two daughters, one of whom – Karin – is an accomplished Equestrian and has participated in national events.
