= Transparency International Slovakia =

Transparency International Slovakia (TIS) is a non-governmental organization (NGO) which was established in 1998 and a member organization of Transparency International. It aims to increase transparency and create a corruption-free world by working together with the private sector, civil society and public sector. Corruption is rife and a major issue in Slovakia. TIS focuses on policies involving local and regional governments to uphold democracy and a free market economy.

== Case study: Privatisation of Slovak Telecom (1999–2000) ==
=== Background of corruption in Slovakia ===
Under the previous heavily corrupted governance (1994–1998), privatization was not a transparent process, leading to many cases of embezzlement. Many private firms were sold at a loss, leading some to bankruptcy and causing negative fiscal impact on the Slovak economy. With the change to a new governance in October 1998, TIS was invited to monitor and increase the transparency level of the privatization process of Slovak Telecom and ultimately, reduce corruption.

=== Goals of the project ===
The main goals of the monitoring of the privatization process of Slovak Telecom in which Transparency International Slovakia participated as an independent observer were:

1. to observe the process in order to increase transparency and minimize the possibility of corruption
2. to raise awareness of the general public about corruption and transparency issues in Slovakia, especially in privatization and public procurement tenders.

=== Actions taken by TIS ===
TIS sought to improve transparency of the process by first forming a tri-party which, together with TIS, helped monitor the entire process, thereby increasing transparency. Observing the process also allowed TIS to brainstorm ideas that would improve transparency. For instance, a major problem identified was with regard to the documentation language. Documents are written only in English, a language of which command is imprecise, hence leaving the document open to interpretation. In addition, TIS published news and information on the privatisation to educate and increase public awareness on transparency issues.

=== Results of the changes ===
Through the media, TIS managed to increase public interest and awareness on issues concerning transparency and anti-corruption. The extent of public participation and media influence was exemplified during the process, through public outcry against corruption that led to the resignation of two corrupt officials, the first of its kind in the country. Realizing the need for a greater transparency level in the privatization process, TIS established and recommended numerous policies for administrative changes. These included:

- “Privatization Information Minimum”
- “Public Procurement Information Minimum”
- Amendment of the Law on Public Procurement
- Working Group on Public Procurement

== Post-evaluation statistics ==
According to two reports, the progress of corruption in Slovakia remains unclear. World Bank statistics show that in the period after the policy implementation, corruption in Slovakia worsened from 0.31 in 2000 to 0.13 in 2002, thereafter the corruption index showed a general upward trend of an increase of the index by 0.3 points by 2008. On the other hand, Transparency International statistics show that after 2000, corruption has been steadily decreasing in the country from 3.5 in 2000 to 4.98 in 2008 signaling a decrease by 1.48 index points.

== See also ==
- Corruption Perceptions Index
- Privatization in Slovakia
