= Slovak Conservative Party =

Slovak Conservative Party Slovenská konzervatívna strana
- Abbreviation: SKS
- Leader: Ivan Zuzula
- Founder: Radoslav Procházka
- Founded: 12 June 2014
- Dissolved: 20 December 2022
- Merged into: Christian Democratic Movement
- Headquarters: Bratislava
- Membership (2020): 1,231
- Ideology: Liberal conservatism Christian democracy Social conservatism Economic liberalism
- Political position: Centre to centre-right

The Slovak Conservative Party (Slovak: Slovenská konzervatívna strana, abbreviated SKS), formerly known as Network (Slovak: Sieť, self-styled #SIEŤ), was a centre-right political party in Slovakia. It was established by Radoslav Procházka, a former member of Christian Democratic Movement (KDH).

== History ==
Original logo of the party.

The party was founded by Radoslav Procházka in June 2014, after the 2014 presidential election. Sieť polled above 10% being second to Smer and was expected to become the major centre-right party after 2016 parliamentary election.

The party received only 5.6% of votes and 10 seats in the actual election. The low support of Sieť was one of many surprises of the election. Sieť became part of governing coalition led by Smer which led to split in the party and another loss of support and departure of members including 3 MPs. Sieť fell to 1% in polls. Procházka was replaced by Roman Brecely in August 2016. 5 MPs led by Andrej Hrnčiar then left the party with intention to join Most-Híd. This left Sieť with only 2 MPs.

Prime Minister Robert Fico announced on 19 August that Sieť ministers will resign and Sieť will be integrated into one of other coalition parties. In January 2017, Sieť announced that it would be integrated into small Slovak party European Democratic Party. Integration was likely to happen in Spring 2017.

When Radoslav Procházka decided to give up on his seat, Sieť lost another MP. Procházka was replaced by Zuzana Simenová who decided to be independent. On 3 May 2017, Sieť lost its last MP.

Roman Brecely resigned as the party's leader on 10 May 2017. Marek Čepko became acting leader. On 10 September 2017, Ivan Zuzula was elected the new leader.

Sieť announced in June 2018 that it will change its name to Slovak Conservative Party. The name was changed on 4 July 2018.

In July 2021, SKS signed a memorandum with KDH which included that SKS will join KDH. At this point the party had several hundred members with 40 to 50 active ones. Their website has been offline since February 2022.

== Leaders ==
- Radoslav Procházka (2014–2016)
- Roman Brecely (2016–2017)
- Ivan Zuzula (since 2017)

== See also ==
- Politics of Slovakia
- List of political parties in Slovakia
- 2016 Slovak parliamentary election
