= 2016 Slovak parliamentary election =

- 5 March 2016

All 150 seats in the National Council 76 seats needed for a majority
- Opinion polls
- Turnout: 59.38% (▲0.48 pp)
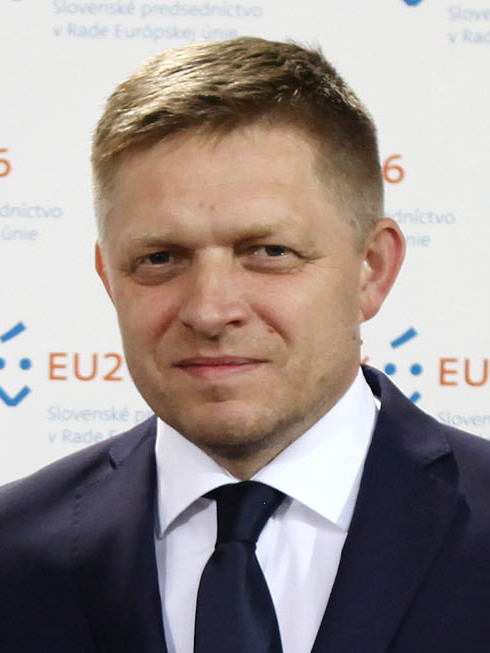

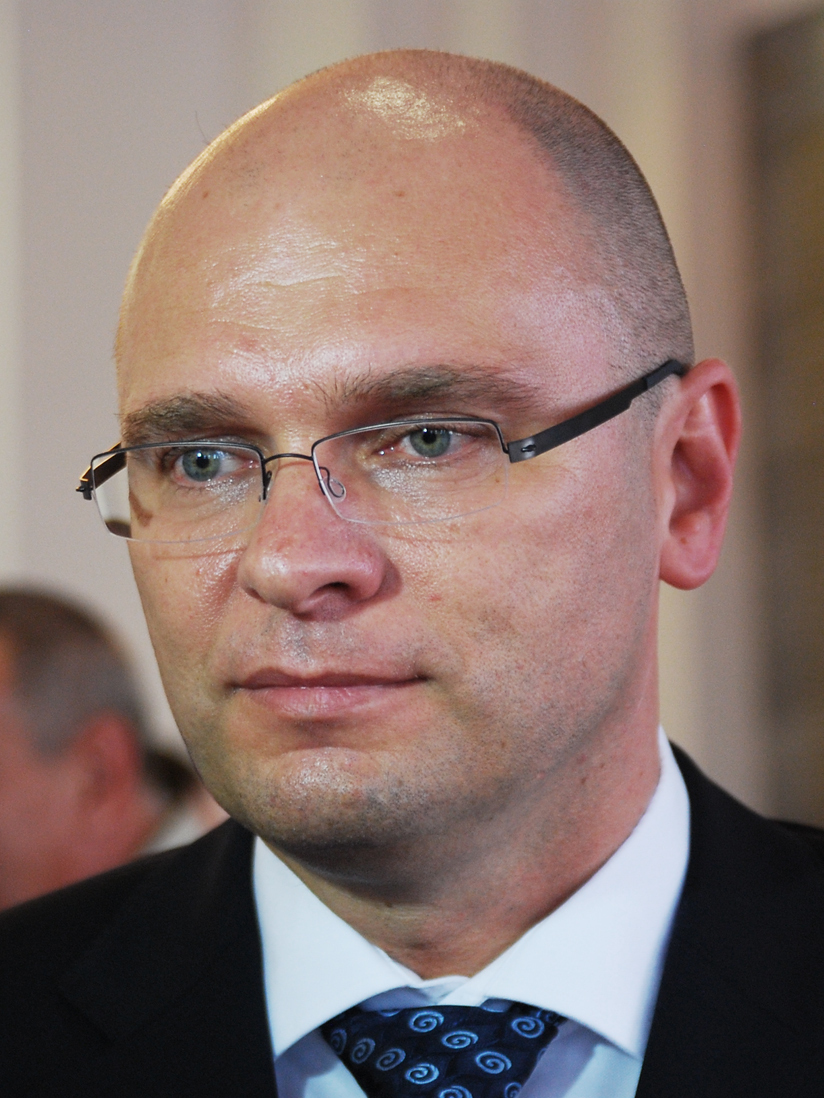

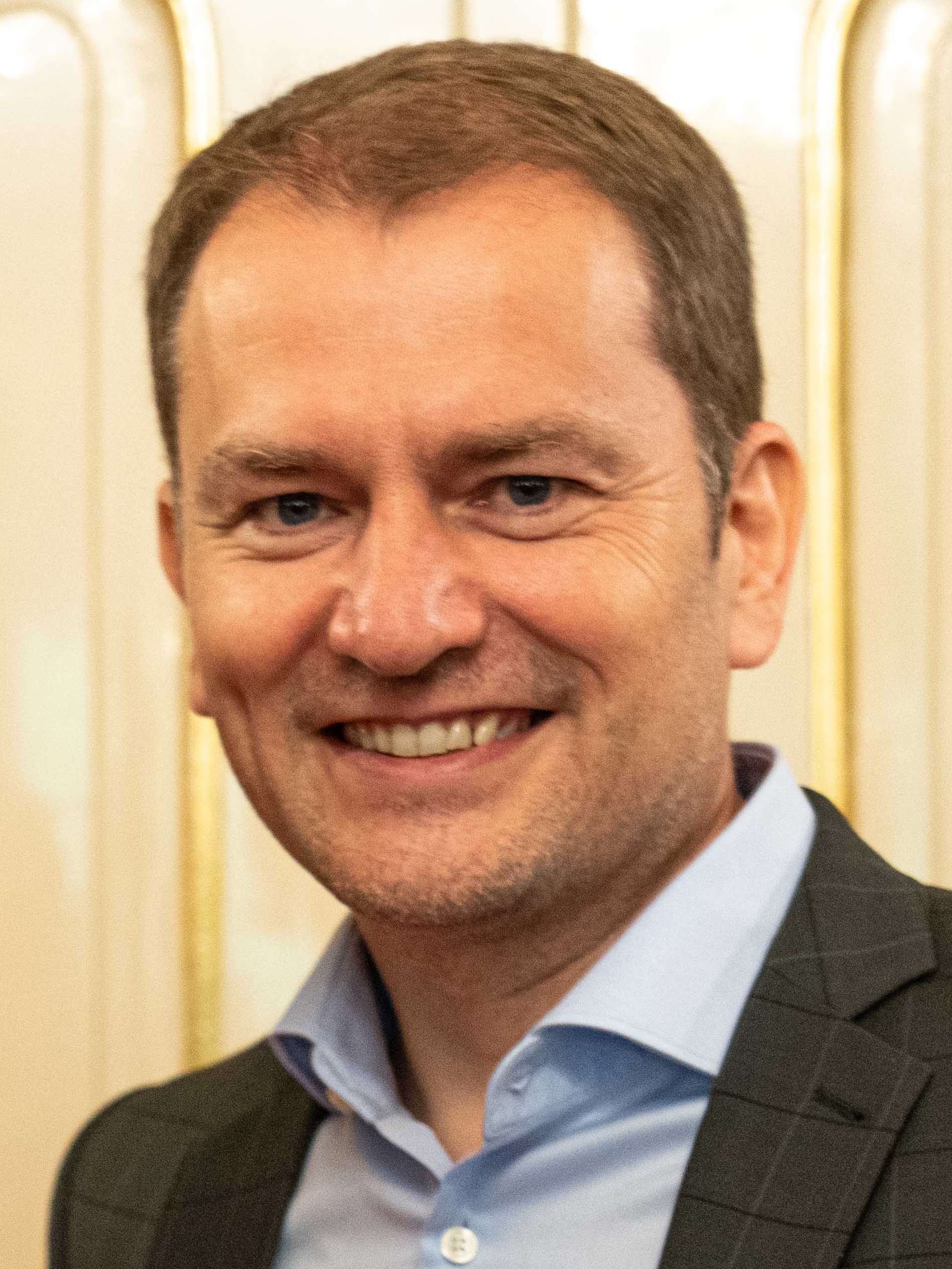

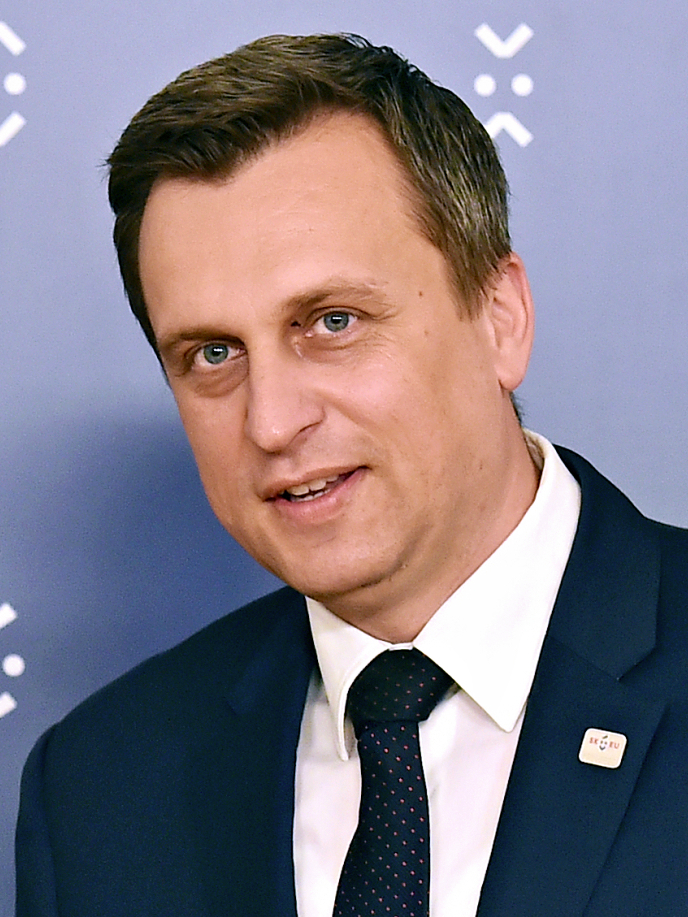

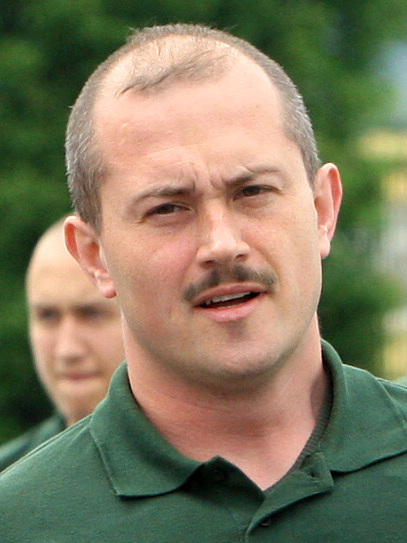

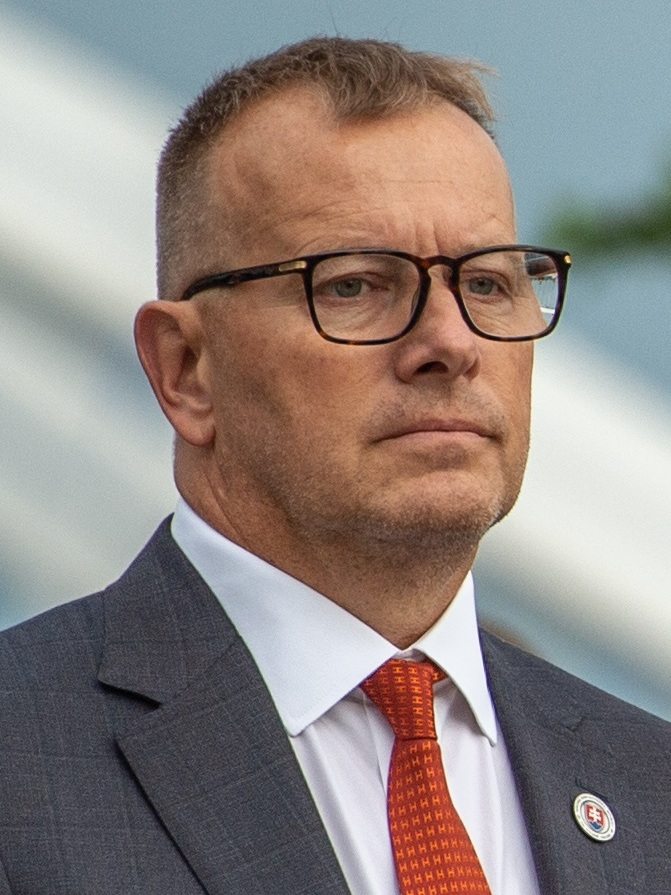

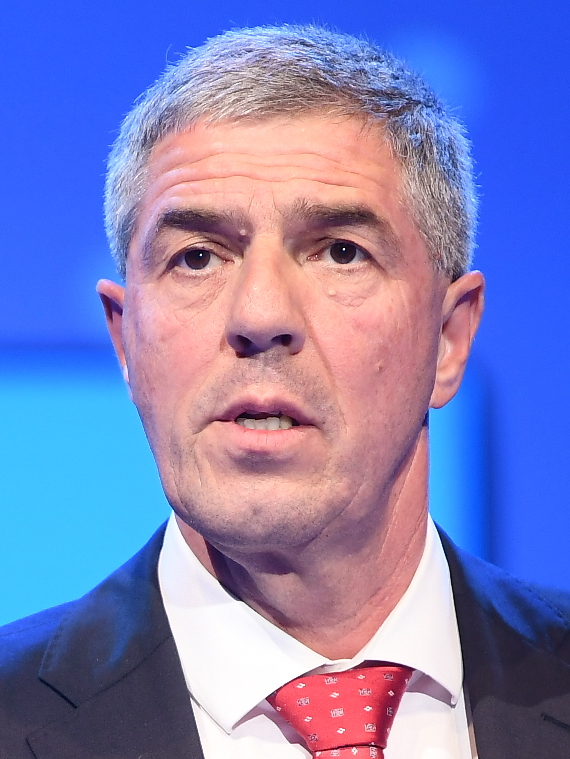

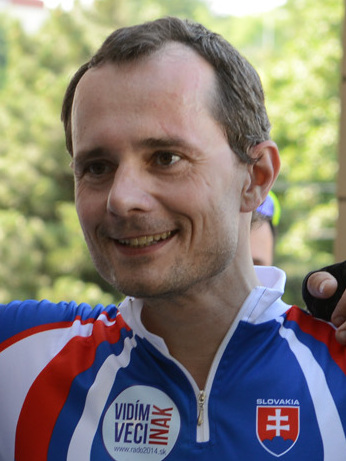
	First party	Second party	Third party
Leader	Robert Fico	Richard Sulík	Igor Matovič
Party	Smer	SaS	OĽaNO–NOVA
Last election	83 seats, 44.4%	11 seats, 5.9%	16 seats, 8.6%
Seats won	49	21	19
Seat change	▼34	▲10	▲3
Popular vote	737,481	315,558	287,611
Percentage	28.3%	12.1%	11.0%
Swing	▼16.1 pp	▲6.2 pp	▲2.4 pp
	Fourth party	Fifth party	Sixth party
Leader	Andrej Danko	Marian Kotleba	Boris Kollár
Party	SNS	ĽSNS	SR
Last election	0 seats, 4.6%	0 seats, 1.6%	Did not exist
Seats won	15	14	11
Seat change	▲15	▲14	New
Popular vote	225,386	209,779	172,860
Percentage	8.6%	8.0%	6.6%
Swing	▲4.0 pp	▲6.4 pp	New
	Seventh party	Eighth party
Leader	Béla Bugár	Radoslav Procházka
Party	Most–Híd	SIEŤ
Last election	13 seats, 6.9%	Did not exist
Seats won	11	10
Seat change	▼2	New
Popular vote	169,593	146,205
Percentage	6.5%	5.6%
Swing	▼0.4 pp	New
- Results by district
Prime Minister before election
Robert Fico
Smer
Elected Prime Minister
Robert Fico
Smer

Parliamentary elections were held in Slovakia on 5 March 2016 to elect the 150 members of the National Council. The ruling left-wing populist Direction – Social Democracy (Smer) party remained the strongest party, but lost its majority. The Slovak Democratic and Christian Union – Democratic Party (SDKÚ–DS), which led the government between 2000–06 and 2010–12, was defeated heavily, failing to cross the electoral threshold and losing its representation in the National Council. The centre-right Christian Democratic Movement (KDH) also failed to cross the threshold for the first time since 1990, whilst the far-right nationalist Kotleba – People's Party Our Slovakia (ĽSNS) entered parliament for the first time.

== Electoral system ==
The 150 members of the National Council were elected by proportional representation in a single nationwide constituency with an electoral threshold of 5% for single parties, 7% for coalitions grouping at least two parties. The elections used the open list system, with seats allocated using the Hagenbach-Bischoff system. Voters were able to cast up to four preferential votes for candidates on the list of the party they voted for.

All participating parties had to register 90 days before election day and pay a deposit of €17,000, which was refunded to all parties gaining 2% or more of the vote. All Slovak citizens were allowed to vote except for convicted felons in prison (only those who were convicted for serious offences), people declared ineligible to perform legal acts (legally insane) by court and citizens under 18 years of age. All citizens, who are 21 years of age or older and are permanent residents of Slovakia, were allowed to run as candidates except for prisoners, convicted felons and those declared ineligible to perform legal acts (legally insane) by court.

Voters not present in their electoral district at the time of the elections were allowed to request a voting certificate (voličský preukaz), which allowed them to vote in any district regardless of their residency. Voters not in Slovakia on election day were allowed to request a postal vote. According to the Central Election Committee, approx. 20,000 Slovak citizens abroad have requested a postal vote - the deadline for requests passed on 15 January 2016.

== Participating parties ==
Party	Ideology	Political position	Leader
Direction – Social Democracy (Smer)	Social democracy Left-wing populism	Centre-left	Robert Fico
Freedom and Solidarity (SaS)	Liberalism; Right-libertarianism	Centre-right	Richard Sulík
Ordinary People and Independent Personalities (OĽaNO)	Populism; Anti-corruption	Centre	Igor Matovič
Slovak National Party (SNS)	Slovak nationalism Right-wing populism	Far-right	Andrej Danko
Kotleba – People's Party Our Slovakia (KĽSNS)	Neo-Nazism; Ultranationalism	Far-right	Marian Kotleba
We Are Family (SR)	National conservatism Right-wing populism	Right-wing	Boris Kollár
Bridge (Most–Híd)	Hungarian minority interests Christian democracy	Centre-right	Béla Bugár
Network (SIEŤ)	Liberal conservatism Social conservatism	Centre-right	Radoslav Procházka

== Campaign ==
The election date was announced on 12 November 2015. On 7 December 2015, the Ministry of Interior published a list of 23 parties that registered to take part in the elections.

The backdrop of the campaign was centered on the European migrant crisis, with the governing SMER–SD taking an anti-migrant stance into the election. Teacher and nursing strikes occurring at the start of the year also had a negative effect on public opinion.

== Opinion polls ==
Date	Polling firm	Sample size	Smer	SIEŤ	KDH	Most–Híd	OĽaNO	SNS	SMK–MKP	SaS	NOVA	SDKÚ–DS	Others	Lead
10 Feb-14 Feb	MVK	1,136	32.5%	14.5%	9.0%	7.0%	5.0%	10.5%	5.0%	4.0%	w.OĽaNO	1.0%	11.7%	18.0%
6 Feb-14 Feb	Polis	1,670	38.4%	10.4%	6.6%	9.2%	6.8%	9.1%	4.0%	5.2%	w.OĽaNO	1.3%	9.0%	28.0%
6 Feb-14 Feb	Focus	1,005	34.6%	14.0%	7.0%	8.2%	6.1%	8.7%	3.5%	5.5%	w.OĽaNO	1.0%	8.9%	20.6%
31 Jan-7 Feb	Focus	1,000	34.1%	13.7%	7.5%	8.0%	6.4%	8.1%	3.6%	5.1%	w.OĽaNO	1.7%	11.8%	20.4%
22-31 Jan	Focus	1,009	36.3%	13.0%	7.1%	7.7%	6.4%	7.3%	3.8%	5.5%	w.OĽaNO	1.7%	11.2%	23.3%
22-28 Jan	MVK	1,148	32.1%	14.6%	8.2%	6.0%	5.9%	10.1%	5.1%	3.4%	w.OĽaNO	1.6%	13.0%	17.5%
11-14 Jan	AKO	1,000	40.7%	8.1%	5.6%	7.9%	5.7%	7.4%	—N/a	6.2%	w.OĽaNO	—N/a	18.4%	33.9%
2016
10 Mar 2012	2012 elections	2,553,726	44.4%	Did not exist	8.8%	6.9%	8.6%	4.6%	4.3%	5.9%	Did not exist	6.1%	10.0%	35.6%

== Contesting parties ==
=== Parliamentary parties prior to the election (2012–2016) ===
Name		Leader	Ideology	Previous election		Status
Name		Leader	Ideology	Votes (%)	Seats	Status
Smer	Direction – Social Democracy	Robert Fico	Social democracy	44.42%	83 / 150	Government
KDH	Christian Democratic Movement	Ján Figeľ	Christian democracy	8.82%	16 / 150	Opposition
OĽaNO–NOVA	Ordinary People and Independent Personalities–NOVA	Igor Matovič	Populism	8.56%	16 / 150	Opposition
Bridge	Bridge	Béla Bugár	Liberal conservatism	6.90%	13 / 150	Opposition
SDKÚ–DS	Slovak Democratic and Christian Union – Democratic Party	Pavol Frešo	Liberal conservatism	6.10%	11 / 150	Opposition
SaS	Freedom and Solidarity	Richard Sulík	Conservative liberalism	5.88%	11 / 150	Opposition

=== Newly elected parliamentary parties (2016–2020) ===
Name		Leader	Ideology	Previous election		Status
Name		Leader	Ideology	Votes (%)	Seats	Status
SNS	Slovak National Party	Andrej Danko	National conservatism	4.56%	0 / 150	Extra-parliamentary
ĽSNS	Kotleba – People's Party Our Slovakia	Marian Kotleba	Neo-Nazism	1.58%	0 / 150	Extra-parliamentary
We Are Family	We Are Family – Boris Kollár	Boris Kollár	National conservatism	Did not exist		Extra-parliamentary
Network	Network	Radoslav Procházka	Liberal conservatism	Did not exist		Extra-parliamentary

== Results ==
Results of the election, showing vote strength for each party by district.

Eight parties passed the 5% threshold to win seats; Direction – Social Democracy (SMER–SD) lost 34 seats, losing its majority in the National Council, but remained the largest party with 49 seats. Freedom and Solidarity (SaS) became the second party with 21 seats and Ordinary People (OĽANO–NOVA) third with 19 seats. Both performed better than their predicted pre-election polls, by distancing themselves from the previous government.

The Christian Democratic Movement (KDH) performed poorly, losing all 16 of their seats. They just failed to cross the 5 percent threshold required for parliamentary representation, for the first time since the establishment of an independent Slovakia in 1993. The far-right nationalist Slovak National Party (SNS) and Kotleba – People's Party Our Slovakia (ĽSNS) parties entered parliament with 8.6 percent (15 seats) and 8.0 percent (14 seats) of the vote respectively. According to an exit poll, dissatisfaction with corruption and social issues led many to vote for ĽSNS.

Other parties who gained representation in parliament include Most–Híd, We Are Family, and Network (the latter two being new parties with their first ever representation in parliament). Overall voter turnout was 59.8 percent.

Twelve of the 150 MPs were elected due to preferential voting despite being initially placed further down their party list than the number of seats won by their party; 7 out of 19 for OĽANO–NOVA, one out of 14 for Kotleba, two out of 11 for SNS, one out of 11 for Most–Híd and one out of 10 for Network.

Party	Votes	%	+/–	Seats	+/–
Direction – Social Democracy	737,481	28.28	–16.13	49	–34
Freedom and Solidarity	315,558	12.10	+6.22	21	+10
OĽANO–NOVA	287,611	11.03	+2.48	19	+3
Slovak National Party	225,386	8.64	+4.09	15	+15
Kotleba – People's Party Our Slovakia	209,779	8.04	+6.46	14	+14
We Are Family	172,860	6.63	New	11	New
Most–Híd	169,593	6.50	–0.39	11	–2
Network	146,205	5.61	New	10	New
Christian Democratic Movement	128,908	4.94	–3.88	0	–16
Party of the Hungarian Community	105,495	4.05	–0.23	0	0
Slovak Civic Coalition	21,785	0.84	New	0	New
TIP Party	18,845	0.72	New	0	New
Slovak Green Party	17,541	0.67	New	0	New
Communist Party of Slovakia	16,278	0.62	–0.10	0	0
Slovak Democratic and Christian Union – Democratic Party	6,938	0.27	–5.82	0	–11
CHANCE	6,522	0.25	New	0	New
Party of Modern Slovakia	4,559	0.17	New	0	New
Direct Democracy Party	3,595	0.14	New	0	New
Courage – Great National and Pro-Russian Coalition	3,428	0.13	New	0	New
Resistance – Labor Party	3,182	0.12	New	0	New
Hungarian Christian Democratic Alliance	2,426	0.09	–0.07	0	0
Democratic Party - Ľudo Kaník	1,998	0.08	New	0	New
Coalition – Together for Slovakia	1,777	0.07	New	0	New
Total	2,607,750	100.00	–	150	0
Valid votes	2,607,750	99.21			
Invalid/blank votes	20,798	0.79			
Total votes	2,628,548	100.00			
Registered voters/turnout	4,426,760	59.38			
Source: Volby

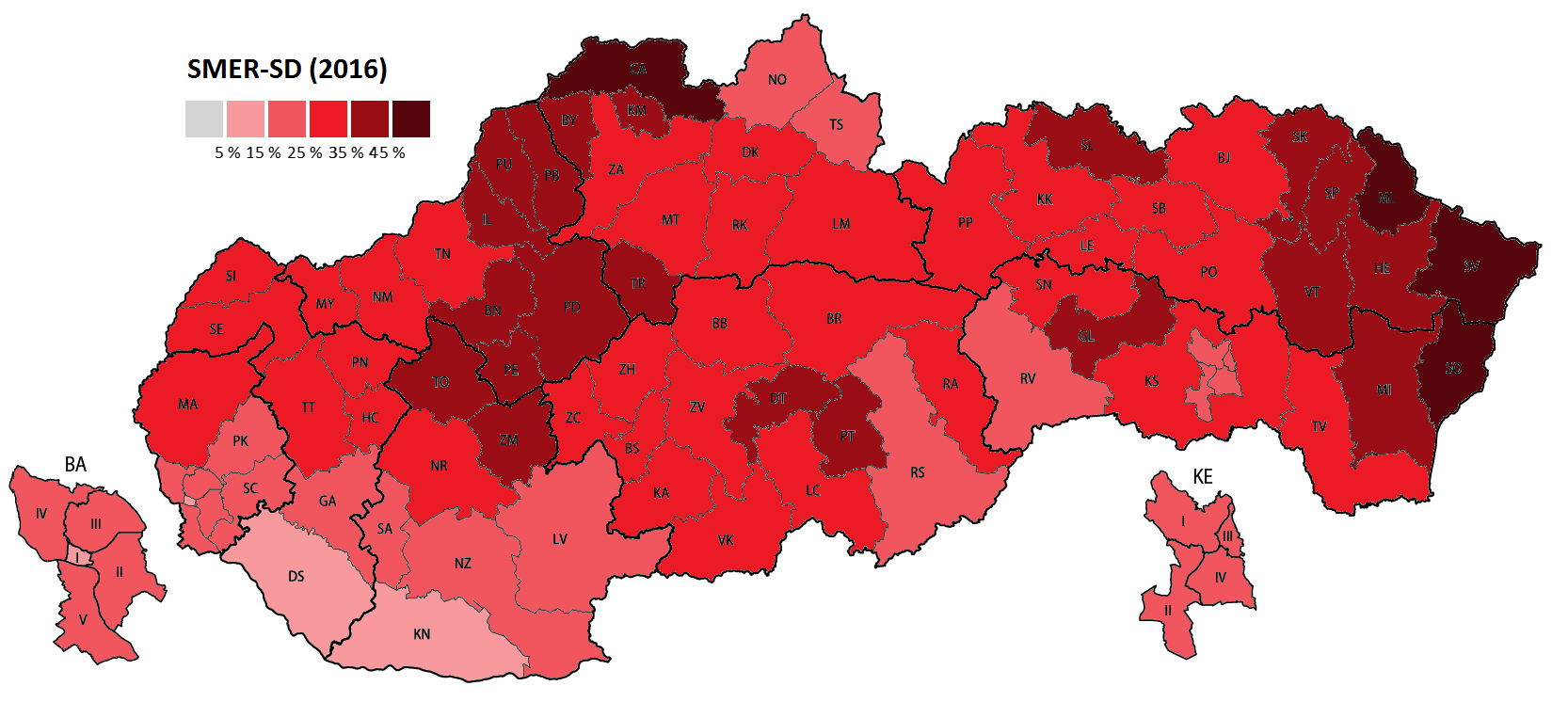
Smer

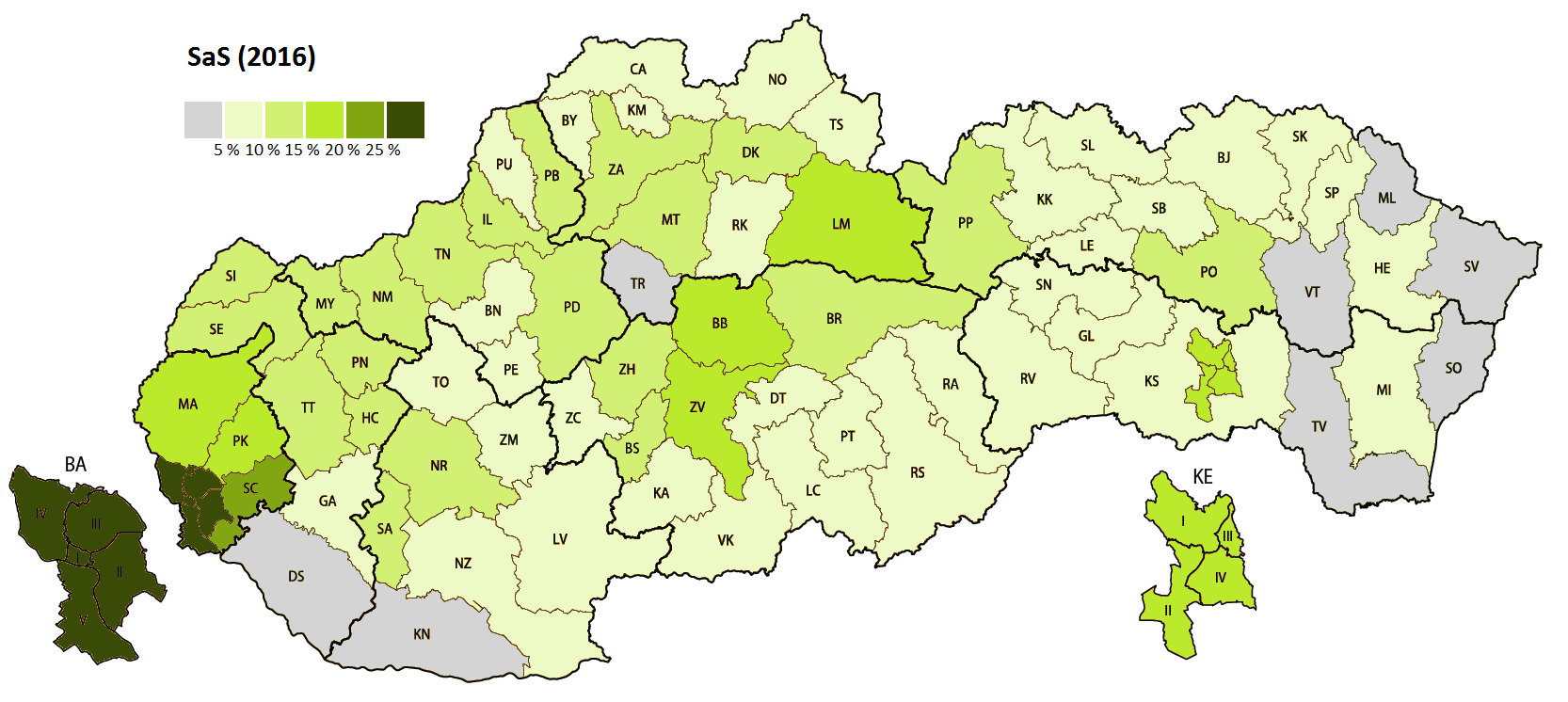
SaS

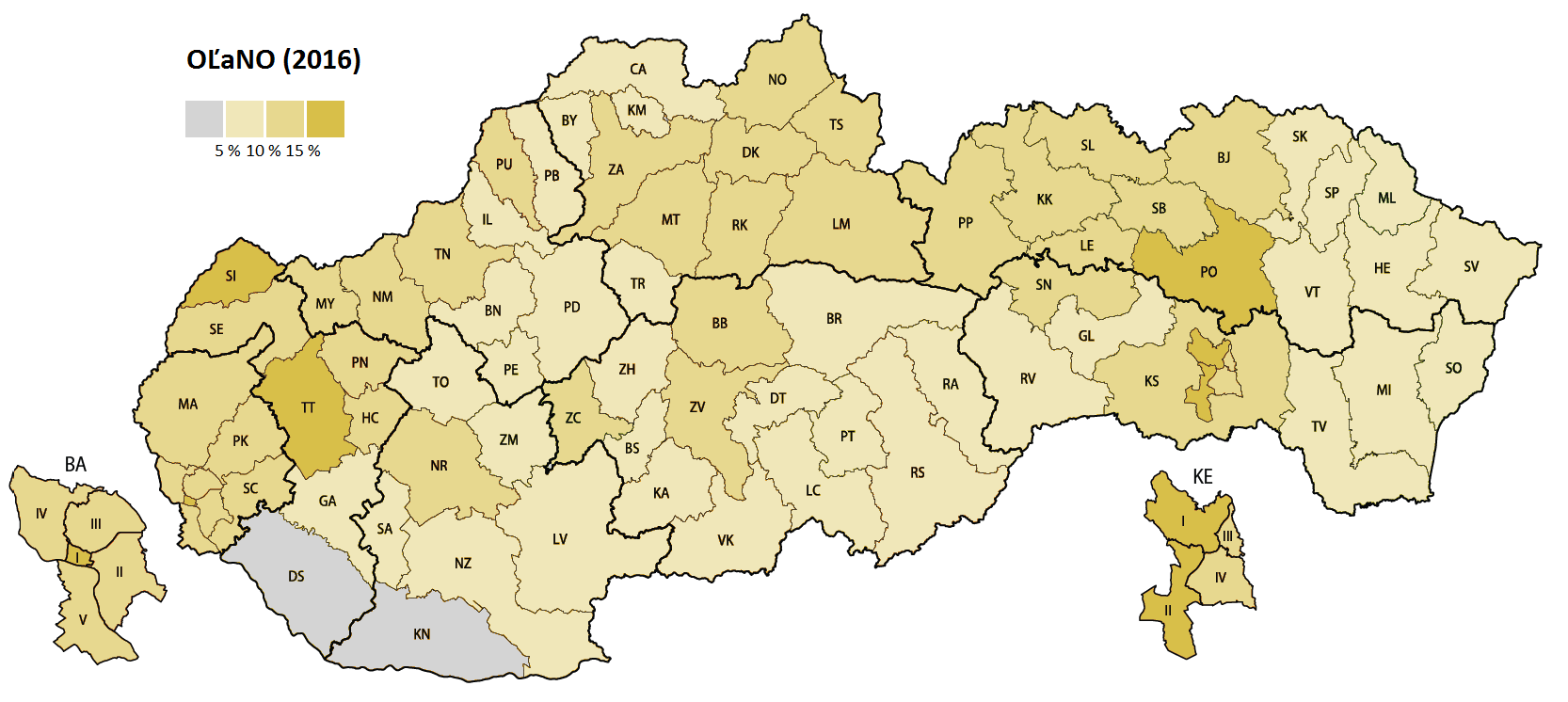
OĽANO

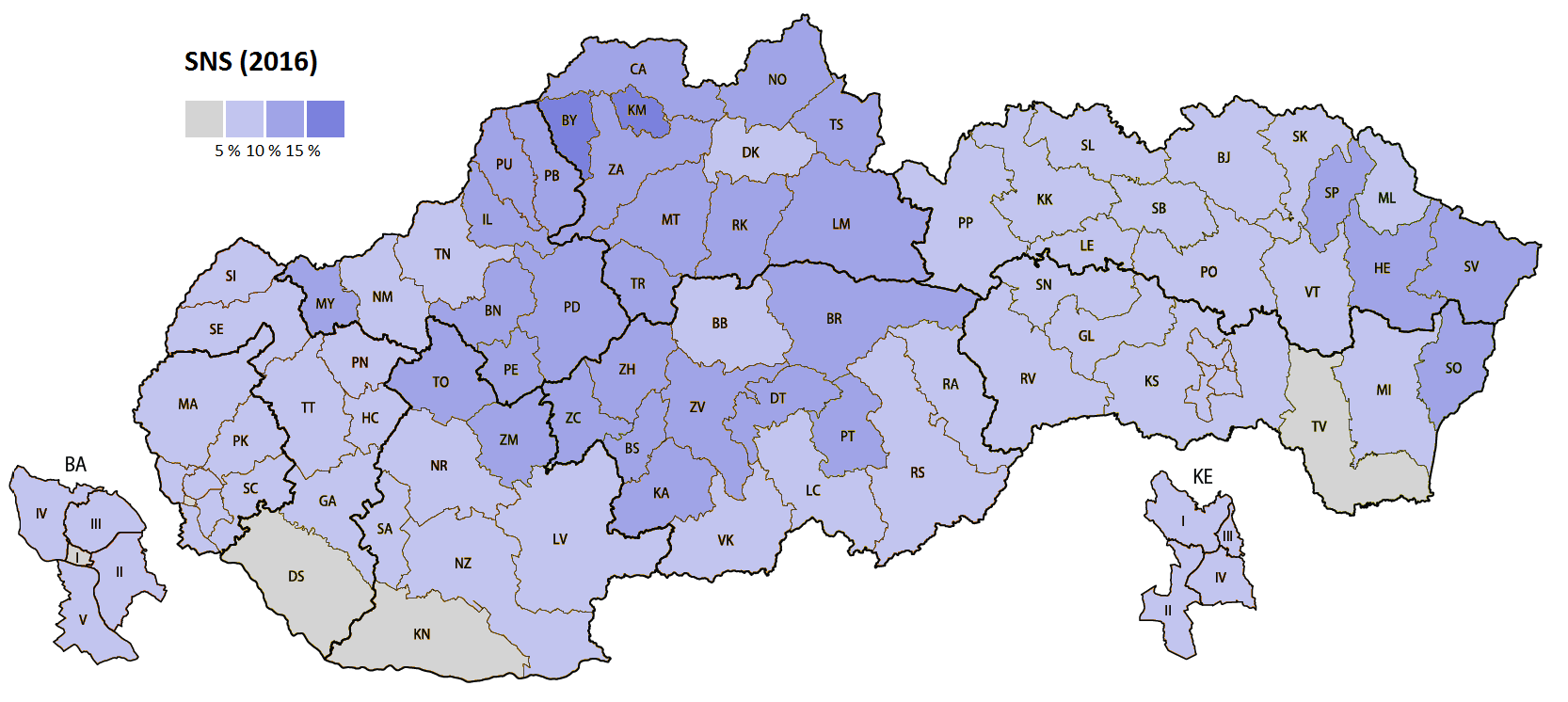
SNS

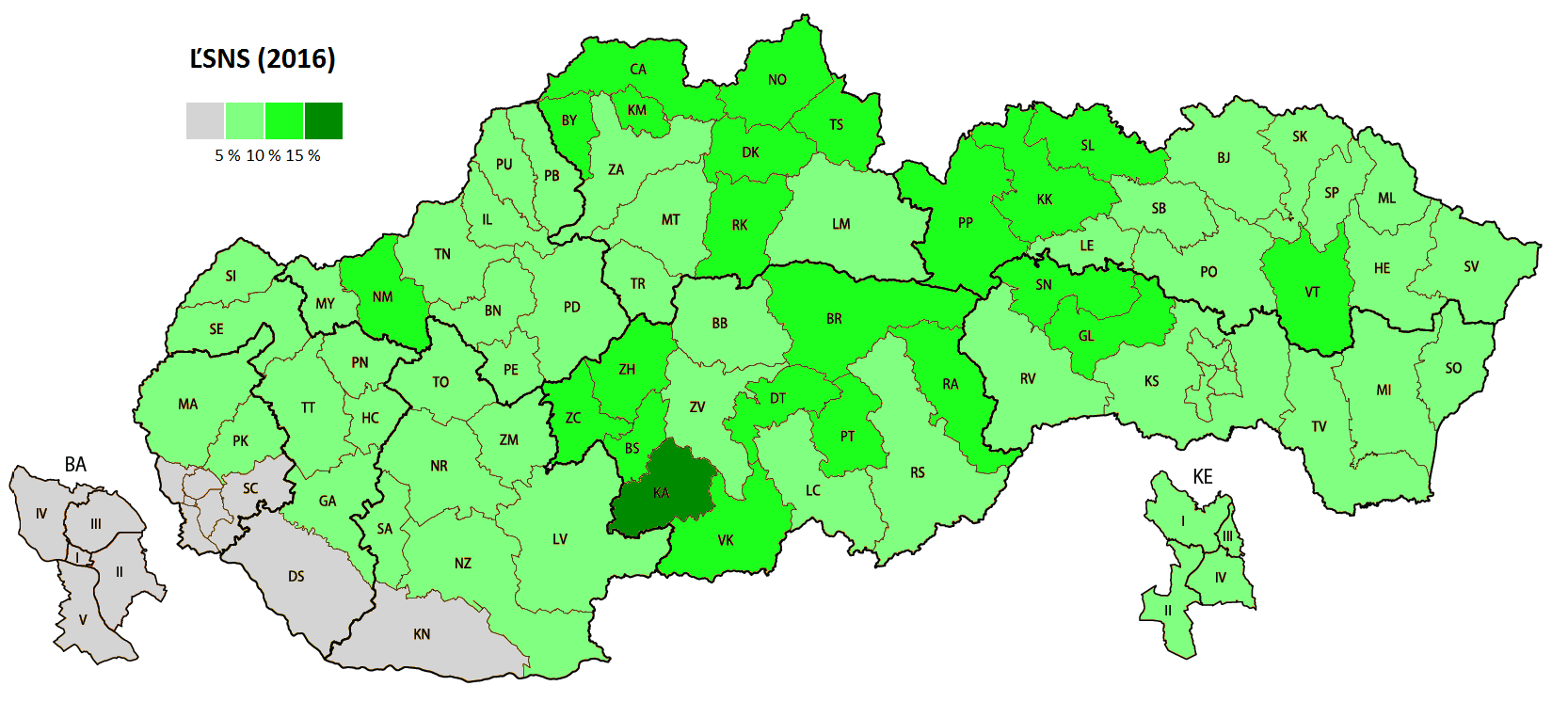
LSNS

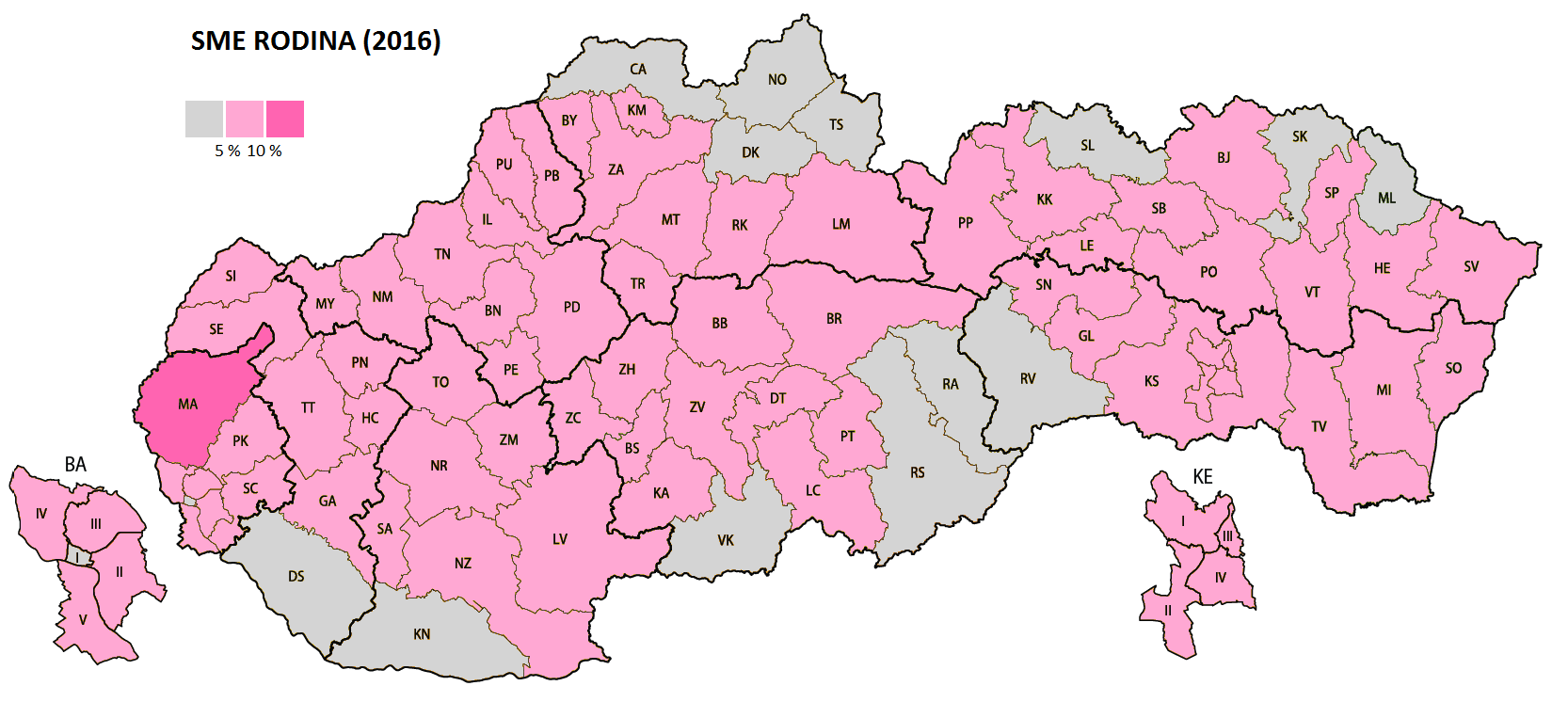
SR

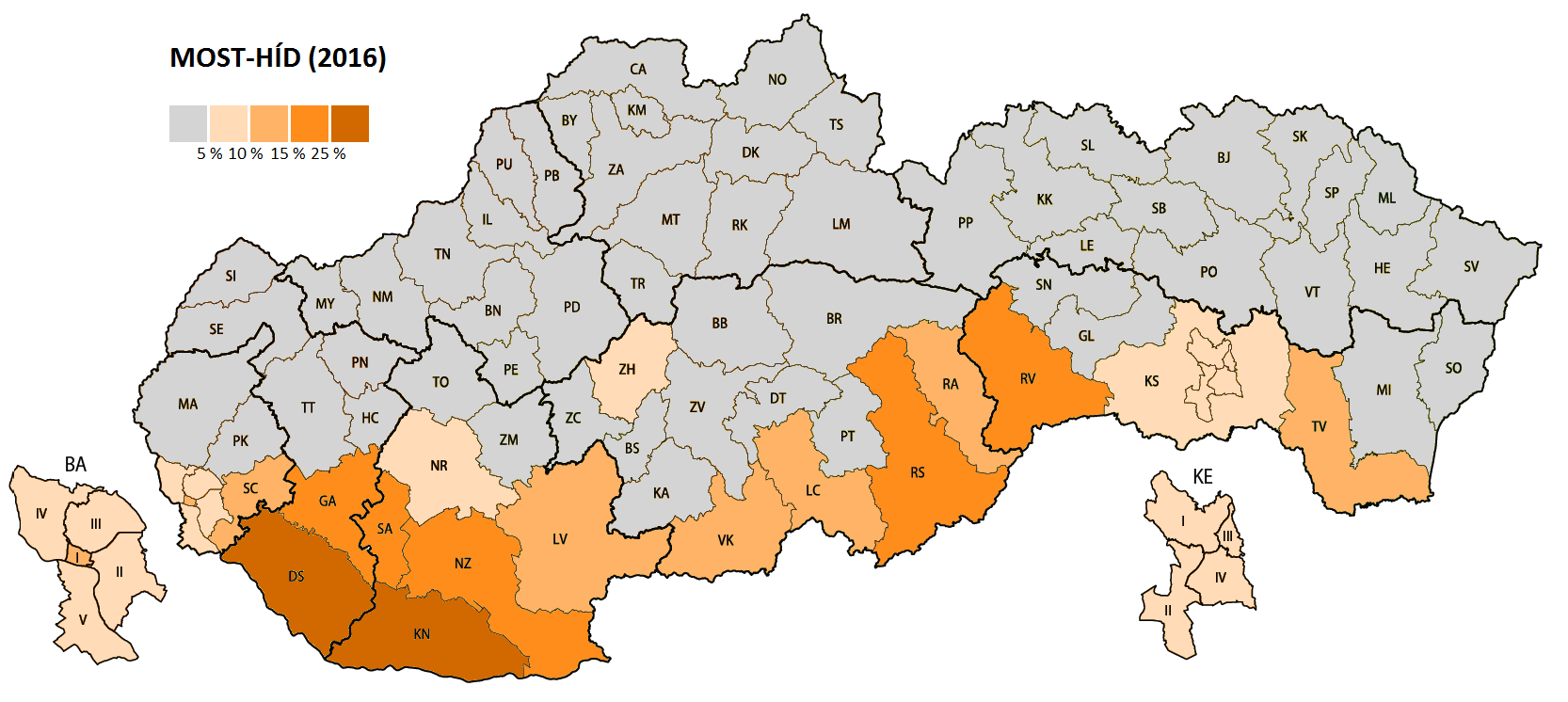
Most-Híd

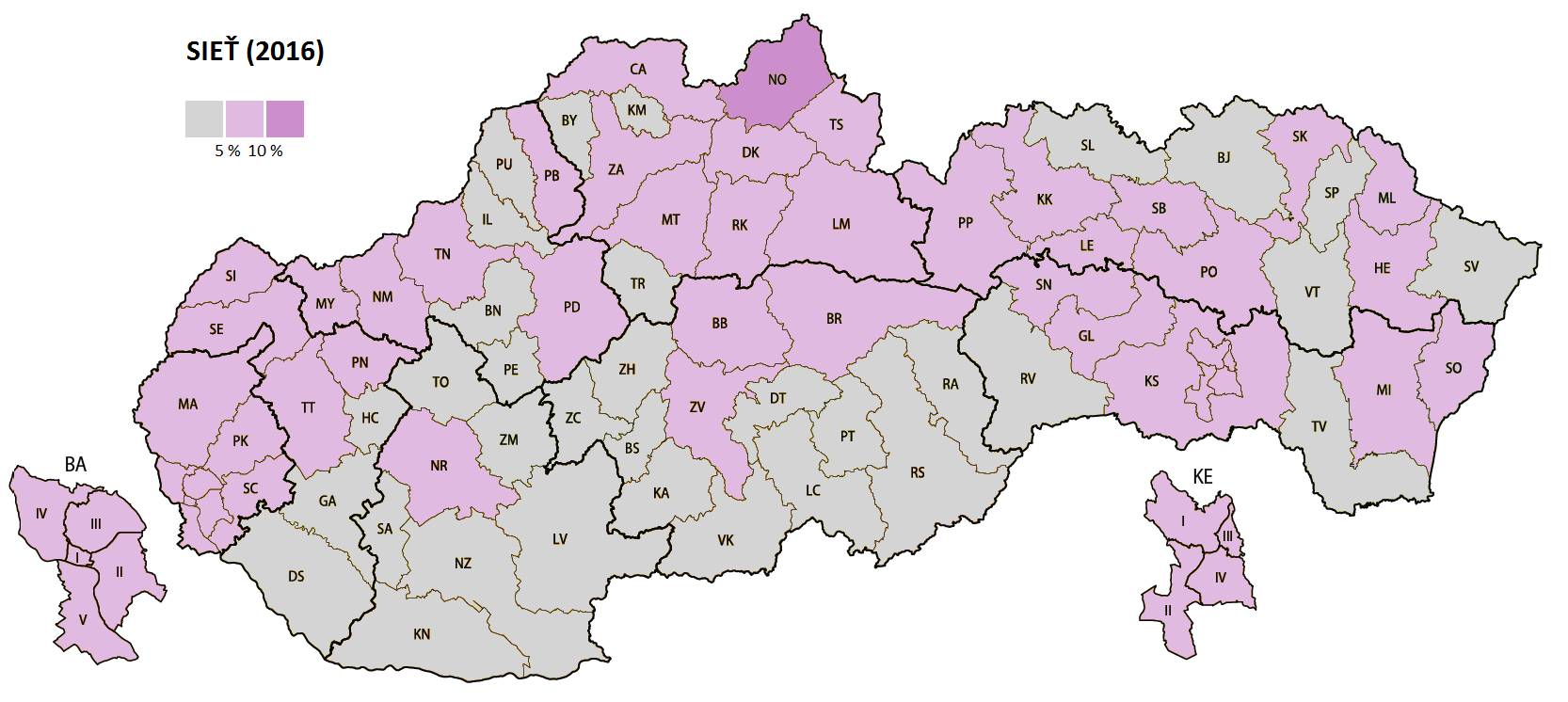
SIEŤ

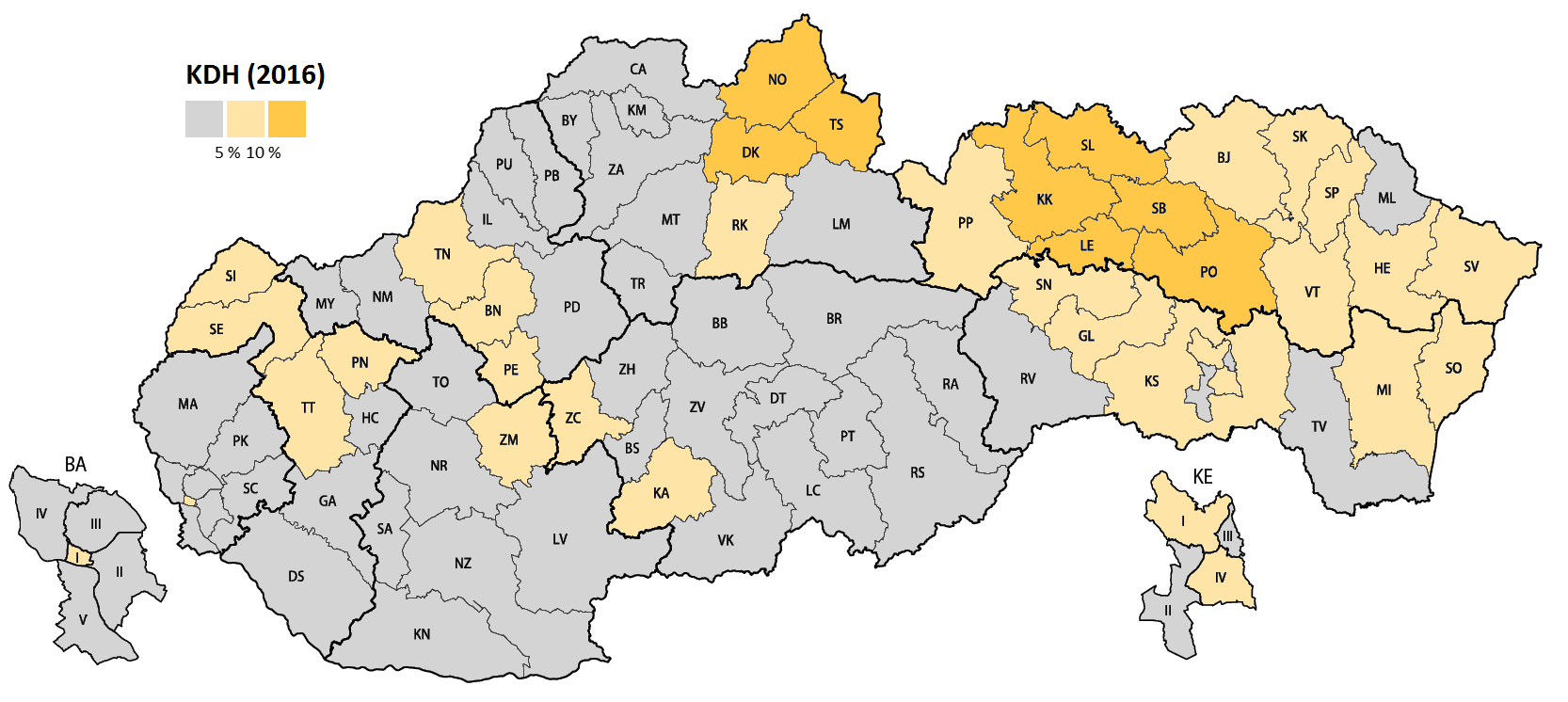
KDH

== Government formation ==
On 7 March, President of Slovakia Andrej Kiska invited each elected party, with the exception of ĽSNS, for post-election talks. Fico was given the first opportunity by the President to form a stable coalition. All parties, except We Are Family, had refused to discuss the possibility of going into government with ĽSNS. An anti-fascist protest was held the same day in Bratislava against ĽSNS representation in parliament.

On 17 March, incumbent Fico informed president Andrej Kiska that he would form a four-party government coalition, including Smer–SD, the Slovak National Party, Most–Híd and Network, which together held 85 of the 150 seats.
