= Government of Slovakia =

Executive authority in Slovakia

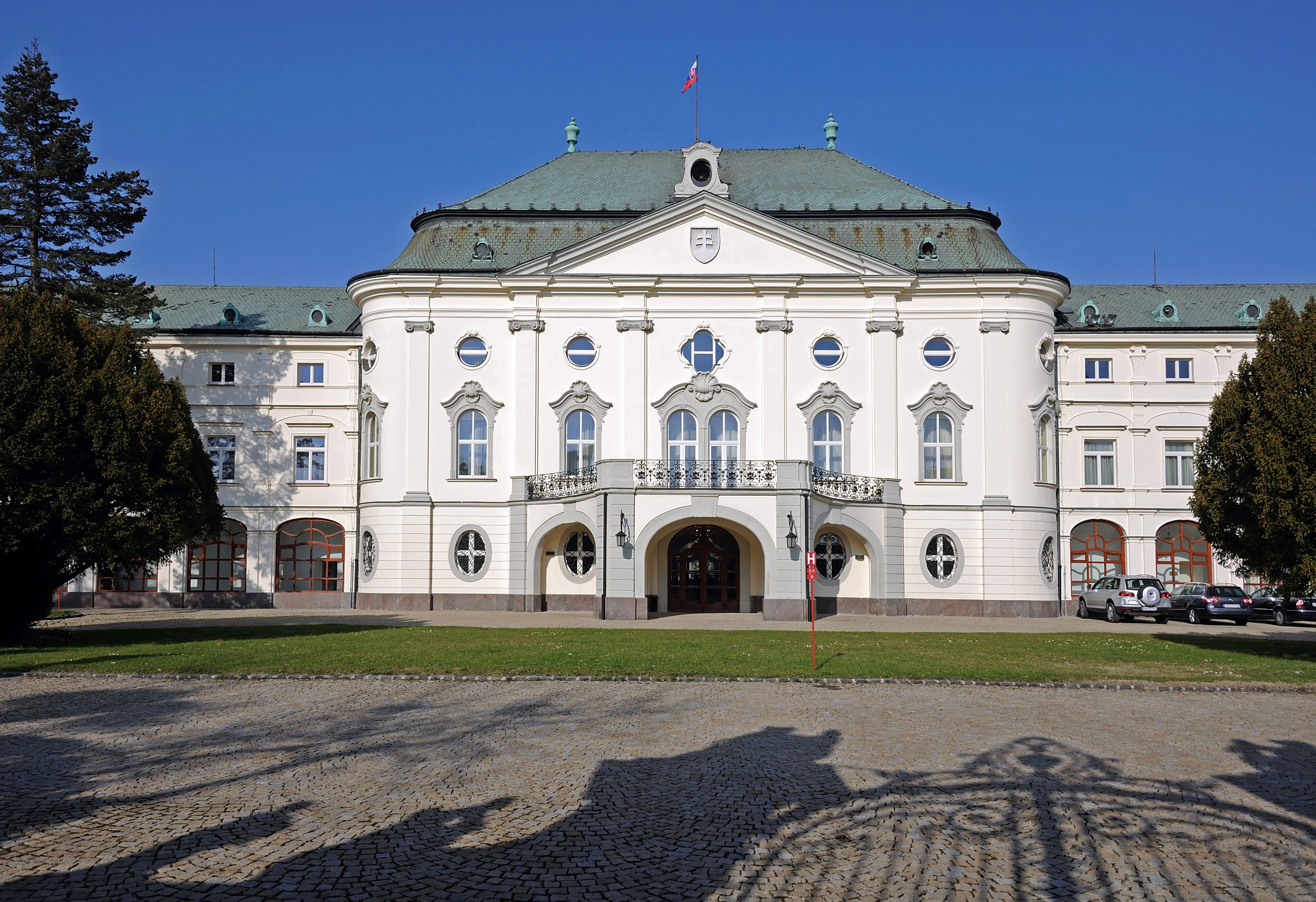
The Summer Archbishop's Palace is the seat of the Government.

The Government of the Slovak Republic (Slovak: vláda Slovenskej republiky) exercises executive authority in Slovakia. It is led by the Prime Minister of Slovakia, who is nominated by the President of Slovakia and is usually the leader of the majority party or a majority coalition after an election to the National Council of the Slovak Republic. The Cabinet appointed by the president on the prime minister's recommendation must gain a vote of confidence in the National Council.

== Role and powers of the Government ==
As the chief formulator of the nation's public policy under the Slovak Constitution, the Government has the authority to make major policies on the national economy and social security. It is responsible for meeting the Government program objectives within the scope of the adopted national budget. The main functions of the Government also include making proposals on the state budget, preparing the annual closing balance sheet, and issuing government regulations and decrees under the power given to it by law. One of the government's duties is formulating and managing the nation's foreign policy. It submits draft Bills to the National Council (the Slovak parliament), which are frequently preceded by nationwide discussions and consultations with the relevant organizations. As established by law, the Government can discuss in its proceedings a confidence vote motion, cases of pardoning criminal offenders, and appointment or removal from office of senior civil servants.

== Cabinet ==
The Cabinet is made up of the Prime Minister, who presides over Deputies and Government Ministers. The President of the Slovak Republic appoints the Cabinet on the Prime Minister's recommendation. The members of the Cabinet are responsible to the National Council (the Slovak parliament) for policy and administration.

== Composition ==
Portfolio	Minister	Took office	Left office	Party
Government's Office
Prime Minister	Robert Fico	25 October 2023	Incumbent	Direction – Social Democracy
Deputy Prime Minister
Deputy Prime Minister for European Union Subsidies and the Recovery Plan	Peter Kmec	25 October 2023	Incumbent	Voice – Social Democracy
Ministry of Defence
Deputy Prime Minister and Minister of Defence	Robert Kaliňák	25 October 2023	Incumbent	Direction – Social Democracy
Ministry of Economy
Deputy Prime Minister and Minister of Economy	Denisa Saková	25 October 2023	Incumbent	Voice – Social Democracy
Ministry of the Environment
Deputy Prime Minister and Minister of Environment	Tomáš Taraba (Note: Independent, ran on the party list of and nominated by Slovak National Party.)	25 October 2023	Incumbent	Slovak National Party
Ministry of Finance
Minister of Finance	Ladislav Kamenický	25 October 2023	Incumbent	Direction – Social Democracy
Ministry of Transport and Construction
Minister of Transport and Construction	Jozef Ráž (Note: Independent, nominated by Direction – Social Democracy.)	25 October 2023	Incumbent	Direction – Social Democracy
Ministry of Agriculture and Rural Development
Minister of Agriculture and Rural Development	Richard Takáč	25 October 2023	Incumbent	Direction – Social Democracy
Ministry of Investment, Regional Development and Informatics
Minister of Investment, Regional Development and Informatics	Richard Raši	25 October 2023	19 March 2025	Voice – Social Democracy
Minister of Investment, Regional Development and Informatics	Samuel Migaľ (Note: Independent, ran on the party list of Voice – Social Democracy and nominated by Direction – Social Democracy.)	19 March 2025	Incumbent	Independent
Ministry of Interior
Minister of Interior	Matúš Šutaj Eštok	25 October 2023	Incumbent	Voice – Social Democracy
Ministry of Justice
Minister of Justice	Boris Susko	25 October 2023	Incumbent	Direction – Social Democracy
Ministry of Foreign and European Affairs
Minister of Foreign and European Affairs	Juraj Blanár	25 October 2023	Incumbent	Direction – Social Democracy
Ministry of Labour, Social Affairs and Family
Minister of Labour, Social Affairs and Family	Erik Tomáš	25 October 2023	Incumbent	Voice – Social Democracy
Ministry of Education, Research, Development and Youth
Minister of Education, Research, Development and Youth	Tomáš Drucker	25 October 2023	Incumbent	Voice – Social Democracy
Ministry of Culture
Minister of Culture	Martina Šimkovičová (Note: Independent, ran on the party list of and nominated by Slovak National Party.)	25 October 2023	Incumbent	Slovak National Party
Ministry of Health
Minister of Health	Zuzana Dolinková	25 October 2023	10 October 2024	Voice – Social Democracy
Minister of Health	Kamil Šaško	10 October 2024	Incumbent	Voice – Social Democracy
Ministry of Tourism and Sport
Minister of Tourism and Sport	Dušan Keketi (Note: Independent, nominated by Slovak National Party.)	1 February 2024	5 March 2025	Slovak National Party
Minister of Tourism and Sport	Rudolf Huliak (Note: Independent, member of National Coalition / Independent Candidates, ran on the party list of Slovak National Party and nominated by Direction – Social Democracy.)	5 March 2025	Incumbent	National Coalition / Independent Candidates
