= Fico's Fourth Cabinet =

Government of Slovakia since 2023

Fourth Cabinet of Robert Fico
- Government of Slovakia

- Date formed: 25 October 2023

People and organisations
- President of Slovakia: Zuzana Čaputová until 15 June 2024 Peter Pellegrini since 15 June 2024
- Head of government: Robert Fico
- Head of government's history: 2006–2010; 2012–2018; 2023–present
- Deputy head of government: Peter Kmec until 19 November 2025; Tomáš Drucker since 19 November 2025; Robert Kaliňák; Denisa Saková; Tomáš Taraba until 30 September 2026; Martina Šimkovičová since 21 October 2026
- No. of ministers: 17
- Member parties: Direction – Social Democracy; Voice – Social Democracy; Slovak National Party; Rural Party (Note: Ran on the party list of Slovak National Party. Left the parliamentary group on 22 October 2024 and are sitting as independents in the National Council.) (2023–October 2024, February 2025–present); Slovak Patriot (Note: Ran on the party list of Slovak National Party.) (2023–2026); Life – National Party (Note: Ran on the party list of Slovak National Party.) (2023–2026)
- Status in legislature: Majority (coalition) (2023–January 2025, February 2025–November 2026); Minority (coalition) (January–February 2025, November 2026–present)
- Opposition parties: Progressive Slovakia; Christian Democratic Movement; Freedom and Solidarity; Slovakia (Note: Ran on the coalition list of OĽaNO and Friends.); Rural Party (Note: Ran on the party list of Slovak National Party. Left the parliamentary group on 22 October 2024 and are sitting as independents in the National Council.) (October 2024–February 2025); Christian Union (Note: Ran on the coalition list of OĽaNO and Friends.); For the People (Note: Ran on the coalition list of OĽaNO and Friends.); NOVA (Note: Ran on the coalition list of OĽaNO and Friends and the party list of Slovakia.); Civic Conservative Party (Note: Ran on the party list of Freedom and Solidarity.); Democrats (Note: Ľubomír Galko ran on the coalition list of OĽaNO and Friends and the party list of Slovakia. He left the parliamentary group on 5 September 2024 and is sitting as independent in the National Council.)
- Opposition leader: Michal Šimečka

History
- Election: 2023 Slovak parliamentary election
- Predecessor: Ódor's Cabinet

Fico's Fourth Cabinet is the incumbent government of Slovakia. It is a originally three-party coalition government composed of Direction – Social Democracy (Smer), Voice – Social Democracy (Hlas) and the Slovak National Party (SNS).

It was appointed on 25 October 2023 by President Zuzana Čaputová following the 2023 Slovak parliamentary election. The National Council passed a vote of confidence in the government on 21 November 2023.

== Composition ==
Portfolio	Minister	Took office	Left office	Party
Government's Office
Prime Minister	Robert Fico	25 October 2023	Incumbent	Direction – Social Democracy
Deputy Prime Minister
Deputy Prime Minister for European Union Subsidies and the Recovery Plan	Peter Kmec	25 October 2023	19 November 2025	Voice – Social Democracy
Deputy Prime Minister for European Union Subsidies and the Recovery Plan	Tomáš Drucker (Note: Acting minister.)	19 November 2025	Incumbent	Voice – Social Democracy
Ministry of Defence
Deputy Prime Minister and Minister of Defence	Robert Kaliňák	25 October 2023	Incumbent	Direction – Social Democracy
Ministry of Economy
Deputy Prime Minister and Minister of Economy	Denisa Saková	25 October 2023	Incumbent	Voice – Social Democracy
Ministry of Culture
Deputy Prime Minister (Note: Became Deputy Prime Minister on 21 October 2026.) and Minister of Culture	Martina Šimkovičová (Note: Independent, ran on the party list of and nominated by Slovak National Party.)	25 October 2023	Incumbent	Slovak National Party
Ministry of the Environment
Deputy Prime Minister and Minister of Environment	Tomáš Taraba (Note: Independent, ran on the party list of and nominated by Slovak National Party.)	25 October 2023	30 September 2026 (Note: The opposition dismissed Taraba by a parliamentary vote after the Slovak National Party voted with them when Fico refused to dismiss Taraba on the instruction of the party.)	Slovak National Party
Minister of Environment	Robert Fico (Note: Acting minister.)	30 September 2026	Incumbent	Direction – Social Democracy
Ministry of Finance
Minister of Finance	Ladislav Kamenický	25 October 2023	Incumbent	Direction – Social Democracy
Ministry of Transport and Construction
Minister of Transport and Construction	Jozef Ráž (Note: Independent, nominated by Direction – Social Democracy.)	25 October 2023	Incumbent	Direction – Social Democracy
Ministry of Agriculture and Rural Development
Minister of Agriculture and Rural Development	Richard Takáč	25 October 2023	Incumbent	Direction – Social Democracy
Ministry of Investment, Regional Development and Informatics
Minister of Investment, Regional Development and Informatics	Richard Raši	25 October 2023	19 March 2025	Voice – Social Democracy
Minister of Investment, Regional Development and Informatics	Samuel Migaľ (Note: Ran on the party list of Voice – Social Democracy, left the parliamentary group on 24 January 2025. Independent, nominated by Direction – Social Democracy as a result of a coalition crisis.)	19 March 2025	Incumbent	Independent (Note: De facto, the nomination of Direction – Social Democracy.)
Ministry of Interior
Minister of Interior	Matúš Šutaj Eštok	25 October 2023	Incumbent	Voice – Social Democracy
Ministry of Justice
Minister of Justice	Boris Susko	25 October 2023	Incumbent	Direction – Social Democracy
Ministry of Foreign and European Affairs
Minister of Foreign and European Affairs	Juraj Blanár	25 October 2023	Incumbent	Direction – Social Democracy
Ministry of Labour, Social Affairs and Family
Minister of Labour, Social Affairs and Family	Erik Tomáš	25 October 2023	Incumbent	Voice – Social Democracy
Ministry of Education, Research, Development and Youth
Minister of Education, Research, Development and Youth	Tomáš Drucker	25 October 2023	Incumbent	Voice – Social Democracy
Ministry of Health
Minister of Health	Zuzana Dolinková	25 October 2023	10 October 2024	Voice – Social Democracy
Minister of Health	Kamil Šaško	10 October 2024	Incumbent	Voice – Social Democracy
Ministry of Tourism and Sport
Minister of Tourism and Sport	Dušan Keketi (Note: Independent, nominated by Slovak National Party.)	1 February 2024	5 March 2025	Slovak National Party
Minister of Tourism and Sport	Rudolf Huliak (Note: Leader of Rural Party, ran on the party list of Slovak National Party, left the parliamentary group on 22 October 2024. Nominated by Direction – Social Democracy as a result of a coalition crisis.)	5 March 2025	Incumbent	Rural Party (Note: De facto, the nomination of Direction – Social Democracy.)

== Party composition ==
From its appointment on 25 October 2023 until October 2024, the government was formed by a three-party majority coalition holding 79 seats in the National Council (with the Slovak National Party parliamentary group also including MPs from National Coalition / Independent Candidates, Life – National Party, and Slovak Patriot). Initially composed of 16 ministries, the cabinet expanded to 17 ministries on 1 February 2024 following the establishment of the Ministry of Tourism and Sport, allocated to the Slovak National Party.

Party	Ideology	Leader	Deputies	Ministries
Direction – Social Democracy; SMER - sociálna demokracia	Social conservatism Left-wing nationalism Euroscepticism; Populism	Robert Fico	42 / 150	7 / 17
Voice – Social Democracy; HLAS - sociálna demokracia	Social democracy Social conservatism Populism	Matúš Šutaj Eštok	27 / 150	7 / 17
Slovak National Party; Slovenská národná strana	Ultranationalism; National conservatism Euroscepticism	Andrej Danko	10 / 150	3 / 17
Total			79 / 150	17

Following the departure of three MPs led by Rudolf Huliak from the Slovak National Party parliamentary group in October 2024 and the subsequent expulsion and departure of three rebellious MPs led by Samuel Migaľ from Voice – Social Democracy in January 2025, the coalition lost its parliamentary majority and operated as a minority government holding 73 seats prior to the March 2025 cabinet reshuffle.

Party	Ideology	Leader	Deputies	Ministries
Direction – Social Democracy; SMER - sociálna demokracia	Social conservatism Left-wing nationalism Euroscepticism; Populism	Robert Fico	42 / 150	7 / 17
Voice – Social Democracy; HLAS - sociálna demokracia	Social democracy Social conservatism Populism	Matúš Šutaj Eštok	24 / 150	7 / 17
Slovak National Party; Slovenská národná strana	Ultranationalism; National conservatism Euroscepticism	Andrej Danko	7 / 150	3 / 17
Total			73 / 150	17

Following amendments to the coalition agreement in March 2025, Direction – Social Democracy formally took over two ministries from its junior partners and nominated Rudolf Huliak (Rural Party) as Minister of Tourism and Sport and independent MP Samuel Migaľ as Minister of Investments. As substitutes replaced Huliak, Migaľ and Šalitroš in parliament, the coalition regained a 78-seat majority (with former Voice MP Ján Ferenčák ceasing to support the government).

Party	Ideology	Leader	Deputies	Ministries
Direction – Social Democracy; SMER - sociálna demokracia	Social conservatism Left-wing nationalism Euroscepticism; Populism	Robert Fico	42 / 150	7 / 17
Voice – Social Democracy; HLAS - sociálna demokracia	Social democracy Social conservatism Populism	Matúš Šutaj Eštok	25 / 150	6 / 17
Slovak National Party; Slovenská národná strana	Ultranationalism; National conservatism Euroscepticism	Andrej Danko	8 / 150	2 / 17
Rural Party; Strana vidieka Huliakovci	National conservatism Slovak nationalism Ultranationalism	Rudolf Huliak	3 / 150	1 / 17
Independents			0 / 150	1 / 17
Total			78 / 150	17

In autumn 2026, the coalition lost its majority once again and reverted to a minority government with 75 seats. Following the parliamentary dismissal of Environment Minister Tomáš Taraba on 30 September 2026 (whose portfolio was temporarily assumed by Prime Minister Robert Fico), Taraba returned to the National Council, reducing the Slovak National Party caucus to seven MPs, and was joined by MP Roman Malatinec from the Rural Party. Combined with the departure of MP Peter Slyško from Voice – Social Democracy, the government's parliamentary support dropped to 75 seats.

Party	Ideology	Leader	Deputies	Ministries
Direction – Social Democracy; SMER - sociálna demokracia	Social conservatism Left-wing nationalism Euroscepticism; Populism	Robert Fico	42 / 150	8 / 17
Voice – Social Democracy; HLAS - sociálna demokracia	Social democracy Social conservatism Populism	Matúš Šutaj Eštok	24 / 150	6 / 17
Slovak National Party; Slovenská národná strana	Ultranationalism; National conservatism Euroscepticism	Andrej Danko	7 / 150	1 / 17
Rural Party; Strana vidieka Huliakovci	National conservatism Slovak nationalism Ultranationalism	Rudolf Huliak	2 / 150	1 / 17
Independents			0 / 150	1 / 17
Total			75 / 150	17

== Issues ==
=== Domestic policy ===
==== Rule of law ====
In December 2023, the Fourth Cabinet of Robert Fico introduced an amendment to the Criminal Code. The government proposed that the bill be debated in a fast-track legislative procedure, arguing that the status quo leads to human rights violations. The amendment included scrapping the Special Prosecutor's Office dealing with high-level corruption and lowering penalties for financial crimes. The fast-track legislative procedure faced widespread criticism from the parliamentary opposition, President Zuzana Čaputová, the European Commission and non-governmental organizations, resulting in a weeks-long opposition parliamentary obstruction and a series of demonstrations.

Critics have raised questions about potential conflicts of interest within the government coalition. They have noted that various individuals with perceived affiliations to the government, alongside accused members of the coalition parties, including the bill's rapporteur, MP Tibor Gašpar of Smer, could be directly affected by the proposed lowering of penalties. Their cases are also overseen by the Special Prosecutor's Office, which the amendment would abolish. The coalition government introduced the amendment, citing the need to shift towards a rehabilitative approach to justice, update the criminal code, and align with European Union standards. Proponent of the law, the Ministry of Justice led by Boris Susko of Smer published the brochure "Overview of Violations of the Principles of the Rule of Law in the Years 2020–2023".

The amendment was finally approved by the National Council on 8 February 2024. The final proposal also included a reduction of the statute of limitations in rape cases from 20 to 10 years, which again caused widespread criticism from the parliamentary opposition, President Zuzana Čaputová and non-governmental organizations. The government defended the reduction of the limitation period by motivating victims to report rape earlier, possibly allowing a return to the 20-year limitation period in the next amendment after the approval of the law.

President Zuzana Čaputová signed the law on 16 February, verbally clearly expressing her opposition to its content. The President argued that by signing the law instead of vetoing it, she wants to create enough time for the Constitutional Court to decide on her submission challenging the constitutionality of the law. As of February 2024, the Constitutional Court is expected to make its decision following the publication of the law in the collection of laws by the Ministry of Justice. In July 2024, Constitutional Court annulled only minor changes in the law.

This reform stopped the prosecution of some corruption cases involving politicians and businessmen, some of whom were close to Fico. Among them were: former minister of finance Ján Počiatek. Oligarch Jozef Výboh, suspected of taking a bribe of €150,000, intended for Peter Pellegrini. And acting Speaker of the National Council Peter Žiga, suspected of an attempt to bribe a Supreme Court judge with €100,000 .

==== Doctors' Strike ====
In 2024, the government faced a doctors' strike for better conditions. More than 3,300 doctors submitted their resignations. The government passed a bill according to which, when an emergency situation is declared, doctors can face up to one year in prison or €1,500 fine for refusing to work, and up to five years if a patient is harmed as a consequence of their departure. Minister of Health Kamil Šaško considered using emergency situation in districts with the highest resignation rates. Ultimately the government signed an agreement with doctors' union with many concessions.

==== NGOs ====
Fico and some of his coalition members have shown their dislike for non-governmental organisations (NGOs) and civil rights groups. On 30 April 2024, Slovakia's parliament approved in the first reading legislative amendment introduced by the Slovak National Party. The bill would require NGOs which annually receive more than €5,000 from outside of Slovakia to register as "foreign agents", raising fears of the label being used for organisations disliked by the current government.

==== Media ====
Fico and his political associates have stopped responding to and inviting to their press conferences reporters from some major news outlets that criticise the government, such as Denník N, Aktuality.sk, and Sme, along with broadcaster TV Markíza, calling them "enemy media", while giving preferential treatment to media more favourable to him. Pavol Szalai, the head of the EU and Balkans desk of Reporters Without Borders, stated that Fico was subjecting Slovakia's democracy to a "crash test".

Reporters Without Borders (RSF) stated: “RSF condemns the ruling parties’ verbal attacks, their attempts to restrict access to information and their questioning of the independence of the public broadcaster RTVS.”

The government has proposed a drastic cut in the financing of the RTVS, as well as a plan to split it into separate radio and television companies, attracting criticism from Reporters Without Borders and other organisations.

RSF, International Press Institute, European Federation of Journalists, Free Press Unlimited and European Centre for Press and Media Freedom have voiced their concerns in an open letter to the President and the National Council. They have stated that these government actions can weaken the independence of this media and endanger the freedom of the press in Slovakia.

In April 2024, the Government of Slovakia approved the Television and Radio Act proposed by prime minister Robert Fico and minister of culture Martina Šimkovičová over alleged partiality of the broadcaster. If the bill is supported by the Parliament of Slovakia, Radio and Television of Slovakia RTVS will be closed by the following June and replaced by a new broadcaster, named STVR.

The new broadcaster STVR was required by law to broadcast the Slovak national anthem once a day, a move seen as a nationalist gesture.

In June 2024, the Parliament of Slovakia voted in favor of the media laws. The Radio and Television of Slovakia (RTVS) was dissolved and replaced by a new media Slovak Television and Radio (STVR).

==== Constitutional amendments ====
On 27 January 2025, Prime Minister Fico announced plans for constitutional amendments to the Constitution of Slovakia. One would place the constitution higher than international treaties and agreements, another would formally recognize only two genders (Male and female), restrict "gender transition" and prohibit the adoption of children by same-sex couples.

On 9 April 2025, The Parliament of Slovakia passed the government's constitutional amendment into the second reading. Of the 143 deputies who voted, 81 supported it (Smer-Hlas-SNS), 40 were against and 22 abstained. In addition to the government deputies, the proposal was also supported by opposition deputies Christian Union.

In June 2025, The vote on the constitutional amendment was delayed until September.

On 26 September 2025, The Parliament of Slovakia passed the government's constitutional amendment. 90 supported it (Smer-Hlas-SNS), 7 were against. In addition to the government deputies, the proposal was also supported by opposition deputies 9 (out of 11) Christian Democratic Movement, 1 Christian Union, 3 (out of 10) Slovakia.

Constitutional Amendment of two genders, sovereignty, surrogacy ban, adoption of children Robert Fico (SMER-SD)
Ballot →	26 September 2025
Required majority →	90 out of 99 (qualified)
Yes: • SMER-SD (41); • HLAS-SD (25); • Slovensko (3); • KDH (9); • SNS (8); • Independents (4)	90 / 150
No: • SaS (7)	7 / 150
Absentions: • KDH (2)	2 / 150
Absentees: • PS (33); • HLAS-SD (1); • Slovensko (11); • SaS (5); • Independents (1)	53 / 150

=== Foreign policy ===
==== Ukraine ====
Fico is widely seen as pro-Russian, and his government has stopped militarily supporting Ukraine, saying he "will not send one bullet" to Ukraine. Fico has been opposing sanctions against Russia, with his standpoint on Ukraine being compared to that of Viktor Orbán. In an RTVS interview, Fico questioned Ukraine's sovereignty and independence, claiming that Ukraine is just a US puppet, sparking outrage in both Slovakia and Ukraine. He has also stated that Slovakia will veto Ukraine's NATO membership, and has pushed for a peace deal, even if Ukraine suffers territorial losses. His words regarding Ukraine have been described as "heartless", "vulgar" and "disgraceful".

Upon taking office, Fico officially ended Slovakia's arms supplies to Ukraine. However, he has since taken a somewhat different line on Ukraine in office than during his election campaign. During a meeting with Ukrainian Prime Minister Denys Shmyhal in January 2024, Fico promised not to block private Slovak arms companies from selling to Ukraine, not to block EU financial support for Ukraine, and to support the accession of Ukraine to the European Union. He described Slovakia's political differences with Ukraine as "minor" and claimed to support Ukraine's sovereignty and territorial integrity.

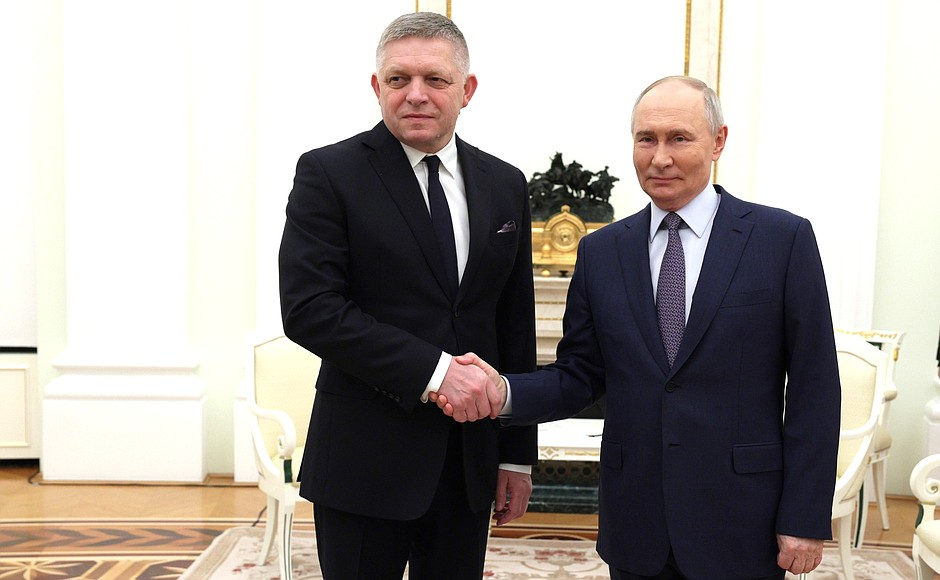
Fico meeting Russian president Vladimir Putin in Moscow, 22 December 2024

Fico met with Russian president Vladimir Putin in December 2024 in Moscow to discuss primarily the transfer of Russian gas to Slovakia. He became the third Western leader to do so since the war started.

In 2025 February, The Slovak National Party criticised Fico for his support for United Nations General Assembly Resolution ES-11/7, suggesting that Slovakia should have opposed the resolution in line with Hungary's position.

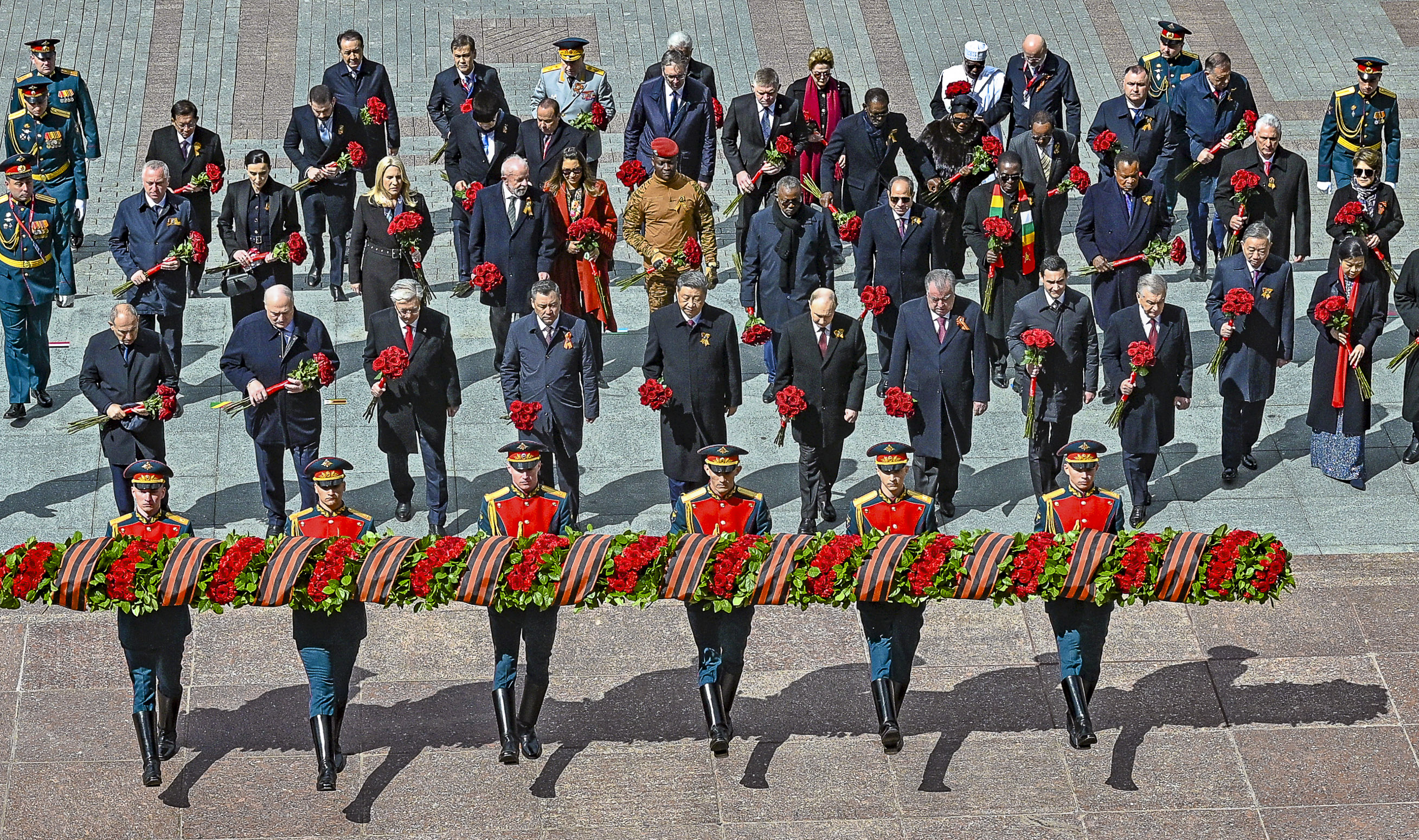
Fico (in the middle of the last row) was the only leader of an EU member state to attend the Russian Victory Day parade in Moscow, Russia, 9 May 2025

In May 2025, Fico was the only leader of an EU member state attended the Russian Victory Day parade.

==== China ====
In September 2025, Fico was the only leader of an EU member state to take part in the commemorative events marking the 80th anniversary of the Chinese people's victory in the War of Resistance against Japan and the end of World War II in Beijing.

== See also ==
- Hungary's Fifth Orbán Government
