= Miroslav Radačovský =

Slovak politician

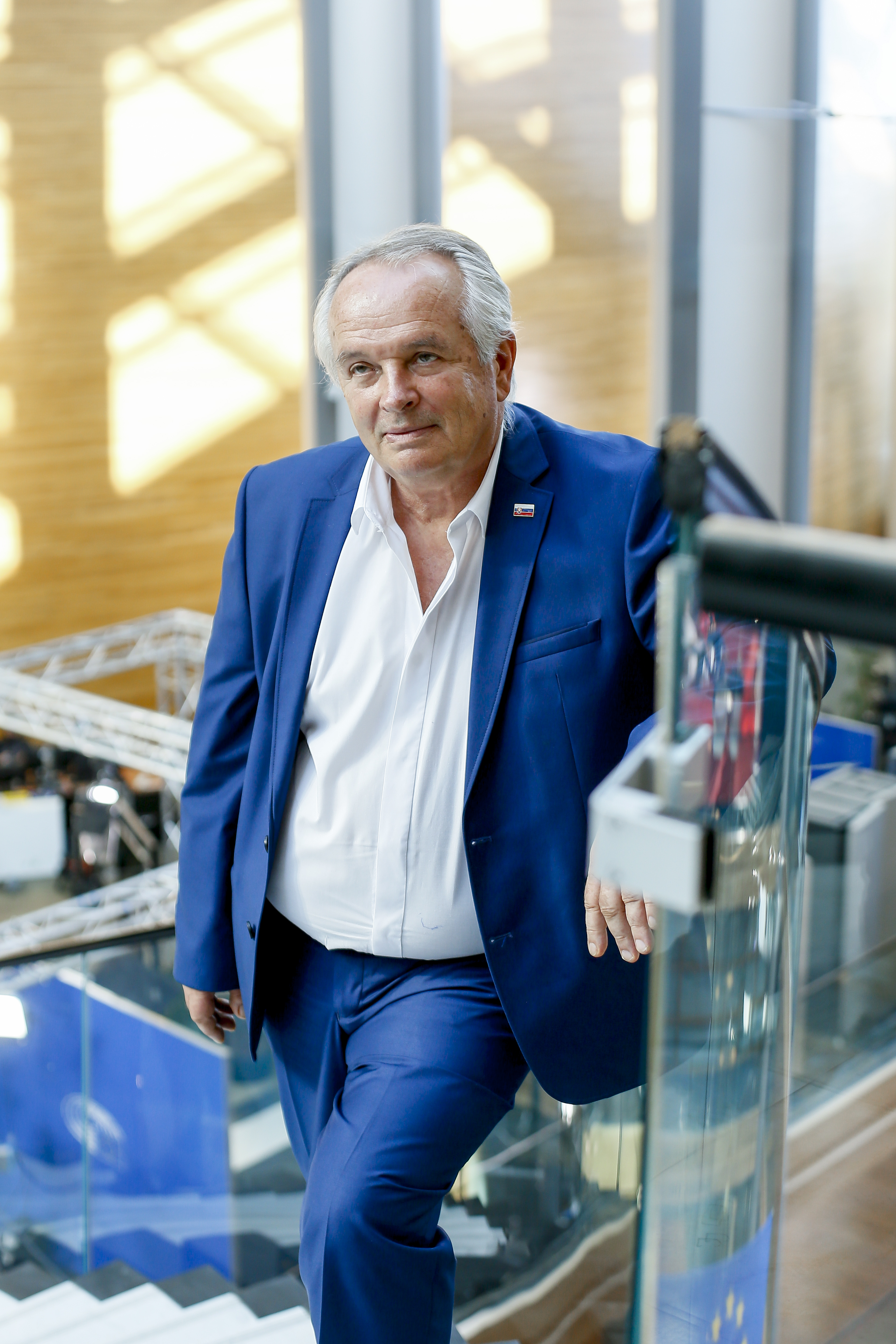
- Radačovský in 2024

Member of the European Parliament for Slovakia
- In office 2 July 2019 – 15 July 2024

Personal details
- Born: 24 September 1953 (age 72) Ľutina, Czechoslovakia
- Party: Slovak Patriot (2021–2026)
- Spouse: Mária Radačovská

Miroslav Radačovský (born 24 September 1953 in Ľutina) is a Slovak politician, diplomat and former judge, who was non-attached Member of the European Parliament from 2019 to 2024. From 2025 to 2026, he was a member of the National Council. Since June 2026, he has been acting as the ambassador of the Slovak Republic to Cyprus.

Miroslav Radačovský served in the judiciary for 37 years and 214 days. Up until his election to the European Parliament, he worked at the District Court in Poprad. As a judge, he led a land ownership case against former Slovak President Andrej Kiska, which Kiska lost.

In July 1999, Miroslav Radačovský came into the public eye when he was stopped by police officers in Košice during a routine traffic check. They found 18 packets of cocaine in his possession, as well as an illegally held rifle on the car seat. Radačovský defended himself by claiming he had found the items in his son’s apartment in Košice and, to prevent his son from facing legal trouble, had taken the items with the intention of disposing of them.

After twelve years of hearings and appeals, the Regional Court in Žilina delivered a clear verdict in 2012, declaring Judge Miroslav Radačovský innocent.

Miroslav Radačovský later retired from his position as judge and successfully ran for the European Parliament.

== Political career ==
=== Membership in the European Parliament ===
On 2 July 2019, Radačovský was elected as the Member of the European Parliament for Slovakia on the election list of the far-right People's Party Our Slovakia, later he became one of the non-attached members.

In April 2024, MEP Radačovský, after performing a speech wishing the whole world, the Russians and the Ukrainians peace, produced a live dove from a bag and released it into the chamber of the Parliament in Strasbourg. French ecologist MEP Caroline Roose raised a point of order against the act.

=== Slovak Patriot ===
On February 10, 2021, the political party Slovak Patriot was established following a signature collection campaign in Slovakia in 2020. During the 1st assembly of the party on February 20, 2021, Miroslav Radačovský was elected chairman. The party was dissolved in February 3, 2026.

=== Membership in the National Council ===
In the 2023 Slovak parliamentary election, he ran at the list of the Slovak National Party, which has signed an electoral coalition treaty with his party. However, he did not become an MP until March 25, 2025 as a substitute for Rudolf Huliak, who became a minister. He joined the National Council as an unaffiliated member, but declared his support for the government coalition led by Robert Fico.

=== Ambassador to Cyprus ===
In 2026, Radačovský was nominated by the coalition for the post of ambassador of the Slovak Republic to Cyprus. The nomination was approved by the Foreign Committee of the National Council of Slovakia, while the opposition in the committee was critical of it and voted against it. Despite initial hesitation and sharp criticism from the media and the opposition, President Peter Pellegrini appointed Radačovský as ambassador. The appointment was criticized mainly for his lack of diplomatic experience and his controversial past.
