= Dušan Keketi =

Dušan Keketi may refer to:

- Dušan Keketi (footballer)
- Dušan Keketi (politician)
