= 2022 Slovak regional elections =

The 2022 Slovak regional elections were held on 29 October 2022. For the first time, local elections took place simultaneously.

== Summary results ==
The Hungarian Alliance candidates received the most votes of any party in the country, more than half a million. The Alliance party also has the largest factions in the county councils of the Trnava and Nitra regions.

The following tables summarize the elected deputies by their party affiliation (also with coalitions).

Summary of the 29 October 2022 regional election results in Slovakia
Parties and coalitions	2022 Results
Parties and coalitions	Total number
Independent	159
Freedom and Solidarity	81
Alliance	70
Christian Democratic Movement	62
Voice	60
We Are Family	55
Direction	50
For the People	39
Progressive Slovakia	38
Together	36
Civic Conservative Party	35
Chance	31
Civic Democrats of Slovakia	31
Slovak National Party	30
Team Bratislava	27
Democratic Party	18
Good Choice and Moderates	17
Team Region Nitra	14
OĽaNO–NOVA–KÚ–ZZ	13
Mayors and Independent Candidates	10
I am Slovakia	6
Republic	2
Team Ružinov	2
Dawn	1
Home	1
National Coalition	1
Let's Try it Differently	1
Total	890

== Results by region ==
The following tables summarize the elected governors by their party orientation (in notes are also their parties).

Summary of the 29 October 2022 regional election results in Bratislava region
Candidates	2022 Results	
Candidates	%	Votes
Juraj Droba (Liberal (Note: SaS, PS, TB))	63.60	136 983
Ján Mažgút (Nationalist (Note: Direction, SNS))	13.42	28 911
Ivan Bošňák (Centre-right (Note: Together, Chance, ODS, DS))	8.56	18 445
Dušan Velič (Centre-right (Note: KDH, ZĽ, SR, MF))	8.08	17 420
Others	6.29	13 592
Total		219 179

Summary of the 29 October 2022 regional election results in Trnava region
Candidates	2022 Results	
Candidates	%	Votes
Jozef Viskupič (Centre-right (Note: OĽaNO–NOVA–KÚ–ZZ, SaS, Together, Chance, ODS, DS, KDH, ZĽ, SR, OKS, MF))	38.56	69 743
József Berényi (Hungarian minority (Note: Alliance))	21.04	38 056
Martin Červenka (Centre-left (Note: Voice – but official as independent candidate))	16.12	29 157
Zdenko Čambal (Nationalist (Note: Direction, SNS))	11.84	21 426
Martin Beluský (Far-right (Note: ĽSNS))	4.50	8 145
Others	7.59	14 307
Total		180 834

Summary of the 29 October 2022 regional election results in Trenčín Region
Candidates	2022 Results	
Candidates	%	Votes
Jaroslav Baška (Nationalist (Note: Direction, SNS, Voice, SR))	67.25	131 705
Peter Máťoš (Centre-right (Note: SaS, Together, Chance, ODS, DS, KDH, OKS, PS, DVaU))	16.61	32 547
Adrián Mikuš (Independent)	8.33	16 317
Others	7.78	15 268
Total		195 837

Summary of the 29 October 2022 regional election results in Nitra region
Candidates	2022 Results	
Candidates	%	Votes
Branislav Becík (Nationalist (Note: Voice, SR))	27.49	58 765
Milan Belica (Nationalist (Note: Direction, SNS))	21.85	46 710
Tibor Csenger (Hungarian minority (Note: Alliance))	16.65	35 604
Martina Holečková (Centre-right (Note: SaS, Together, Chance, ODS, DS, KDH, OKS, ZĽ, TKN))	15.65	33 467
Lukáš Kyselica (Centre-right (Note: OĽaNO–NOVA–KÚ–ZZ))	5.09	10 897
Martin Kusenda (Independent)	4.27	9 130
Others	8.94	19 141
Total		213 714

Summary of the 29 October 2022 regional election results in Žilina region
Candidates	2022 Results	
Candidates	%	Votes
Erika Jurinová (Centre-right (Note: OĽaNO–NOVA–KÚ–ZZ, SaS, Chance, ODS, DS, ZĽ, SR, OKS))	32.04	80 049
Igor Choma (Centre-left (Note: Direction))	22.24	55 571
Igor Janckulík (Centre-right (Note: KDH, SNS, DVaU))	21.18	52 914
Peter Slyško (Centre-left (Note: Voice))	7.03	17 564
Katarína Boková (Far-right (Note: SHO))	4.45	11 131
Marián Murín (Independent)	3.94	9 852
Others	9.09	22 749
Total		249 830

Summary of the 29 October 2022 regional election results in Banská Bystrica region
Candidates	2022 Results	
Candidates	%	Votes
Ondrej Lunter (Centre (Note: SaS, Together, KDH, OKS, Voice, PS, Alliance – but official as independent candidate))	47.53	96 438
Adrian Polóny (Nationalist (Note: Direction, SNS, SMS, PSN – but official as independent candidate))	15.00	30 436
Rudolf Huliak (Far-right (Note: NK/NEKA))	11.45	23 236
Miroslav Suja (Far-right (Note: Republic))	9.42	19 130
Marek Kotleba (Far-right (Note: ĽSNS))	7.10	14 417
Michal Albert (Far-left (Note: KSS))	3.50	7 102
Others	5.96	12 120
Total		202 879

Summary of the 29 October 2022 regional election results in Prešov Region
Candidates	2022 Results	
Candidates	%	Votes
Milan Majerský (Centre-right (Note: SaS, KDH, ZĽ, SR))	42.01	111 343
Michal Kaliňák (Nationalist (Note: Direction, SNS, Voice, Alliance))	31.39	83 205
Milan Mazurek (Far-right (Note: Republic))	10.88	28 834
Ján Bync (Independent)	4.49	11 921
Michal Biganič (Independent)	3.25	8 634
Others	7.93	21 075
Total		195 837

Summary of the 29 October 2022 regional election results in Košice Region
Candidates	2022 Results	
Candidates	%	Votes
Rastislav Trnka (Centre-right (Note: KDH, Alliance, STANK, Chance, DS))	51.31	110 362
Viliam Zahorčák (Nationalist (Note: Direction, SNS, SR, NK/NEKA, Life, SMS))	15.01	32 287
Róbert Suja (Centre-left (Note: Voice))	6.99	15 040
Juraj Sinay (Independent)	6.80	14 631
Erik Ňarjaš (Centre-right (Note: OĽaNO–NOVA–KÚ–ZZ, ZĽ))	5.54	11 927
Monika Sofiya Soročinová (Independent)	4.71	10 137
Others	9.59	20 697
Total		195 837
