= Varhaňovce =

- Municipality
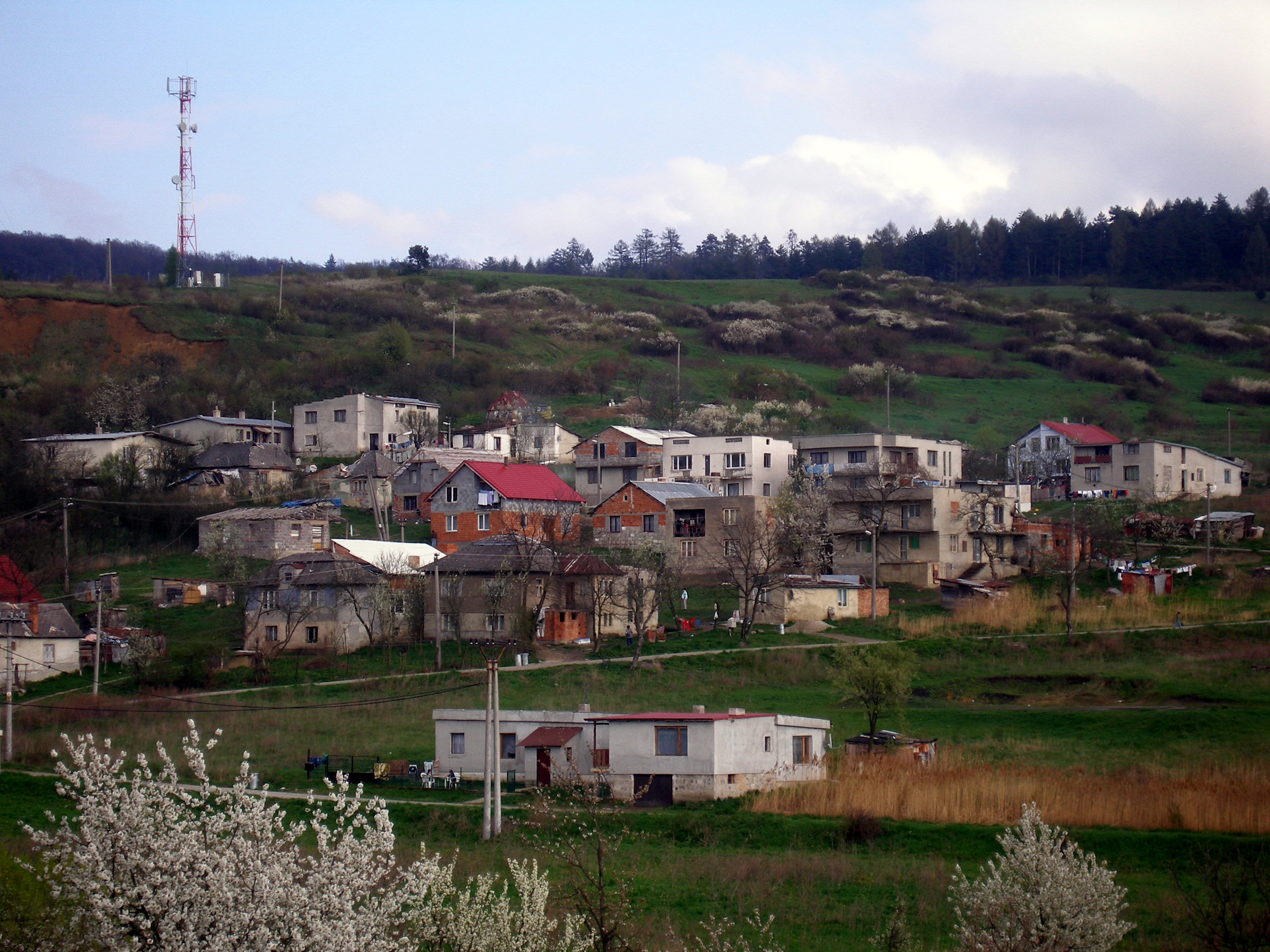

- Flag

- Location of Varhaňovce in the Prešov Region Location of Varhaňovce in Slovakia
- Coordinates: 48.85°N 21.37°E
- Country: Slovakia
- Region: Prešov Region
- District: Prešov District
- First mentioned: 1393

Government
  - Mayor: René Dancák (Hlas–SD, Smer)

Area
  - Total: 8.33 km^{2} (3.22 sq mi)
- Elevation: 272 m (892 ft)

Population (2025)
  - Total: 1,607
- Time zone: UTC+1 (CET)
  - Summer (DST): UTC+2 (CEST)
- Postal code: 820 5
- Area code: +421 51
- Vehicle registration plate (until 2022): PO
- Website: www.obecvarhanovce.sk

Varhaňovce (Rusyn: Варганёвце; Hungarian: Vargony) is a village and municipality in Prešov District in the Prešov Region of eastern Slovakia.

== Geography ==
The municipality lies at an altitude of 272 metres (892 ft) and covers an area of 8.33 km^{2} (3.22 sq mi) (2025).

== Population ==
Population statistic (10 years)
Year	1995	2005	2015	2025
Count	903	1126	1424	1607
Difference		+24.69%	+26.46%	+12.85%

Population statistic
Year	2024	2025
Count	1604	1607
Difference		+0.18%

It has a population of 1607 people (31 December 2025).

=== Ethnicity ===
Census 2021 (1+ %)
Ethnicity	Number	Fraction
Slovak	1350	89.76%
Romani	241	16.02%
Not found out	99	6.58%
Total	1504	

In year 2021 was 1504 people by ethnicity 1350 as Slovak, 241 as Romani, 99 as Not found out, 8 as Czech, 2 as English, 1 as Rusyn and 1 as Hungarian.

Note on population: The difference values of population numbers in the table "Population statistic" and in the sections "Ethnicity" & "Religion" is caused by the use of various statistical methods.

=== Religion ===
Census 2021 (1+ %)
Religion	Number	Fraction
Greek Catholic Church	775	51.53%
Roman Catholic Church	580	38.56%
Not found out	74	4.92%
None	53	3.52%
Total	1504	

In year 2021 was 1504 people by religion 775 from Greek Catholic Church, 580 from Roman Catholic Church, 74 from Not found out, 53 from None, 8 from Christian Congregations in Slovakia, 3 from Jehovah's Witnesses, 3 from Evangelical Church, 2 from Other, 1 from Calvinist Church, 1 from Eastern Orthodox Church, 1 from Paganism and natural spirituality, 1 from United Methodist Church, 1 from Apostolic Church and 1 from Ad hoc movements.

The majority of the municipality's population consists of the members of the local Roma community. In 2019, they constituted an estimated 80% of the population.
