= Lentvora =

Lentvora Lentő
- Municipality
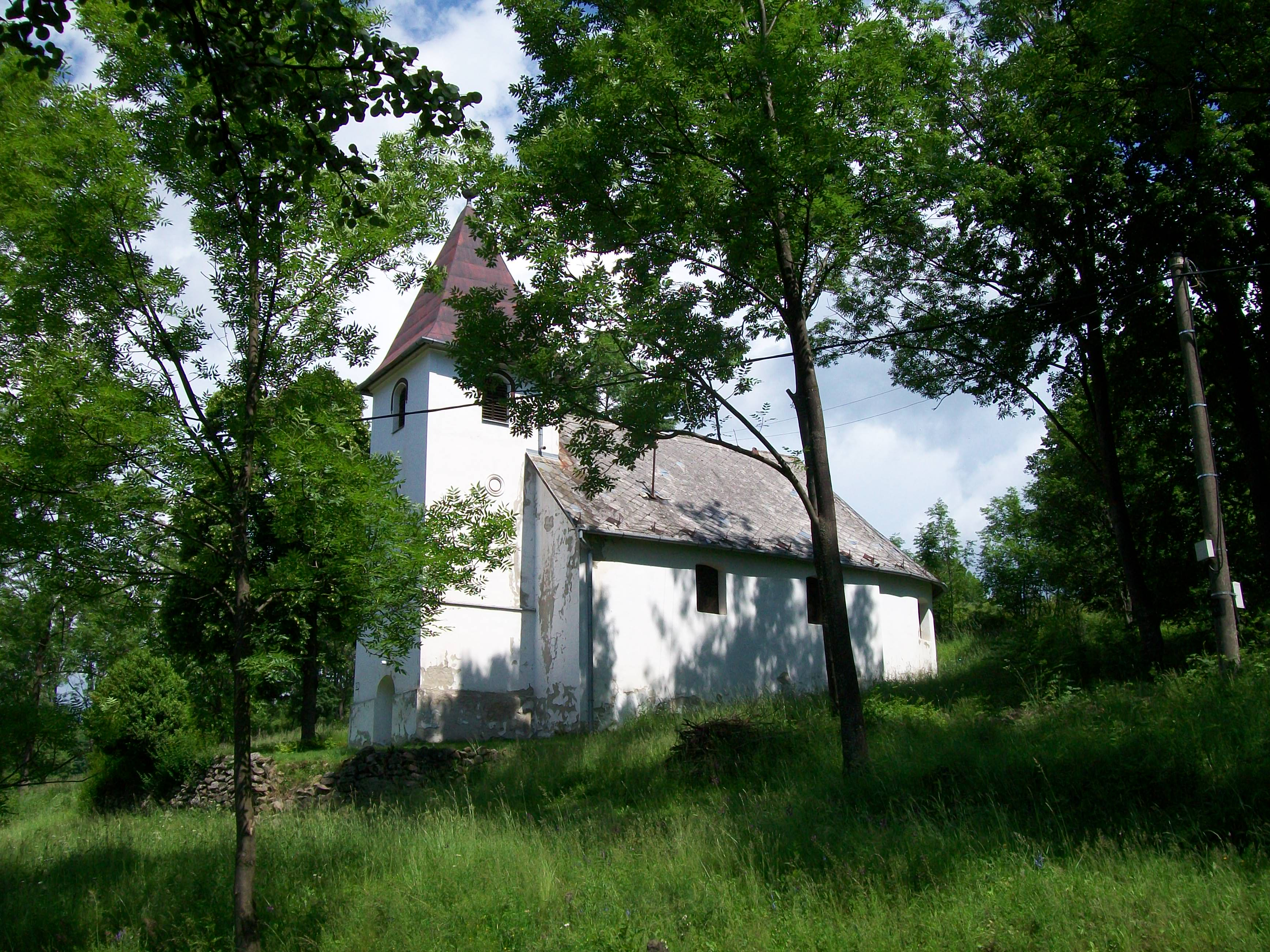
- Lutheran Church in Lentvora

- Flag

- Location of Lentvora in the Banská Bystrica Region Location of Lentvora in Slovakia
- Coordinates: 48.38°N 19.45°E
- Country: Slovakia
- Region: Banská Bystrica Region
- District: Lučenec District
- First mentioned: 1446

Government
  - Mayor: Anna Kropáčová (SMER–SD, HLAS–SD)

Area
  - Total: 13.82 km^{2} (5.34 sq mi)
- Elevation: 548 m (1,798 ft)

Population (2025)
  - Total: 79
- Time zone: UTC+1 (CET)
  - Summer (DST): UTC+2 (CEST)
- Postal code: 985 13
- Area code: +421 47
- Vehicle registration plate (until 2022): LC
- Website: lentvora.sk

Lentvora (Hungarian: Lentő) is a village and municipality in the Lučenec District in the Banská Bystrica Region of Slovakia.

== Geography ==
The municipality lies at an altitude of 548 metres (1,798 ft) and covers an area of 13.82 km^{2} (5.34 sq mi) (2025).

== Population ==
Population statistic (10 years)
Year	1995	2005	2015	2025
Count	95	97	93	79
Difference		+2.10%	−4.12%	−15.05%

Population statistic
Year	2024	2025
Count	79	79
Difference		+0%

It has a population of 79 people (31 December 2025).

=== Ethnicity ===
Census 2021 (1+ %)
Ethnicity	Number	Fraction
Slovak	80	97.56%
Not found out	2	2.43%
Hungarian	1	1.21%
Total	82	

In year 2021 was 82 people by ethnicity 80 as Slovak, 2 as Not found out and 1 as Hungarian.

Note on population: The difference values of population numbers in the table "Population statistic" and in the sections "Ethnicity" & "Religion" is caused by the use of various statistical methods.

=== Religion ===
Census 2021 (1+ %)
Religion	Number	Fraction
Evangelical Church	61	74.39%
None	10	12.2%
Roman Catholic Church	9	10.98%
Not found out	1	1.22%
Seventh-day Adventist Church	1	1.22%
Total	82	

In year 2021 was 82 people by religion 61 from Evangelical Church, 10 from None, 9 from Roman Catholic Church, 1 from Not found out and 1 from Seventh-day Adventist Church.
