= Vyšné Valice =

Vyšné Valice Felsővály
- Municipality
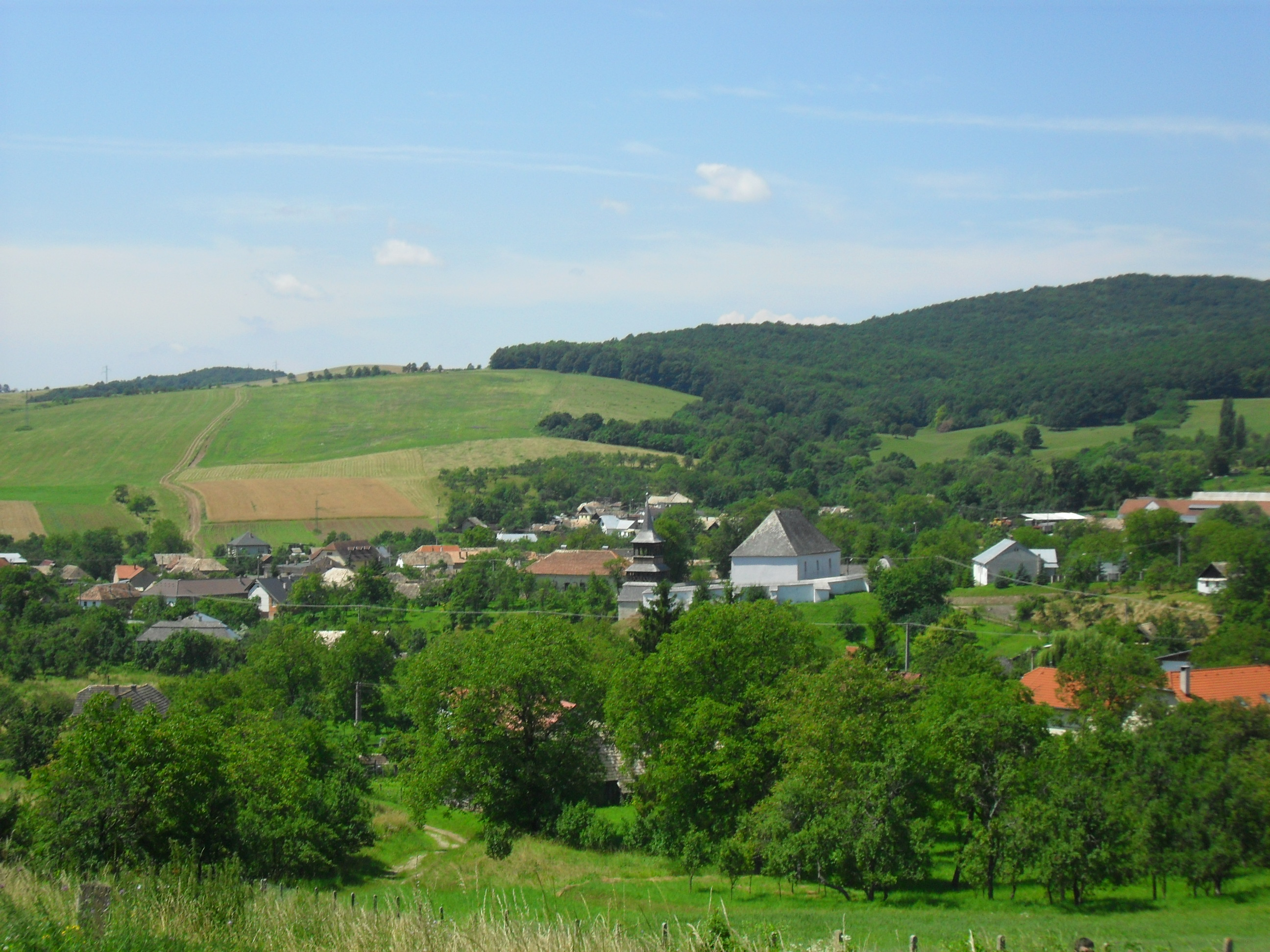

- Flag

- Location of Vyšné Valice in the Banská Bystrica Region Location of Vyšné Valice in Slovakia
- Coordinates: 48.47°N 20.20°E
- Country: Slovakia
- Region: Banská Bystrica Region
- District: Rimavská Sobota District
- First mentioned: 1332

Government
  - Mayor: Ján Záhorský (Hlas-SD)

Area
  - Total: 13.01 km^{2} (5.02 sq mi)
- Elevation: 230 m (750 ft)

Population (2025)
  - Total: 257
- Time zone: UTC+1 (CET)
  - Summer (DST): UTC+2 (CEST)
- Postal code: 982 52
- Area code: +421 47
- Vehicle registration plate (until 2022): RS
- Website: vysnevalice.sk

Vyšné Valice (Hungarian: Felsővály) is a village and municipality in the Rimavská Sobota District of the Banská Bystrica Region of southern Slovakia.

== Geography ==
The municipality lies at an altitude of 230 metres (750 ft) and covers an area of 13.01 km^{2} (5.02 sq mi) (2025).

== Population ==
Population statistic (10 years)
Year	1995	2005	2015	2025
Count	197	323	268	257
Difference		+63.95%	−17.02%	−4.10%

Population statistic
Year	2024	2025
Count	255	257
Difference		+0.78%

It has a population of 257 people (31 December 2025).

=== Ethnicity ===
Census 2021 (1+ %)
Ethnicity	Number	Fraction
Hungarian	226	87.25%
Romani	39	15.05%
Slovak	30	11.58%
Not found out	15	5.79%
Total	259	

In year 2021 was 259 people by ethnicity 226 as Hungarian, 39 as Romani, 30 as Slovak, 15 as Not found out, 1 as Czech and 1 as German.

Note on population: The difference values of population numbers in the table "Population statistic" and in the sections "Ethnicity" & "Religion" is caused by the use of various statistical methods.

=== Religion ===
Census 2021 (1+ %)
Religion	Number	Fraction
Calvinist Church	119	45.95%
Roman Catholic Church	65	25.1%
Not found out	33	12.74%
None	33	12.74%
Evangelical Church	5	1.93%
Total	259	

In year 2021 was 259 people by religion 119 from Calvinist Church, 65 from Roman Catholic Church, 33 from Not found out, 33 from None, 5 from Evangelical Church, 2 from Jehovah's Witnesses and 2 from Greek Catholic Church.
