= Soňa Gaborčáková =

Slovak politician and social worker

Minister of Labor, Social Affairs and Family
- In office 15 April 2023 – 25 October 2023
- Prime Minister: Ľudovít Ódor
- Preceded by: Milan Krajniak
- Succeeded by: Erik Tomáš

State Secretary at the Ministry of Labor, Social Affairs and Family
- In office 21 March 2020 – 15 April 2023

Member of the National Council
- In office 23 March 2016 – 29 February 2020

Personal details
- Born: 20 August 1977 (age 48) Stará Ľubovňa, Czechoslovakia (now Slovakia)
- Party: Ordinary People and Independent Personalities (2016-2019); Christian Democratic Movement (2019-)
- Children: 1
- Education: Matej Bel University; Catholic University in Ružomberok

Soňa Gaborčáková (born 20 August 1977) is a Slovak social worker and politician. From May to October 2023, she served as the Minister of Labor, Social Affairs and Family. Between 2016 and 2020, Gaborčáková served as an MP of the National Council elected on the OĽaNO list. She has served as a municipal assembly member in Stará Ľubovňa since 2014.

== Early life and education ==
Gaborčáková was born on 20 August 1977 in Stará Ľubovňa. She graduated from the Matej Bel University in Banská Bystrica, majoring in social pedagogy and education from 1994 until 1999. Between 2014 and 2015, Gaborčáková received the title of PhDr. at the Catholic University in Ružomberok.

== Career ==
Before entering politics, she worked as the Director of the Saint Anna House in Stará Ľubovňa, an institution founded by Gaborčáková under the patronage of the Greek Catholic Church serving young people with disability.

=== Political career ===
Gaborčáková has been a member of the city council of Stará Ľubovňa since 2014. She won 1,003 votes in the 2014 Slovak parliamentary election and 1,210 votes in the 2018 Slovak local elections.

==== 2020 Slovak parliamentary election ====
In 2019, together with fellow OĽaNO member Elena Červeňáková, Gaborčáková resigned from the OĽaNO parliamentary club and established cooperation with KDH. Both MPs agreed that they would run for the Christian Democratic Movement in the 2020 Slovak parliamentary election. Gaborčáková accepted an offer by Christian Democratic Movement for cooperation because "she considered it to be a stable political party that had supported the Christian values of the last 30 years and not only when it is modern".

When the Christian Democratic Movement almost failed to pass the representation threshold in the 2020 Slovak parliamentary election, Gaborčáková lost her parliamentary mandate. Despite her defeat in the election, she remained active in politics, serving as a State Secretary at the Ministry of Labour, Family and Social Affairs under the Minister Milan Krajniak.

==== 2022 Slovak regional elections ====
In the 2022 Slovak regional elections, Gaborčáková was re-elected as a member of parliament, receiving 862 votes. With a gain of 3,025 votes, she finished in seventh place and did not win one of the four mandates.

==== Minister of Labour, Social Affairs and Family ====
On 12 May 2023, when President Zuzana Čaputová announced the members of the Cabinet of Ľudovít Ódor, Gaborčáková was nominated as Minister of Labour, Social Affairs and Family.
