= Denisa Saková =

Slovak politician (born 1976)

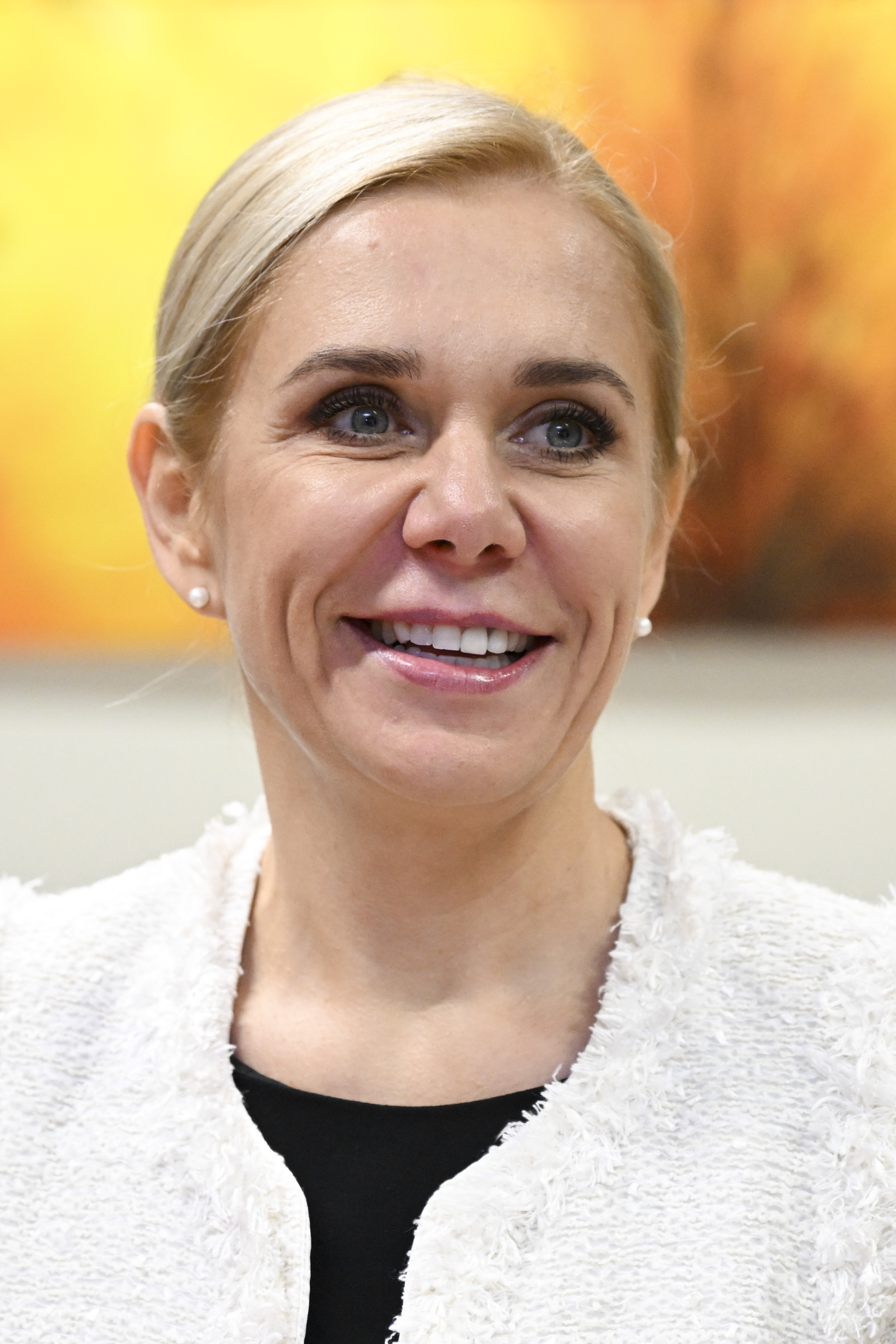
- Saková in 2023

Deputy Prime Minister of Slovakia
- Incumbent
- Assumed office 25 October 2023 Serving with Robert Kaliňák, Peter Kmec and Tomáš Taraba
- Prime Minister: Robert Fico

Minister of Economy
- Incumbent
- Assumed office 25 October 2023
- Prime Minister: Robert Fico
- Preceded by: Peter Dovhun

Minister of Interior
- In office 26 April 2018 – 21 March 2020
- Prime Minister: Peter Pellegrini
- Preceded by: Peter Pellegrini (acting)
- Succeeded by: Roman Mikulec

Member of the National Council
- In office 21 March 2020 – 25 October 2023

Undersecretary of Interior
- In office 22 March 2016 – 26 April 2018
- Minister: Robert Kaliňák; Tomáš Drucker; Peter Pellegrini (acting)

Personal details
- Born: 17 April 1976 (age 50) Nitra, Czechoslovakia (now Slovakia)
- Party: Voice – Social Democracy (2020–present)
- Other political affiliations: Independent (2016–2018); Direction – Social Democracy (2018–2020)
- Education: University of Economics in Bratislava (Ing. PhD.)

Denisa Saková (born 17 April 1976) is a Slovak politician who has been serving as Deputy Prime Minister of Slovakia and Minister of Economy in the Fourth cabinet of Robert Fico since 25 October 2023.

Saková previously served in the Cabinet of Peter Pellegrini as Minister of Interior from 2018 to 2020. Since 2020, she has served as deputy leader of Voice – Social Democracy (Hlas), being part of a group of dissidents from Direction – Social Democracy.

== Early life and education ==
Saková was born on 17 April 1976 in Nitra. She studied Engineering management at University of Economics in Bratislava. She subsequently worked in consulting, in particular in the ICT industry. In 2006 she obtained her PhD from the University of Economics in Bratislava. In 2007, Saková briefly acted as the director of the IT department at the ministry of interior affairs, before returning to the prime sector

== Political career ==
In 2016, Saková joined the Direction – Social Democracy party and she became the Secretary of State at the Ministry of Interior under Minister Robert Kaliňák, who was her political mentor. Following the resignation of Kaliňák due to the Murder of Ján Kuciak in 2018, she took over the ministry.

Prior the 2020 Slovak parliamentary election, Saková criticized the participation of Slovaks living abroad on the election, sparking fears of her potentially using her office to complicate voting from abroad. After the election, she was among a large group of Direction MPs, who split from the party and started the new Voice – Social Democracy.

Saková became the minister of economy after the 2023 Slovak parliamentary election. Immediately after the election, she claimed Ukraine should give up its territory to end the Russian invasion of Ukraine.
