= Kamil Šaško =

Slovak politician (born 1985)

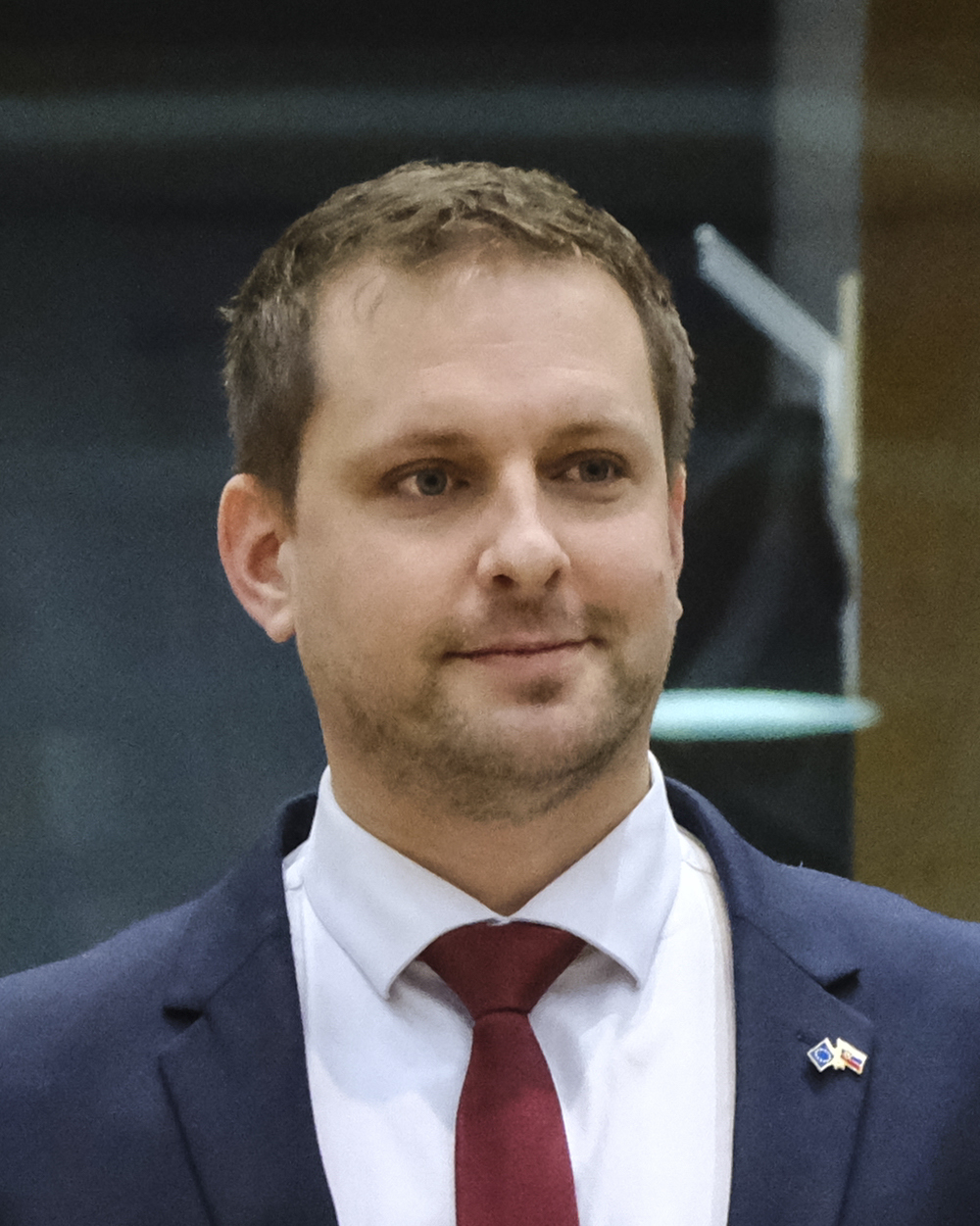
- Šaško in 2023

Minister of Health
- Incumbent
- Assumed office 10 October 2024
- Prime Minister: Robert Fico
- Preceded by: Zuzana Dolinková

Personal details
- Born: 5 November 1985 (age 40) Poprad, Czechoslovakia
- Party: Voice - Social Democracy
- Education: University of Sussex; London School of Business and Finance

Kamil Šaško (born 5 November 1985) is a Slovak politician. Since 10 October 2024 he has served as the Minister of Health of Slovakia.

== Biography ==
Šaško was born on 5 November 1985 in Poprad. He studied management at the University of Sussex and finance at the London School of Business and Finance. Šaško joined the Ministry of Finance in 2014, focusing on capital market regulation before switching to the Slovak representation at the Committee of Permanent Representatives in Brussels one year later. In 2020, he joined the National Bank of Slovakia.

In the 2023 Slovak parliamentary election, Šaško was elected MP of the National Council of Slovakia on the list of Voice – Social Democracy. He joined the government as the secretary of state at the ministry of economy. Following the resignation of the health minister Zuzana Dolinková, Šaško was promoted to her former position.

In 2024, Šaško faced a doctors' strike for better conditions. More than 3,300 doctors submitted their resignations. The government passed a bill according to which, when an emergency situation is declared, doctors can face up to one year in prison or a 1,500€ fine for refusing to work and up to five years if a patient is harmed as a consequence of their departure. Šaško considered using emergency situations in districts with the highest resignation rates. Ultimately the government signed an agreement with the doctors' union with numerous concessions.
