= Richard Takáč =

Slovak politician

- Takáč in November 2025

Minister of Agriculture and Rural Development
- Incumbent
- Assumed office 25 October 2023
- Prime Minister: Robert Fico
- Preceded by: Jozef Bíreš

Member of the National Council
- In office 20 March 2020 – 25 October 2023

Personal details
- Born: 10 May 1982 (age 44) Prievidza, Czechoslovakia
- Party: Direction – Social Democracy
- Spouse: Petra Krištúfková
- Education: Slovak University of Agriculture in Nitra

Richard Takáč (born 10 May 1982) is a Slovak politician who has served as Minister of Agriculture of Slovakia since 2023. He is also a former deputy of the Trenčín self-governing region and a deputy of the city of Prievidza.

== Early life and education ==
Takáč was born on 10 May 1982 in Prievidza. His father was a miner whilst his mother worked as a saleswoman. He graduated from the Secondary Vocational School of Agriculture in 1996 and 2000, later Faculty of Agrobiology and Food Resources of the Slovak University of Agriculture in Nitra. During the first government of Smer with ĽS-HZDS and SNS from 2006 until 2010, he served as head of the Prievidza branch of Slovak Land Fund and worked there until 2011.

=== Political career ===
==== Communal and regional politics (2010-2020) ====
In the 2010 Slovak parliamentary election, Takáč was elected as a city deputy in the fourth electoral district in Prievidza as a nominee of the parties SMER-SD and SNS.

In the 2013 Slovak regional elections, Takáč ran for the SMER-SD party as a deputy of the Trenčín Self-Governing Region (TSK), and was elected with 3,054 votes. He was one of the vice-chairmen of the TSK between 2014 and 2018. Later, Takáč was re-elected as a Priévidz city councilor, winning 774 votes as a SMER-SD candidate.

In the 2017 Slovak regional elections, Takáč was re-elected as a member of the Trenčín VÚC in the elections to the bodies of self-governing regions, receiving 5,625 votes as a candidate of the SMER-SD party.

In the 2018 Slovak local elections, Takáč ran as a candidate of the SMER-SD, SNS, and Green Party coalition for the post of mayor of Prievidza. Takáč finished second place with 3,674 votes (23.7%), only to be re-elected after losing against defending mayor Katarína Macháčková.

==== National politics (2020-present) ====
In the 2020 Slovak parliamentary election, Takáč finished 34th place of SMER-SD candidate with 2,217 preferential votes. He served as Minister of Agriculture and Rural Development for reviewing the decisions of the NBU. At the SMER-SD party congress on 18 July 2020, Takáč was elected vice-chairman of the party.

In the 2022 Slovak regional elections, Takač finished fourth place with 9,189 votes. He later ran for the post of deputy of Prievidza, defending his mandate as a SMERu-SD candidate with a gain of 908 votes. Takač gave up his mandates in the councils of the city of Prievidza and the Trenčín self-governing region after being appointed as a minister in October 2023.

In the 2023 Slovak parliamentary election, Takáč finished fourth place with 68,842 preferential votes and was elected as a member of the National Council of Slovakia, but did not take over the mandate.
