= Zuzana Dolinková =

Slovak politician

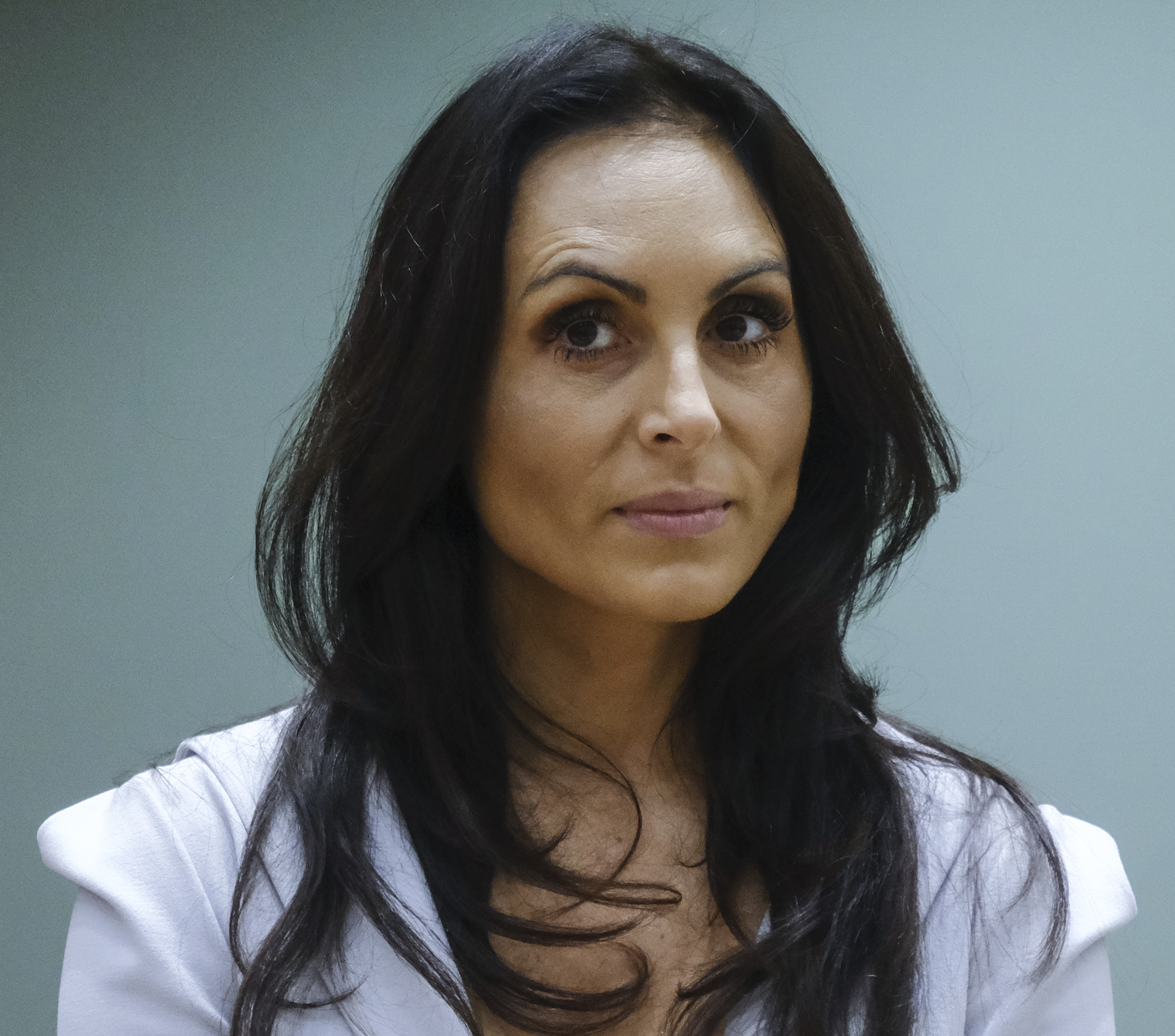
- Dolinková in 2023

Minister of Health
- In office 25 October 2023 – 10 October 2024
- Prime Minister: Robert Fico
- Preceded by: Michal Palkovič
- Succeeded by: Kamil Šaško

Personal details
- Born: 20 January 1983 (age 43) Topoľčany, Czechoslovakia
- Party: Voice – Social Democracy (2021–present)
- Other political affiliations: Good Choice (2019–2020)
- Children: 2

Zuzana Dolinková (born 20 January 1983) is a Slovak lawyer and politician. She has served as the Minister of Health of Slovakia from October 2023 to October 2024.

== Early life ==
Dolinková was born on 20 January 1983 in Topoľčany. She graduated in law from the Comenius University in 2007, after which she practiced law in the private sector. From 2015 to 2021, Dolinková led the Association of Outpatient Providers (Zväz ambulantných poskytovateľov), a union of private providers of healthcare.

== Career ==
In the 2020 Slovak parliamentary election, Dolinková failed to run for the parliament on the list of the Good Choice party, which failed to pass the representation threshold. As the healthcare expert of the party, she supported continuing the construction of the new hospital at Rázsochy.

Following the merger of Good Choice with Voice – Social Democracy, Dolinková ran on the Voice list in the 2023 Slovak parliamentary election, joining the government as Minister of Health. She won a seat but did not become MP due to Slovak constitutional requirement forbidding government ministers to also serve as MPs.

On 4 October 2024, Dolinková announced her resignation as Health minister due to austerity measures approved by government impacting health service. Wages of doctors were supposed to increase by 9,66% in 2025 but would increase only by 3% due to the measures, meaning that there will not be any rise in real wages due to inflation. This move was opposed by doctor's and nurse's unions.

== Personal life ==
Dolinková is divorced and has two children.
