= Dušan Keketi (footballer) =

Slovak footballer

Personal information
- Full name: Dušan Keketi
- Date of birth: 24 March 1951 (age 75)
- Place of birth: Bratislava, Czechoslovakia
- Position: Goalkeeper

Youth career
- Spoje Bratislava
- 1967–1969: ČH Bratislava

Senior career*
Years	Team	Apps	(Gls)
1969–1976	Spartak Trnava	136	(0)
1976–1977	Dukla Banská Bystrica		
1977–1983	Spartak Trnava	173	(0)
1983–1986	Austria Klagenfurt	67	(0)

International career
1973–1980	Czechoslovakia	7	(0)
- * Club domestic league appearances and goals

Dušan Keketi (born 24 March 1951) is a Slovak former footballer who played as a goalkeeper and current president of Spartak Trnava.

During his career he played for mostly for Trnava, and earned 7 caps for the Czechoslovakia from 1973 to 1980, participating in UEFA Euro 1980.

His son is the politician Dušan Keketi.
