= Ministry of Tourism and Sport (Slovakia) =

Government ministry of Slovakia

Ministry of Tourism and Sport of the Slovak Republic
- Ministerstvo cestovného ruchu a športu Slovenskej republiky
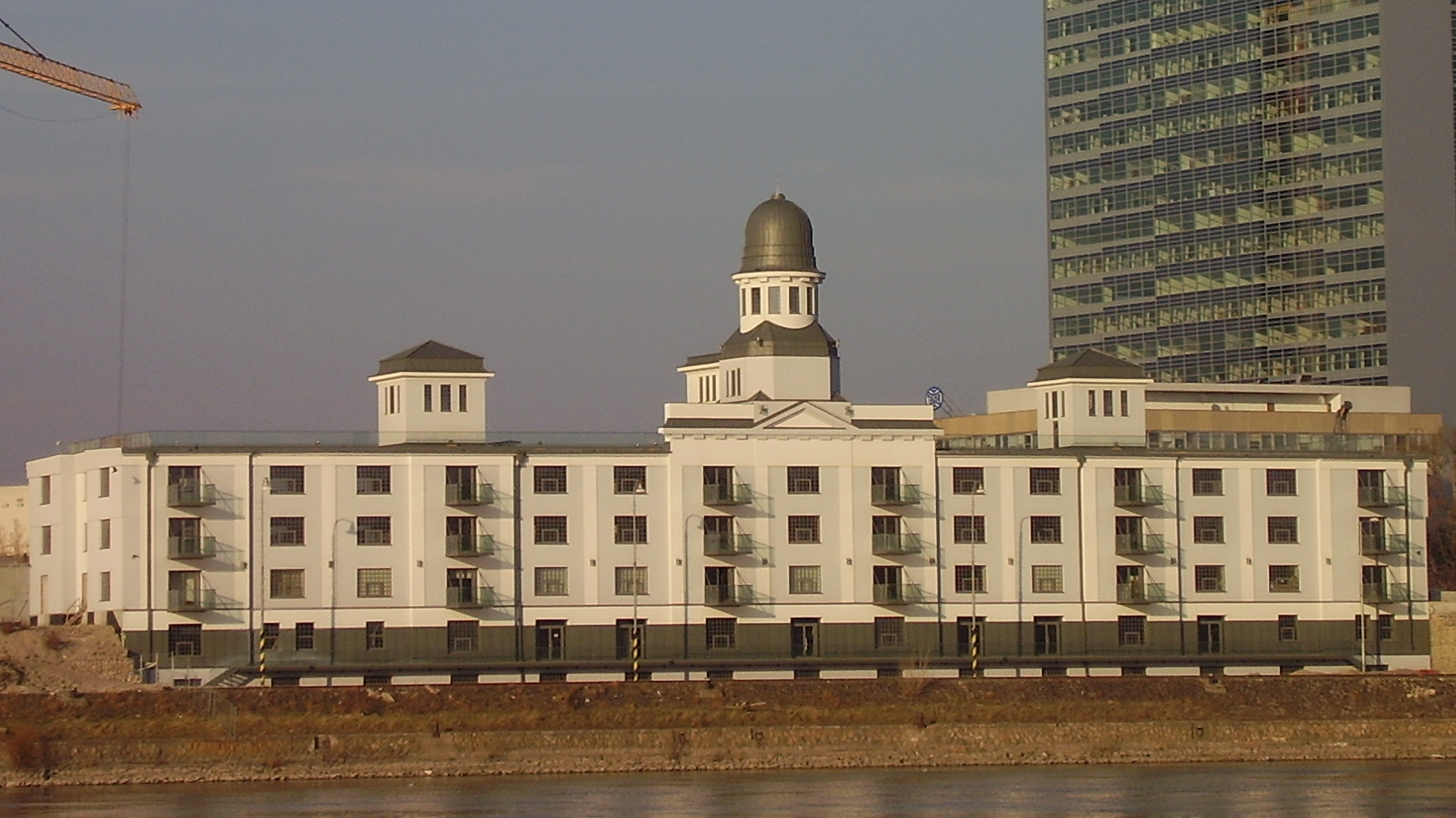

Agency overview
- Formed: February 1, 2024; 2 years ago
- Website: mincrs.sk

The Ministry of Tourism and Sport of the Slovak Republic (Slovak: Ministerstvo cestovného ruchu a športu Slovenskej republiky, MCRaŠ SR) is one of the 15 ministries of Slovakia. The ministry was established on 1 February 2024 by Amendment 7/2024 Coll. to the Competence Act, adopted on 16 January 2024 during the fourth government of Robert Fico at the initiative of the SNS. It took over the mandate for tourism and sport that previously fell under the ministries of transport and education.

== History ==
On 11 October, the chairmen of the new three-party coalition formed by the SMER-SD, HLAS-SD and SNS parties, which emerged from the 2023 parliamentary elections, signed a memorandum of understanding. In the memorandum, they redistributed ministries in the new fourth government of Robert Fico, with the agreement that a new Ministry of Tourism and Sport would be created, which would be led by the SNS. Andrej Danko had already been trying to create the ministry during previous governments, when in 2019 he declared that he would do everything possible to ensure that the new ministry was established in early 2021. At the end of December 2023, Fico's government approved a draft amendment to the Act on the Organization of Government Activities and the Organization of Central State Administration, in which it proposed the establishment of a new Ministry of Tourism and Sport of the Slovak Republic from 1 January 2024. The amendment to the Act on the Organization of Government Activities and Central State Administration was approved in a shortened legislative procedure on 20 December 2023 in the National Assembly of the Slovak Republic by 77 members of the coalition during the fourth government of Robert Fico. The ministry was supposed to be established on 1 January 2024, but President Zuzana Čaputová vetoed the act on 2 January 2024, due to reservations about the change in the method of appointment and dismissal of the chairmen of the Statistical Office of the Slovak Republic and the Health Care Supervision Authority. On 16 January 2024, 77 members of the National Assembly of the Slovak Republic overrode the president's veto and re-approved the amendment to the act, in which they set the establishment of the ministry for 1 February. The ministry was thus established on 1 February 2024 by Amendment 7/2024 Coll. to the Competence Act. The ministry employs 200 to 250 employees, with a budget of approximately 260 million euros per year. The ministry is headquartered in Warehouse No. 7, a business and administrative center on the Danube embankment.

== See also ==
- List of ministries of sports
