= Ľutina =

- Municipality
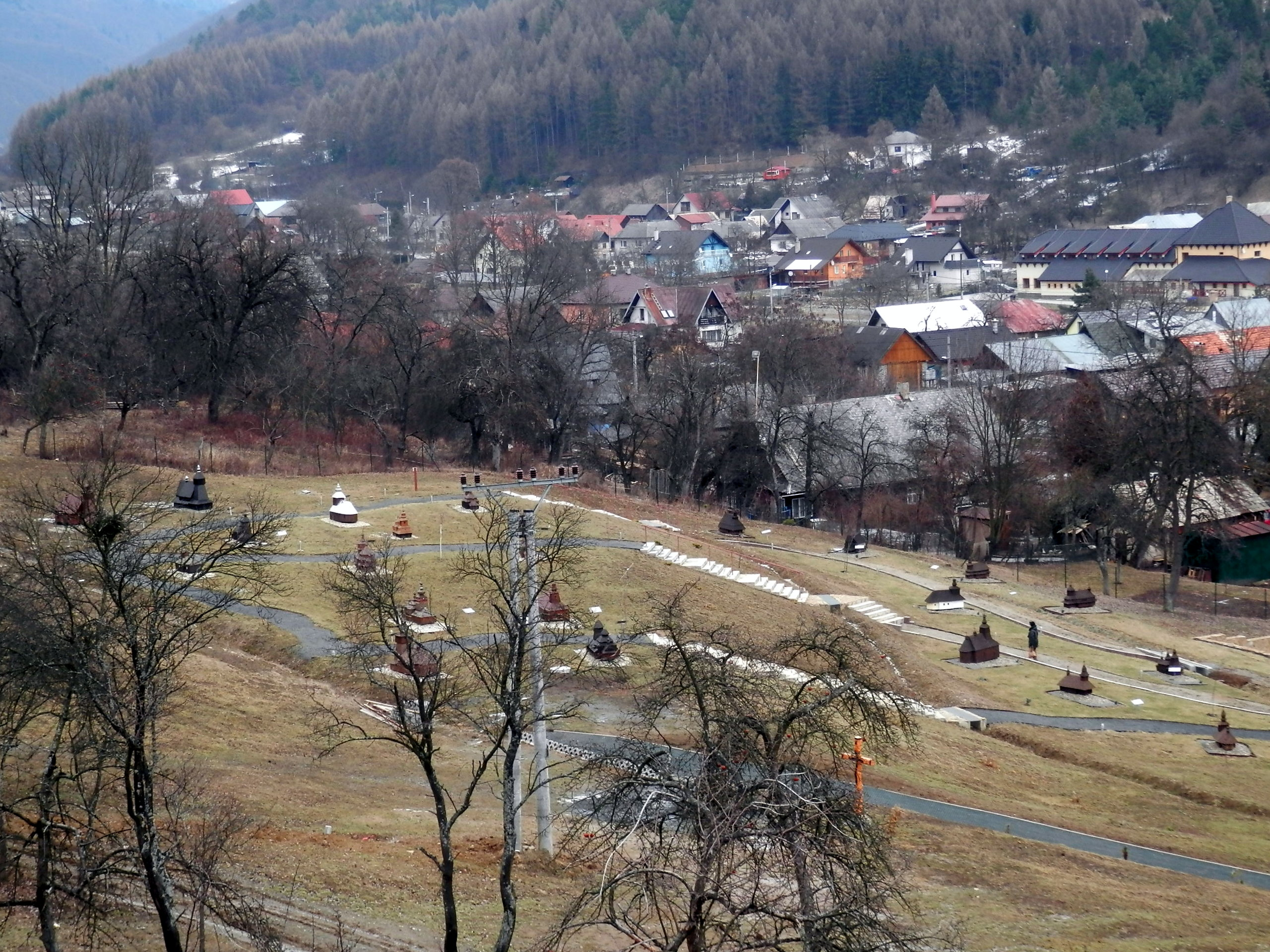

- Flag

- Location of Ľutina in the Prešov Region Location of Ľutina in Slovakia
- Coordinates: 49.17°N 21.05°E
- Country: Slovakia
- Region: Prešov Region
- District: Sabinov District
- First mentioned: 1330

Area
  - Total: 6.90 km^{2} (2.66 sq mi)
- Elevation: 429 m (1,407 ft)

Population (2025)
  - Total: 470
- Time zone: UTC+1 (CET)
  - Summer (DST): UTC+2 (CEST)
- Postal code: 825 7
- Area code: +421 51
- Vehicle registration plate (until 2022): SB
- Website: www.lutina.sk

Ľutina is a village and municipality in Sabinov District in the Prešov Region of north-eastern Slovakia.

== Etymology ==
The name comes from Slavic ľutъ: wild, malicious (the name of the stream Ľutinka/Ľutina that runs through the village).

== History ==
In historical records the village was first mentioned in 1330.

== Geography ==
The municipality lies at an altitude of 429 metres (1,407 ft) and covers an area of 6.90 km^{2} (2.66 sq mi) (2025).

== Population ==
Population statistic (10 years)
Year	1995	2005	2015	2025
Count	426	435	477	470
Difference		+2.11%	+9.65%	−1.46%

Population statistic
Year	2024	2025
Count	483	470
Difference		−2.69%

It has a population of 470 people (31 December 2025).

=== Ethnicity ===
Census 2021 (1+ %)
Ethnicity	Number	Fraction
Slovak	470	96.5%
Rusyn	16	3.28%
Not found out	13	2.66%
Other	5	1.02%
Total	487	

In year 2021 was 487 people by ethnicity 470 as Slovak, 16 as Rusyn, 13 as Not found out, 5 as Other, 1 as Ukrainian and 1 as Polish.

Note on population: The difference values of population numbers in the table "Population statistic" and in the sections "Ethnicity" & "Religion" is caused by the use of various statistical methods.

=== Religion ===
Census 2021 (1+ %)
Religion	Number	Fraction
Greek Catholic Church	377	77.41%
Roman Catholic Church	66	13.55%
None	17	3.49%
Eastern Orthodox Church	13	2.67%
Not found out	11	2.26%
Total	487	

In year 2021 was 487 people by religion 377 from Greek Catholic Church, 66 from Roman Catholic Church, 17 from None, 13 from Eastern Orthodox Church, 11 from Not found out, 1 from Jehovah's Witnesses, 1 from Islam and 1 from Evangelical Church.
