= Ministry of Interior (Slovakia) =

Government ministry of Slovakia

Ministry of Internal Affairs of the Slovak Republic
- Ministerstvo vnútra Slovenskej republiky
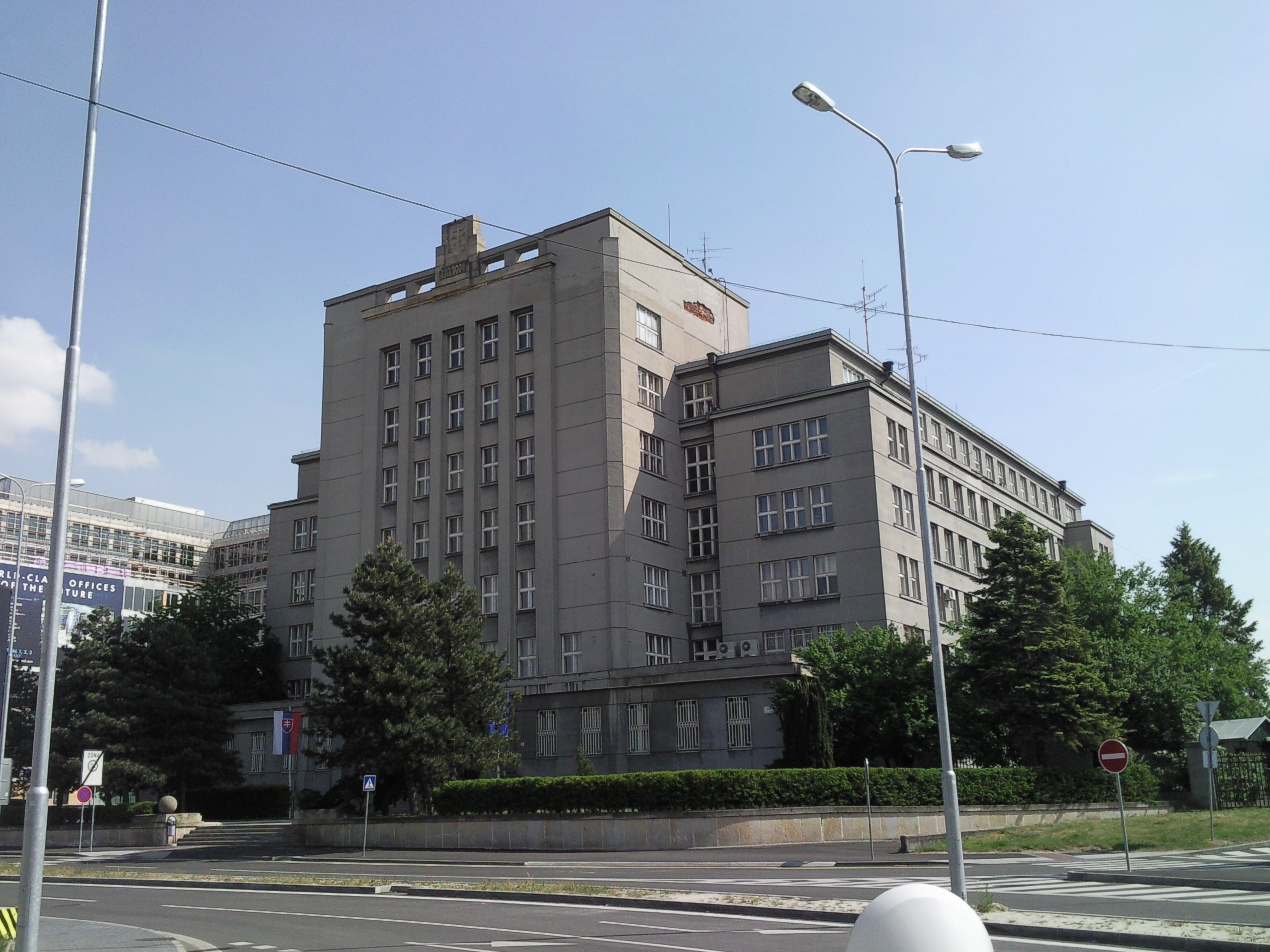
- Ministry headquarters in Ružinov, Bratislava

Agency overview
- Jurisdiction: Government of Slovakia
- Headquarters: 2 Pribinova str. Bratislava; 48°08′26″N 17°07′07″E
- Website: minv.sk

The Ministry of Interior of the Slovak Republic (Slovak: Ministerstvo vnútra Slovenskej republiky) is a government ministry of Slovakia. Since 25 October 2023, the current minister is Matúš Šutaj Eštok. From 15 May 2023 until 25 October 2023 the Minister of the Interior has been Ivan Šimko. Roman Mikulec was minister from March 2020 to May 2023, and in the previous 2018–2020 government the department was headed by Denisa Saková.
