= Slovak nationalism =

Ideology in Europe

Coat of arms of Slovakia.

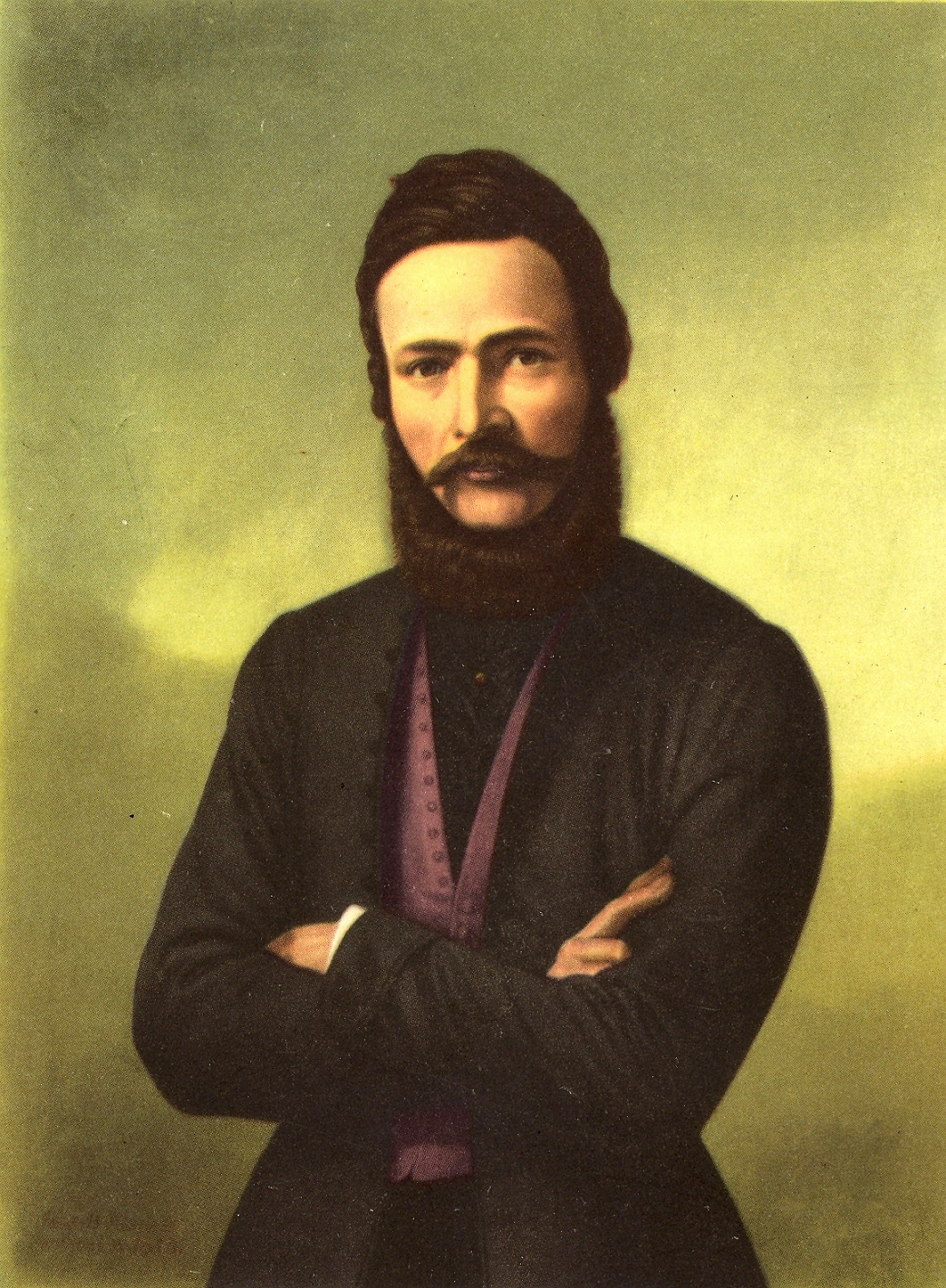
Leader of the Slovak national revival Ľudovít Štúr in the 19th century.

Slovak nationalism is an ethnic nationalist ideology that asserts that the Slovaks are a nation and promotes the cultural unity of the Slovaks.

== History ==
Modern Slovak nationalism first arose in the 19th century in response to Magyarization of Slovak-inhabited territories in the Kingdom of Hungary. It was based on two main ideas: a historical state right based on a continuity with the early medieval Great Moravian Empire and an identity associated with the Slavs.

== Ethnic and civic nationalism ==
During the century-long period spanning from Slovakia's semi-independence as part of democratic Czechoslovakia in 1918, to the liberal democratic independent republic of the early 2020s, Slovak nationalism had gradually evolved into several different ideological strands.

One is the continued ethnic nationalism, focused mainly on the Slovak ethnic majority and Slovakia as a primarily Slovak nation state. This nationalism occurs both in moderate and radical forms. The other major strand is civic nationalism, which emphasizes more of a patriotic perspective, focused on Slovakia as a homeland of both the major ethnicity (Slovaks) and all of Slovakia's ethnic, religious and other minorities. Though more traditional ethnic nationalism is still influential in Slovakia, modern civic nationalism has gradually grown in significance, and forms the dominant view in today's Slovakia.

Due to Slovakia's long historical existence without its own separate and sovereign national government, the various expressions of Slovak nationalism have continued to develop in complex ways. The civic nationalist view of the country had developed and grown in significance especially during the democratic eras of the country's history, particularly after Slovakia's full independence in 1993. With the country's democratic independence issue resolved, the focus of both ethnic nationalists and civic nationalists has shifted away from the original focus of Slovak nationalism, as originally established in the 19th century (i.e. achievement of political and cultural representation and self-governance).

Slovakia's transfer from a repressed society with a Soviet-imposed totalitarian government and planned economy (1948–1989) back to a liberal-democratic society, with a mixed-market economy and membership in the EU (after 1989 and 1993) has also influenced the nature of Slovak nationalism. Despite certain domestic tensions in the 1990s, a civic nationalist view of domestic minorities had ultimately become the dominant perspective since the 1990s. This coincided with a lasting improvement of relations with some neighbouring countries (Hungary, Ukraine) by the early 2000s, as well as with a general trend of civic nationalist views being very supportive of an active, democratically minded and transparency-focused civic society in Slovakia during the early 21st century. Support for civic society has also been voiced among more moderate ethnic nationalists, though unambiguous support for a modern civic society remains more contested among contemporary ethnic nationalists. Radical civic nationalism is almost non-existent in contemporary Slovakia, whereas radical ethnic nationalism is represented a fairly vocal minority in Slovak politics and certain parts of Slovak society.

A populist political approach occurs among both ethnic nationalist and civic nationalist political parties and other groups.

== Slovak nationalist parties ==
- Slovak National Party (1871–1938)
- Slovak People's Party (1913–1945)
- Juriga's Slovak People's Party (1925–1938)
- Slovak National Party (1989–present) – populist nationalism
- People's Party – Movement for a Democratic Slovakia (1991–2014)
- Direction – Social Democracy (1999–present) – left-wing nationalism
- True Slovak National Party (2001–2005)
- Conservative Democrats of Slovakia (2008–2014)
- Kotleba – People's Party Our Slovakia (2010–present) – far-right nationalism
- We Are Family (2015–present) – right-wing nationalism
- Rural Party (2014–2022)
- Slovak Patriot (2021–2026)
- Republic Movement (2022–present)

== See also ==
- Nationalism
- Slovjak movement
