= Matúš Šutaj Eštok =

Slovak politician (born 1987)

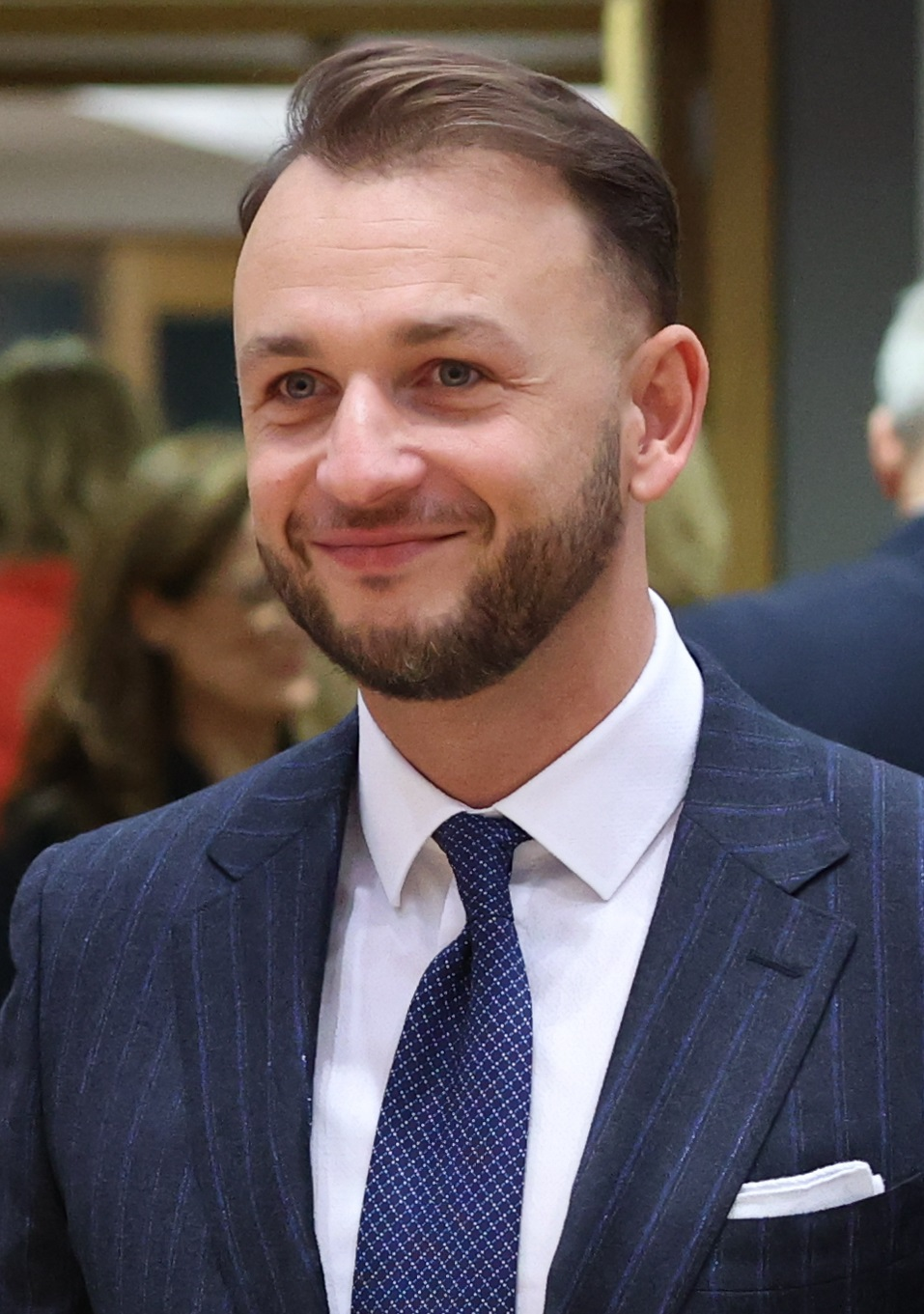
- Šutaj Eštok in 2023

Minister of Interior
- Incumbent
- Assumed office 25 October 2023
- Prime Minister: Robert Fico
- Preceded by: Ľudovít Ódor (acting)

Member of the National Council
- In office 21 March 2020 – 25 October 2023

Chairman of Voice – Social Democracy
- Incumbent
- Assumed office 1 June 2024
- Preceded by: Peter Pellegrini

Personal details
- Born: 4 February 1987 (age 39) Budkovce, Czechoslovakia
- Party: Voice – Social Democracy (since 2020)
- Other political affiliations: Direction – Social Democracy (until 2020)
- Education: Comenius University

Matúš Šutaj Eštok (born 4 February 1987) is a Slovak politician who has served as the Minister of Interior of Slovakia since 2023. He was an MP of the National Council.

== Early life and education ==
In 2011, Šutaj Eštok majored in law from Comenius University. He worked as the lawyer for the Comenius University. Šutaj Eštok served as chairman of the Government Office of the Slovak Republic from 2018 until 2020. He can speak English and German apart from his native Slovak.

== Political career ==
=== 2020 Slovak parliamentary election ===
In the 2020 Slovak parliamentary election, Šutaj Eštok was elected to parliament on the list of the Direction – Social Democracy (SMER-SD) party. He left SMER-SD and joined the newly-founded Voice – Social Democracy party later that November.

=== Dismissal of Štefan Hamran ===
On 10 October 2023, after then-president of Slovak Police Force Štefan Hamran announced his resignation, Šutaj Eštok dismissed Hamran from his position three days before Hamran's planned retirement and transferred him to the District Directorate of the Slovak Police Force in Poprad.

The same year on 15 November, Šutaj Eštok has temporarily appointed Ľubomír Solák as president of the Slovak Police Force. On 29 November, Šutaj Eštok announced that he appointed Solák as president of Slovak Police Force permanently. The former also abolished his positions as first vice president and established a new position of vice president for migration.

=== Ministry of Interior ===
In the 2023 Slovak parliamentary election, Šutaj Eštok finished tenth place with 27,093 votes, later becoming Minister of Interior of Slovakia. He was the first minister of Fico's Fourth Cabinet to face a vote of no confidence. The opposition blamed his for unlawfully sacking police investigators working on the corruption cases of previous government of Robert Fico and wasting public resources on ineffective massive migration crackdowns. Nonetheless, the no confidence vote failed to gain a majority of votes in the National Council. Šutaj Eštok was also criticised for the measures on the Slovak–Hungarian border, which the opposition considers to be a theatrical measure.

== Personal life ==
Šutaj Eštok was married to Martina Jančíková, who worked as an assistant to then-member of Slovak National Council, Erika Jurinová. He has two children with his partner, Anna.
