= Boris Susko =

Slovak politician

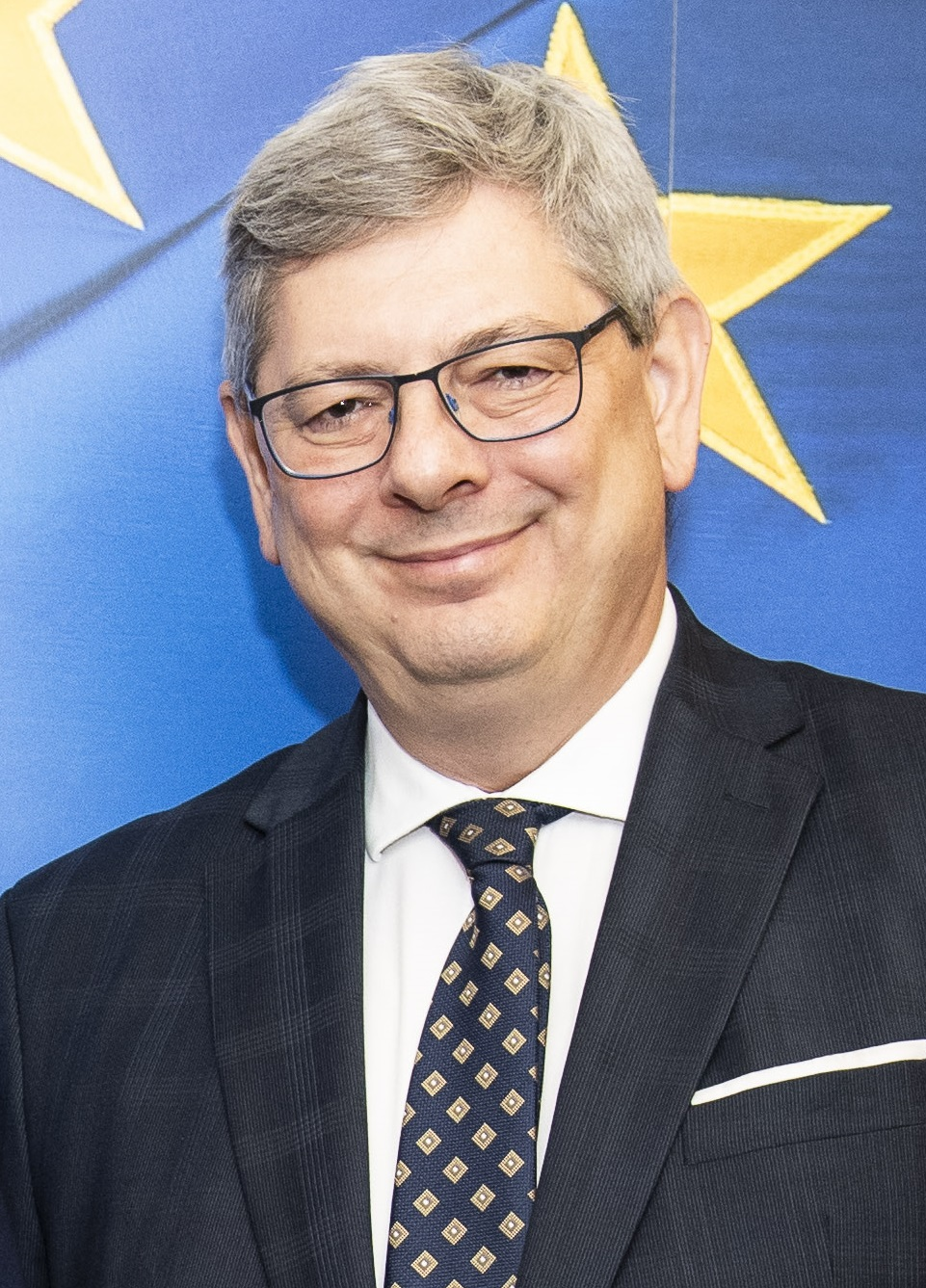
- Susko in 2024

Minister of Justice
- Incumbent
- Assumed office 25 October 2023
- Prime Minister: Robert Fico
- Preceded by: Jana Dubovcová

Member of the National Council
- In office 21 March 2020 – 25 October 2023
- In office 4 April 2012 – 23 March 2016

State Secretary of Environment
- In office 2016–2020
- Minister: László Sólymos; Árpád Érsek (acting)

Personal details
- Born: 26 May 1970 (age 55) Bratislava, Czechoslovakia
- Party: Direction – Social Democracy
- Relations: Peter Susko (Brother)
- Children: 1

Boris Susko (born 26 May 1970) is a Slovak politician and lawyer who serves as the Minister of Justice of Slovakia.

== Biography ==
In 1995, Susko graduated in law from the Comenius University, where he also obtained a PhD. in criminal law in 2002. Following graduation, Susko taught at the Comenius University and Danubius University. Between 2005 and 2023 he was also active as an attorney.

In 2012 Slovak parliamentary election he won a seat in the National Council of Slovakia on the list of the Direction – Social Democracy (SMER-SD) party. From 2016 to 2020, he served as a state secretary at the Ministry of Environment. From 2020 until 2023, he again served as an MP.

In October 2023, Susko became Minister of Justice in the Fico's Fourth Cabinet.
