= Erik Tomáš =

Slovak politician and former television presenter

Minister of Labour, Social Affairs and Family
- Incumbent
- Assumed office 25 October 2023
- Prime Minister: Robert Fico
- Preceded by: Soňa Gaborčáková

Member of the National Council
- In office 15 August 2016 – 25 October 2023

Personal details
- Born: 15 June 1975 (age 51) Humenné, Czechoslovakia
- Party: Voice – Social Democracy (2020–present)
- Other political affiliations: Independent (2016–2018); Direction – Social Democracy (2018–2020)
- Spouse: Henrieta Tomášová
- Children: 2
- Education: Comenius University

Erik Tomáš (born 15 June 1975) is a Slovak politician and former television presenter. Since October 2023, he has served as the minister of labor, social affairs and family of Slovakia. Tomáš was a member of the National Council of Slovakia from 2016 until 2023, and state secretary at the ministry of Education in 2016.

== Early life and education ==
Erik Tomáš was born on 15 June 1975 in Humenné. He graduated from Comenius University, majoring in biography and geography. Following his graduation until 2006, Tomáš worked as a television presented at the Regina Radio and TV Markíza.

== Political career ==
In 2006, Tomáš started cooperating with the Direction – Social Democracy (Smer) party. He was the spokesperson of the minister of interior affairs Robert Kaliňák from 2006 until 2010, Smer in 2010, and the government, 2012 to 2016 he was the spokesperson of the government.

In the 2016 Slovak parliamentary election, Tomáš was elected an MP of the National Council on the Smer list. From March to August 2016, he briefly served as a state secretary at the ministry of education. For the remainder of the term, Tomáš was an MP and the chief media strategist of the prime minister Robert Fico. He became a member of Smer in 2018.

In the 2020 Slovak parliamentary election, Tomáš retained his seat. Nonetheless, after the election, he was among those Smer MPs, who joined the former MP Peter Pellegrini who split from Smer to establish a new party Voice – Social Democracy. Tomáš' had been seen by the media as being close to Smer leader Robert Fico, which is why his defection was particularly surprising.

Following the 2023 Slovak parliamentary election, Tomáš was elected to parliament again, becoming the labor minister.

== Personal life ==
Tomáš is married to a woman named Henrieta.
