= Slovak Patriot =

Political party in Slovakia

Slovak Patriot Slovenský patriot
- Chairman: Miroslav Radačovský
- Vice Chairman: Miroslav Jäger
- Founder: Miroslav Radačovský
- Founded: 10 February 2021
- Dissolved: 3 February 2026
- Headquarters: Skalnatá 175/3, 05375 Hnilec
- Membership (2022): ▼75
- Ideology: Slovak nationalism; Social conservatism; Russophilia; Soft Euroscepticism
- Political position: Right-wing to far-right
- National affiliation: Slovak National Party
- European affiliation: EAFD (2021–2023)
- Colours: Slovak national colours: White; Blue; Red
- Slogan: "Competence, competence, patriotism and again competence"; (Slovak: Odbornosť, odbornosť, patriotizmus a ešte raz odbornosť)

Website
- slovenskypatriot.sk

Slovak Patriot (Slovak: Slovenský patriot, styled as Slovenský PATRIOT), originally founded in 2021 as the Real National Party – PATRIOT (Note: Slovak: Reálna Národná Strana – PATRIOT; RNS – PATRIOT) was a Slovak political party. It was founded in 2021 by Miroslav Radačovský, MEP. Later, the party was renamed Slovak PATRIOT. The party was the only one registered in 2021 by collecting a sufficient number of signatures.

== Party leadership ==
The party's presidency had nine members:

- Miroslav Radačovský – Chairman
  - Miroslav Jäger – vice-chairman
  - Lívia Radačovská Adamová – vice-chairman
    - Michal Radačovský – speaker

== Election results ==
=== European Parliament ===
Election	List leader	Votes	%	Rank	Seats	+/–	EP Group
2024	Miroslav Radačovský	5,412	0.37%	14th	0 / 15	New	–
