= Peter Kmec =

Slovak diplomat and politician

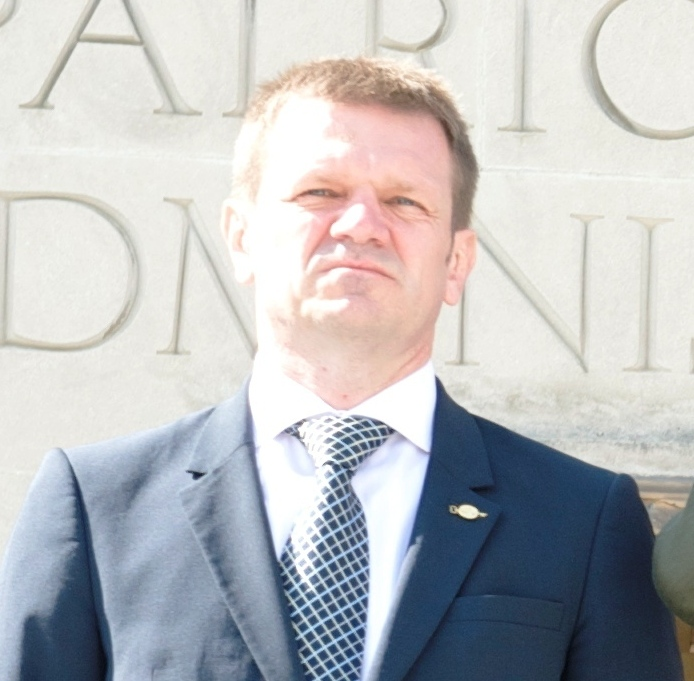
- Kmec in 2014

Deputy Prime Minister for the Recovery Plan and Knowledge Economy
- In office 25 October 2023 – 19 November 2025
- Prime Minister: Robert Fico
- Preceded by: Lívia Vašáková
- Succeeded by: Tomáš Drucker

Member of the National Council
- In office 20 March 2020 – 25 October 2023

Ambassadorial Positions
- In office 2007–2018
- 2012–2018: United States
- 2007–2012: Sweden

Personal details
- Born: 11 November 1966 (age 59) Nitra, Czechoslovakia
- Party: Voice – Social Democracy (since 2020)
- Other political affiliations: Direction – Social Democracy (until 2020)
- Education: Moscow State Institute of International Relations

Peter Kmec (born 11 November 1966) is a Slovak diplomat and politician who has served as the Deputy Prime Minister for the Recovery Plan and Knowledge Economy.

== Early life ==
Kmec was born on 11 November 1966 in Nitra. Between 1985 and 1990, he studied at the Moscow State Institute of International Relations. Kmec was the ambassador of Slovakia to Sweden from 2007 until 2012, later the United States from 2012 until 2018.

== Political career ==
In 2020, Kmec was elected as an MP of the National Council of Slovakia on the list of Direction – Social Democracy. Soon after the election, he joined the Voice – Social Democracy party, which split from Smer.

As a member of Voice, Kmec served as the main foreign policy expert, until a video was published by a Smer activist showing Kmec agreeing with government foreign policy experts in the need for pro-Western focus of Slovak politics. The video was used by Smer to accuse Voice of planning to form government with liberal parties, rather than pro-Russian Smer after the 2023 Slovak parliamentary election. As a result, Kmec lost his position as the Voice foreign policy expert. Following the election, Kmec became deputy prime minister as well as Minister of European Union Subsidies and the Recovery Plan in Fico's Fourth Cabinet.

In November 2025, Prime Minister Fico publicly announced he would submit a motion to the President of Slovakia to dismiss Kmec from his post as Deputy Prime Minister for the Recovery Plan, citing “doubts about the handling of public funds”. Shortly thereafter, Kmec submitted his resignation, stating that he was doing so to protect the reputation of his party (Voice – Social Democracy) and Slovak industry, though he denied committing any major wrongdoing. President Pellegrini accepted Kmec's resignation on 19 November. After his resignation, Kmec returned to the parliament.
