= Rudolf Huliak =

Slovak politician (born 1975)

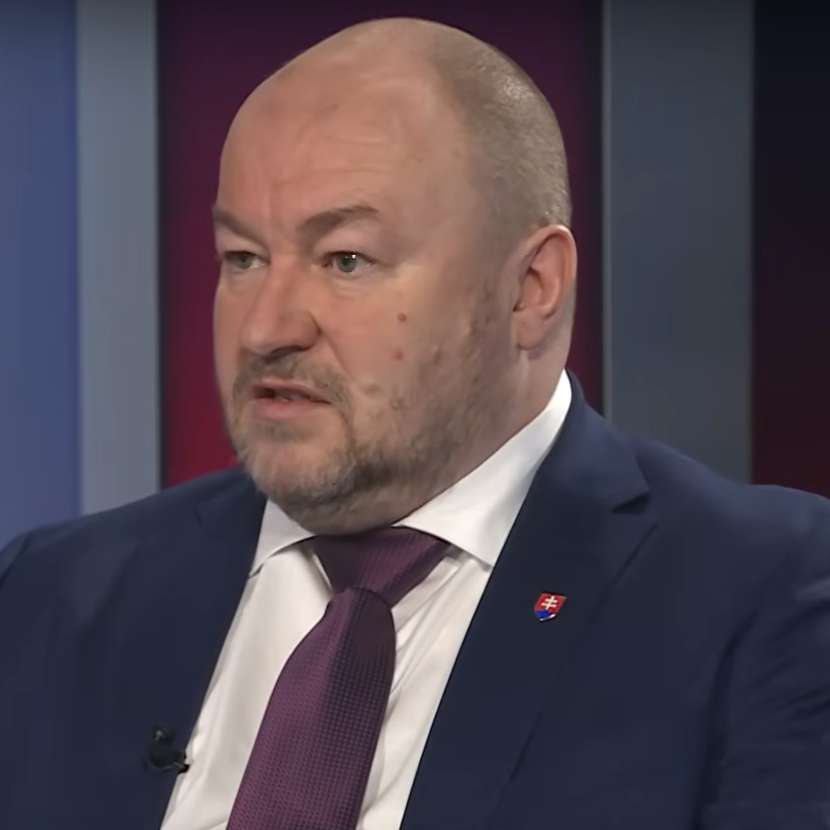
- Huliak in 2025

Minister of Tourism and Sports
- Incumbent
- Assumed office 5 March 2025
- Prime Minister: Robert Fico
- Preceded by: Dušan Keketi

Member of the National Council
- In office 25 October 2023 – 5 March 2025

Personal details
- Born: 5 May 1975 (age 51) Očová, Czechoslovakia
- Party: Rural Party (2021–present)
- Other political affiliations: Slovak Patriot (2021)

Rudolf Huliak (born 5 May 1975) is a Slovak politician serving as Minister of Tourism and Sports since 2025. From 2023 to 2025, he was a member of the National Council.

== Early life ==
Rudolf Huliak was born on 5 May 1975 in Očová. He studied economics of transportation at the University of Žilina. After graduation he started a car painting business in Očová. He has also been active as a representative of hunting organizations.

== Political career ==
In the 2020 Slovak parliamentary election, Huliak ran on the election list of the far-right People's Party Our Slovakia but failed to win a parliament seat after receiving only 899 votes. The following year, Huliak briefly joined the Slovak Patriot party but soon left and started his own party called National Coalition / Independent Candidates (later renamed to the Rural Party) and became its chair.

In 2022, Huliak was elected mayor of Očová after winning 510 votes in the regional elections. In the same elections, he ran for the post of governor of the Banská Bystrica Region and despite finishing third, his candidacy won over 23,000 votes and propelled Huliak into national politics.

In the 2023 Slovak parliamentary election, he ran at the list of the Slovak National Party, which has signed an electoral coalition treaty with his party. Huliak was elected MP with 58,875 preferential votes. Huliak's name was put forward for the position of Environment Minister. Nonetheless, the nomination was controversial as Huliak was known for being a climate change denier. Over 40,000 citizens including scientists, academics and environmental campaigners signed a petition against Huliak becoming a minister. Meanwhile, 16,000 citizens signed a counterpetition. The president Zuzana Čaputová refused to confirm Huliak's appointment, arguing the candidate is not suitable as he denies the existence of climate change.

In 2024, Huliak started a rebellion against the leadership of the Slovak National Party. Along with two fellow MPs, he started blocking government proposals in the National Council. The strength of Huliak's faction increased to four, equal to the size of the government's majority in the parliament after it was joined by the former Voice – Social Democracy MP Roman Malatinec. The crisis was resolved in March 2025 in exchange for Huliak becoming the minister of sports and tourism.

== Views ==
=== Environment ===
Huliak repeatedly denied the existence of climate change. According to Huliak, the increasing temperatures are caused by incorrect measurement. He refers to European Green Deal as an act of terrorism. He also argued that the decrease of carbon dioxide in the atmosphere might make the air "explosive and unsuitable for humans". (This is not true; the level of CO_{2} is irrelevant for fire ignition; the level of oxygen is relevant, but human activity has negligible impact on this much more common gas.) In a TV show, Huliak demonstrated the beneficent qualities of carbon dioxide by exhaling cigar smoke on a plant in a terrarium, claiming the plant good condition proves that CO_{2} is good for nature. (The CO2 fertilization effect is real, but the effects of rapid climate change are both good and bad, including the extinction of many species.) He often posts picture of animals hunted by himself, including bears, on his social media channels.

=== Foreign policy ===
Huliak is strongly pro-Russian. The National Coalition campaigned in the 2023 election for Slovakia's exit from the European Union and Nato. After the election, Huliak said the Slovak prime minister should travel to Moscow and beg Vladimir Putin to forgive Slovakia for supporting Ukraine in Russian invasion of Ukraine. In 2024, he argued Putin and Volodymyr Zelenskyy, the president of Ukraine, should end the conflict in Očová over a bowl of his goulash. One of his first meetings as the minister of sport was with the Russian ambassador. After the meeting Huliak said all restrictions for Russian athletes in international competitions should be lifted.

== Controversy ==
In 2024, Huliak referred to the Progressive Slovakia MP Lucia Plaváková as a "bitch" for supporting abortion. He later refused to apologize, claiming that he did not mean to cause offense as he has respect for female dogs and that such words were commonly used to refer to attractive females in his youth.

In a statement as Tourism and Sports Minister, Huliak argued for reintroducing conscription in Slovakia because Viktor Orbán wore a scarf depicting Greater Hungary, which included Slovakia. He stated: "The issue of revising the Trianon borders also arises. In several cities, the Hungarian state is buying up historical buildings. I hope they are aware of the security situation within Slovakia. These are all signs that we should address".
