= Rural Party (Slovakia) =

Political party in Slovakia

Rural Party Strana vidieka
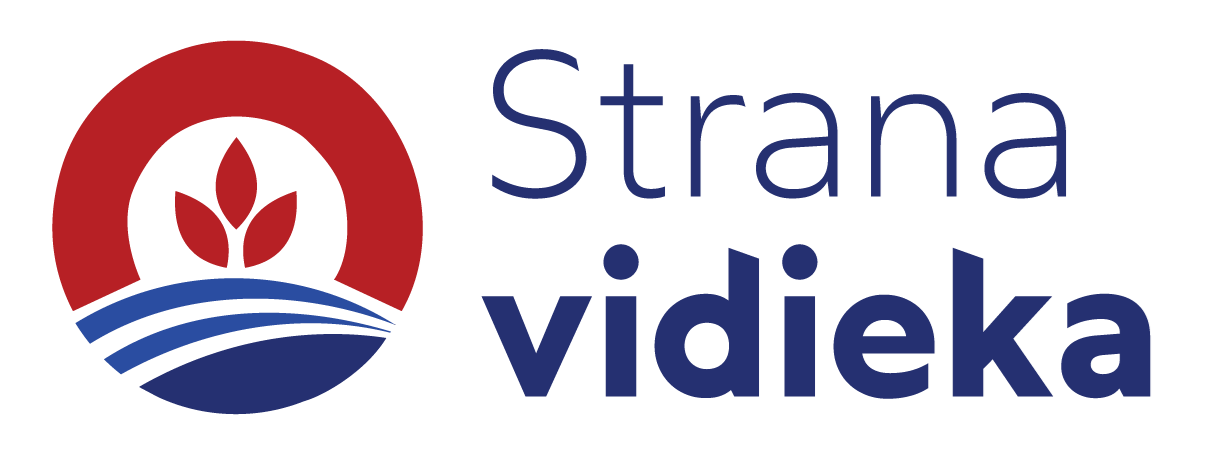
- Abbreviation: SV
- Chairman: Rudolf Huliak
- Deputy Chairleaders: Pavel Ľupták; Roman Malatinec; Ivan Ševčík
- Founder: Sergej Kozlík
- Founded: 5 March 2014 (SDS); 14 August 2015 (NK); 21 July 2022 (NK/NEKA)
- Preceded by: People's Party – Movement for a Democratic Slovakia
- Headquarters: Belanská 580, 03301 Liptovský Hrádok
- Membership (2022): ▲1,879
- Ideology: Slovak nationalism; Ultranationalism; National conservatism; Right-wing populism; Hard Euroscepticism
- Political position: Far-right
- National affiliation: Slovak National Party (2023–2024)
- European affiliation: European Democratic Party (2014–2019)
- Colours: Red; Blue
- Slogan: "We fight for you"; (Slovak: Bojujeme za vás)
- National Council: 2 / 150
- European Parliament: 0 / 15
- Regional Presidents: 0 / 8
- Regional parliaments: 1 / 408
- Mayors: 0 / 2,904
- Local councillors: 151 / 20,686

Website
- stranavidieka.sk

The Rural Party (Slovak: Strana vidieka; SV), formerly known as Party of Democratic Slovakia, (Note: Slovak: Strana demokratického Slovenska; SDS) National Coalition (Note: Slovak: Národná koalícia; NK) and National Coalition / Independent Candidates, (Note: Slovak: Národná koalícia / Nezávislí kandidáti; NK/NEKA) is a Slovak nationalist political party founded in 2014 by the former politician of the ĽS-HZDS movement Sergej Kozlík. The party profiles itself in three pillars – national, Christian and social. Since 2024, the chairman of the party has been Rudolf Huliak. Before the 2020 parliamentary election, the National Coalition joined an electoral coalition with the far-right People's Party Our Slovakia party, but did not win any mandate in the National Council.

== History ==
In the 2019 presidential election, the party expressed support for Štefan Harabin. In the 2019 European Parliament election, Štefan Harabin's nephew Slavomír Harabin ran for the National Coalition. The party received only 0.72% of the vote and did not win any seats.

In November 2019, the National Coalition became one of the small Slovak political parties that signed a memorandum on the cooperation of "pro-national and Christian forces" for the upcoming parliamentary elections with the People's Party Our Slovakia. A de jure coalition was not created, the Kotleba party only freed up a certain number of seats on their candidate list for other parties. NK received 10 places on the candidate list, with chairwoman Slavěna Vorobelová placed highest in 16th place. Thanks to receiving a higher number of preference votes, three other candidates were elected ahead of her, and she remained outside parliament, placing 19th overall after Danica Mikovčáková's mandate was given up as the first substitute. The party later left the candidate list.

== Electoral results ==
=== Parliamentary elections ===
Election	Leader	Votes	%	Seats	+/–	Government
2023	Pavel Zacharovský	166,995*	5.62* (#7)*	3 / 150	3	Government

^{*} the politicians of the National Coalition ran on the SNS candidate list, three of the elected deputies represent SV, however eventually, they paused their membership and continued as independent, meaning the party was officially represented by 0 members of the parliament.

=== European Parliament elections ===
Election	Leader	Votes	%	Seats	+/–
2014	Sergej Kozlík	8,378	1.49 (#14)	0 / 13	▼1**
2019	Slavěna Vorobelová	7,145	0.72 (#15)	0 / 14	0

^{**}compared to ĽS-HZDS
