= Dušan Keketi (politician) =

Slovak politician (born 1975)

Minister of Tourism and Sports
- In office 1 February 2024 – 5 March 2025
- Prime Minister: Robert Fico
- Preceded by: Office established
- Succeeded by: Rudolf Huliak

Personal details
- Born: 29 August 1975 (age 51) Trnava, Czechoslovakia
- Parent: Dušan Keketi (father)
- Education: University of Economics in Bratislava

Dušan Keketi (born 29 August 1975) is a Slovak manager and politician. From 2024 to 2025 he served as the first Minister of Tourism and Sport of Slovakia.

== Biography ==
Dušan Keketi was born on 29 August 1975 in Trnava. His father is the association football functionary and former goalkeeper Dušan Keketi. Keketi studied marketing at the University of Economics in Bratislava, graduating in 1998.

Following graduation, Keketi pursued a career in business. From 2016 to 2018 he was the chairman of the board of the state owned bank Eximbanka. From 2020 he was the head of the board of the Bratislava Airport.

Since February 2024 he was put in charge of the newly created Ministry of Tourism and Sport.
