= Voice – Social Democracy =

Slovak political party

Voice – Social Democracy Hlas – sociálna demokracia
- Chairman: Matúš Šutaj Eštok
- Vice-Chairpersons: See list: Tomáš Drucker; Richard Raši; Denisa Saková; Erik Tomáš
- General Manager: Igor Tkačivský
- Honorary Chairman: Peter Pellegrini
- Founder: Peter Pellegrini
- Founded: 29 June 2020; 6 years ago
- Registered: 11 September 2020; 5 years ago
- Split from: Direction – Social Democracy (Smer)
- Headquarters: Lazaretská 2400/15, Bratislava
- Think tank: Institute of Social Democracy
- Membership (2022): ▲2,711
- Ideology: Social democracy; Left-wing populism; Left-wing nationalism
- Political position: Centre-left to left-wing
- European affiliation: Party of European Socialists (associate; suspended)
- European Parliament group: Non-Inscrits
- Colors: Red; Red-violet; Blue
- Slogan: Only a strong state will help people (2023)
- Anthem: "Modlitba za Slovensko" ('Prayer for Slovakia')
- National Council: 26 / 150
- European Parliament: 1 / 15
- Regional governors: 1 / 8
- Regional deputies (Note: Also with coalitions.): 60 / 419
- Mayors (Note: Also with coalitions.): 649 / 2,904
- Local councillors (Note: Also with coalitions.): 2,700 / 20,462

Website
- strana-hlas.sk

Voice – Social Democracy (Slovak: Hlas – sociálna demokracia), also commonly referred to as Hlas, is a social democratic and populist political party in Slovakia. It was founded in 2020 by dissidents from Direction – Social Democracy (Smer-SD) led by former prime minister Peter Pellegrini. In October 2022, it was admitted as an associate member of the Party of European Socialists (PES), although its membership was later suspended in October 2023.

Several members of the party's presidium, including its founder Peter Pellegrini, are associated with bribery and abuse of power in the testimonies of cooperating defendants. In December 2020, the National Crime Agency charged Peter Žiga, a member of the party's presidium, with bribery.

== History ==
Party leader Peter Pellegrini joined Direction – Social Democracy (Smer–SD) in 2000. After being elected to the National Council in the 2006 parliamentary election, Pellegrini served in several positions as state secretary, minister and speaker of the National Council. He was elected vice-chairman of Smer–SD in 2014. Pellegrini succeeded Robert Fico as prime minister after the 2018 government crisis triggered by the murder of investigative journalist Ján Kuciak. Fico remained the party chairman.

Pellegrini led Smer–SD electoral list in the 2020 Slovak parliamentary election, while still serving as party vice-chairman. After winning 170,000 more personal votes than Fico, Pellegrini called for a party convention and expressed his intention to run for party chairman.

The political party was announced on 29 June 2020 and registered by the Ministry of the Interior on 11 September 2020. The party was launched by the former prime minister Peter Pellegrini. On the day of the launch of the new party, Pellegrini left Smer–SD, along with ten more of the party's members of the National Council. It had to obtain 10,000 signatures by 25 December 2020 to be registered as a party. Pellegrini, Matúš Šutaj Eštok, and Peter Kmec formed the party's preparatory committee, and Pellegrini became the party's chairman. Until the end of the term, the 11 deputies were classified as non-inscrits within the National Council.

Immediately after the party was formed, its support was about 16%. In October 2020, the party became the most popular for the first time, and remained ahead in most opinion polls until January 2023. After Pellegrini visited Olaf Scholz in March 2023, some commentators perceived a shift in the preferred Slovak party of the Party of European Socialists (PES) from Smer–SD to Hlas–SD, due to more radical rhetoric from the former party. Both parties were suspended from PES in October 2023 after forming a coalition with the far-right Slovak National Party.

== Ideology ==
While Hlas, a splinter party formed from Direction – Social Democracy (Smer) aims to represent a more moderate Slovak social democracy, it "never embraced the environmentalist and socially progressive values characterising other rebranded social-democratic parties in Western and Eastern Europe" and instead "opted to differentiate itself from Smer mainly by providing a more institutional and technocratic leadership style, in contrast to Fico’s increasingly populist and radical approach". It has a symbiotic relationship with Smer. While Smer's radicalization on sociocultural and foreign policy issues attract right-wing voters, Hlas appeals to moderate voters who are warded off by Smer's ideological shift. Nevertheless, the party has an ideological continuity with Smer.

Smer and Hlas are considered to have "subtly different ideological programmes". Hlas puts emphasis on universal and European values, whereas Smer has a more national conservative approach, presenting itself as a specifically Slovak social democracy of a conservative and rustic character and with rejection of socially progressive values such as pro-LGBT and environmental agendas. Hlas pursues a more subtle approach, focusing on the concept of a 'strong state that helps the people'. It denounced economic liberalism, criticizing Freedom and Solidarity for wanting to limit the role of the state in society and rejecting the "13th month" pension payments. Hlas advocates generous social welfare, special programs for the poorest layers of Slovak society, and focusing on underdeveloped regions. After 2023, Hlas stated that it was abandoning its "middle position" between Smer and Progressive Slovakia, instead opting to align with Smer as a "programmatically close party". The party aligned with Smer on issues such as Slovak withdrawal from NATO.

Hlas has been described as moderate on socio-cultural issues, in contrast to the social conservatism of Smer. Hlas has avoided taking stances on issues such as vaccination, same-sex partnerships, or abortion, and instead focuses mainly on core social-democratic issues such as healthcare and the welfare state. The party also argues that "membership within the European Union and NATO is a guarantee of prosperity and safety". Overall, Hlas is considered "friendlier towards Euro-Atlantic institutions and less sympathetic towards Russia" than Smer.

Hlas states that it has a pro-European outlook and promotes traditional social-democratic goals within the welfare state.

In 2024, Erik Tomáš also said that the party will support intentions of Smer–SD to fight against liberalism and progressive ideologies. In 2025, party leader Matúš Šutaj Eštok stated that "people around the world are realizing that the liberal and progressive ideologies of today's politicians do not truly represent freedom and progress but rather coercion and decline," citing examples such as Donald Trump's reelection, the collapse of Trudeau cabinet, the collapse of Scholz cabinet, the French political crisis, and the electoral victory of Austria's far-right Freedom Party (FPÖ).

Hlas has been described as a catch-all party.

== Criminal charges and accusations ==
In December 2020, the National Crime Agency charged the incumbent member of the party's presidium and former Minister of Environment in Pellegrini's cabinet Peter Žiga with bribery. According to the testimony of the former Deputy Minister of Justice in Pellegrini's cabinet Monika Jankovská (pleading guilty of bribery and abuse of power), Žiga was to offer a bribe of €100,000 to the judge deciding the international dispute Gabčíkovo–Nagymaros Dams.

In August 2021, former President of the Financial Administration František Imrecze and IT entrepreneur Michal Suchoba (both pleading guilty of bribery) testified that in 2014, incumbent party leader Peter Pellegrini then serving as Deputy Minister of Finance had asked for and subsequently received a bribe of €150,000 for political support for the adoption of a virtual treasury. As of January 2023, the National Crime Agency has not filed charges in this case. In 2018, Pellegrini had a property case, having bought a luxury apartment in Bratislava for €410,000. According to his property declaration, Pellegrini was to cover €246,000 from his own income and borrow the remainder, despite reports suggesting that since 2006 he has earned a total of €460,000 from public office.

In April 2022, as a part of the testimony of former President of the Financial Administration František Imrecze about an alleged criminal organization led by former prime minister of Slovakia and incumbent leader of Direction – Slovak Social Democracy Robert Fico, the current party deputy chairman Erik Tomáš was to illegally obtain compromising materials on their political rival and then opposition leader Igor Matovič by abusing state bodies. The National Crime Agency has not filed charges in this case because it is barred by the statute of limitations.

== Election results ==
=== National Council ===
Election	Leader	Votes	%	Rank	Seats	+/–	Status
2023	Peter Pellegrini	436,415	14.7	3rd	27 / 150		Smer–Hlas–SNS

=== European Parliament ===
Election	List leader	Votes	%	Rank	Seats	+/–	EP Group
2024	Branislav Becík	106,076	7.2	4th	1 / 15		NI

=== Presidential ===
Election	Candidate	First round			Second round		
Election	Candidate	Votes	%	Rank	Votes	%	Rank
2024	Peter Pellegrini	834,718	37.0	2nd	1,409,255	53.1	1st

== Party chairmen ==
Leader		Year
1	Peter Pellegrini	2020–2024
2	Matúš Šutaj Eštok	2024–present
