= Slovakization =

Process of cultural assimilation

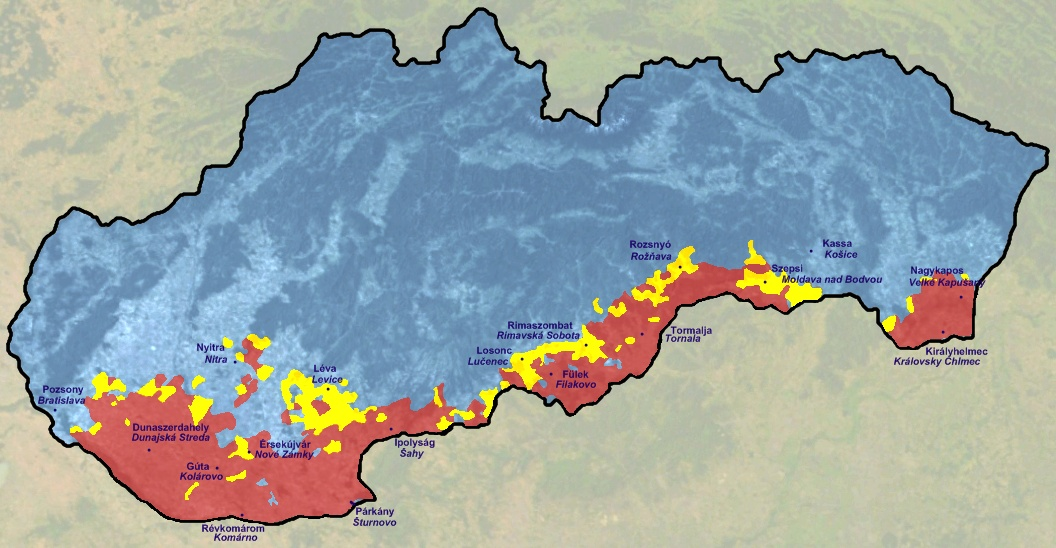
Approximate area in Slovakia inhabited by ethnic Hungarians. Hungarians are the largest ethnic minority of Slovakia, numbering 456,154 people or 7.75% of population (2021 census). 50–100% 10–50% 0–10%

Slovakization or Slovakisation (Slovak: Slovakizácia, Hungarian: Szlovákosítás) is a form of either forced or voluntary cultural assimilation and acculturation, during which non-Slovak nationals give up their culture and language in favor of the Slovak one. This process has relied most heavily on intimidation and harassment by state authorities. Another method of Slovakization was artificial resettlement. In the past the process has been greatly aided by deprivation of collective rights for minorities and ethnic cleansing, but in the last decades its promotion has been limited to the adoption of anti-minority policies and anti-minority hate speech.

The process itself is limited mostly to Slovakia, where Slovaks constitute the absolute majority by means of population and legislation power as well. Slovakization is most often used in relation to Hungarians, who constitute the most prominent minority of Slovakia, but it also affects Germans, Poles, Ukrainians, Rusyns (Ruthenians), and Jews, and Romani.

Robert Fico's governance often violates minority rights and is openly hungarophobic for its disrespect of the Hungarian minority, and Fico himself in 1998 lobbied for the Party of Hungarian Coalition to not be let into the Slovak parliament, and stated that the Beneš decrees (promoted the violation of human rights and racial discrimination of Hungarian and German population) was unchangeable.

== Hungarians ==
=== After World War I ===
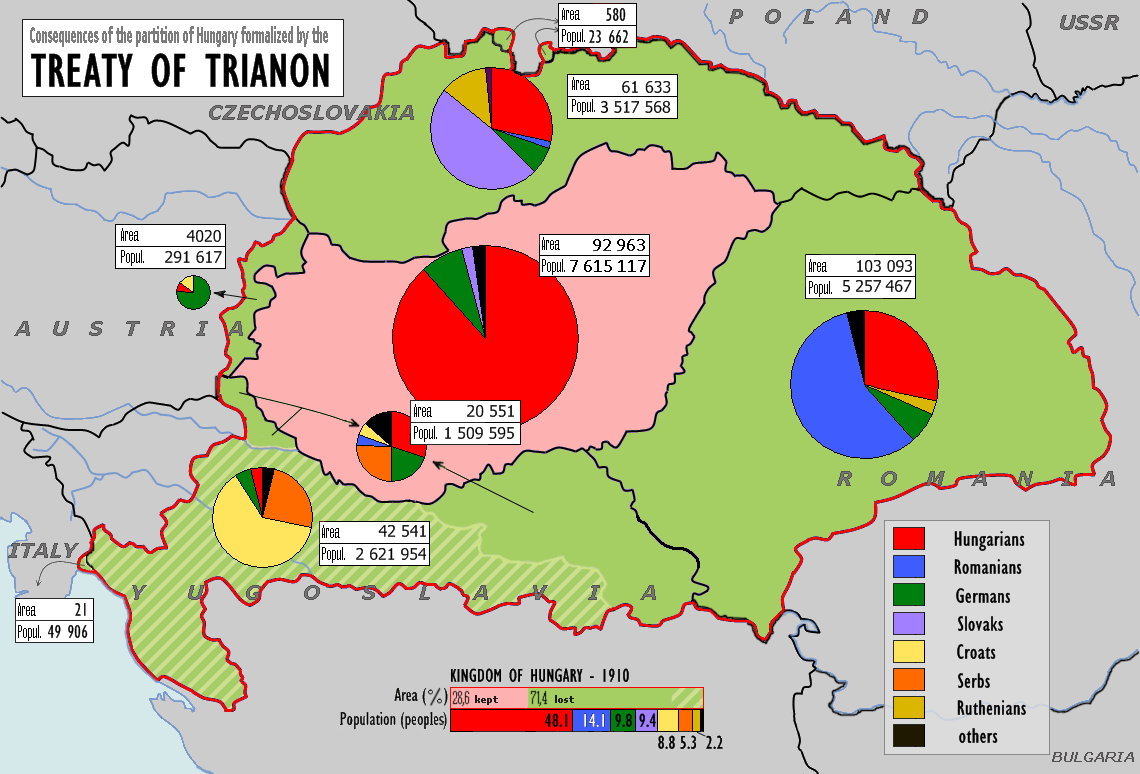
Map showing the border changes after the Treaty of Trianon. As a result, Hungary lost over two-thirds of its territory, about two-thirds of its inhabitants under the treaty and 3.3 million out of 10 million ethnic Hungarians. (Based on the 1910 census.)

The process of slovakization was present in the Kingdom of Hungary presumably ever since the appearance of the Slovak nation itself, but up until the foundation of Czechoslovakia the process was entirely voluntary. This early form of slovakization can be observed in detail in noble families' personal correspondence. Another example of pre-World War I Slovakization is the assimilation of the Habans, a Hutterite group settled in the Nagylévárd (today's Veľké Leváre) area in the 16th century, into the Slovak majority.

The accelerated, forced nature of slovakization began with the defeat of the remaining Hungarian armies in 1919, which laid foundations to the creation of Czechoslovakia, a state in which the Slovaks had gained a de facto political power for the first time in the nation's history. The Paris Peace Conference concluded by the Treaty of Trianon in 1920 set the southern border of Czechoslovakia for strategic and economic reasons much further south than the Slovak-Hungarian language border. Consequently, fully Hungarian-populated areas were annexed to the newly created state. The ethnic border has been sliding downward since the second part of the 19th century, with the beginning of the Slovak nationalist aspirations, and many almost exclusively Hungarian settlements, such as Pusztafödémes (now: Pusté Úľany) became completely Slovakised by the end of the 1910s.

Czechoslovakia provided a large education network for the Hungarian minority. Hungarians, for example, had 31 kindergartens, 806 elementary schools, 46 secondary schools, 576 Hungarian libraries at schools in the 1930s and a Department of Hungarian literature was created at the Charles University of Prague. The number of Hungarian elementary schools increased from 720 in 1923/1924 to the above number 806. The Hungarian University in Bratislava/Pozsony was immediately closed after formation of Czechoslovakia

According to the 1910 census conducted by the Central Statistical Office of Hungary, there were 884,309 people with Hungarian as a mother tongue, constituting 30.2% of the population, in what is now Slovakia compared to the 9.7% number recorded in the 2001 census, amounting to a 3-fold decrease in the percentage of Hungarians. The first Slovak census in 1919 in what is now Slovakia recorded 689,565 Hungarians constituting 23.59% of the population. According to the first Czechoslovak census in 1921 there were 650,597 Hungarians in Slovakia, constituting 21.68% of the population. The Czechoslovak census of 1930 recorded 571,952 Hungarians. All censuses from the period are disputed, and some give conflicting data for example in Kosice according to the Czechoslovak censuses 15–20% of the population was Hungarian. However, during the parliamentary elections the Ethnic Hungarian parties got 35–45% of the total votes (excluding those Hungarians who voted for the Communists or the Social democrats). The whole matter is complicated by the fact that there was a high percentage of bilingual and similarly "Slovak-Hungarian" persons who could claim being both Slovak and Hungarian.

Slovak sources usually do not deny that many Hungarian teachers (replaced in Slovak schools by Slovak and Czech teachers), railwaymen (on strike against new Czechoslovak republic in February 1919), postmen, policemen, soldiers and civil clerks (replaced by Czech and Slovak soldiers, policemen and clerks) were forced to leave or left for Hungary voluntarily, the numbers however are unclear but census do show a rapid decline in the number of people with Hungarian as a mother tongue. Some teachers and civil servants were expelled from Czechoslovakia while some left due to the harsh circumstances. There are many examples of Hungarians who were forced to leave their homes from this territory (two famous ones are the families of Béla Hamvas, and of Albert Szent-Györgyi). The high number of refugees (and even more from Romania) necessitated entire new housing projects in Budapest (Mária-Valéria telep, Pongrácz-telep), which gave shelter to refugees numbering at least in the ten-thousands.

Demographic change was also significant. Since the Middle Ages, Pusztaföldes, for example, had been almost exclusively Hungarian, but the Slovak expansion slowly replaced the aging population and out-numbering them.

==== De-Magyarization ====
Linguistic map of Czechoslovakia (1930)

Under the Austro-Hungarian Empire there was strong anti-Hungarian sentiment among certain sections of the Czech and Slovak population and this persisted to some extent in Czechoslovakia once it was formed. It seemed to hit the city of Pressburg (soon to be renamed Bratislava) most intensely. One of the first measures brought by Samuel Zoch, the newly appointed župan of the city was the forced disbandment of the only Hungarian university in Czechoslovakia (Elisabeth Science University), and the intimidation of its professors by the police in 1919, immediately after the formation of the new country. Most of the professors and former students then left Pressburg for Budapest (with the university later being re-established in Pécs). Zoch had previously stated "...but the question of minorities will be fully solved only after our public perception of morality will condemn ethnic oppression just as much as the oppression of religion".

According to Varsik, the university was not closed by the župan because local politicians did not have such powers. Elisabeth University was founded in 1912 and began teaching only in 1914. The university was not the only Hungarian graduate school in the territory of contemporary Slovakia, but it had to serve to also all students from Upper Hungary inhabited by Slovak majority. However, in compliance with the education policy of the Hungarian government, which did not allow Slovak high schools, the university did not even have a Slovak language department. In 1919, a new Czechoslovak university was founded in parallel and adopted space and limited inventory of unfinished faculty of medicine. Hungarian professors refused to promise loyalty to the new state, as was necessary for teachers and state employees, and were retired after being provided financial compensation. Thereafter, the university was closed by official government decree and replaced by Comenius University which remained the only university in mid-war Slovakia for the majority population.

On 3 February 1919, the day before the moving of Vavro Šrobár's government to Bratislava, a strike began which affected key infrastructure and sectors of industry. The strike had initially social character. Thereafter, it was politicized and joined with national demands of Hungarian and German workers. On 12 February 1919, Hungarian nationalistic circles exploited a demonstration organized by the Council of Workers. The demonstration went out of control and after a physical attack on the Italian commander Riccardo Barreca, a military patrol dispersed the crowd by shooting, leaving 7 dead and 23 wounded.

Another aspect of the anti-Hungarian sentiment was the hatred of all the statues and monuments representing Austria-Hungary or Hungarian historical people. National socialist MPs of the Czechoslovak National Assembly called for the conservation of such works of art, moving and preserving them in suitable places as early as 1920. The hatred however was not limited to sculptures only: Hungarian books were burned in Poprad and possibly other locations as well. Concurrently some of the statues were destroyed as well: the millennium monument along with the Árpád statue in Devín was blown up using dynamite,. The statue of Maria Theresa in Bratislava was preserved until October 1921 when information about attempts to restore monarchy spread in successor states of Austro-Hungarian Empire. In the atmosphere of partial mobilization, martial law and fresh memories to invasion by Béla Kun's army, it was brought down using ropes tied to trucks. In Slovakia, memorials were destroyed mainly after intervention of Red Guards of Béla Kun in spring and summer 1919, when statues of Lajos Kossuth were destroyed in Rožňava, Lučenec, Dobšiná and Nové Zámky, as well as a statue of Ferenc Rákóczi in Brezno and numerous others. In almost all of these cases the perpetrators were soldiers of the Czechoslovak legion. The idleness of state authorities encouraged destroyers of statues. The government started to act only when the mob had begun to take over shops and properties of German entrepreneurs. Thereafter, Czechoslovak army and police intervened and destruction of symbols of monarchy stopped for nearly a year.

In the revolutionary period between the creation of Czechoslovakia and the first free parliamentary elections in 1920, legislative power was held by temporary, the revolutionary (un-elected) Czechoslovak National Council (later The Czechoslovak National Assembly). The revolutionary parliament without participation of minorities also adopted a new constitution. The constitution guaranteed equal rights for all citizens regardless of gender, nationality or religion. In comparison with the previous state in the Kingdom of Hungary it also extended political rights to individuals of Hungarian nationality, by introducing universal suffrage, removing voting criteria based on wealth and education (typical for previous Hungarian elections) and granted full women's suffrage (including for Hungarian women).

Later on, all minorities gained the right to use their languages in municipalities where they constituted at least 20% of the population even in communication with government offices and courts.

According to Béla Angyal, due to gerrymandering and disproportionate distribution of population between Bohemia and Slovakia the Hungarians had little representation in the National Assembly and thus their influence on the politics of Czechoslovakia remained limited. The same considerations limited the Slovak intelligentsia's political power as well. On the other hand, Hungarians founded numerous parties including pro-Czechoslovak parties, founded parties with agrarian, social-democratic, Christian-socialist and other orientations, were active as sections of statewide Czechoslovak parties, had opportunities to participate in government and in the 1920s Hungarian members of parliament participated in adoption of several important laws with statewide impact.

=== The aftermath of World War II ===
==== "Re-Slovakization" ====
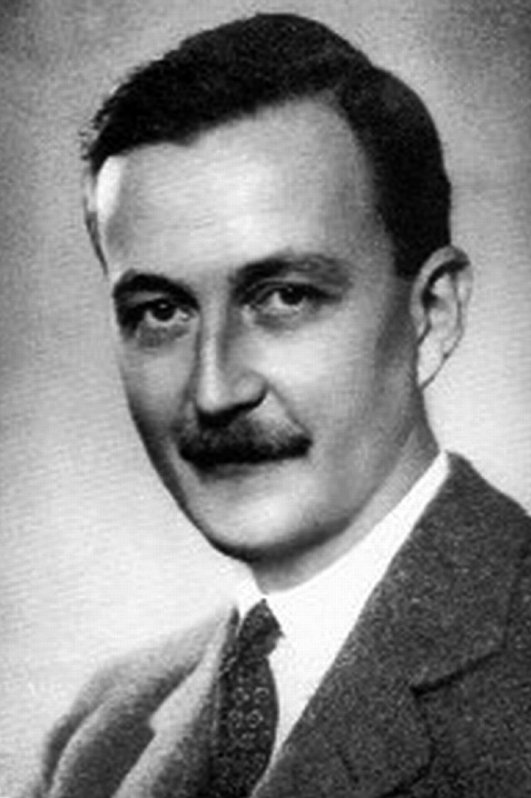
János Esterházy, controversial leader of Hungarian minority in mid-war Czechoslovakia

After World War II, the size of Hungarian population was decreased by Czechoslovak-Hungarian population exchange and expulsion of Hungarians who came to after the First Vienna Award or committed crimes according to Decree of Slovak National Council No. 33/1945 Zb. about people tribunals. Due to the proclamation of the "Košice Government Program", the German and Hungarian population living in the reborn Czechoslovakia were subjected to various forms of persecution, including: expulsions, deportations, internments, peoples court procedures, citizenship revocations, property confiscation, condemnation to forced labour camps, and forced changes of ethnicity referred to as "reslovakization."

"...in Slovakia, the party is breaking into factions. One of the factions is headed by the Representative of the Soviet of Plenipotentiaries, G. Husák. This faction includes Clementis, Novomeský and in general the Slovak intelligentsia and students. It displays a sharply nationalistic, anti-Semitic, anti-Hungarian character. ... Anti-Semitism generally is widespread in the party"

— A letter from Mátyás Rákosi to Joseph Stalin, dated 25, September 1948.

In 1946 the process of "Reslovakization" (or re-Slovakization), the forced acceptance of Slovak ethnicity, was engaged by the Czechoslovak government with the objective of eliminating the Hungarian ethnicity. The Slovak Commissioner of the Interior on June 17, 1946 (decree No.20,000/1946) initiated the "Reslovakization" program. This process based upon the Czechoslovak assumption that in fact there never had been any Hungarians in South Slovakia, only "Hungarianized Slovaks" who lost their Slovak national identity through the centuries of Hungarian rule. As Anton Granatier, officer of the Resettlement Bureau said: „We want to be the national state of Slovaks and Czechs, and we will be. This monumental programme includes re−slovakization, already under way in whole Slovakia! Within the scope of this action everyone who feels to be Slovak by origin will have the chance to declare it freely whether they want to become Slovaks with all its consequences or want to share the fate of those without citizenship.“ In the spring and summer of 1945, a series of decrees stripped Hungarians of property, from all civil rights and from their citizenship. Hungary itself gave the Slovaks equal rights and demanded the same solution to the issue from Czechoslovakia. Since Hungarians in Slovakia were deprived of many rights, and were the target of discrimination, they were pressured into having their ethnicity officially changed to Slovak, otherwise they dropped out of the pension, social, and healthcare system. 400,000 (sources differ) stateless Hungarians applied for, and eventually 344,609 Hungarians received a re-Slovakization certificate by the Central Committee for Reslovakization, and thereby Czechoslovak citizenship. Therefore, the number of Hungarians in Slovakia dropped to 350,000. According to Soviet archives, 20,000 Hungarians declared themselves as Slovak at the beginning of the year 1949, and eventually 360,000 Hungarians changed their ethnicity to Slovak, according to Slovak historians. The fear was so big among the Hungarian population, that only 350,000–367,000 claimed themselves Hungarian in the 1950 census, and only after ten years -when the reslovakization program was revoked- began to rose and reached 518,000.

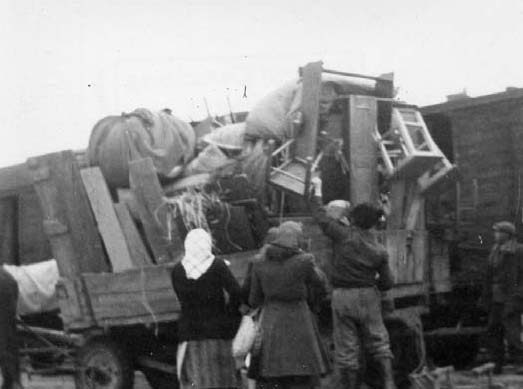
Deported Hungarians of Gúta (Kolárovo) in Mladá Boleslav, Czechoslovakia, February, 1947 (photo: Dr. Károly Ravasz)

The official results of re-slovakization action were summarized in the final report of the Re-slovakization Commission. The commission received 197,916 application forms related to 449,914 people. 83,739 applicants declared Slovak nationality also before 1930 and they were not considered to be re-slovakizants. From the remaining 366,175 candidates, the commission accepted 284,814 and refused 81,361 candidates for various reasons.

An important issue with the slovakization procedure was, that the "reslovakized" Hungarians did not take the forcible change of ethnicity seriously, because it is impossible to force someone to forget his culture and language suddenly. A Slovak journalist wrote the following about the "reslovakized" city of Nové Zámky (Hungarian: Érsekújvár):

„80% of the Hungarian population of Nové Zamky re-Slovakized . . . On the other hand, the fact remains that one can barely hear Slovak spoken in Nové Zámky. You will never find these 80% Slovaks. Only a few government employees speak Slovak here and there. What happened to the re-Slovakized persons?"

— J. Miklo; Nás Národ (1947)

==== After October 1948 ====
With the disappearance of Edvard Beneš from the political scene, the Czechoslovak government issued decree No. 76/1948 on April 13, 1948, allowing those Hungarians still living in Czechoslovakia, to reinstate Czechoslovak citizenship. A year later, Hungarians were allowed to send their children to Hungarian schools, which had been reopened for the first time since 1945, although Hungarians remaining in Slovakia were subjected to extremely heavy pressure to assimilate, and complaints reached Moscow about forced enrollment of Hungarian children in Slovak schools.

Most Slovakized Hungarians gradually readopted their Hungarian ethnicity. As a result, "The Re-Slovakization Commission" ceased operations in December 1948.

Despite their promises to settle the issue of the Hungarians in Slovakia, in 1948 Czech and Slovak ruling circles still maintained the hope that they could deport the Hungarians from Slovakia. According to a 1948 poll conducted among the Slovak population 55% were for "resettlement" (deportation) of the Hungarians, 24% said "don't know", 21% were against. Under slogans for the struggle with class enemies, the process of dispersing dense Hungarian settlements continued in 1948 and 1949. By October 1949 preparations were made to deport 600 Hungarian families.

Finally, on 25 July 1949, Czechoslovak and Hungarian delegations met in Štrbské pleso and signed so-called Štrba protocol (Slovak: Štrbský protokol) which ended the law disputes between Hungarian and Czechoslovak property and legal question and compensation of deported Hungarians.

==== The current Slovak-Hungarian political standpoint on the expulsions ====
In 2002 before Slovakia and Hungary joined the European Union in 2004, Hungarian politician Viktor Orbán demanded the repeal of the Beneš decrees, but the European Parliament asserted that "the decrees did not constitute an insurmountable obstacle to accession." Slovak politician Monika Beňová-Flašiková accused the Hungarian politicians for pushing "revanchist" policies which could destabilize Europe. Later on the Hungarian members of the Slovak parliament requested for compensation and for a symbolic apology to the victims of the expulsions. As an answer, the Slovak government adopted a resolution in September 2007 which declared that the Beneš decrees are inalterable.

=== During Socialism ===
Czechoslovakia (being a Socialist country at that time) financed the following purely Hungarian institutions for the Hungarians in Czechoslovakia as of early 1989: 386 kindergartens, 131 elementary schools, 98 secondary schools, 2 theaters, 1 special Hungarian language publishing house (6 publishing houses also publishing Hungarian literature) and 24 newspapers and journals. The first Hungarian-language university in Slovakia was opened only in 2004 – the Selye János University.

According to The Minorities at Risk Project:

During the socialist regime, Slovak nationalism was largely kept in check by the strongly centralist Prague regime. The 1968 switch to a federal arrangement gave greater scope to Slovak nationalism, however. New policies of assimilation included progressive Slovakization of education, elimination of Hungarian place-names from signs, bans on using Hungarian in administrative dealings and in institutions and workplaces, and pressure to Slovakize Hungarian names. Nonetheless, the most significant exclusionary factor in Hungarians’ social situation under the socialist regime was most likely their own refusal to integrate into the Czechoslovak system and to learn the language. Without a fluency in the official language, their economic and political opportunities were severely limited.

=== Since the independence of Slovakia ===
==== Hungarian minority parties ====
The Party of the Hungarian Coalition (SMK) and Most–Híd are the major Hungarian minority parties in Slovak politics. Since 1993 a Hungarian minority party has always been a member of the parliament. As of 2012, a Hungarian minority party spent 10 out of 19 years in government.

These parties are fighting for minority rights in Slovakia, such as the right to dual citizenship, which is granted by Hungary but not by the Slovak state, who have passed a law expecting others states to let Slovaks living abroad to retain their Slovak citizenship.

==== Mečiar Government ====
Under Communism, the Hungarian minority issue was confined invariably to the position of Slovaks within the Czechoslovak state, and therefore it was ignored in any systematic way. But the fall of Communism reinforced national identities and demolished the ideology of 'the socialist unity of nations'. The break-up of Czechoslovakia was a process of national redefinition and assertion in Slovakia.

"The oppression of the Hungarian minority in Slovakia gained momentum with the formation of the Slovak state in 1993, increasing even more sharply since Vladimír Mečiar came to power for the third time in December of 1994."

— Miklós Duray, politician Party of the Hungarian Coalition

Under the premiership of Mečiar prone to populism, exclusivist Slovak nationalism, and the use of extralegal measures, independent Slovakia approached authoritarianism. Mečiar turned the Hungarian minority into a scapegoat for Slovakia's bad economic situation. Numerous articles and books containing anti-Hungarian propaganda appeared, and the Hungarians were accused for the destruction of the 'first Slovak state', and for the ‘one-millennium-long oppression’ of Slovak nation.

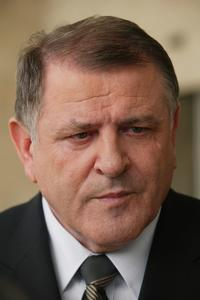
Vladimír Mečiar (1942–)

During the redrawing of the administrative boundaries of Slovakia, Hungarian politicians suggested two models; the so-called 'Komárno proposals'. The first proposal was a full ethnic autonomy of the southern Slovak districts with Hungarian majority, while the second suggestion was to create three counties in southern Slovakia to bring together the main centers of Hungarian population. Although a territorial unit of this name existed before 1918, the borders proposed by SMK were significantly different. The proposed region would have encompassed a very long slice of southern Slovakia, with the explicit aim to create an administrative unit with ethnic-Hungarian majority. Hungarian minority politicians and intellectuals thought that such kind of administrative unit is essential for the long-term survival of the Hungarian minority. Both proposals were rejected by the Slovak government in favour of an eight county model of north-south (and not east-west) governance, which has been seen to weaken the electoral power of Hungarians. According to Miklós Duray, a politician of the Party of the Hungarian Coalition: "Administrative jurisdictions of Slovakia were geographically modified in a clear case of gerrymandering. The administrative system governed by laws created in 1991, (Note: Law pertaining to Local Administration. Collection of Laws of 1990, number 472. Law pertaining to the territorial and administrative jurisdictions. Collection of Laws of 1990, number 517.) included 17 primary jurisdictions and 2 secondary jurisdictions, with a majority Hungarian population. The 1996 law (Note: Law pertaining to the territorial and administrative reorganization of the Slovak Republic. Collection of Laws of 1996, number 221.) eliminated this system of administration. In the reorganized system only 2 primary administrative jurisdictions have a Hungarian majority population (Dunajská Streda and Komárno). Furthermore, 8 secondary administrative jurisdictions were created, 5 with Hungarian populations in the 10 to 30 per cent range. In 1998, these jurisdictions had regional self governing communities, where the diminished proportion of Hungarians made certain they played a subordinate role in self government." After the regions became autonomous in 2002, SMK was able to take power in the Nitra Region and it became part of the ruling coalition in several other regions.

Before the Slovak independence two main issues appeared regarding language: the right to use non-Slovakized versions of women's names and the use of bilingual street signs. Non Slovaks were forced to Slovakize female personal names in official documents by attaching the Slovak feminine suffix '-ová'. Members of ethnic minorities were restricted in their choice of given names, as registry offices accepted only names from a limited list only. After ten years wrangling, the second Dzurinda cabinet eased these restrictions.

==== The use of the Hungarian language ====
The Slovak Constitution from 1992 asserts that the ‘state language’ on the territory of the Slovak Republic is Slovak. At the same time this constitution entails explicit provisions for minorities, including language right. These provisions were reinforced in 2001. International treaties like the Framework Convention for the Protection of National Minorities (ratified by Slovakia in 1995) or the European Charter for Regional or Minority Languages (ratified by Slovakia in 2001) and the 1995 Treaty on Good Neighbourly Relations and Friendly Cooperations between Slovakia and Hungary protect the language rights of minorities. Article 34. of the 1992 constitution asserts that "citizens of ethnic minorities have the right to be educated in their language, the right to use it in dealings with authorities, and the right to participate in the solution of affairs concerning national minorities and ethnic groups". These provisions afford a high standard of protection, but still, these legislative instruments do not warrant the implementation of the postulated rights. In most cases the disfrancishement evolves when there is insufficient political will to legislate the provisions as laws. This happened between 1992 and 1998 (i.e. under Mečiar's government). Slovak nationalist demands for a language law detaining the use of Hungarian in public institutions already appeared in 1990. Finally, the Meciar government pushed through legislation restricting the use of minority languages in public institutions. In 1995, the Slovak Parliament passed Act No 270 on the State Language of Slovakia, which came into power on 1 January 1996. This act revoked the more tolerant Act No 428 passed in 1990. The 1995 act emphasized the significance of the Slovak language for Slovak nationalism and statehood, by consolidating the exclusivist monolingualism. The new act considerably limited the use of minority languages, that is, of Hungarian, which had featured on bilingual signposts with placenames in predominantly Hungarian areas, and in bilingual school certificates issued to students in Hungarian minority schools. According to Duray: "An official language law (Note: Language Law of the Slovak Republic. Collection of Laws of 1996, number 270.) was promulgated providing the legal framework for the official use of the Slovak language not only in official communications but also in everyday commerce, in the administration of religious bodies, and even in the realm of what is normally considered private interaction, for example, communications between patient and physician." In 1999, the Dzurinda government passed Act No 184 on the Use of the Languages of the Minority Communities, which reintroduced the institution of bilingual school certificates and provided that in communes with more than 20 percent of inhabitants belonging to a given minority, the minority language can be used in administration, and signposts with placenames can be bilingual. Furthermore, Article 10, prohibiting doing business and drafting contracts in any other language but Slovak, was abolished from the Act. However the act limits itself to only official contacts with the state and thus fails to overcome the 1996 act ensuring the use of Slovak in culture, schools and media. Language rights in education have also been a sphere of antagonism between the Slovak state and the Hungarian minority. Bilingual education in primary and secondary schools is currently permitted. However, the array of subjects that should be taught in each language remained a highly contested issue. Government proposals prior to the 1998 elections (i.e. under Mečiar's government) even suggested that certain subjects should be taught only by teachers of 'Slovak origin' to ensure that the Slovak population living in areas with significant Hungarian populations should be able to assimilate themselves into mainstream Slovak life. According to Duray: "On March 12, 1997 (i.e. under Mečiar's government), the Undersecretary of Education sent a circular to the heads of the school districts making known the following regulations: In Hungarian schools the Slovak language should be taught exclusively by native speakers. The same exclusion criteria applies to non-Slovak schools in the teaching of geography and history. (The Undersecretary modified the language of this regulation later by changing the term "exclusively" for "mainly".) In communities where the Hungarian community exceeds 40% of the total population the teachers of Slovak schools receive supplementary pay. In all communities which include a Hungarians population and where there is no school or there is no Slovak school, wherever possible a Slovak school should be opened, but not a Hungarian one." (Note: The circular issued by Undersecretary Ondrej Nemcok cites governmental decrees of the Slovak Republic, numbers 459/95, 768/95 and 845/95.) At the end of the 1998 school year a large number of Hungarian pupils handed back their school report that were issued only in Slovak.

In 2003, there were 295 Hungarian elementary schools and 75 secondary schools in Slovakia. In most of them Hungarian was used as the medium of instruction, excluding 35 elementary schools and 18 secondary schools, which were bilingual.

After the parliamentary elections in 2006, the nationalist Slovak National Party (SNS) of Ján Slota became a member of the ruling coalition led by Robert Fico. In August a few incidents motivated by ethnic hatred caused diplomatic tensions between the countries. Mainstream Hungarian and Slovak media blamed Slota's anti-Hungarian statements from the early summer for worsening ethnic relations. (Further informations: 2006 Slovak-Hungarian diplomatic affairs, and Hedvig Malina).

On 27 September 2007 the Beneš decrees were reconfirmed by the Slovak parliament which legitimized the Hungarians and Germans calumniation and deportation from Czechoslovakia after World War II.

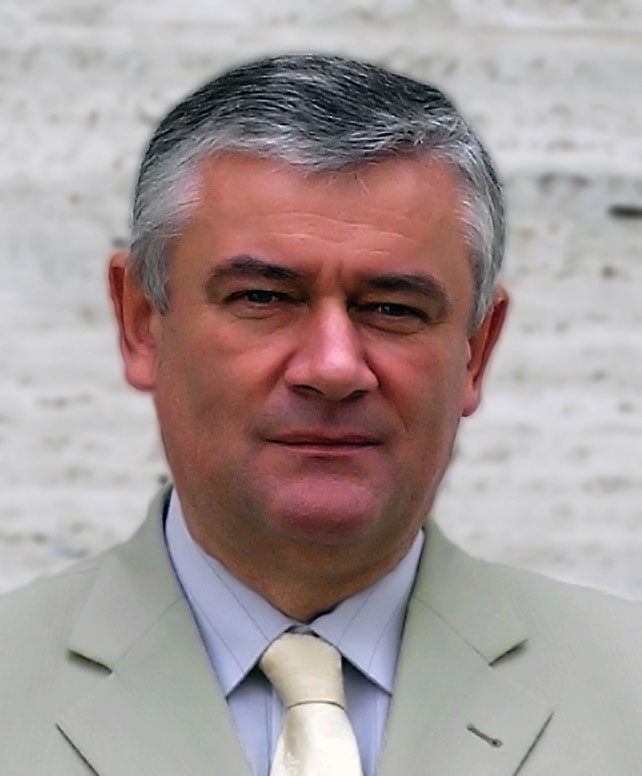
Ján Slota, the chairman of Slovak Party SNS, according to whom the Hungarian population of Slovakia "is a tumour in the body of the Slovak nation."

In 2008, Ján Mikolaj (SNS), minister of education propagated changes in the Hungarian schools of Slovakia. According to a new education law plan, the Hungarian language which was educated as mother tongue until now will be considered a foreign language – and taught in a smaller proportion of lessons. The only textbooks allowed to be used in Hungarian schools will be those translated from Slovak books and approved by Slovak administration.
In October 2008 Hungarian parents and teachers sent back Hungarian textbooks to the Minister of Education. The books contained geographical names only in Slovak violating the basic rules of the Hungarian language and the minorities' right of usage of their native language.
In November 2008 Prime Minister Robert Fico has again promised, this time at a cabinet meeting in Komárno, southern Slovakia, that an ongoing problem with textbooks for ethnic Hungarian schools in Slovakia will be resolved. Though as of November 2008 Ján Slota still insists on the grammatically incorrect version (Slovak language names in Hungarian sentences) and having the correct Hungarian name only afterwards.

The Slovak authorities denied the registration of a Hungarian traditional folk art association, because they used the Hungarian word Kárpát-medence (Carpathian Basin). According to Dušan Čaplovič the word and the association is against the sovereignty of Slovakia, furthermore the word is fascist, it is familiar with the German Lebensraum, and Hungarians use it in this ideology. On September 1, 2009 more than ten thousand Hungarians held demonstrations to protest against the language law that limits the use of minority languages in Slovakia, in both countries. The law calls for fines of up to £4,380 for anyone "misusing the Slovak language.

An anti-Hungarian SNS political poster from the 2010 parliamentary election campaign. It features the flag of Slovakia using the colors of the flag of Hungary. The top text reads "So that tomorrow we wouldn't be surprised".

The particular anti-Hungarian edge of the Slovak public discourse reached its top in the 2010 parliamentary elections, when numerous parties have been campaigning with latent to openly anti-Hungarian slogans. The presently governing Smer has rented billboards that have warned that "They have given power to SMK! They will do it again!", alleging that forming a coalition with SMK would be dangerous. SNS went even further and published openly anti-Hungarian posters (see the picture on the right) asserting that Slovakia's on the brim of being conquered by Hungary due to the new Hungarian government's actions. Posters by SNS have been prominently featured in areas with predominantly Hungarian populace too.

== Rusyns ==
The ethnic relationship of Prešov Region is complex and volatile. A long-term cultural and everyday cohabitation of Rusyns, Slovaks and Hungarians, under the prepodence of the non-Rusyn element led to the linguistic Slovakization of Rusyns, while in some parts (in cities and ethnic islands in the south) they were Magyarized. Still, in both cases they preserved their religion (Greek Catholicism). Until the 1920s, the Slovak-speaking Greek-Catholics composed a transitional group that was connected with the Rusyns through religion and traditions, with Slovak as their language. Their number was gradually increasing with the transition of the parts of Rusyn population to the Slovak language. Slovakization of the Rusyn population increased in the times of the Czechoslovak authorities (since 1920). The Greek Catholics and Orthodox started to perceive themselves as Slovaks. It is difficult to estimate the distribution of the Orthodox and the Greek Catholics by the language as well as to determine the number of Rusyns because both the Hungarian and Czechoslovak censuses provided the incorrect number of Rusyns, but it contains roughly 50–100 000 people. According to censuses the decrease of the number of Rusyns was influenced not only by Slovakization but also by emigration of a significant number of Rusyns from Prešov, mainly to the Czech lands.

The Slovak pressure on Rusyns in Slovakia increased after 1919 when Czechoslovakia incorporated Transcarpathia to the east of the Uzh River. The Slovakization of Rusyns (and Ukrainians) was a part of the program of the Slovak People's Party, whose leader refused to cooperate with the Rusyn politicians of Transcarpathia but cooperated with Hungarian-speaking A. Brody. Therefore, the Rusyn politicians opened the links with the Czech political parties which were supportive of neutrality towards the Rusyn question. The cultural Slovak-Rusyn relations at the time were minimal.

== Polish Gorals ==
The early Hungarian censuses ignored the Polish nationality, all ethnic Gorals, which identified as Poles were registered as Slovaks.There was also a very strong process of Slovakization of Goral people throughout 18th–20th centuries, mostly done by Roman Catholic Church, in which institution the local aboriginal Polish priests were replaced with Slovak ones. Also, the institution of schooling was replacing the Polish language (Goral dialects) with Slovak during classes.

== See also ==
- Czechoslovak–Hungarian population exchange
- Beneš decrees
- Anti-Polish sentiment
- Hungarian minority in Slovakia
- Hungarophobia
- 2006 Slovak-Hungarian diplomatic affairs
- Hedvig Malina
- Ethnic minorities in Czechoslovakia
- Anti-German sentiment
- Slavicisation
- Magyarization
- Czechization

== Sources and general references ==
- J. Rieber, Alfred (2000). Forced Migration in Central and Eastern Europe, 1939–1950. Routledge. ISBN 978-0-7146-5132-3.
- Mandelbaum, Michael (2000). The New European Diasporas: National Minorities and Conflict in Eastern Europe. Council on Foreign Relations. ISBN 978-0-87609-257-6.
- Kaplan, Karel (1987). The short march: the Communist takeover in Czechoslovakia, 1945-1948. C.Hurst & Co.Publishers. ISBN 978-0-905838-96-0.
- Eleonore C. M. Breuning, Dr. Jill Lewis, Gareth Pritchard; Power and the people: a social history of Central European politics, 1945–56; Manchester University Press, 2005; ISBN 0-7190-7069-4, ISBN 978-0-7190-7069-3
- Kamusella, Tomasz (2009). The Politics of Language and Nationalism in Modern Central Europe. Basingstoke, UK (Foreword by Professor Peter Burke): Palgrave Macmillan. ISBN 9780230550704.
- Bernd, Rechel (2009). Minority rights in Central and Eastern Europe. Taylor & Francis. ISBN 9780203883655.
- Mináč, Vladimír (1993). Odkial' a kam Slováci? (in Slovak). Bratislava: Remedium. ISBN 978-80-85352-15-3.
- Šutaj, Štefan (2005). Nútené presídlenie Maďarov zo Slovenska do Čiech [Deportation of population of Hungarian nationality out of Slovakia to Bohemia after the World War II] (in Slovak). Prešov: Universum. ISBN 80-89046-29-0.
- C.M. Breuning, Eleonore; Dr. Lewis, Jill; Pritchard, Gareth (2005). Power and the people: a social history of Central European politics, 1945-56. Manchester University Press. ISBN 9780719070693.
- Kertesz, Stephen (1985). The Last European Peace Conference: Paris 1946 - Conflict of Values. Lanham: University Press of America. ISBN 0-8191-4421-5.
- Ther, Philipp; Siljak, Ana (2001). Redrawing nations: ethnic cleansing in East-Central Europe, 1944-1948. Rowman & Littlefield. ISBN 9780742510944.
- Engemann, Iris (2008). The Slovakization of Bratislava 1918-1948. Processes of national appropriation in the interwar-period. CEU.
- Jablonicky, Jozef (1965). Slovensko na prelome; Zapas o vitazstvo narodnej a demokratickej revolucie na Slovensku (in Slovak). Bratislava: Vydavatel'stvo politickej literatury.
- Country Study (1987). Library of Congress Country Studies; Czechoslovakia; Minorities and Population Transfers; The War Years, 1939–45. Federal Research Division of the Library of Congress.
- Yeshayahu A., Jelinek (1983). The Lust for Power: Nationalism, Slovakia, and the Communists, 1918–1948. East European Monographs. ISBN 9780880330190.
- Bobák, Ján (1996). Mad̕arská otázka v Česko-Slovensku, 1944-1948 [Hungarian Question in Czechoslovakia] (in Slovak). Matica slovenská. ISBN 978-80-7090-354-4.
- Lastovicka, Cf. Bohuslav (1960). "Vznik a vyznam Kosickeho vladniho programu". Ceskoslovensky Casopis Historicky [Czechoslovakia Historical Magazine] (in Slovak). 8 (4): 449–471.
- Krekovič, Eduard; Mannová, Elena; Krekovičová, Eva (2005). Mýty naše slovenské [Our Slovak Myths] (in Slovak). Bratislava: AEPress. ISBN 80-88880-61-0.
- Marko, Augustín; Martinický, Pavol (1995). Slovensko-maďarské vzťahy : história a súčasnost̕ vo faktoch [Slovak-Hungarian relations : history and present day in figures] (in Slovak). Bratislava: Signum : Slovenská spoločnosť na obranu demokracie a humanity [Slovak Society for Protection of Democracy and Humanity]. ISBN 978-80-967333-2-3.
- Zvara, Juraj (1969). Madárská menšina na Slovensku po roku 1945 [Hungarian minority in Slovakia after 1945] (in Slovak). Bratislava: Epocha, t. Pravda.
- Macartney, C.A. (2001) [1st. Pub. 1937]. "Chapter 1: Introduction". Hungary and her successors – The Treaty of Trianon and Its Consequences 1919–1937. 1st. Pub. Oxford University Press 2nd. Pub. Simon Publications. ISBN 978-1-931313-86-5.
- Kovács, Éva (2004). "IV: A politikai attitűdök mint a nemzeti azonosságtudat mutatói" ( (PDF)). Felemás asszimiláció A kassai zsidóság a két világháború között (1918-1938) (PDF). Nostra tempora;, 9 (in Hungarian). Šamorín: Forum Minority Research Institute; Lilium Aurum Slovakia. ISBN 80-8062-222-1. LCCN 2005443137. Archived from the original on 24 January 2011.
- Szegő, Iván Miklós (29 September 2007). "A magyarok kitelepítése: mézesmadzag a szlovákoknak" (in Hungarian). Index.
- Yehudah, Don; Karády, Viktor (1989). A Social and Economic History of Central European Jewry. Transaction Publishers. ISBN 9780887382116.
- Magocsi, Paul R.; Pop, Ivan (2002). Encyclopedia of Rusyn History and Culture. University of Toronto Press. ISBN 9780802035660.
- Martin, Butora; Skalodny, Thomas W. (1998). Slovakia 1996-1997: A Global Report on the State and Society. Institute for Public Affairs.
- Kocsis, Károly; Kocsisné Hodosi, Eszter (1998). Ethnic Geography of the Hungarian Minorities in the Carpathian Basin. Simon Publications LLC. ISBN 9781931313759.
- Tisliar, Pavol. Prve slovenske scitanie l'udu z roku 1919 (PDF) (in Slovak). Katedra archivnctva a pomocnych vied historickych Filozoficka fakulta UK.
- Rubicon (2005). "Rubicon, történelmi folyóirat" [Rubicon Hungarian History Magazine] (in Hungarian). 6. Rubicon-Ház Bt.
- Cienski, Jan (16 August 2009). "Slovakia and Hungary just won't get along". GlobalPost.
- Ward, Josh (25 August 2009). "Slovakia and Hungary 'Dangerously Close to Playing with Fire'". Spiegel. SpiegelOnline International.
- Bumm.sk (5 March 2008). "Sínen a školský zákon. Duray: ravasz módszerekkel próbálkoznak". Bumm (in Hungarian). www.bumm.sk.
- Felvidék Ma (21 November 2008). "Slota: Meghátráltunk, kétnyelvűek lesznek a településnevek". Felvidék Ma (in Hungarian). www.felvidek.ma.
- Smith, Adrian (2000). "Ethnicity, Economic Polarization and Regional Inequality in Southern Slovakia, Growth and Change". Growth and Change. 31 (2). University of Sussex: 151. doi:10.1111/0017-4815.00124.
- Duray, Miklós (1996). "Hungarian Nation in Slovakia". Slovakia.org Slovakia.org. Archived from the original on 3 February 2013.
- MAR (2006). "Assessment for Hungarians in Slovakia". University of Maryland, College Park. Archived from the original on 2 June 2010.
- Hobsbawm, Eric J. (1990). Nations and nationalism since 1780: programme, myth, reality. Cambridge University Press. ISBN 0-521-33507-8. "...The most immediate demand of Slovak nationalism in 1990 was to 'make Slovak the only official language and force the population of 600,000 ethnic Hungarians to use only Slovak in dealing with authorities'..."
- P. Ramet, Sabrina (1997). Whose democracy?: nationalism, religion, and the doctrine of collective rights in post-1989 Eastern Europe. Rowman & Littlefield. pp. 131–134. ISBN 9780847683246. "[Meciar]...gerrymandered electoral districts in order to reduce ethnic Hungarian strength in parliament..."
- O'Dwyer, Conor (2006). Runaway state-building: patronage politics and democratic development. JHU Press. ISBN 9780801883651.
- Roessingh, Martijn A. (1996). Ethnonationalism and political systems in Europe: a state of tension. Amsterdam University Press. ISBN 978-90-5356-217-8. "In the 1950 census only 367 thousand had declared themselves Hungarian, due to the Slovakization campaign that followed the Second World War"
- Frič, Pavol (1993). Madǎrská menšina na Slovensku (in Czech and English). EGEM. ISBN 80-85395-31-2.
- Špiesz, Anton; Čaplovič, Duśan; J. Bolchazy, Ladislaus (30 July 2006). Illustrated Slovak history: a struggle for sovereignty in Central Europe. Bolchazy-Carducci Publishers. ISBN 978-0-86516-426-0.
- Simon, Attila (2009). "Zabudnutí aktivisti. Príspevok k dejinám maďarských politických strán v medzivojnovom období" [Forgotten activists. A contribution to the history of Hungarian political parties in the inter-war period.]. Historický časopis (in Slovak). 57 (3).
- Popély, Arpád (2009). "Dokument: Záverečná správa o reslovakizačnej akcii" [Document: The final report about re-slovakization action] (PDF). Fórum spoločenskovedná revue (in Slovak) (5). Šamorín: Fórum inštitút pre výskum menšín.
