= Anti-Hungarian sentiment =

Anti-Hungarian sentiment (also known as Hungarophobia, Anti-Hungarianism, Magyarophobia or Antimagyarism) is dislike, distrust, discrimination, or xenophobia directed against Hungarians. It can involve hatred, grievance, distrust, intimidation, fear, and hostility towards the Hungarian people, language and culture.

Most of the anti-Hungarian sentiment and incidents still occur today in Hungary's neighboring countries (modern Romania, Serbia, Slovakia, Ukraine), as their predecessor states received large historical Hungarian territories. Following World War I, the Treaty of Trianon in 1920 led to the separation of 32% of ethnic Hungarians, along with many entirely Hungarian-populated regions, from their historical Hungarian motherland.

== History ==
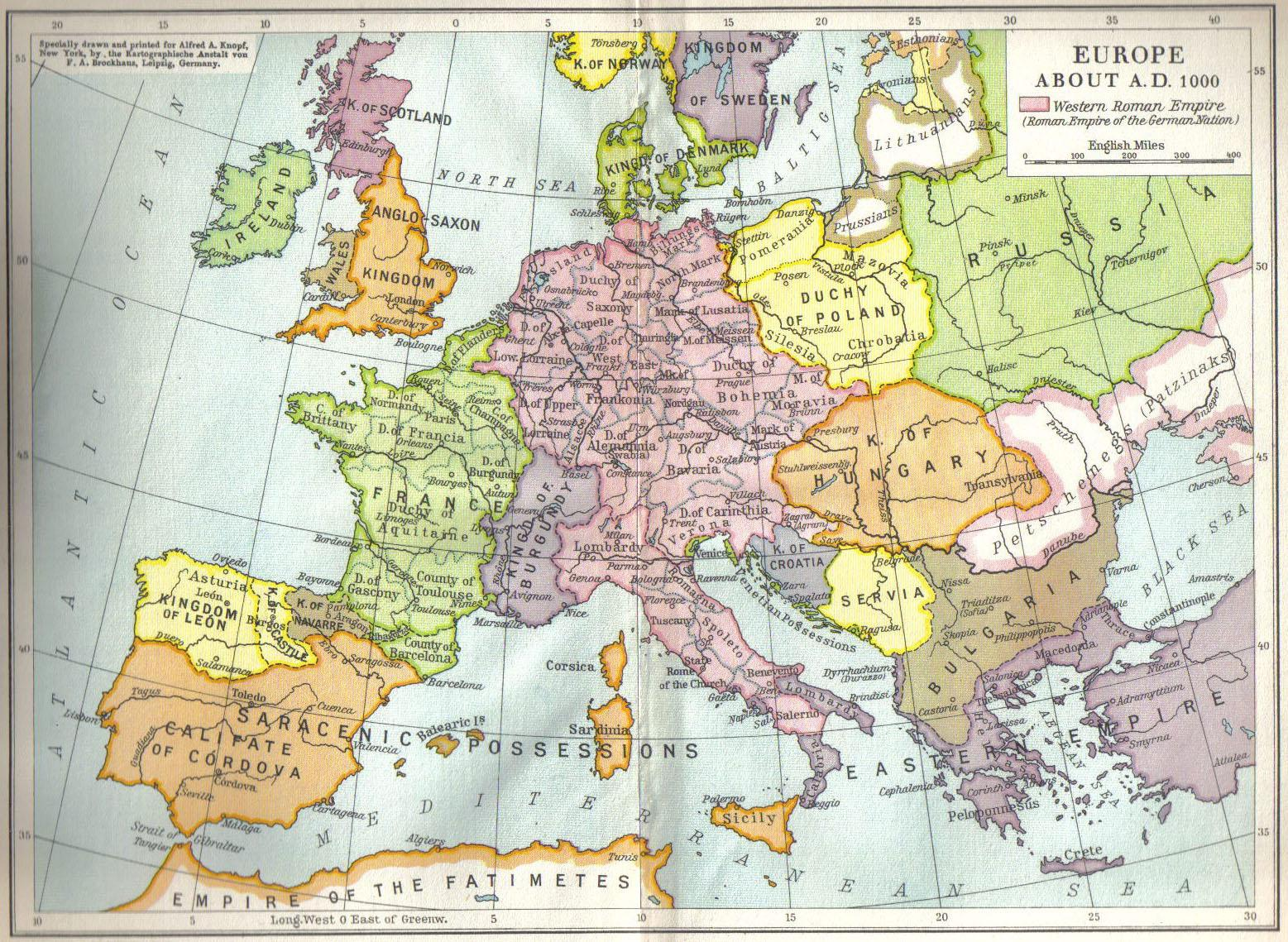
Kingdom of Hungary around 1000

Otto of Freising was a member of the Babenberg dynasty and belonged to the elite of the Holy Roman Empire. In 1146, King Géza II of Hungary, defeated Otto's brother, Henry II Jasomirgott, Duke of Bavaria and Margrave of Austria, at the Battle of the Fischa. Influenced by personal grievances, Otto wrote about Hungary and the Hungarians in 1147:

Because of the frequent barbarian incursions it suffered, it is hardly surprising that, in its customs and language alike, it remained coarse and uncultivated. For first, as we have recounted elsewhere at greater length, it was exposed to the plundering of the Huns, who according to Jordanes were born of demons and wicked women; then it was trampled by the Avars, who fed on raw and unclean flesh; and finally it fell into the possession of the Hungarians who migrated from Scythia and who have lived here ever since. The appearance of these so-called Hungarians is repulsive, their eyes deep-set, their stature short; their language and customs are barbarous and savage. Thus one may rightly accuse blind fortune, or marvel at the patience of God, for having given such a delightful land as prey to these human monsters who scarcely deserve to be called men.

— Otto of Freising

During the existence of the Kingdom of Hungary and Croatia, the Banate of Bosnia was accused of holding the alleged Cathar anti-pope Nicetas. Given that the Kingdom of Hungary and Croatia was under heavy Catholic influence, and Bosnia had a decentralized religious practice, Pope Honorius III would preach about invading Bosnia to pacify Nicetas, whilst Hungary would be able to incorporate Bosnia into its control. Later, in 1235, Hungary, with the justification of Pope Gregory IX would launch the Bosnian Crusade in order to subdue the Banate under its control. However, in 1241, the Mongols invaded Hungary. As a result, the Hungarian troops abandoned the crusade and returned to Hungary to bolster their armies against the Mongols. Bosnia would then regaining its previously conquered territory. This conflict would fuel anti-Hungarian sentiment within the state, which even lasted beyond the Ottoman conquest of Bosnia.

During the era of the Habsburg monarchs, the court in Vienna was influenced by Hungarophobia, but the Hungarian landowner nobles also showed signs of Germanophobia. In the 18th century, after the end of Rákóczi's War of Independence, many immigrants came to the underpopulated southern parts of the Kingdom of Hungary: for instance, 800 new German villages were established. The authorities preferred non-Hungarian settlers. The Habsburgs regarded the Hungarians as "politically unreliable", and consequently they were not allowed to settle in the southern territories until the 1740s. The organized resettlement was planned by the Habsburgs. The resettlement policy was characterized as anti-Hungarian by scholar Istvàn Sisa, and the Habsburgs feared an uprising of Protestant Hungarians.

=== 1848–1849 massacres in Transylvania ===
During Hungarian Revolution and War of Independence of 1848–1849, thousands of Hungarians were murdered in Transylvania (now part of Romania) in at least nine separate major incidents during the 1848–1849 massacres in Transylvania, which also included massacres against Romanians.

Following several days of massacres of Hungarians in Abrudbánya (today Abrud, Romania), Avram Iancu issued the order, "No more killing; those who remain, until now, let them live." But the order did not find unanimous approval, a Romanian lancer even challenged Iancu: "Well, why did you swear us on the mountain that we should not leave even a cat alive, much less a Hungarian soul? – By God, I will kill, and we will kill them all."

== Treaty of Trianon ==
Mihály Károlyi had become prime minister of Hungary as a result of the 1918 Aster Revolution. Mihály Károlyi yielded to President Wilson's demand for pacifism by ordering the unilateral self-disarmament of the Hungarian army. At the time of the collapse, the Hungarian Royal Honvéd army still had more than 1,400,000 soldiers. This happened under the direction of Minister of War Béla Linder on 2 November 1918 On the request of the Austro-Hungarian government, an armistice was granted to Austria-Hungary on 3 November 1918 by the Allies. Disarmament of its army meant that Hungary was to remain without a national defence at a time of particular vulnerability. The unilateral self-disarmament made the occupation of Hungary directly possible for the relatively small armies of Romania, the Franco-Serbian army, and the armed forces of the newly established Czechoslovakia.

Austria-Hungary collapsed after World War I, and the subsequent Treaty of Trianon in 1920 established Hungary's current borders, resulting in the loss of 72% of its historical territory, majority of its economy, 58% of its population, and 32% of its ethnic Hungarians. Two-thirds of territory of the Kingdom of Hungary was ceded to Kingdom of Romania, Czechoslovakia, Kingdom of Serbs, Croats and Slovenes, First Austrian Republic, Second Polish Republic and Kingdom of Italy.

Often referred to in Hungary as the Dictate of Trianon. The treaty completely deprived the Hungarians of their right to self-determination, with the sole exception of the 1921 Sopron plebiscite after the Uprising in West Hungary.

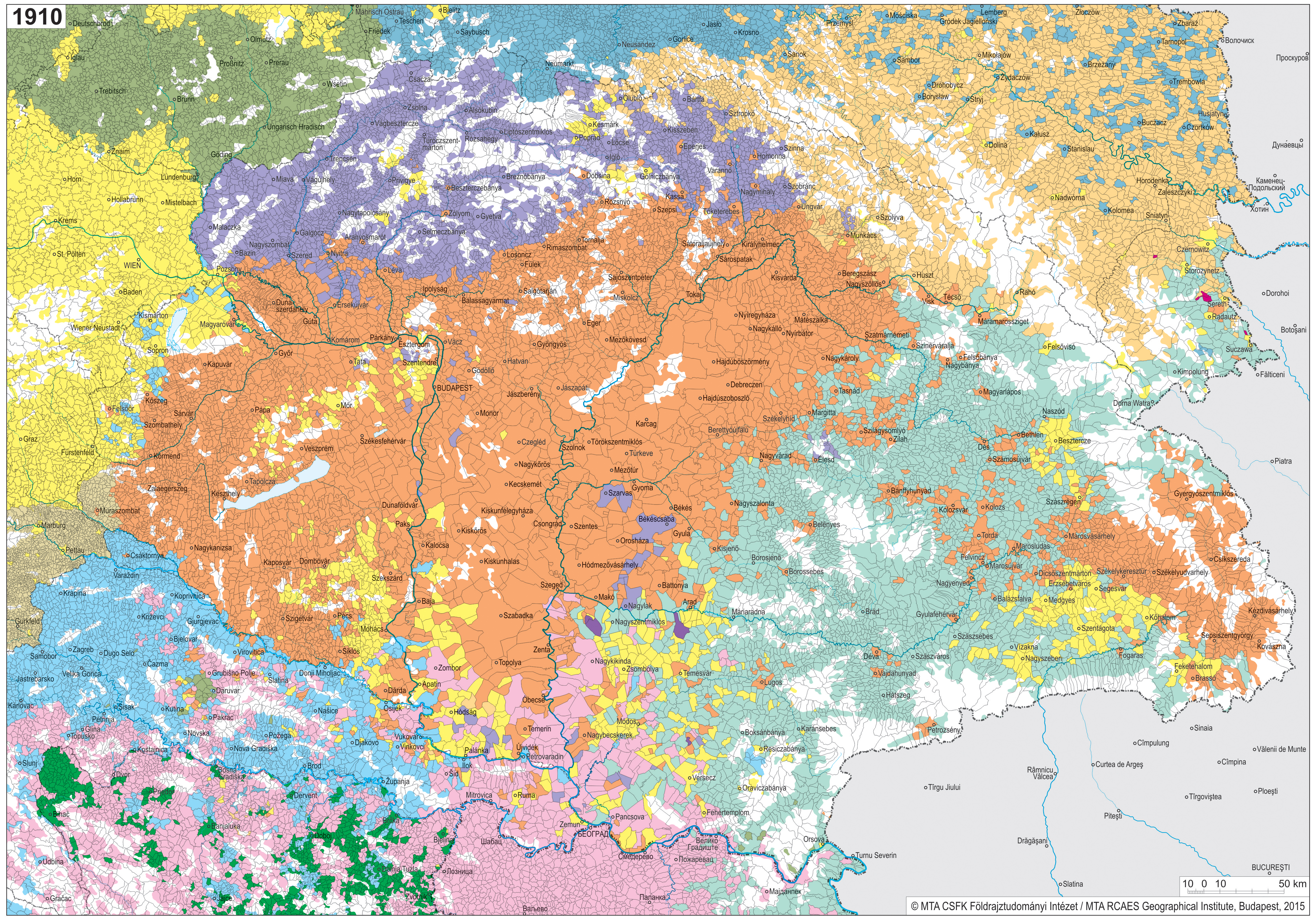
Ethnic map of the Kingdom of Hungary in 1910, based on the 1910 Hungarian census, the Hungarians depicted in orange.

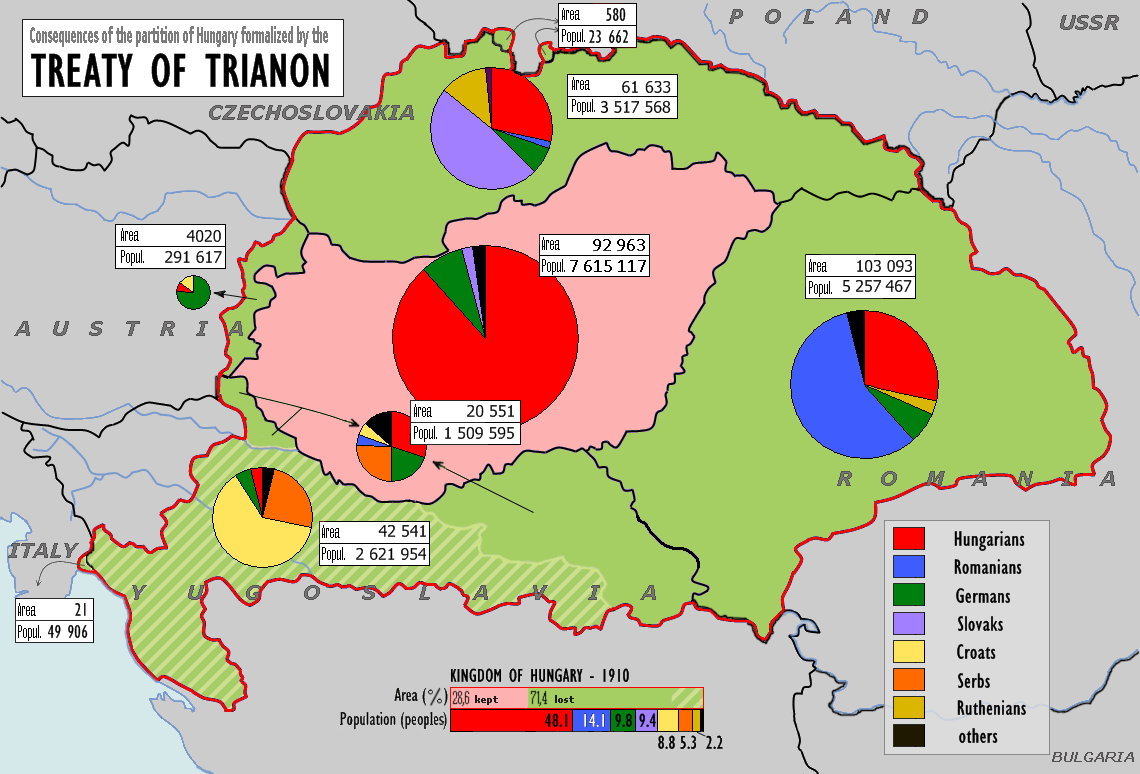
The Treaty of Trianon in 1920 resulted in the loss of 72% of the historical territory of the Kingdom of Hungary, 58% of its population, and 32% of its ethnic Hungarian population. As a result, 3,425,000 ethnic Hungarians were separated from their motherland and became minorities in Austria, Czechoslovakia, Romania, and Yugoslavia.

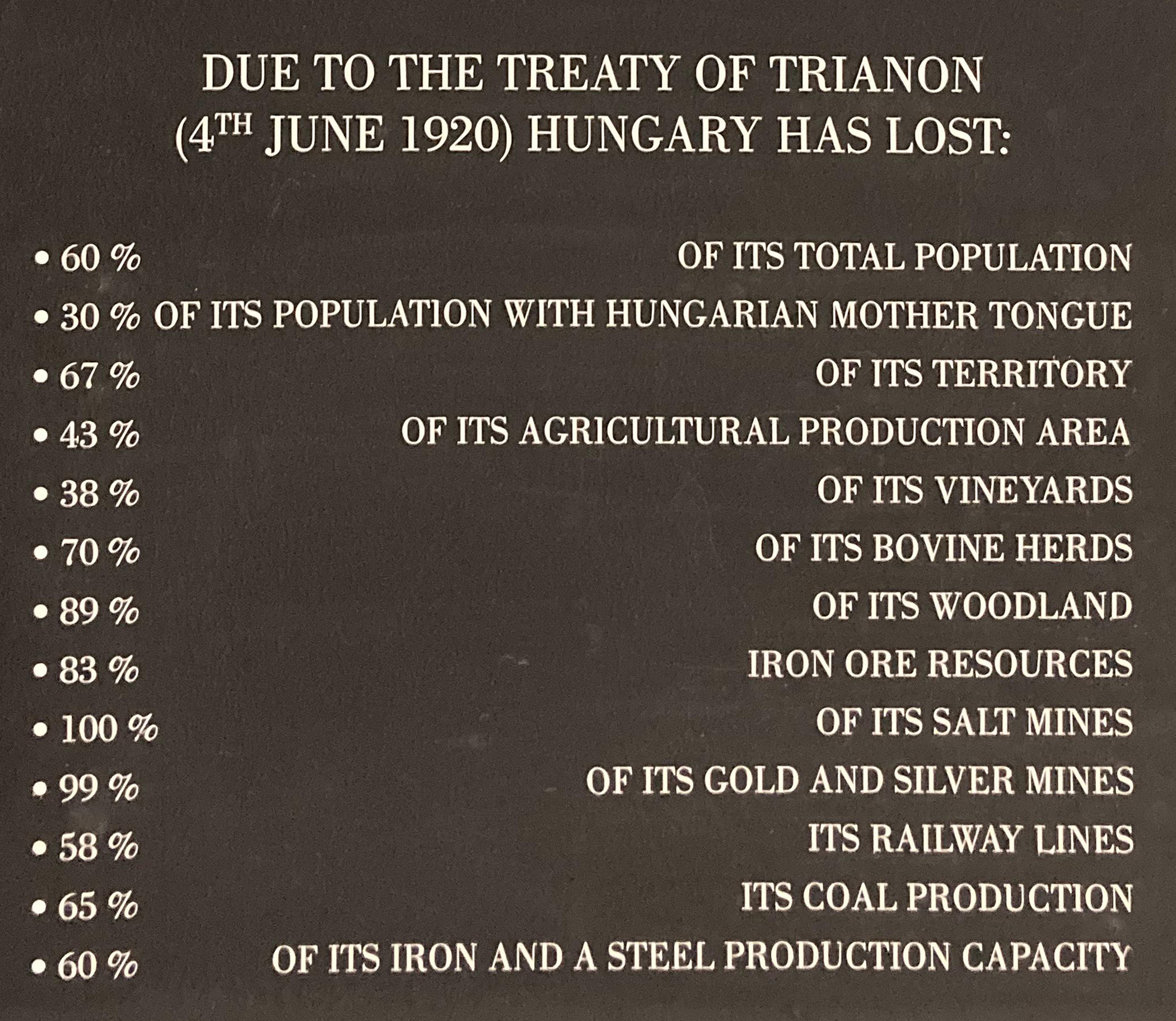
Economic consequences for Hungary after the Treaty of Trianon, resulting in the loss of most of the country's economy.

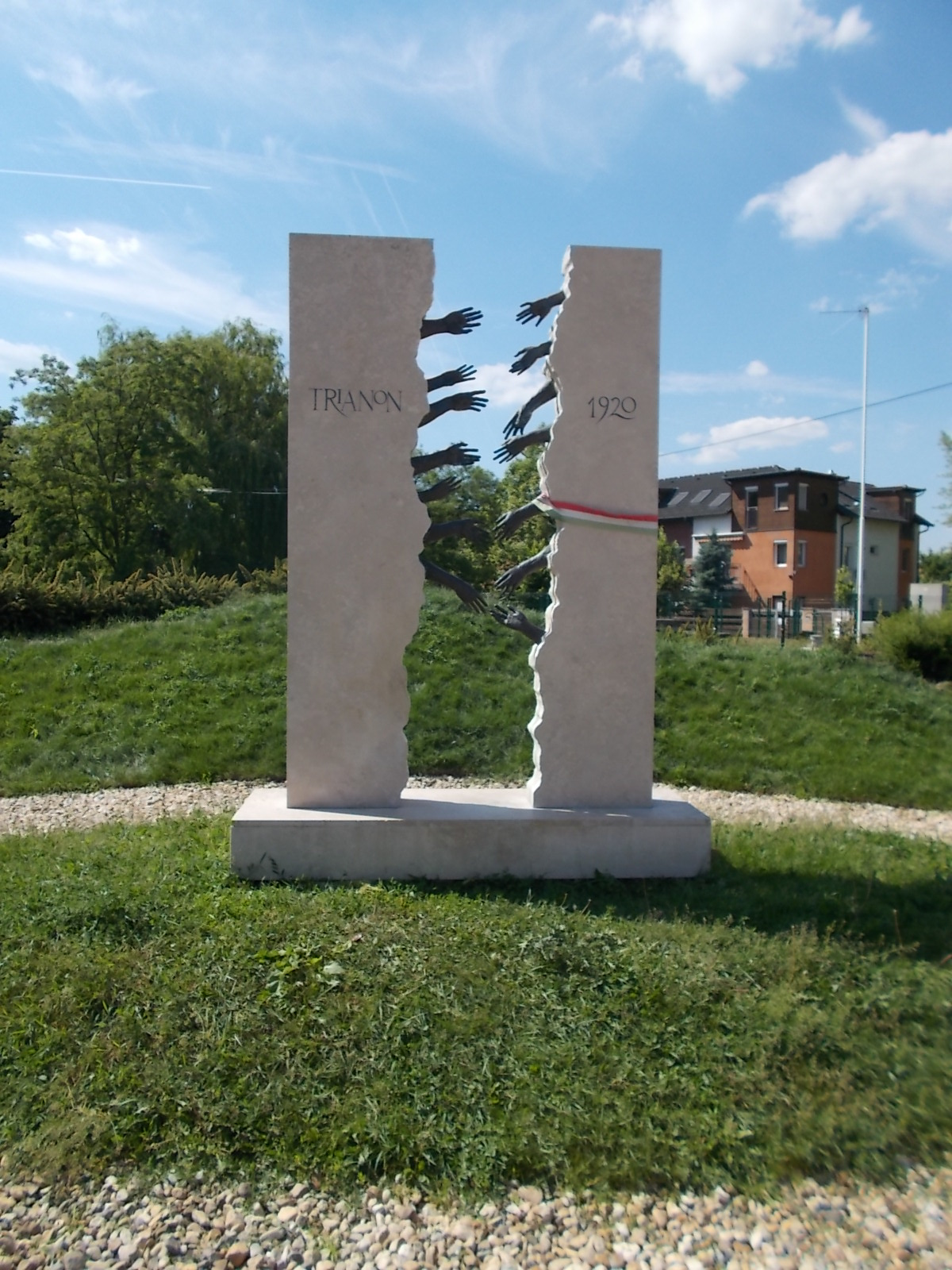
Hungary is filled with Trianon memorials, as the Treaty of Trianon is considered the greatest tragedy in modern Hungarian history.

== Czechoslovakia and Slovakia ==
=== Czechoslovakia (1920–1993) ===
Minorities in Czechoslovakia in 1918 to 1939 enjoyed personal freedoms and were properly recognized by the state, although they suffered from "indirect" forms of discrimination (such as anti-minority gerrymandering).

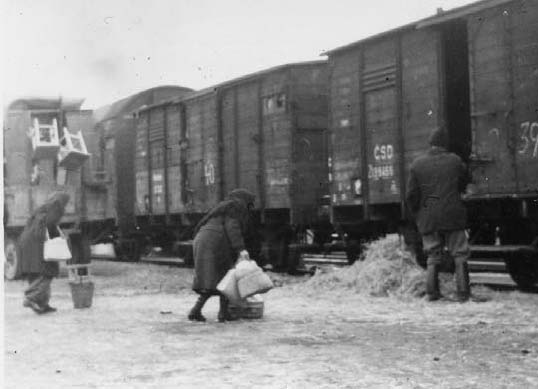
Hungarians forcibly relocated by Beneš decrees

After World War II, Czechoslovakia became a communist state; during the transition to a communist one-party state, decrees declaring the legality of the collective punishment of and permitting the forced expulsion of German and Hungarian minorities from ethnic enclaves in Czechoslovakia, as well as stripping them of Czechoslovak citizenship came into effect, and Hungarians were forcibly relocated to Sudetenland, on the borders of Czechoslovakia. The Czechoslovak government deported more than 44,129 Hungarians from Slovakia to the Sudetenland for forced labor between 1945 and 1948, and the Beneš decrees remain legally in effect in the Czech Republic and Slovakia.

=== Slovakia (1993–present) ===
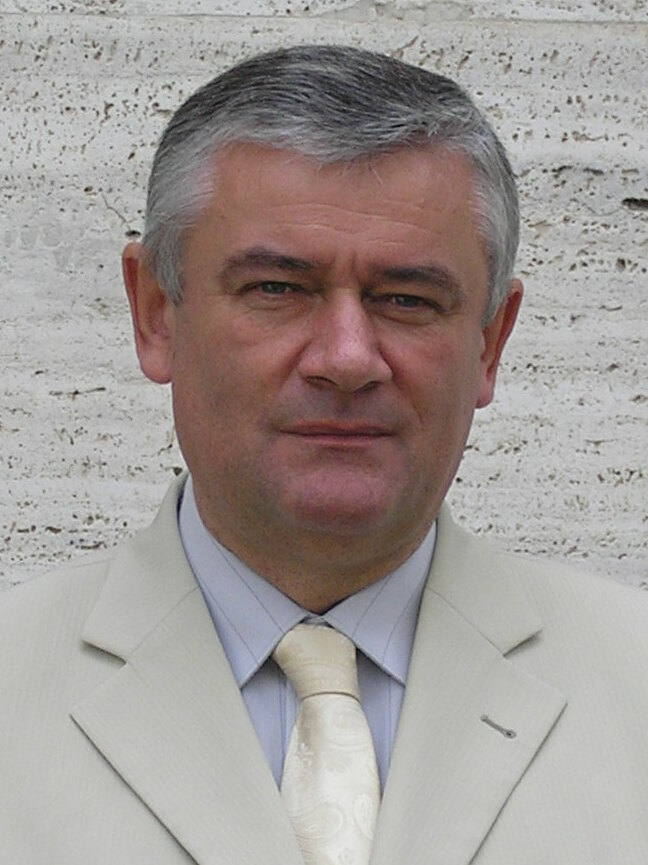
Ján Slota, the ex-chairman of Slovak National Party SNS, claimed that the Hungarian minority of Slovakia "is a tumour in the body of the Slovak nation".

In Slovakia, Hungarian and pro-Hungarian political parties are a stable part of the political system. Anti-Hungarian sentiment had been criticized particularly during the third government of Vladimír Mečiar. In the past, so-called "Hungarian card" had been used mainly by the Slovak National Party (SNS) against the granting of a special status to the Hungarian minority; it argued for the complete assimilation of the Hungarian minority into Slovak society. It considers that Hungarians in Slovakia are actually overprivileged. After personnel changes in the presidium, SNS abandoned similar rhetoric and formed a common government with pro-Hungarian Most-Híd in 2016.

Anti-Hungarian rhetoric of some far-right organizations in Slovakia is based on historical stereotypes and conflicts in the common history as interpreted from nationalistic positions and recent events. In such interpretations, the arrival of old Hungarian tribes is described as the occupation by barbarian tribes and contributed to the destruction of Great Moravia. Other negative sentiments are related to the period of Magyarization, the policy of interwar Hungary, the collaboration of Hungarian-minority parties with the Hungarian government against Czechoslovakia, the First Vienna Award and the Slovak–Hungarian War. Hungary is accused of still trying to undermine the territorial integrity of Slovakia, and local minority politicians are accused of irredentism. However, anti-Hungarian sentiment is not typical even for all far-right organisations, and the leader of the Slovak Brotherhood emphasized the need for collaboration with Hungarian far-right organisations against materialism and multiculturalism.

Women, Slovak or not, used to be required to affix the Slovak feminine marker -ová (used for declension of feminine names) at the end of their surname.

One incident of ethnically motivated violence against Hungarians in Slovakia is the Hedvig Malina case. A 23-year-old Hungarian student girl Malina from Horné Mýto claimed she was severely beaten and robbed on 25 August 2006 in Nitra after speaking Hungarian in public. She claimed her attackers wrote "SK (probably Slovakia) without parasites", and "Hungarians to the other side of the Danube" on her clothes. The Slovak authorities charged Malina with perjury, the police initiated criminal prosecution against Malina, who, in turn, brought the case to the Constitutional Court. In August 2007, a former high-ranking police officer, Jozef Šátek, filed a complaint against Slovak Prime Minister Robert Fico, Kaliňák and Packa, claiming that they had abused their power in connection with the Malina case. In October 2007, Tom Lantos, Hungarian-born Democratic member of the United States House of Representatives, asked Prime Minister Fico to distance themselves from the Beneš decrees, for a reasonable process in the Malina case, and to treat members of the Hungarian minority as equals. Lantos also blamed Fico for creating the climate for anti-Hungarian sentiments by including "voluntarily in his coalition individuals with known ultra-nationalist, anti-Hungarian attitudes". Malina then took her case to the European Court of Human Rights, challenging what she calls the "inhuman and humiliating" conduct of the Slovak officials. On 8 November 2011 the European Court of Human Rights approved the Slovak government's apology. The Slovak Government expressed its regret, saying that "some elements of Malina's case raised doubts over whether her rights stipulated by the European Convention of Human Rights may have been violated."

A football match in Dunajská Streda also caused tensions between Slovakia and Hungary when Hungarian fans were badly beaten by the Slovak police.

The majority and the Hungarian minority describe their coexistence mostly as good. For example, in a public survey in 2015, 85.2% of respondents characterized their coexistence as good (63.6% rather good, 21.6% very good) and only 7.6% as bad (6.3% rather bad, 1.3% very bad).

In 2025, a 20-year-old Hungarian man was stabbed in Bratislava because he was speaking Hungarian. While waiting in line for food, a Slovak man approached a group of Hungarians who were chatting and asked why they were speaking Hungarian, they replied "because we are Hungarians". The aggressive Slovak individual told them to go to the other side of the Danube (to Hungary) to eat if they speak Hungarian, a sentiment commonly expressed by extremist groups. The local Hungarian party has described the incident as a hate crime. Hungarian students organised a protest after the attack.

=== Wartime ethnic decrees to take land form Hungarians ===
In the 21st-century European Union, Slovakia, a democratic state, is still using the racist World War II Beneš decrees to justify taking land from Hungarians. The Beneš decrees used ethnic classification, stripped ethnic Germans and Hungarians of property. Many confiscation cases remained unfinished because of procedural errors. Today, Slovak authorities claim to "correct" these historical mistakes by seizing land from Hungarian descendants. Between 2019 and 2025, more than 1,000 hectares have been confiscated, often without proper notice or legal remedy. Representatives of the Hungarian minority had previously warned that confiscations were restarting. Prime Minister Robert Fico's government declared the Beneš decrees "untouchable", the government responded with aggressive rhetoric, claiming criticism of the decrees as an attack on Slovak sovereignty.

== Romania ==
=== Interwar and WW2 Romania (1920–1947) ===
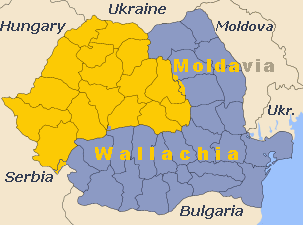
After World War I, by the Treaty of Trianon in 1920, Romania received significant historical lands from Hungary (marked in yellow), which had a 46% non-Romanian population, with many regions and cities almost entirely populated by Hungarians. Ethnic tensions persist to this day, with ethnic Hungarians still being targeted.

During World War I, Romania had been forced into a separate peace with the Central Powers. The World War I turned in favor of the Entente powers, Romania reentered the conflict on 10 November 1918, just one day before the general armistice. Although Romania violated the terms of the Treaty of Bucharest, the victorious powers ultimately placed no obstacles, and continued to tolerate Romania's unlawful actions. Romania not only breached the agreements by launching a military campaign to occupy Transylvania on 12 November – one day before the Armistice of Belgrade – but also by crossing the demarcation line established at that armistice, the Mureș River, on 8 December. Taking advantage of the passivity of the Budapest government, which had renounced armed resistance, Romanian forces occupied a large portion of the territories they had claimed.

After World War I, at Gyulafehérvér (now Alba Iulia) the Romanian National Assembly proclaimed the Union of Transylvania with Romania on 1 December 1918. In the assembly, 1,228 delegates present declared their intention for Transylvania, the Körös region, the Banat, and Máramaros – altogether 26 historic counties of the Kingdom of Hungary – to unite with the Kingdom of Romania. Although the decision of Romanians was the result of a unilateral resolution, it completely deprived the Hungarians of their right to self-determination. The Székelys at the end of November, and the Hungarians of Kolozsvár (now Cluj) made also an assembly on 2 December and declared that they did not wish to be part of Romania, despite the Romanian occupation continued as far as Western Hungary. The Treaty of Trianon in 1920 drew a border that placed about 1,658,045 Hungarians under Romanian rule, although the territory granted was smaller than what Romania had originally demanded. The nation-state ambitions of Greater Romania, once realized, were soon followed by the abandonment of multiple of the promises made at the Assembly of Alba Iulia. Instead, the Romanian state increasingly sought to assert ethnic and national homogenization at the expense of the Hungarian population.

=== Communist Romania (1947–1989) ===
Forced assimilation under the Ceaușescu regime

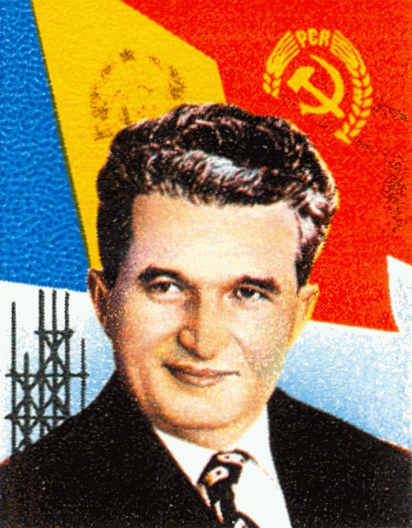
Nicolae Ceaușescu, national communism dictator of Socialist Republic of Romania

The national-communist Ceaușescu regime pursued policies aimed at assimilating Romania's national minorities. Hungarian-language education was a particular target. Hungarian schools were closed, and Hungarian-language sections in elementary and secondary schools were greatly reduced. Hungarian-language classes were often eliminated by replacing Hungarian teachers with Romanian teachers who did not speak Hungarian. Hungarian-language higher education was virtually destroyed under Ceaușescu: The historic Hungarian-language Bolyai University was forced to merge with the Romanian Babeș University in 1959. During the mid-1980s, a large number of Romanian teachers who had no knowledge of Hungarian were assigned to regions with significant Hungarian populations. As of 1985, students were no longer permitted to take university entrance examinations in Hungarian language. The policy resulted in a significant decrease in the number of classes that could be taught in Hungarian and severely restricted Hungarian-language higher education.

In Romania, the Ceaușescu regime gave great focus to the ancient history of Transylvania. National communism in Romania made historical personalities of Hungary (such as John Hunyadi or György Dózsa) go through Romanianization and become more central figures in Romanian history.

The Civic Forum of the Romanians of Covasna, Harghita and Mureș, founded in 2005 with the aim of coordinating the ethnic Romanians at Covasna, Harghita and Mureș counties, has been accused of being anti-Hungarian.

=== Democratic Romania (1989–present) ===
A 1993 Helsinki Watch report documented the resurgence of anti-Hungarian rhetoric in Romania following the fall of Ceaușescu, the increasing presence of anti-Hungarian propaganda in parts of the Romanian press and political discourse.

==== Alliance for the Union of Romanians ====
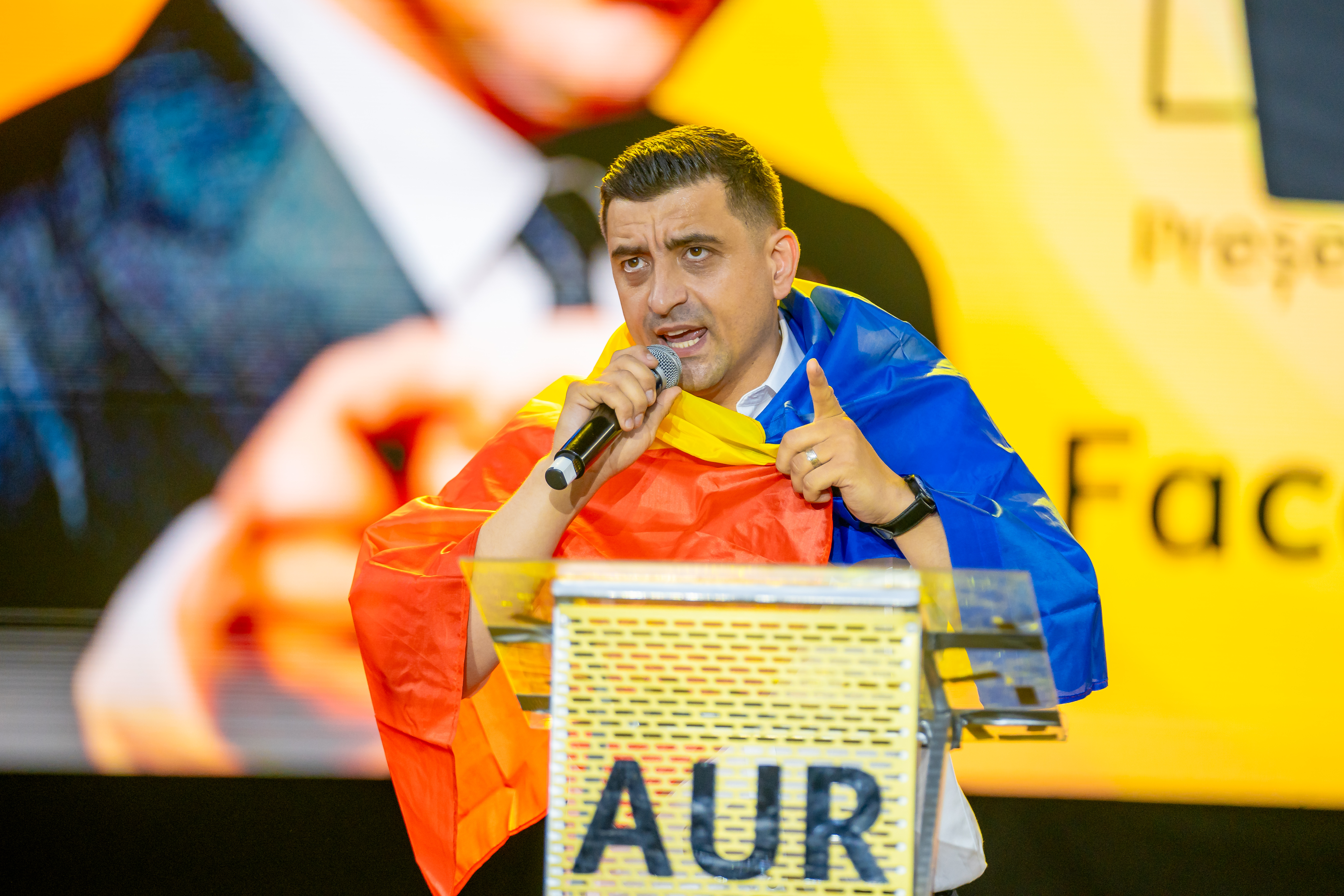
George Simion, leader of the far-right AUR party, is notorious for his anti-Hungarian sentiments, promoting hostility toward the indigenous Hungarian community in Romania

== Soviet Union and Ukraine ==
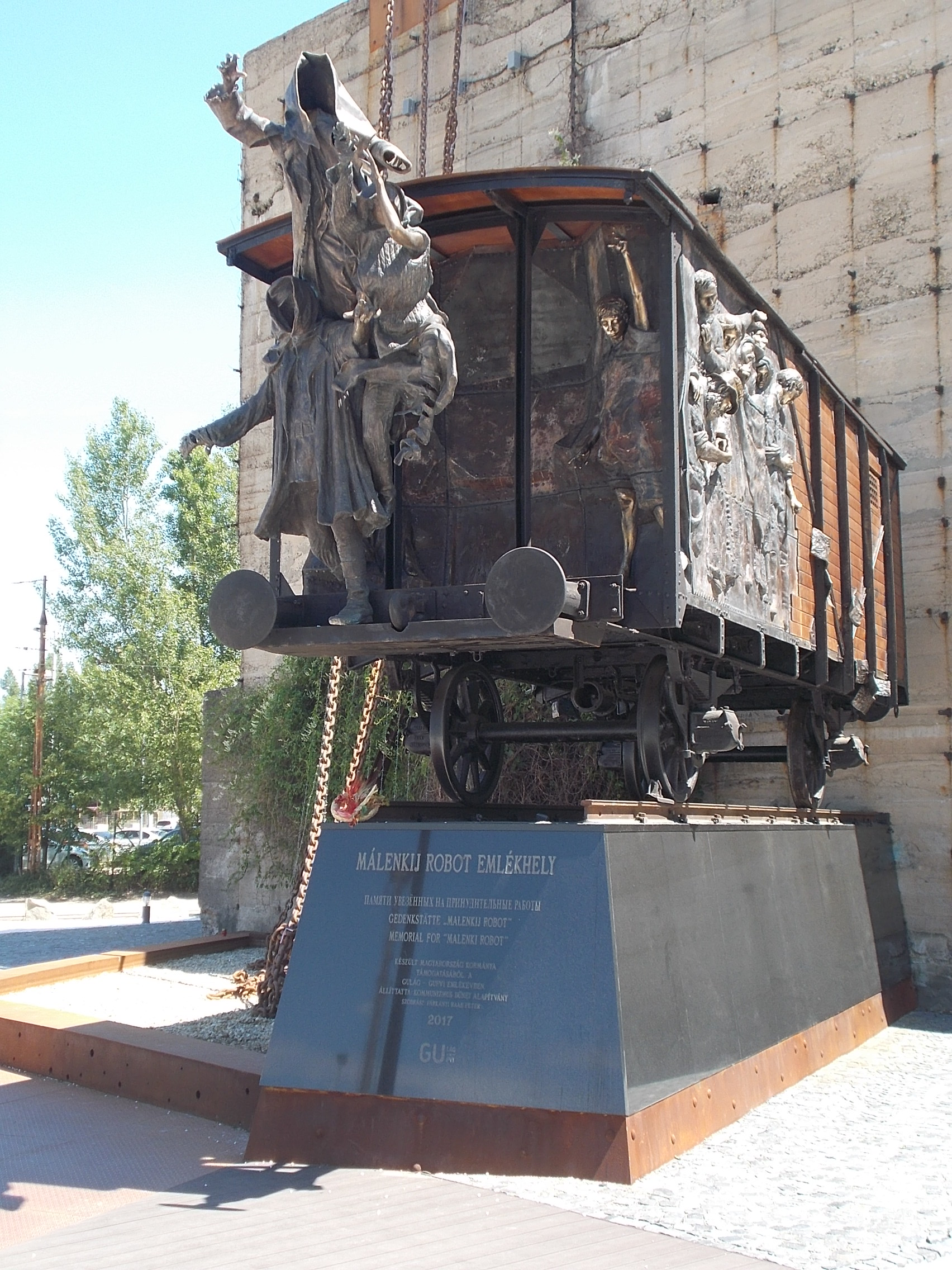
Forced labor of Hungarians in the Soviet Union Memorial Place,Budapest, Hungary

Transcarpathia (Kárpátalja in Hungarian), from the Hungarian conquest of the Carpathian Basin (at the end of the 9th century) to the end of World War I (Treaty of Trianon in 1920), most of this region was part of the Kingdom of Hungary. In the interwar period, it was part of the First and Second Czechoslovak Republics. Before World War II, the region was annexed by the Kingdom of Hungary once again when Germany dismembered the Second Czechoslovak Republic. After the war, it was annexed by the Soviet Union and became part of the Ukrainian Soviet Socialist Republic. In 1991, Transcarpathia became part of Ukraine as the Soviet Union dissolved.

=== Soviet Union (1945–1991) ===
It was one of the greatest Hungarian tragedies of the 20th century. An estimated 800,000 Hungarians were deported to the forced labor camps in the Soviet Union during and after the World War II, and nearly 300,000 died on the way or while imprisoned in the camps. Upon returning to Hungary, the survivors were forced by the communist secret services to stay quiet about their ordeal.

=== Ukraine (1991–present) ===
Before the Holocaust and Soviet deportations, there were approximately 250,000 Hungarian speakers in Zakarpattia, around 27% of the total population. They constituted majorities or pluralities in several towns and cities, including Mukachevo (Hungarian: Munkács.) Many of these Hungarian speakers were also Jews. Today, Hungarian speakers are around 15% of the population in Zakarpattia, numbering around 150,000, forming majorities or pluralities along the Hungarian border and in some towns, including Berehove (Hungarian: Beregszász.)

On 13 March 2016, approximately 300 members of Carpathian Sich, Pravy Sektor, and the Azov civil organization demonstrated on the streets of Uzhhorod. During the protest, they shouted slogans such as "Knives to the throats of the Hungarians!". During the march, activists from these extreme Ukrainian nationalist organizations called for the annihilation of the Hungarian ethnic group. Investigations were subsequently initiated, but no arrests were made.

In October of 2018, Ukrainian politician Iryna Farion compared ethnic Hungarians to "dogs who cannot learn the language of Stepan Bandera", she said "Do we need these idiots in Ukraine? Why should I feed them?" and suggested they "go back to Hungary!"

In December 2020, a group of Ukrainians planned to poison the water system of the city of Berehove (a Hungarian-majority city according to the 2001 census) with cyanide in order to eliminate Hungarians.

The European Council, the Venice Commission and the Hungarian Human Rights Foundation have argued the Ukrainian state discriminates against Hungarian speakers. The Hungarian Human Rights Foundation said of new reforms legislated in December, 2023:

"We note with regret that the adopted law still does not allow the use of minority languages at the level of higher administrative units (district, county). At the local settlement level, use of language rights remains subject to the majority decision – meaning that enforcement of language rights will not be implemented in most locales ... The law links linguistic rights to the concept of “traditional” settlement of the minority and sets the minimum level at 10%. Accordingly, in locations where the minority population does not reach this threshold (i.e. those in diaspora) will have no language rights at all, which further accelerates their assimilation. The legislation affects only the linguistic rights of minorities; other minority rights are completely left out. The law still does not provide for the free use of national symbols, nor does it provide the conditions to ensure political representation for minorities. Several clauses of the law are discriminatory or merely declarative, which can lead to arbitrary interpretation. The meaning of several legal terms remains unclear. This raises further questions, primarily relating to the right to native-language education alongside the state language. The law still does not comply with all the recommendations of the Venice Commission; does not ensure the rights guaranteed to minorities in the Constitution and other international documents; and does not restore the full range of previously existing minority rights."

At the same time, László Zubánics, head of the Hungarian Democratic Alliance of Ukraine, said these reforms 'essentially gave the Hungarian community of Zakarpattia the opportunity to ensure its own existence for another 30 years.'

Ukrainian politician Viktor Baloha and his son Andrij have both made remarks described as Hungarophobic. The former alleged Hungarian prime minister Viktor Orbán was responsible for his ban from the Schengen Area while Andrij, the mayor of Mukachevo, removed a Turul statue from the city's castle.

== Yugoslavia and Serbia ==
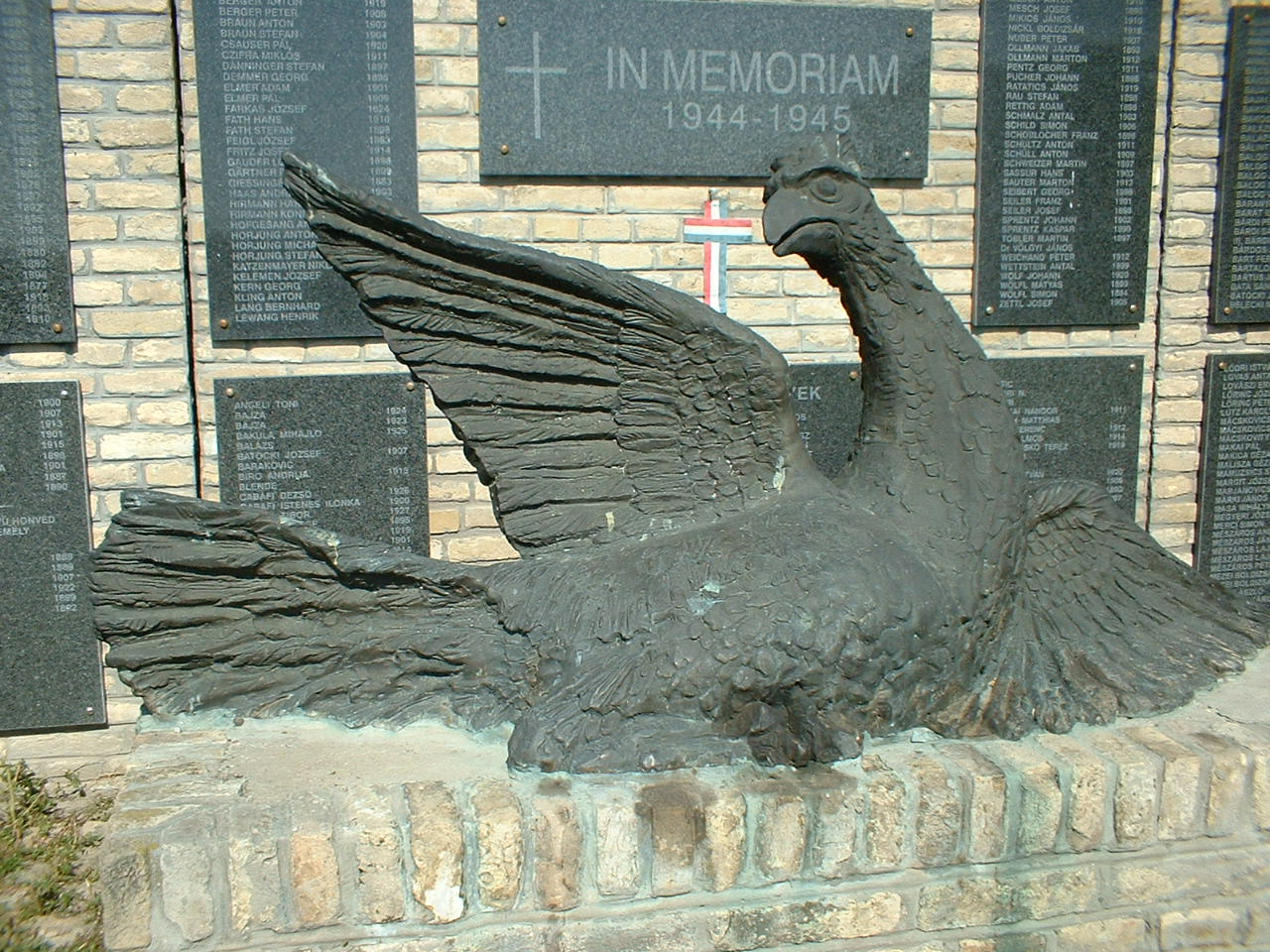
The Hungarian victims' memorial in Subotica cemetery, elevated for the 50th anniversary of the executions in 1994.

=== Yugoslavia (1920–1992) ===
According to other estimations, the number range of the executed Hungarians in Vojvodina in 1944–1945 may be between 40,000 and 50,000. Some sources claim that the most probable number of the executed Hungarians in Vojvodina was between 20,000 and 25,000, while others claim that it is about 35,000 (Cseres Tibor gives an exact estimate of 34,491 executed people).

During World War II, some Hungarian houses were sacked and a number of Hungarian civilians were executed and tortured. Some women and children were raped.

== Derogatory terms ==
=== In English ===
- Mongol – used by Romanian, Slovakian and Serbian nationalists, as a slur against Hungarians to insult them regarding the hypothesis of the Hun origin of the Hungarian conquerors.

=== In Romanian ===
Mongol ethnic slur against Hungarians in Romania, alongside a depiction of Avram Iancu, whose forces massacred Hungarian civilians during the 1848–1849 conflict

The slurs Bozgor, Bozgoroaică and Bozgori are pseudo-Magyar terms of possible Romanian or Slavic origin describing Hungarians. A view is that it means "homeless" or "stateless". Sándor N. Szilágyi speculated that the word is a combination of the Hungarian slur ba(s)zd meg ("fuck you") and the Romanian word for Hungarian, namely ungur.

== See also ==
- Beneš decrees
- Nicolae Ceaușescu
- Romanianization
- Serbianization
- Slovakisation
- Treaty of Trianon

== Bibliography ==
- Gerő, András; Patterson, James (1995). Modern Hungarian society in the making: the unfinished experience. Central European University Press.
