= 2006 Slovak–Hungarian diplomatic affairs =

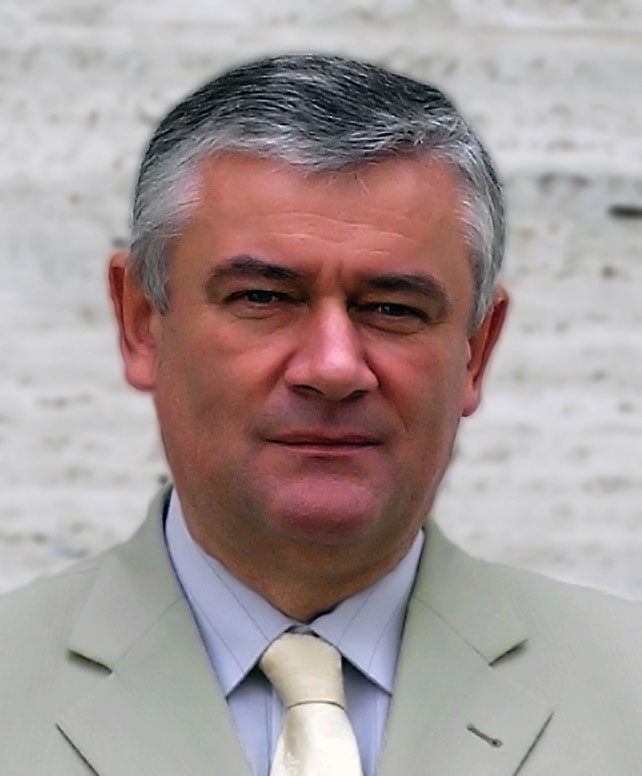
Ján Slota, the chairman of Slovak government Party SNS, according to whom the Hungarian population of Slovakia "is cancer in the body of the Slovak nation."

The Slovak–Hungarian diplomatic affairs of 2006 were a series of ethnic and diplomatic affairs between Slovakia and Hungary.

== Flag burning ==
The situation escalated further after the parliamentary elections in June 2006, after which the party of the Hungarian minority SMK was not invited into the new government coalition. After a series of bitter comments from both sides, a short movie presumably depicting a group of Slovak nationalists instigating against the Hungarian minority by burning the Hungarian flag appeared on YouTube.com, which was removed from YouTube due to a terms of use violation on the day it was announced. A day later, anti-Slovak graffiti appeared on Slovakia's embassy in Budapest.

=== Ethnic conflicts ===
In August 2006 in a few days time the following incidents were reported: In Komárno a man was severely beaten because he spoke Hungarian on the street. In the smaller towns of southern Slovakia a woman was allegedly harassed by the hospital staff because of the same reason. This was reported from Nové Zámky, Šaľa and Veľký Krtíš. In Nové Zámky a graffiti saying "Hungarians (should go) to the other side of Danube" appeared on a Hungarian family house. In Bratislava, the statue of Sándor Petőfi, the popular Hungarian poet (of Slovak origin), was damaged on 24 August, which had happened many times in the past decades. According to Béla Bugár, a politician of the SMK, such incidents weren't typical in the past 8 years (when his SMK was in the government), and the Slovak government should take the worsening ethnic tensions seriously.

After these incidents another film was uploaded to the Internet, which was made in April at a Slovak second division football match between Slovan and Dunajská Streda, showing a Kingdom of Hungary map for some seconds, then it was creased and savaged, then started hailing Jan Slota and shouted "101% anti-Hungarian", "Slovakia is the Slovak's" and several fascist slogans. The attempt by the Hungarian diplomacy to delete it from the Internet was successful, but soon Slovak football fans protested against local Hungarians in Bratislava (Pozsony) with slogans: "Fucking Hungarians go home!" . After that there was an anti-Slovak protest as a response by football fans in Budapest (they said "Fucking Slovakia", "Slovaks, you will always remain our slaves", "Slota must die"), six protesters were arrested. On 25 August an ethnic Hungarian female university student called Hedvig Malina was severely beaten and the statements "SK (probably means Slovakia) without parasites!", "Hungarians to the other side of the Danube!" was written on her clothes in the town of Nitra. On 12 September, the police concluded that this was a staged attack, although the girl denied it. According to Új Szó, some pictures and more evidence was found and attempted to pass to the local police about the incident, but they refused to take them.

According to this, a bit later, on a Banská Bystrica football match a placard was handed out, with "Death to the Hungarians!" written on it.

On 26 August a 19-year-old Hungarian man was seriously beaten in Sladkovičovo. According to Slovak sources this had no ethnic background, but was a usual crime. The victim said that before he was beaten the assailants asked him: "Do you know where Ján Slota lives?"

As a response on 29 August, the statue of Friedrich Habsburg in Mosonmagyaróvár was damaged and anti-Slovak graffiti appeared there. On 29–31 August, several road signs of towns and villages inhabited by the Slovak minority in Hungary were destroyed or damaged.

As a response to this series of attacks, the Slovak Police announced that it would use its special forces to fight political extremists. The deputy prime minister of Slovakia Dušan Čaplovič officially met with Béla Bugár to discuss the new measures against extremists and he publicly supported a SMK-sponsored declaration against the recent violent attacks. In late August, several Slovak persons (football hooligans having held anti-Hungarian inscriptions) were sentenced to prison in Slovakia for "inciting ethnic and racial hatred". In addition, police began investigations in all the above-mentioned cases.

Slovak authorities promised to take action, but they also accused Hungarian counterparts of overreacting to these incidents, saying similar accidents do not usually get government attention.

According to the mainstream Hungarian and Slovak media, this series of incidents was encouraged by the fact that Ján Slota's party joined the ruling coalition government or by his anti-Hungarian statements, described by the Hungarian Human Rights Foundation as ultra-nationalist, made in early summer.

== Political affairs and statements ==
On 26 August Hungarian Prime Minister, Ferenc Gyurcsány said there is a direct connection between the governmental role of Slota's party and the incidents. According to Gyurcsány: "The Ghost is already out of the bottle". Gyurcsány said that guaranteeing the safety of the Hungarian minority in Slovakia is the personal responsibility of Slovak PM Robert Fico who signed the coalition with Slota. The Slovak ambassador's deputy in Budapest was called to the Hungarian Ministry of Foreign Affairs where he received an official note of protest from the Hungarian Government.

In the last week of August negotiations between the Slovak and Hungarian government somewhat eased the tensions between the two countries. Both Prime Ministers condemned any kind of ethnic violence. On the other hand, leading politicians of the Smer, ruling party of the Slovak government, blamed the Party of the Hungarian Coalition for internationally discrediting Slovakia. On 4 September, Boris Zala, deputy president of the Smer accused Hungarian minority politicians with disloyalty to Slovakia.

After the Slovakia elections of 2006, the victorious left-wing party, Smer, formed a coalition with the right-wing nationalist party, SNS (Slovak National Party), whose leader, Ján Slota, is notorious for anti-Hungarian statements. Ján Slota himself is not in the government (a condition for the inclusion of his party in the government was that he will not himself be a member of the government). The program of the new government explicitly says that it will maintain the status quo of the minority institutions and rights. The new government, however, refused to distance itself from the extremist statements of Slota on the grounds that he is not a member of the government and his statements are not official.

== See also ==
- Slovakization
- Hungary–Slovakia relations
- Hedvig Malina
- 2009 ban of Hungarian President from Slovakia
