= True Slovak National Party =

Slovak political party

The True Slovak National Party, also translated as Real Slovak National Party or Right Slovak National Party (Slovak: Pravá Slovenská národná strana), was a minor extreme far-right political party in Slovakia. At the 20 and 21 September 2002 legislative elections, the party won 3.7% of the popular vote and no seats. Since that time, the party re-merged with the SNS, which elected Ján Slota chairman.

== History ==
In 2000, the internal conflicts within the Slovak National Party (SNS) between Anna Malíková (later known as Anna Belousovová) and Ján Slota finally led to a split, by shutting out Ján Slota and 7 other MPs of the SNS, who founded the True Slovak National Party in late 2001. The founding congress elected unanimously Ján Slota chairman of the party. After the unsuccessful parliamentary elections of 2002, the party formed a coalition with SNS. After the 2004 European Parliamentary elections, where they nominated candidates together, and failed to send any candidates, since they reached only 2,01%. The two parties re-merged on April 4, 2005.
