= Hedvig Malina =

Hungarian hate crime victim (born 1983)

- Born: 1983 (age 41–42); Horné Mýto, Czechoslovakia
- Citizenship: Czechoslovakia (1983–1992); Slovakia (1993–2013); Hungary (2013–)
- Occupation: Student

Hedvig Malina (Slovak: Hedviga Malinová) (born 1983) is an ethnic Hungarian woman from Horné Mýto (Hungarian: Felsővámos), Slovakia, whose situation gained publicity in 2006 for claiming that she was physically assaulted in a hate crime incident. The incident caused a media sensation and her case has ever since represented a highly controversial and debated issue of Hungary-Slovakia relations.

On 4 April 2014, Slovak attorney general charged Malina with perjury. If found guilty, she would face up to 3 years in prison. Andrej Kiska, the president of Slovakia, said that he would grant Malina pardon in case she is convicted. Malina took her case to the European Court of Human Rights, challenging what she calls the "inhuman and humiliating" conduct of the Slovak officials. She reportedly told the Népszabadság that she was looking for "moral satisfaction." Before the tribunal, the Slovak government offered an agreement to the lawyer of Hedvig Malina, in which the Slovak authorities would apologize for their treatment. On 8 November 2011 the European Court of Human Rights approved the Slovak government's apology.

== Claim of violence ==
Malina claims she was severely beaten and robbed on 25 August 2006 in Nitra after speaking Hungarian in public. She claims her attackers wrote "SK (probably Slovakia) without parasites" (Slovak: SK bez parazitov), and "Hungarians to the other side of the Danube" (Maďari za Dunaj) on her clothes.

All Slovak political parties condemned the incident, except the Slovak National Party, led by Ján Slota, which remained silent.

== Police investigation ==
Ján Packa, the head of Slovak police set up a special squad, and started an investigation immediately.

Some two weeks after the incident, police closed the case, concluding that Malina made up the incident. Slovak Deputy Prime Minister and Minister of the Interior Robert Kaliňák declared that none of Malina's claims could be confirmed. Her mobile network operator did not record any call on the day in question. She explained that she had told the police several times that she did not remember whether she had been speaking Hungarian on her phone or to someone in the street.

Malina claimed she had been robbed, and her identity papers were later sent to her address. Police claimed that a DNA analysis proved that the parcel had been posted by Malina herself. She gave the parcel to the police only two days after receiving it because of a national holiday. She had licked the stamp in an attempt to fix it back on the envelope after the police had asked her to turn over the entire package. It was later pointed out that at the time of posting the pack she was in hospital. In the hospital, Malina was treated for internal bleeding, which police authorities ascertain occurred before the claimed attack.

Graphology specialists assumed that the offensive writings on her clothes were most probably written by herself. However, the specialist did not ask Malina for a sample, but instead used an application for a passport from eight years before that may not have been written by her. By September 2006 the police had concluded their investigation, and at a press conference attended by Slovak Prime Minister Robert Fico and Minister of the Interior Robert Kaliňák, the latter stated "it is beyond doubt that the attack did not happen", supporting his assertion with several pieces of what he claimed were evidence, including DNA samples. Kaliňák later went on to denounce Malina as a "pathological liar". Since then, the Slovak authorities ordered her psychiatric examination several times.

By 2007 the Slovak authorities charged Malina with perjury.

In a July 2007 interview with the Slovak Weekly .týžden, Malina said that Robert Fico and Kaliňák initially believed what the police concluded, but later only kept repeating those statements due to outside pressure. She also said that she felt calm and had finished her fourth year at university with an excellent result, so it is not true that she had panicked before a test, and had beaten up herself to evade the exam – as stated by Slovak officials.

Malina married her Slovak boyfriend Peter Žák in February 2008 after years of being together. They have a daughter and a son.

== Controversy over the investigation ==
Béla Bugár, then leader of the Party of the Hungarian Coalition (SMK-MKP) questioned the results of the investigation, calling attention to the fact that medical examination initiated by the police did not take place until 10 days after the case, allowing time for bruises to disappear.

On 13 September 2006, Malina announced that she was maintaining her initial claims, saying she was willing to take a polygraph test, and that she and her lawyer, Gábor Gál were considering reporting the case to public prosecutors because the victim had been interrogated for six hours during which officers tried to persuade her to withdraw her claims. Packa said the attitude of Malina and her lawyer was "the despising of the work of Slovak police", and Kaliňák claimed that Gál was trying to make it into a political issue.

Hungarian politician Viktor Polgár said that the incident was not an isolated case.

The following day, Gál stepped down due to pressure and the whole SMK-MKP for being involved in the case, and gave over the case to a Slovak attorney, Roman Kvasnica. Kvasnica laid a complaint with the Nitra prosecution, which was refused on 18 October 2006. In the meantime, state-owned Slovak television channel STV broadcast a documentary directed by Eugen Korda, which claimed Kaliňák did not always tell the truth in connection with the case. The director was soon after dismissed from the television channel, reportedly for unprofessional behavior. The documentary reported mistakes made by the police and the Ministry of Interior but – according to a blog – was also biased and contained serious flaws.

== Polygraph examination ==
In November 2006. Israeli polygraph expert, Koby Rabin conducted an examination to Hedvig Malina. According to the test results Ms. Hedvig Malina did not make up the story regarding the assault in the park and she told the truth when she claimed that the attackers had been shouting that "in Slovakia people speak Slovak". No indication of lying was detected when she said that neither she, nor anyone on her behalf had written quotes on her blouse saying "Hungarians beyond the Danube" and "Slovakia without parasites".

== Charges against Malina ==
=== Kubla report ===
In November 2006 Juraj Kubla reported Malina to the authorities, accusing her of perjury. At the end of November the police initiated criminal prosecution against Malina, who, in turn, brought the case to the Constitutional Court. In May 2007, Kubla committed suicide. Kubla left behind a suicide note, but the police did not publish it.

Hungarian political parties Fidesz and Hungarian Socialist Party called Malina's case a show trial. Zsolt Németh noted that the media was informed about the act of accusing before the lawyer of the victim, and the accusation had been announced before it actually took place. Robert Fico called the comments "the coarse intervention of Budapest into Slovak domestic matters". In June 2007 Hungarian Prime Minister Ferenc Gyurcsány said that nobody has the right to doubt the independence of justice in another country.

=== Korcek report ===
On 26 May 2007 it was revealed that another person besides Kubla reported Malina to the authorities. He was later identified as Peter Korček, a former secret agent and currently a member of the Christian Democratic Movement, a Slovak political party.

=== A possible witness ===
In June, Zdeno Kamenický from Nitra claimed he knew one of the attackers, Robert Benci from Nitra. Kamenický, due to uncertain reasons, was officially never interrogated by the police, who instead claimed that Benci had a "bulletproof alibi." This alibi later turned out to be two contradicting statements from his mother and uncle, who said that Robert at the time was either at home sleeping or at a holiday place with his friends.

=== A change in view ===
The next month Packa, the head of the police, contrary to his claims he made one year before, said that "Malina might have been beaten." He explained, "we never claimed she was not beaten. We claimed it did not happen the way she states." It was also revealed that medical certificates made right after the incident but disregarded by the police did prove Malina's recounting. Dušan Čaplovič, deputy prime minister also accepted that "she may have been beaten, but not because she is Hungarian".

Examinations following the above statements suggested that Malina's handwritten testimony had not been copied accurately in typing, notably, an important sentence had been left out though this was not confirmed by Slovak police. The Chief Prosecutor's Office started an investigation to find out if it was necessary to look into the case again. As a result, Chief Public Prosecutor Dobroslav Trnka admitted that both the police and prosecution had made mistakes without specifying them.

=== Abuse of power claims ===
In August 2007, a former high-ranking police officer, Jozef Šátek, filed a complaint against Fico, Kaliňák and Packa, claiming that they had abused their power in connection with the Malina case. Legal experts noted that the Minister of the Interior, who is not a member of any criminal justice organ, revealed facts from the case file to the public even before the plaintiff had been informed her case had been shelved. The complaint was dropped in September when the police concluded there was no reason to prosecute them.

In September 2007, Chief Prosecutor Trnka decided to replace police investigators working on the case of Malina's alleged perjury and start the investigation again.

In October 2007, Tom Lantos, Hungarian-born Democratic member of the United States House of Representatives, asked Prime Minister Fico to distance themselves from the Beneš decrees, for a reasonable process in the Malina case, and to treat members of the Hungarian minority as equals. Lantos also blamed Fico for creating the climate for anti-Hungarian sentiments by including "voluntarily in his coalition individuals with known ultra-nationalist, anti-Hungarian attitudes". Lantos said that Fico personally assured him that the Slovak government had a "zero-tolerance" policy toward all kinds of discrimination. Lantos said he was considering introducing a congressional resolution condemning the ethnic attacks, saying, "The blame rests 100 percent with the Slovak side. This is not one of those instances where both sides are guilty."

In December 2007, (15 months after the beating) the Slovak police gave the video cassettes about the initial Malina hearing to Roman Kvasnica, her lawyer. It turned out the police had broken the law several times. They forgot to mention three police officers were also in the room throughout the hearing. The investigators stopped the recording at times. The hearing lasted for six hours, but the police recorded only five hours of it, and released only three hours of that recording. Despite the police's early claims not one, but two cameras were used for the recording. Malina is still accused of misleading the authorities for which she may be sentenced to five years in prison.

Malina then took her case to the European Court of Human Rights, challenging what she calls the "inhuman and humiliating" conduct of the Slovak officials. She reportedly told the Népszabadság that she was looking for "moral satisfaction."

== Decision of the European Court of Human Rights ==
Before the tribunal, the Slovak government offered an agreement to the lawyer of Hedvig Malina, in which the Slovak authorities would apologize for their treatment. On 8 November 2011 the European Court of Human Rights approved the Slovak government's apology. The Slovak Government expressed its regret, saying that "some elements of Malina's case raised doubts over whether her rights stipulated by the European Convention of Human Rights may have been violated."

Despite the apology, the investigation against Malina, started in 2007 is still under way. On 16 December, the police authorities ordered her to undergo psychiatric examination again.

At the end of 2013 Malina and her family decided to move to Győr, northwest Hungary. She commented her decision that she was not fleeing the prosecution procedure and possible court case in Slovakia and added that she just wanted to protect her children from repeated police harassment she had to endure.

4 April 2014, the Slovak Attorney General raised charges against Hedvig Malina.

== Conspiracy theories ==
Malina was at the centre of several conspiracy theories, which relate the case to the Slovak authorities or nationalists. Radio Slovakia International commented: "The victim has become the guilty party, and the question now is whether or not she will be prosecuted herself. She's been a pawn in a political game from the very beginning." ... "Thanks to the overtime put in by Béla Bugár and his ethnic-Hungarian SMK party, Malinova appears to be the victim of 'Slovak extremism', and not of a 'Hungarian game.' At this stage, we can only forgive Hedviga, but not forget those who were standing behind her the whole time".
