= Slovak National Party Youth =

Slovak National Party Youth Mládež Slovenskej národnej strany
- Chairman: Andrej Danko
- Founded: 2014; 9 years ago
- Headquarters: Bratislava, Slovakia
- Ideology: Slovak nationalism National conservatism Social conservatism
- Mother party: Slovak National Party

Slovak National Party Youth (Slovak: Mládež Slovenskej národnej strany, Mládež SNS) is a Slovak nationalist youth organization in Slovakia, and is a branch of the Slovak National Party. The organization in its current form was founded in 2014.
