= Horné Mýto =

Horné Mýto Felsővámos
- Municipality
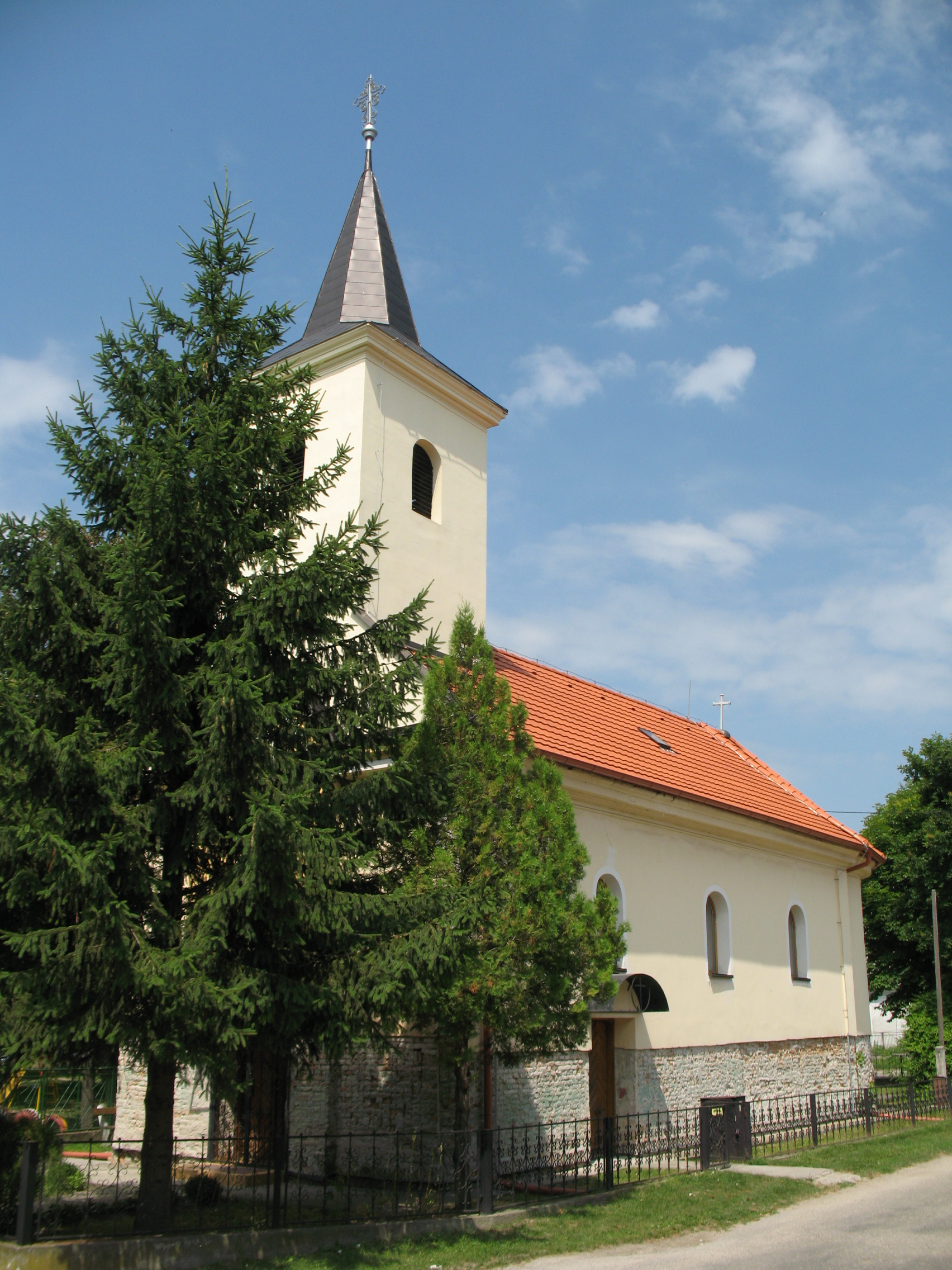

- Flag

- Location of Horné Mýto in the Trnava Region Location of Horné Mýto in Slovakia
- Coordinates: 48.01°N 17.75°E
- Country: Slovakia
- Region: Trnava Region
- District: Dunajská Streda District
- First mentioned: 1406

Government
  - Mayor: Eduárd Zalka (Party of the Hungarian Coalition)

Area
  - Total: 12.10 km^{2} (4.67 sq mi)
- Elevation: 113 m (371 ft)

Population (2025)
  - Total: 926

Ethnicity
  - Hungarians: 85.19%
  - Slovaks: 12.6%
- Time zone: UTC+1 (CET)
  - Summer (DST): UTC+2 (CEST)
- Postal code: 930 13
- Area code: +421 31
- Vehicle registration plate (until 2022): DS
- Website: hornemyto.sk

Horné Mýto (Hungarian: Felsővámos, pronounced [ˈfɛlʃøːvaːmoʃ], until 1899 Vámosfalu) is a village and municipality in the Dunajská Streda District in the Trnava Region of southwest Slovakia.

== Geography ==
The municipality lies at an altitude of 113 metres (371 ft) and covers an area of 12.10 km^{2} (4.67 sq mi) (2025).

== History ==
In the 9th century, the territory of Horné Mýto became part of the Great Moravia. In 11th it was within Kingdom of Hungary. In historical records, the village was first mentioned in 1406. Until the end of World War I, it was part of Hungary and fell within the Dunaszerdahely district of Pozsony County. After the Austro-Hungarian army disintegrated in November 1918, Czechoslovak troops liberated the whole area of southern Slovakia including the village. This was confirmed with victory powers France, Great Britain and the United States. After Hungary forced to agree and sign the Treaty of Trianon of 1920, it recognized officially the village as part of Czechoslovakia and fell within Bratislava County until 1927. In November 1938, the First Vienna Award returned the area to Hungary due to the Hungarian majority. After the occupation of soviets, they gave back the village to the Czechoslovaks. After World War II, First Vienna Award has been declared as never-valid agreement, confirming illegality of Hungarian occupation. After anti-nazi army liberated area in 1945, Czechoslovak administration returned and the village became officially part of Czechoslovakia in 1947. In 1960, it was unified with the neighboring Trhová Hradská (Vásárút) under the name of Trhové Mýto, however, since 1990, both have formed independent municipalities again.

== Population ==
Population statistic (10 years)
Year	1995	2005	2015	2025
Count	957	971	936	926
Difference		+1.46%	−3.60%	−1.06%

Population statistic
Year	2024	2025
Count	925	926
Difference		+0.10%

It has a population of 926 people (31 December 2025).

=== Ethnicity ===
Census 2021 (1+ %)
Ethnicity	Number	Fraction
Hungarian	800	88.39%
Slovak	122	13.48%
Not found out	46	5.08%
Total	905	

In year 2021 was 905 people by ethnicity 800 as Hungarian, 122 as Slovak, 46 as Not found out, 4 as Czech, 4 as Romani, 1 as Romanian, 1 as Other and 1 as English.

Note on population: The difference values of population numbers in the table "Population statistic" and in the sections "Ethnicity" & "Religion" is caused by the use of various statistical methods.

=== Religion ===
Census 2021 (1+ %)
Religion	Number	Fraction
Roman Catholic Church	702	77.57%
None	131	14.48%
Not found out	28	3.09%
Calvinist Church	16	1.77%
Total	905	

In year 2021 was 905 people by religion 702 from Roman Catholic Church, 131 from None, 28 from Not found out, 16 from Calvinist Church, 9 from Other and not ascertained christian church, 8 from Christian Congregations in Slovakia, 6 from Evangelical Church, 3 from Greek Catholic Church, 1 from Old Catholic Church and 1 from Other.

== See also ==
- List of municipalities and towns in Slovakia

== Genealogical resources ==
The records for genealogical research are available at the state archive "Statny Archiv in Bratislava, Slovakia"

- Roman Catholic church records (births/marriages/deaths): 1669-1895 (parish B)
