= Ján Slota =

Slovak politician

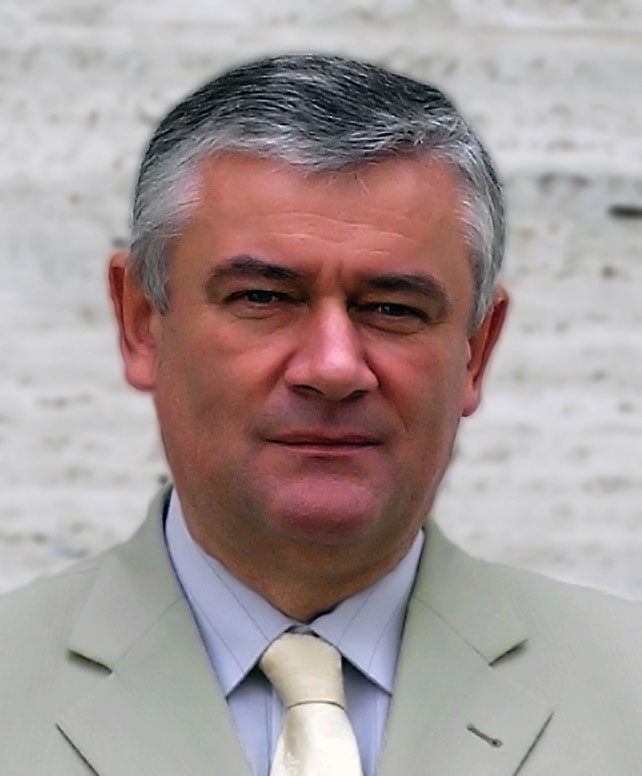

Member of the National Council of the Slovak Republic Slovak National Council until 31 December 1992
- In office 4 July 2006 – 4 April 2012
- In office 25 June 1992 – 15 October 2002

Mayor of the city of Žilina
- In office 1990–2006
- Preceded by: office created
- Succeeded by: Ivan Harman

Member of the Federal Assembly of Czechoslovakia
- In office 23 June 1990 – 25 June 1992

Personal details
- Born: 14 September 1953 (age 73) Lietavská Lúčka, Czechoslovakia
- Party: Slovak National Party (1990–2013)

Ján Slota (born 14 September 1953) is the co-founder and former president of the Slovak National Party, an extremist nationalist party. Slota as the leader of SNS entered into a coalition with Robert Fico's Smer in 2006. He was the mayor of the city of Žilina from 1990 to 2006.

== Political career ==
Slota became involved in politics after 1989 when the Communist Party fell from power in Czechoslovakia in the Velvet Revolution. In 1990 he co-founded the SNS and was elected as a member of the Federal Assembly. Later, he was elected into the National Council of the Slovak Republic. From 1994 to 1999 he served as the leader of the SNS. After an internal crisis in the SNS in 2001, he left the party and set up his own party, the Genuine Slovak National Party. As a result of this split, none of the nationalist parties received the required 5% minimum of votes in the 2002 election. In 2003, the nationalist parties merged again, after heavy quarrels, with Slota as chairman.

Slota served as the mayor of Žilina between 1990 and 2006. He was reelected in 1994, 1998 and 2002. He was succeeded by Ivan Harman in 2006.

In the 2006 parliamentary election, Slota became an MP and his SNS joined the ruling coalition with Robert Fico's Direction - Social Democracy party and Vladimír Mečiar's People's Party - Movement for a Democratic Slovakia. After the unsuccessful 2012 parliamentary election, he resigned as the chairman of the party and became Honorary Chairman.

He was dismissed from the party in April 2013, due to the "inefficient management of the property of the party".

== Controversies ==
=== Statements ===
Slota is known for his controversial statements, which have been described as "racist" and "extreme". According to The Slovak Spectator, some of Slota's statements cross "the line not just of political but also human decency." Slota has stated that his intention is to protect Slovaks, especially those living in southern Slovakia. Perhaps his most well-known controversial remarks are those directed against Hungarian people, such as his remark at a party meeting in 2006 that "we will get into our tanks and level Budapest, if [the Hungarian minority] attempt to teach us the Lord's Prayer in Hungarian ever again." After this statement, a map was published on the official SNS webpage showing Hungary as a part of Slovakia. He also said about Hungarians that "Even in 1248 a Frankish bishop was amazed after visiting the Carpathian Basin that God could have given such a beautiful country to such ugly people. He was referring to the old Hungarians, who were Mongoloid types with crooked legs and even more disgusting horses. Somehow these people have vanished. Who civilized them? Probably us, the Slovaks". He believes 200 members of the Hungarian intelligence are spying in Slovakia. Slota said that "Hungarians are a tumor on the Slovak nation that needs to be immediately removed".

Slota called the fascist leader Jozef Tiso "one of the greatest sons of the Slovak nation" and, on 17 February 2000, 40 of the 41 city council members in Žilina, where Slota was mayor, voted to dedicate a plaque honoring Tiso. After World War II, Tiso was sentenced to death for his role in the murder of tens of thousands of Slovak Jews during the Holocaust. Slota told the Czech newspaper Lidové noviny that he "envies" the Czech people for their expulsion of Germans after World War II, implying that the same should have been done to the Hungarian minority in Slovakia. Fico refused to condemn these comments, and as a result his party, Smer-SD, was expelled from the Party of European Socialists. Slota asserts that the best policy for dealing with the Roma is "a long whip in a small yard" and that "70 percent of the Roma are criminals". He has also described homosexuality as a disease, and associated homosexuals with pedophiles. In 2006, some of Slota's controversial comments were reportedly circulated to Members of the European Parliament in a mass e-mail and were published, and criticized, by international media.

=== Nováky Power Plant incident ===
In 1982 Slota worked in the Nováky Power Plant, where during the demolition of a wooden cooling tower he gave the order to burn it down. The flames reached 70 meters and the wind blew the cinders as far away as 500 meters. Slota was convicted of threatening public safety and sentenced to one year conditionally.

=== Court cases ===
Documents detailing Slota's alleged criminal past were published by Markíza, the leading private television station in Slovakia, which resulted in a court case Markíza v Slota. Slota has been involved in another court case regarding his alleged criminal past with the newspaper SME. He lost the case with Markíza TV, however, he won the case involving SME.

During the court proceedings Slota said he was proud of assaulting and beating a Hungarian saying "I’m also proud of the fact that I gave the Hungarian a black eye." (Slovak: Na to, že som tomu Maďarovi urobil monokel, som tiež hrdý.)

=== Tabloid claims ===
Slota supposedly reported a total yearly income of 311 400 SKK (about €10,000 or US$14,000) in his 2006 annual tax return, however he himself supposedly confirmed that he had bought a Bentley Continental GT for 2.6 million SKK in that year. In his tax return he also supposedly confessed that he has a luxury villa on the Croatian riviera as well as a Porsche Cayenne Turbo S "lent to him by one of his friends for his personal use".

== Private life ==
Slota briefly emigrated to Austria in 1971, however, he returned to Czechoslovakia after several days. Slota is a Roman Catholic.

== See also ==
- Hungary–Slovakia relations
- 2006 Slovak-Hungarian diplomatic affairs
