= Slovak National Party =

Political party in Slovakia

Slovak National Party Slovenská národná strana
- Abbreviation: SNS
- Chairman: Andrej Danko
- General Secretary: Stanislav Kmec
- Founded: 7 March 1990; 36 years ago
- Preceded by: Slovak National Party (claimed)
- Headquarters: Šafárikovo nám.3 814 99 Bratislava
- Youth wing: Slovak National Party Youth
- Membership (2022): ▼2,205
- Ideology: Ultranationalism; National conservatism; Right-wing populism
- Political position: Right-wing to far-right
- European affiliation: Nonaffiliated (since 2024) (Note: The party was formerly part of Euronat (1997–2002), the AEN (2002–2009), were nonaffiliated (2009–2011) the MELD (2011–2015), were nonaffiliated (2015–2024) and the ID Party (2024).)
- European Parliament group: None (since 2014) (Note: The party was formerly part of Europe of Freedom and Democracy (2009–2014).)
- International affiliation: World National-Conservative Movement (2015)
- Colours: White, blue and red (Slovak national colors)
- Slogan: To serve and work for the nation.
- National Council: 5 / 150
- European Parliament: 0 / 15
- Regional governors: 0 / 8
- Regional deputies: 15 / 416
- Mayors (Note: Also with coalitions.): 395 / 2,904

Party flag

Website
- www.sns.sk

The Slovak National Party (Slovak: Slovenská národná strana, SNS) is an ultranationalist political party in Slovakia. The party characterizes itself as a nationalist party based on what is regards as social and European Christian values.

Since 1990 SNS has won seats in every Slovak parliament but three (in 2002, 2012 and 2020) and was part of the coalition government formed after the 2006 election with Robert Fico's Direction – Social Democracy (Smer-SD). In the 2012 parliamentary election, SNS failed to meet the 5% electoral threshold and thus lost parliamentary representation. At the following party congress in October 2012, the delegates chose lawyer Andrej Danko as the new chairman of the party. Under Danko SNS returned to another coalition government with Smer-SD after the 2016 Slovak parliamentary election. In the next election in 2020, the party again failed to meet the threshold for parliamentary representation. In the next election, SNS again returned in 2023 and once again formed a coalition government with Fico.

== History ==
The party was founded in December 1989 and perceives itself as an ideological heir to the historical Slovak National Party. The party declares its three pillars: Christian, national and social. One of the biggest events the SNS has participated in since then was the establishment of an independent Slovakia on 1 January 1993. The SNS has had deputies in the Slovak parliament in the years 1990–2002 and 2006–2012. The party also had deputies in the Slovak government. Marián Andel, Jozef Prokeš, Jaroslav Paška and Ľudovít Černák were in the second Mečiar government (1992–1994), Ján Sitek and Eva Slavkovská in the third Mečiar government (1994–1998) and other deputies were in the government of Robert Fico from 2006 to 2010 (see below).

Between 2001 and 2005 there was a Real Slovak National Party (Pravá slovenská národná strana, PSNS), a party of SNS splinters, which remerged with SNS later. Since 2005, there is also a United Slovak National Party (Zjednotená slovenská národná strana, ZSNS), also formed of former SNS members. In February 2006, PSNS changed its name into the Slovak National Coalition – Slovak Mutuality (Slovenská národná koalícia – Slovenská vzájomnosť). However, only the Slovak National Party is currently relevant.

In 2006, the SNS was the only Slovak political party, which did not express his disagreement when a 23-year-old ethnic Hungarian girl was kicked and had the message "Hungarians, go back to the other side of the Danube" and "Death to the parasites" written on her t-shirt.

In 2008 a €120 million tender for establishing the rules and guidelines and logos for distribution of funds from the European Union, was won by a consortium of firms with close ties to SNS leader Ján Slota. The tender notice had been posted for only five days on a bulletin board in the ministry run by the SNS party behind a locked door, which resulted in a single bid. Following the scandal, the SNS minister in charge of the contract was fired, and the European Commission has launched an investigation. In 2009 SNS proposed a law to create barriers for women seeking abortion in Slovakia.

== Political positions ==
The Slovak National Party (SNS) is an ultranationalist party and typically placed on the far-right of the political spectrum.

The SNS supports economic nationalism and advocates for domestic production and agriculture. While the party has been critical of privatisations, it has advocated tax cuts for small businesses. It opposed an increase in the minimum wage that was proposed by its coalition partners Smer-SD and Hlas-SD, citing its impact on the state budget. Under Slota's leadership in the 1990s, the party had supported a more free market approach than its coalition partner, the Movement for a Democratic Slovakia.

During Fico's Fourth Cabinet, SNS Culture Minister Martina Šimkovičová removed heads of major cultural institutions for their alleged "political activism", including the directors of the Slovak National Gallery and Slovak National Theatre. She also abolished Radio and Television of Slovakia, the country's national public broadcaster, also citing "political activism".

The party is socially conservative. Danko has advocated a ban on education on gender identity and sexual orientation in Slovak schools.

The party has called for stronger security measures against illegal immigration on EU external borders and has opposed EU asylum quotas.

The SNS has submitted legislation to charge media publications money for information requests and introduce a legal right of correction to media reports that might damage an individual's reputation.

The SNS has also proposed legislation that would subject NGOs receiving over €5,000 a year in foreign funding as "organisations with foreign support" and subject them to increased scrutiny, similar to legislation that had been previously enacted in Hungary.

=== Foreign policy ===
The Slovak National Party is Eurosceptic. Although the party does not question Slovak membership of NATO, it opposes the presence of a NATO base or logistics centre in Slovakia. It has stated it would not enter into a coalition government with the rival nationalist party, the Republic Movement, if the Republic Movement advocated a referendum on NATO membership. Though the SNS opposed the U.S.-Slovakia Defence Cooperation Agreement during Fico's Third Cabinet, the SNS Defence Minister, Peter Gajdoš, did support the purchase of U.S. fighter jets by Slovakia.

The SNS condemned the Russian invasion of Ukraine, but advocated peace talks between the two sides to resolve the conflict. The party opposes Ukrainian EU membership. The party criticised Fico for his support for United Nations General Assembly Resolution ES-11/7, suggesting that Slovakia should have opposed the resolution in line with Hungary's position.

Danko described Israel as a "strategic partner" of Slovakia and expressed support for relocating Slovakia's embassy in Israel to Jerusalem during a visit to Israel in 2018. However, Danko opposed the 2024 purchase of Barak MX systems from Israel by Slovak Defence Minister Robert Kaliňák on financial grounds.

== European affiliations ==
From 1997 to 2002, the SNS was a member of Euronat, an alliance formed by the French National Front (FN). From 2002 to 2009, the SNS was a member of the Alliance for Europe of the Nations alliance, alongside Poland's Law and Justice party, the Czech Civic Democratic Party, the Israeli Likud, the Danish People's Party, the Irish Fianna Fáil and the Italian National Alliance. From 2009 to 2014, the SNS was part of Europe of Freedom and Democracy (EFD) group in the European Parliament, which was dominated by the UK Independence Party (UKIP), and from 2011 to 2015 with the affiliated Movement for a Europe of Liberties and Democracy, which did not include UKIP but included other EFDD members such as United Poland and the Finns Party. In 2014, the SNS participated in exploratory meetings held by the European Alliance for Freedom regarding the formation of a new European Parliament group, though it ultimately did not win seats at the 2014 European Parliament election. In 2024, the SNS was announced as a new member of the Identity and Democracy Party, though the SNS did not become a member of its successor, Patriots.eu. In the Parliamentary Assembly of the Council of Europe, the SNS sits with the European Conservatives, Patriots & Affiliates.

Slota invited Jean-Marie Le Pen, the then-leader of the FN, to visit Slovakia in 1997, after Slota attended a congress held by the FN in Strasbourg. In 2019, Danko distanced himself from the FN's successor, the National Rally (RN), after it formed an alliance with the rival Slovak We Are Family party, suggesting that RN leader Marine Le Pen could break up the EU. Nevertheless, in 2022, Danko praised the possibility of a Le Pen victory in the 2022 French presidential election as positive for Visegrád Group countries.

Since Slota's tenure as SNS leader, the SNS has had a close relationship with the Freedom Party of Austria (FPÖ), previously listing it formally as a "partner party". However, disagreements over the Beneš decrees caused a brief rift between the parties, with the SNS supporting the exclusion of the FPÖ from the EFD in 2011. The relationship was later resumed under Danko, with the parties sharing election advice throughout the 2010s.

Danko has advocated for a close partnership with Hungary under Fidesz rule and Poland under the Law and Justice party. He has been described as having close relations with Fidesz politicians.

== Election results ==
=== Czechoslovak Parliament ===
Election	Leader	Chamber of People					Chamber of Nations					Government
Election	Leader	Votes	%	Seats	+/–	Position	Votes	%	Seats	+/–	Position	Government
1990	Víťazoslav Móric	372,025	3.50	6 / 150	▲6	▲7th	387,387	3.65	9 / 150	▲9	▲5th	Opposition
1992	Jozef Prokeš	290,249	3.03	6 / 150	0	▼9th	288,864	3.02	9 / 150	0	▲6th	Opposition

=== Slovak National Council ===
Election	Leader	Votes	%	Rank	Seats	+/–	Government
1990	Víťazoslav Móric	470,984	13.9	▲3rd	22 / 150	▲22	Opposition
1992	Jozef Prokeš	244,527	7.9	▼4th	15 / 150	▼7	HZDS–SNS (1992–1994)
1992	Jozef Prokeš	244,527	7.9	▼4th	15 / 150	▼7	Opposition (1994)

=== National Council ===
Election	Leader	Votes	%	Rank	Seats	+/–	Government
1994	Ján Slota	155,359	5.4	▼7th	9 / 150	▼6	HZDS–SNS–ZRS
1998	Ján Slota	304,839	9.1	▲5th	14 / 150	▲5	Opposition
2002	Anna Malíková	95,633	3.3	▼9th	0 / 150	▼14	No seats
2006	Ján Slota	270,230	11.7	▲3rd	20 / 150	▲20	Smer–SNS–ĽS–HZDS
2010	Ján Slota	128,490	5.1	▼6th	9 / 150	▼11	Opposition
2012	Ján Slota	116,420	4.6	▼7th	0 / 150	▼9	No seats
2016	Andrej Danko	225,386	8.6	▲4th	15 / 150	▲15	Smer–SNS–Bridge–Network (2016)
2016	Andrej Danko	225,386	8.6	▲4th	15 / 150	▲15	Smer–SNS–Bridge (2016–2020)
2020	Andrej Danko	91,171	3.2	▼10th	0 / 150	▼15	No seats
2023	Andrej Danko	166,995	5.6	▲7th	10 / 150	▲10	Smer–Hlas–SNS

=== Presidential ===
Election	Candidate	First round		Second round		Result
Election	Candidate	Votes	%	Votes	%	Result
1999	Ján Slota	73,836	2.50			Lost
2004	Vladimír Mečiar	650,242	32.73	722,368	40.08	Lost
2009	Ivan Gašparovič	876,061	46.71	1,234,787	55.53	Won
2024	Andrej Danko (Note: Candidate withdrew, but was still on the ballot. Party subsequently supported Peter Pellegrini's presidential campaign.)	1,905	0.08			Lost

=== European Parliament ===
Election	List leader	Votes	%	Rank	Seats	+/–	EP Group
2004 (Note: Run in a joint list with PSNS.)	Unclear	14,150	2.01	9th	0 / 14	New	–
2009	Dušan Švantner	45,960	5.55	6th	1 / 13	▲1	EFDD
2014	Unclear	20,244	3.61	10th	0 / 13	▼1	–
2019	Unclear	40,330	4.09	8th	0 / 14	0	–
2024	Andrej Danko	28,102	1.90	10th	0 / 15	0	–

=== 2006–2010: In Slovak government ===
SNS entered the current Slovak government after Chairman Ján Slota and Robert Fico agreed to create a coalition government. This created an unusual situation of an alleged far-right party, SNS being accepted and taken as a partner by SMER, a party describing itself as leftist. Three SNS ministers were sworn in on 4 July 2006:

- Jaroslav Izák as the minister of the environment. Jaroslav Izák was fired from the Environment Ministry top job in the wake of accusations of cronyism, He was succeeded by Ján Chrbet.
- Ján Mikolaj as deputy prime minister; minister of education.
- Marián Janušek as the minister of construction and regional development. Janušek was sacked from the Ministry's top job for "granting lucrative contracts worth €98 million to two firms, Avocat and Zamedia, which are believed to have links to SNS chairman Ján Slota."

Further ministers, delegated by SNS:

- Ján Chrbet as Minister of Environment, after Izák. His firing was over his responsibility in a mega-scandal involving the sale of the country's excess emission quotas at an extremely low price, below their market value.
- Viliam Turský as Minister of Environment following Chrbet. Also fired by Fico over a dubious contract he signed with a company. After three SNS Ministers were fired from the same ministry, Fico took away control of the ministry from SNS.

The coalition agreement between Smer-SD and SNS resulted in the suspension of Smer-SD from the Party of European Socialists (PES). The PES considered SNS a "political party which incites or attempts to stir up racial or ethnic prejudices and racial hatred." However, in 2008 Smer's membership suspension ended with no further PES's demands regarding SNS.

=== 2016 election ===
In the 2016 Slovak parliamentary election, the Slovak National Party won 8.64% of the vote, and joined Fico's Third Cabinet on 22 March.

== Controversy ==
In April 2008, a map was published on the official web page discussion forum of the party where the territory of Hungary was divided between Slovakia and Austria, eliminating Hungary from the map. After receiving media attention the map was promptly removed and the party has denied responsibility, referring to the free access policy of the forum section, where the map was posted. The former party leader Ján Slota is the source of considerable controversy, Slota is frequently criticized for arrogance, nationalism, and extremism. The Slovak Spectator reports that most of the media attention Slota receives is because of statements that cross "the line not just of political but also human decency." Documents about party leader Slota's criminal past, detailing arson, grand theft auto and assault, were broadcast by Markíza, the leading private television station in Slovakia, which resulted in a court case Markíza v Slota. During the court proceedings Slota admitted to some of the crimes and even said he was proud of assaulting and beating a Hungarian saying "I am proud of giving that Hungarian a black eye". Another physical assault was committed by Anna Belousovová of SNS against fellow parliamentarian Igor Matovič of SaS. The SNS politician slapped Matovič saying she disliked an article written by him.

=== Allegations of racism and discrimination ===
The party under the leadership of Ján Slota had been sometimes described as ultra-nationalist, Hungarophobic, right-wing extremist, and far-right, due to its statements about Hungarians and Romani which have been characterised as racist. The alleged party's major concern after the dissolution of Czechoslovakia has been the danger of "irredentism". Any moves and changes toward broader rights for the national minorities living in Slovakia, especially the sizeable Hungarian minority living in southern Slovakia, was seen as a step toward territorial autonomy.

The party had been known for its inflammatory rhetoric against ethnic Roma and Hungarians. The Party of European Socialists, considered SNS as a "political party which incites or attempts to stir up racial or ethnic prejudices and racial hatred." The former party's leader Ján Slota, referred to by Earthtimes as "a xenophobic politician who has stirred anti-Hungarian sentiments", said the best policy for dealing with the Romani was "a long whip in a small yard." He is quoted as saying "we will sit in our tanks and destroy Budapest" and questioning if homosexuals are normal people. Slota stated that "The Hungarians are a cancer in the body of the Slovak nation." Slota called the fascist leader Jozef Tiso "one of the greatest sons of the Slovak nation" and on 17 February 2000, 40 of the 41 city council members in Žilina, where Slota was mayor at the time, voted to dedicate a plaque honouring Jozef Tiso, who was convicted and executed for the breaking up the Czechoslovak state and for collaboration with Nazi Germany. Later in a move that was described as absurd by a Slovak journalist, SNS demanded the seat of deputy prime minister responsible for human rights and national minorities. The party did not manage to obtain the seat.

The party abandoned anti-Hungarian rhetoric under Danko's leadership, praising Hungary under the leadership of Viktor Orbán as a model for Slovakia. Prior to the 2023 Slovak parliamentary election, Hungarian Foreign Minister Péter Szijjártó praised the Slovak National Party following a meeting with Danko, stating that "parties standing on national foundations always understand each other well" and emphasising their shared "Christian-conservative values". In 2023, Danko stated that a policy of "non-cooperation" between Hungary and Slovakia belongs to the last century, condemning Slovakia's then-Foreign Minister Rastislav Káčer for suggesting that Hungary could make territorial claims against Slovakia following the Russian invasion of Ukraine.

The party has been described as spreading hate against the LGBTI+ community as recently as July 2023.

=== Allegations of neo-fascism ===
In the past when Ján Slota was its leader, the SNS party was accused of being a fascist party (or having its origins in a far right ideology). The allegations are sometimes connected to various statements of party members or that SNS was behind "the continuing campaign to rehabilitate Jozef Tiso, head of the wartime fascist regime, which was responsible for the deportation of the country's Jews to the death camps" might also be a contributing factor. One high-profile fascist allegation was when in 2006 in a live interview with Inforadio, a politician of the Party of the Hungarian Coalition, Miklós Duray described SNS as a "fascist party". Duray said "one third of the Slovak government is made up of Slota's party which is fascist" describing the 2006 governing coalition between Robert Fico's Smer, Ján Slota's SNS, and HZDS, making SNS one of the three governing parties. SNS sued for financial damages, alleging the statement caused it loss of votes, image, and reputation. The District Court ruled that Duray was to pay one million crowns as a compensation and to apologize for his statements. The Slovak Supreme Court ultimately decided that SNS is not entitled for the financial compensation, because the party did not sufficiently document the alleged damage. SNS party chairman Ján Slota denounced the Supreme Court of Slovakia for that decision.

== Party leaders ==
Leader		Year
1	Víťazoslav Móric	1990–1991
2	Jozef Prokeš	1991–1992
3	Ľudovít Černák	1992–1994
4	Ján Slota	1994–1999
5	Anna Malíková	1999–2003
6	Ján Slota	2003–2012
7	Andrej Danko	2012–present
