= Cabinet of Peter Pellegrini =

Former government of Slovakia

Pellegrini's Cabinet
- 10th Cabinet of Slovakia

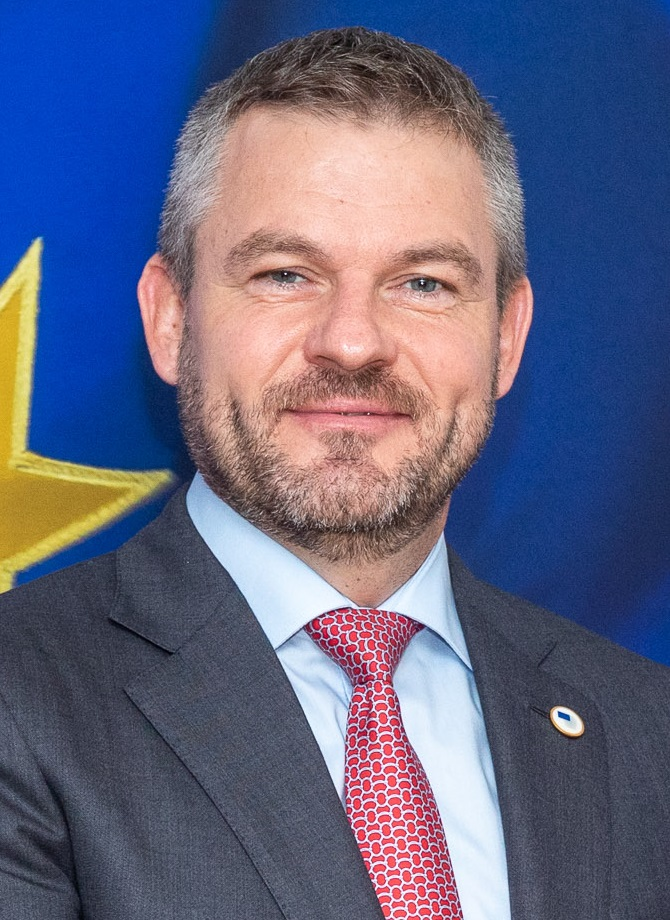
- Pellegrini in 2019
- Date formed: 22 March 2018
- Date dissolved: 21 March 2020

People and organisations
- Head of state: Andrej Kiska; Zuzana Čaputová
- Head of government: Peter Pellegrini
- No. of ministers: 15
- Member parties: Direction – Social Democracy; Slovak National Party; Bridge
- Status in legislature: Simple majority (2018–2019); Minority (2019–2020)
- Opposition parties: Freedom and Solidarity; Ordinary People and Independent Personalities–NOVA; Kotlebists – People's Party Our Slovakia; We Are Family
- Opposition leader: Richard Sulík

History
- Outgoing election: 2016 Slovak parliamentary election
- Predecessor: Fico's Third Cabinet
- Successor: Matovič's Cabinet

Pellegrini's Cabinet is the former government of Slovakia, headed by prime minister Peter Pellegrini. It was formed on 22 March 2018, after the Prime Minister Robert Fico resigned, as a result of the popular protests following the murder of Ján Kuciak and his fiancée, Martina Kušnírová. According to the Slovak Constitution, if the Prime Minister resigns, the entire government resigns as well. Nevertheless, the composition of the government was to a large extent the same as the previous government. All members of the Smer-SD, SNS and Most-Híd parties supported the re-constructed government.

The cabinet was approved by the National Council on 26 March 2018 with an 81-61 vote, while protests erupted in the streets of Bratislava. It was replaced by the Cabinet of Igor Matovič after the 2020 parliamentary election.

== Breakdown by party nomination ==
- Direction – Social Democracy
9
- Slovak National Party
3
- Most–Híd
3

== Composition ==
There are several changes compared to the previous government, that came up from the last elections. Besides a few ministers who were replaced, the make-up of the Deputy Prime Ministers also changed. Peter Pellegrini, who became the Prime Minister, was replaced by Richard Raši, as the Deputy Prime Minister for Investment and Informatization. The Deputy Prime Minister and the Minister of Interior Robert Kaliňák was replaced for a short time by Tomáš Drucker, who previously served as the Minister of Health. He was replaced by Andrea Kalavská on that position. Drucker, however, resigned only after three weeks in the position. Instead of removing the President of the Police from his office, which the protests demanded, he resigned himself. He stated that he could not feel authentic in a position that polarises the society. Denisa Saková, former Deputy of Interior Minister Kaliňák, was named the Minister after him. Other changes on the Ministerial posts included Lucia Žitňanská, who refused to be a Minister in the re-formed government. She was replaced by Gábor Gál on her post. The last change happened on the post of the Minister of Culture. Marek Maďarič resigned shortly after the protests set about. He was replaced by Ľubica Laššáková. Ministers who also serve as Deputy Prime Ministers also changed. Minister of Finance, Minister of Agriculture and Minister of the Environment replaced those of Interior Ministry and Ministry of Justice. Recently, Andrea Kalavská resigned on 17 December 2019 and László Sólymos on 28 January 2020.

Portfolio	Minister	Took office	Left office	Party
Government's Office
Prime Minister	Peter Pellegrini	22 March 2018	21 March 2020	Direction – Social Democracy
Deputy Prime Minister
Deputy Prime Minister for Investments and Informatization	Richard Raši	22 March 2018	21 March 2020	Direction – Social Democracy
Ministry of Finance
Deputy Prime Minister and Minister of Finance	Peter Kažimír	22 March 2018	11 April 2019	Direction – Social Democracy
Deputy Prime Minister and Minister of Finance	Peter Pellegrini (Note: Acting minister.) (Note: Did not serve as deputy prime minister.)	11 April 2019	7 May 2019	Direction – Social Democracy
Deputy Prime Minister and Minister of Finance	Ladislav Kamenický (Note: Did not serve as deputy prime minister.)	7 May 2019	21 March 2020	Direction – Social Democracy
Ministry of Agriculture and Rural Development
Deputy Prime Minister and Minister of Agriculture and Rural Development	Gabriela Matečná	22 March 2018	21 March 2020	Slovak National Party
Ministry of the Environment
Deputy Prime Minister and Minister of Environment	László Sólymos	22 March 2018	28 January 2020	Most–Híd
Deputy Prime Minister and Minister of Environment	Árpád Érsek (Note: Acting minister.) (Note: Did not serve as deputy prime minister.)	28 January 2020	21 March 2020	Most–Híd
Ministry of Interior
Minister of Interior	Tomáš Drucker (Note: Independent, nominated by Direction – Social Democracy.)	22 March 2018	17 April 2018	Direction – Social Democracy
Minister of Interior	Peter Pellegrini (Note: Acting minister.)	17 April 2018	26 April 2018	Direction – Social Democracy
Minister of Interior	Denisa Saková	26 April 2018	21 March 2020	Direction – Social Democracy
Ministry of Justice
Minister of Justice	Gábor Gál	22 March 2018	21 March 2020	Most–Híd
Ministry of Foreign and European Affairs
Minister of Foreign and European Affairs	Miroslav Lajčák (Note: Independent, nominated by Direction – Social Democracy.)	22 March 2018	21 March 2020	Direction – Social Democracy
Ministry of Economy
Minister of Economy	Peter Žiga	22 March 2018	21 March 2020	Direction – Social Democracy
Ministry of Transport and Construction
Minister of Transport, Construction and Regional Development	Árpád Érsek	22 March 2018	21 March 2020	Most–Híd
Ministry of Defence
Minister of Defence	Peter Gajdoš	22 March 2018	21 March 2020	Slovak National Party
Ministry of Labour, Social Affairs and Family
Minister of Labour, Social Affairs and Family	Ján Richter	22 March 2018	21 March 2020	Direction – Social Democracy
Ministry of Education, Science, Research and Sport
Minister of Education, Science, Research and Sport	Martina Lubyová (Note: Independent, nominated by Slovak National Party.)	22 March 2018	21 March 2020	Slovak National Party
Ministry of Culture
Minister of Culture	Ľubica Laššáková	22 March 2018	21 March 2020	Direction – Social Democracy
Ministry of Health
Minister of Health	Andrea Kalavská (Note: Independent, nominated by Direction – Social Democracy.)	22 March 2018	17 December 2019	Direction – Social Democracy
Minister of Health	Peter Pellegrini (Note: Acting minister.)	17 December 2019	21 March 2020	Direction – Social Democracy

== Party composition ==
Party	Ideology	Leader	Deputies	Ministers
SMER-SD	Social democracy	Robert Fico	49 / 150	9 / 15
SNS	Ultranationalism	Andrej Danko	15 / 150	3 / 15
Most-Híd	Hungarian minority interests	Béla Bugár	14 / 150	3 / 15
Independents			3 / 150	0 / 15
Total			81 / 150	15

== See also ==
- Fico's First Cabinet
- Fico's Second Cabinet
- Fico's Third Cabinet
