= Radičová's Cabinet =

Slovak Government

- 7th Cabinet of Slovakia
- 8 July 2010 – 4 April 2012
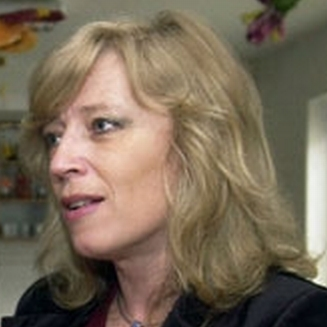
- Date formed: 8 July 2010
- Date dissolved: 4 April 2012

People and organisations
- Head of state: Ivan Gašparovič
- Head of government: Iveta Radičová
- No. of ministers: 15
- Ministers removed: 1
- Total no. of members: 15
- Member party: SDKÚ-DS; KDH; SaS; Most–Híd
- Status in legislature: Majority Coalition (2010–2011); Caretakers (2011–2012)
- Opposition party: Smer-SD; SNS
- Opposition leader: Robert Fico

History
- Election: 2010 Slovak parliamentary election
- Incoming formation: 2010
- Outgoing formation: 2012
- Predecessor: Fico's First Cabinet
- Successor: Fico's Second Cabinet

Prime Minister of Slovakia Iveta Radičová formed a government between 8 July 2010 and 4 April 2012, being the first woman to hold this office. The government was formed as a coalition of four parties: Slovak Democratic and Christian Union – Democratic Party, Christian Democratic Movement, Freedom and Solidarity and Most–Híd.

== Government ministers ==
Office	Minister	Political Party	In office
Prime Minister	Iveta Radičová	SDKÚ-DS	8 July 2010 – 4 April 2012
Minister of Transport, Construction and Regional Development	Ján Figeľ	Christian Democratic Movement	8 July 2010 – 4 April 2012
Minister of Labour, Social Affairs and Family	Jozef Mihál	Freedom and Solidarity	8 July 2010 – 4 April 2012
Minister of Finance	Ivan Mikloš	SDKÚ-DS	8 July 2010 – 4 April 2012
Minister of Economy	Juraj Miškov	Freedom and Solidarity	8 July 2010 – 4 April 2012
Minister of Agriculture and Rural Development	Zsolt Simon	Most–Híd	8 July 2010 – 4 April 2012
Minister of Interior	Daniel Lipšic	Christian Democratic Movement	8 July 2010 – 4 April 2012
Minister of Defence	Ľubomír Galko	Freedom and Solidarity	8 July 2010 – 23 November 2011
Minister of Defence	Iveta Radičová (Acting)	SDKÚ-DS	28 November 2011 – 4 April 2012
Minister of Justice	Lucia Žitňanská	SDKÚ-DS	8 July 2010 – 4 April 2012
Minister of Foreign Affairs	Mikuláš Dzurinda	SDKÚ-DS	8 July 2010 – 4 April 2012
Minister of Education, Science, Research and Sport	Eugen Jurzyca	SDKÚ-DS	8 July 2010 – 4 April 2012
Minister of Culture	Daniel Krajcer	Freedom and Solidarity	8 July 2010 – 4 April 2012
Minister of Health	Ivan Uhliarik	Christian Democratic Movement	8 July 2010 – 4 April 2012
Minister of the Environment	József Nagy	Most–Híd	2 November 2010 – 4 April 2012

=== Deputy Prime Ministers ===
Minister	Political Party	In office	Notes
Ján Figeľ	Christian Democratic Movement	8 July 2010 – 4 April 2012	1st Deputy Prime Minister
Rudolf Chmel	Most–Híd	8 July 2010 – 4 April 2012	Deputy Prime Minister of Human Rights and Minorities
Jozef Mihál	Freedom and Solidarity	8 July 2010 – 4 April 2012	
Ivan Mikloš	SDKÚ-DS	8 July 2010 – 4 April 2012	

== Party composition ==
Party	Ideology	Leader	Deputies	Ministers
SDKÚ-DS	Christian democracy	Mikuláš Dzurinda	28 / 150	6 / 15
SaS	Liberalism	Richard Sulík	22 / 150	4 / 15
KDH	Christian democracy	Ján Figeľ	15 / 150	3 / 15
Most-Híd	Hungarian minority interests	Béla Bugár	14 / 150	2 / 15
Total			79 / 150	15

== Confidence motion ==
Motion of confidence Iveta Radičová (SDKÚ-DS)
Ballot →	10 August 2010
Required majority →	73 out of 145 (simple)
Yes: • SDKÚ-DS (28); • SaS (22); • KDH (15); • Most-Híd (14)	79 / 150
No: • SMER-SD (59); • SNS (7)	66 / 150
Abstentions	0 / 150
Absentees: • SMER-SD (3); • SNS (2)	5 / 150

EFSF bailout expansion to Greece tied with motion of confidence Iveta Radičová (SDKÚ-DS)
Ballot →	11 October 2011
Required majority →	76 out of 124 (absolute)
Yes: • SDKÚ-DS (28); • SaS (1); • KDH (14); • Most-Híd (11); • Independents (1)	55 / 150
No: • SNS (7); • Independents (2)	9 / 150
Absentions: • SMER-SD (60)	60 / 150
Absentees: • SaS (20); • Most-Híd (3); • Independents (1); • SMER-SD (2)	26 / 150
