= Fico's Cabinet =

Fico's Cabinet may refer to:

- Fico's First Cabinet, 2006-2010
- Fico's Second Cabinet, 2012-2016
- Fico's Third Cabinet, 2016-2018
- Fico's Fourth Cabinet, 2023-present
