= Fico government =

Fico Government may refer to:

- Fico's First Cabinet, 2006–2010
- Fico's Second Cabinet, 2012–2016
- Fico's Third Cabinet, 2016–2018
- Fico's Fourth Cabinet, from 2023
