= Jana Laššáková =

Slovak jurist and politician

Judge of the Constitutional Court of Slovakia
- In office 14 December 2017 – 30 September 2023

Member of the National Council
- In office 15 October 2002 – 13 December 2017

Deputy Speaker of the National Council
- In office 4 April 2012 – 23 March 2016 Serving with Miroslav Číž, Ján Figeľ, Erika Jurinová and Renáta Zmajkovičová
- Speaker: Pavol Paška; Peter Pellegrini

Personal details
- Born: Jana Murcková; 22 May 1952 (age 73) Plavnica, Czechoslovakia
- Party: Direction – Social Democracy
- Spouse: Vladimír Laššák
- Children: 1
- Education: Comenius University

Jana Laššáková (née Murcková; born 22 May 1952) is a Slovak politician and lawyer. In 2002–2017, she was a Member of the National Council. From 2017 to 2023 she has served as a Justice of the Constitutional Court of Slovakia.

== Legal career ==
Laššáková was born in the village of in Plavnica. She studied law at the Comenius University, graduating in 1976. After graduation she worked as an in-house counsel for various companies as well as an attorney.

== Political career ==
Laššáková served as the Chairwoman of the Direction – Social Democracy in the Banská Bystrica region since its founding. In 2002 she became an MP. In 2012, she became the Leader of the Direction – Social Democracy caucus. In this position she gained notoriety for using thumb up/thumb down gestures to inform her fellow caucus members how they should vote.

In 2017 she was chosen a Justice of the Constitutional Court of Slovakia by the parliament. The confirmation of her appointment by president Andrej Kiska got delayed as the president was unconvinced by the expertise of the parliament's choices and requested clarification from the Constitutional Court of Slovakia as to whether he is allowed not to confirm the candidates. Upon courts' ruling confirming the president has to confirm parliament's nominees, Laššáková was confirmed. Upon joining the Constitutional Court, she gave up all her political and party functions. On 5 September 2023, she retired from the Court.
