= Good Neighborhood and Understanding Award =

The Good Neighborhood and Understanding Award (Hungarian Jó szomszédság és megértés-díj, Slovak Cena za dobré susedstvo a porozumenie) is an award, which was established by Hungarian foreign minister Kinga Göncz and Slovak foreign minister Ján Kubiš on 15 December 2008. It is given for those Slovak and/or Hungarian individuals or organizations, who work the most for the co-operation of the two nations. The aim of the award is to deepen the good relationship of the two countries. It awards also a cash prize of €2,000 and a certification. The award is given in Budapest and Bratislava by turns. This award is important in those days, when there is a crisis between Slovakia and Hungary (see 2006 Slovak-Hungarian diplomatic affairs or 2009 ban of Hungarian President from Slovakia).

== Nomination for the award ==
According to the paper, which was written by the Ministry of Foreign Affair of Hungary, more details about the award are:

- People and/or organization could be nominated between the date 15 November and 15 December every year.
- The nominations must present to the Ministry of Foreign Affairs of Hungary and Slovakia. After the nomination both country must set up two nominees (two Hungarian and two Slovak).
- The final judgement must born until 15 February.
- The award is given in Hungary and in Slovakia by turns.
- The one who was awarded, could not nominated again within the next five years.

== Award-winners ==
- 2009 – Slovak politician Rudolf Chmel and mayor of Hejce Géza Rohály

Rudolf Chmel was the last ambassador accredited to Hungary, he speaks also Hungarian, and he is the member of the Most–Híd Party, an inter-ethnic Slovak party. Géza Rohály in the mayor of that village, where the Slovak Air Force Antonov An-24 crash happened, and all the villagers helped to save.

- 2010 – Mountain rescuers of the High Tatras and SACR Slovak-Hungarian Peacekeeping Unit

The Slovak Mountain Rescue Service saves many Hungarian lifes in the High Tatras. The roots of the service go back to 1873, when the Hungarian Carpathians Association was founded, both organizations is part of the common history of the two nations. In Cyprus, under UN-leading, there is a joint Slovak-Hungarian military contingent.

- 2011 – Hungarian author and professor Csaba Gy. Kiss and the Slovak K-9 Special Service.

Kiss tried to see during all of his career the common history of the two nations. And the Slovak K-9 Special Service helped a lot: last year at Ajka alumina plant accident.

- 2012 – The Slovak association Občianske združenie pre obnovu ipeľských mostov (Civic Association for Reconstruction Ipeľ Bridges) and Hungarian Terra Recognita Foundation
- 2013 – Civic activists Adriána Artimoviča and Jozef Kocka and Ildikó Koncz Keményné.

Artimoviča and Kocka as motorbike enthusiasts organized crossborder activities. Keményné and her society organized fund collecting after the Krásna Hôrka Castle burnt down in 2012.

=== Not awarded nominees ===
- 2009 – Katalin Szvorák – ethnic-Hungarian Slovak singer
- 2010 – Kalligram Publishing House – Hungarian-language publishing house in Dunajská Streda

== See also ==
- Hungary-Slovakia relations
