= Plavnica =

- Municipality
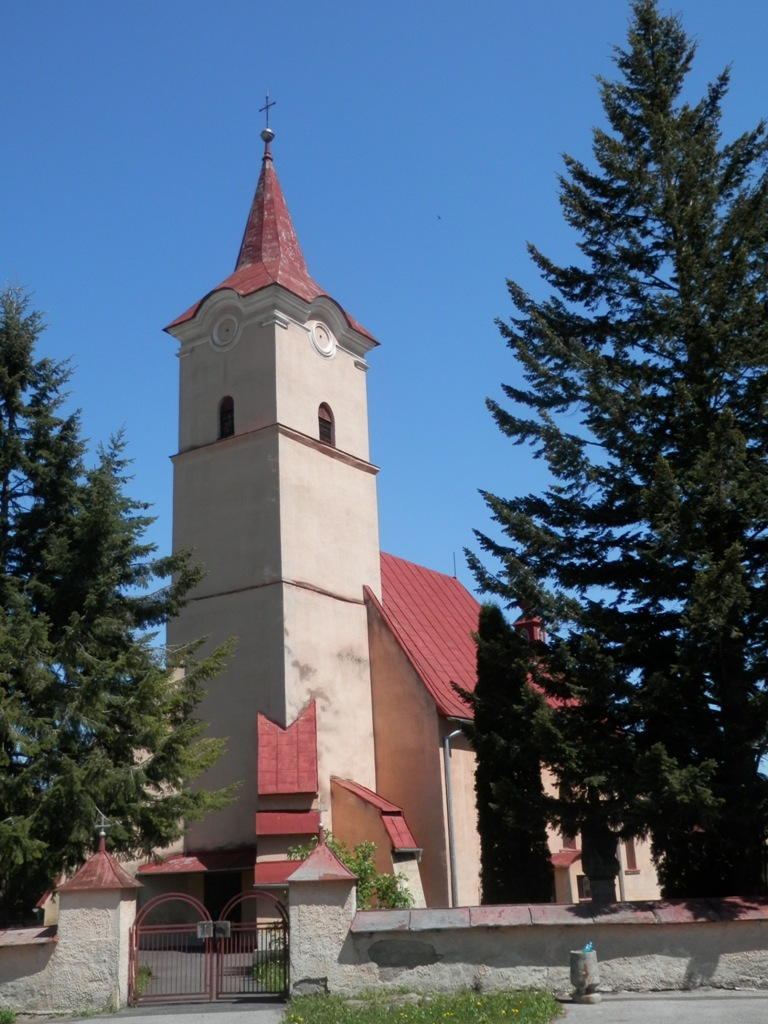

- Flag

- Location of Plavnica in the Prešov Region Location of Plavnica in Slovakia
- Coordinates: 49.28°N 20.78°E
- Country: Slovakia
- Region: Prešov Region
- District: Stará Ľubovňa District
- First mentioned: 1325

Area
  - Total: 19.60 km^{2} (7.57 sq mi)
- Elevation: 515 m (1,690 ft)

Population (2025)
  - Total: 1,651
- Time zone: UTC+1 (CET)
  - Summer (DST): UTC+2 (CEST)
- Postal code: 654 5
- Area code: +421 52
- Vehicle registration plate (until 2022): SL
- Website: www.plavnica.sk

Plavnica (Hungarian: Palonca Rusyn: Плавніця) is a village and municipality in Stará Ľubovňa District in the Prešov Region of northern Slovakia.

== History ==
In historical records the village was first mentioned in 1325. Before the establishment of independent Czechoslovakia in 1918, Plavnica was part of Sáros County within the Kingdom of Hungary. From 1939 to 1945, it was part of the Slovak Republic. On 23 January 1945, the Red Army dislodged the Wehrmacht from Plavnica and it was once again part of Czechoslovakia.

== Geography ==
The municipality lies at an altitude of 515 metres (1,690 ft) and covers an area of 19.60 km^{2} (7.57 sq mi) (2025).

== Population ==
Population statistic (10 years)
Year	1995	2005	2015	2025
Count	1483	1535	1634	1651
Difference		+3.50%	+6.44%	+1.04%

Population statistic
Year	2024	2025
Count	1663	1651
Difference		−0.72%

It has a population of 1651 people (31 December 2025).

=== Ethnicity ===
Census 2021 (1+ %)
Ethnicity	Number	Fraction
Slovak	1580	96.51%
Rusyn	63	3.84%
Not found out	56	3.42%
Total	1637	

In year 2021 was 1637 people by ethnicity 1580 as Slovak, 63 as Rusyn, 56 as Not found out, 8 as Czech, 4 as Ukrainian, 3 as Polish, 1 as Italian and 1 as German.

Note on population: The difference values of population numbers in the table "Population statistic" and in the sections "Ethnicity" & "Religion" is caused by the use of various statistical methods.

=== Religion ===
Census 2021 (1+ %)
Religion	Number	Fraction
Roman Catholic Church	1409	86.07%
Greek Catholic Church	114	6.96%
None	39	2.38%
Not found out	37	2.26%
Evangelical Church	22	1.34%
Total	1637	

In year 2021 was 1637 people by religion 1409 from Roman Catholic Church, 114 from Greek Catholic Church, 39 from None, 37 from Not found out, 22 from Evangelical Church, 8 from Eastern Orthodox Church, 3 from Calvinist Church, 2 from Ad hoc movements, 1 from Paganism and natural spirituality, 1 from Islam and 1 from Apostolic Church.

== Famous residents ==
- Tim Hudak, Slovak-Canadian politician and leader of the Progressive Conservative Party of Ontario.
- Jana Laššáková, MP (2002-2017), Justice of the Constitutional Court of Slovakia (2017-2023)
