= Peter Pellegrini =

President of Slovakia since 2024

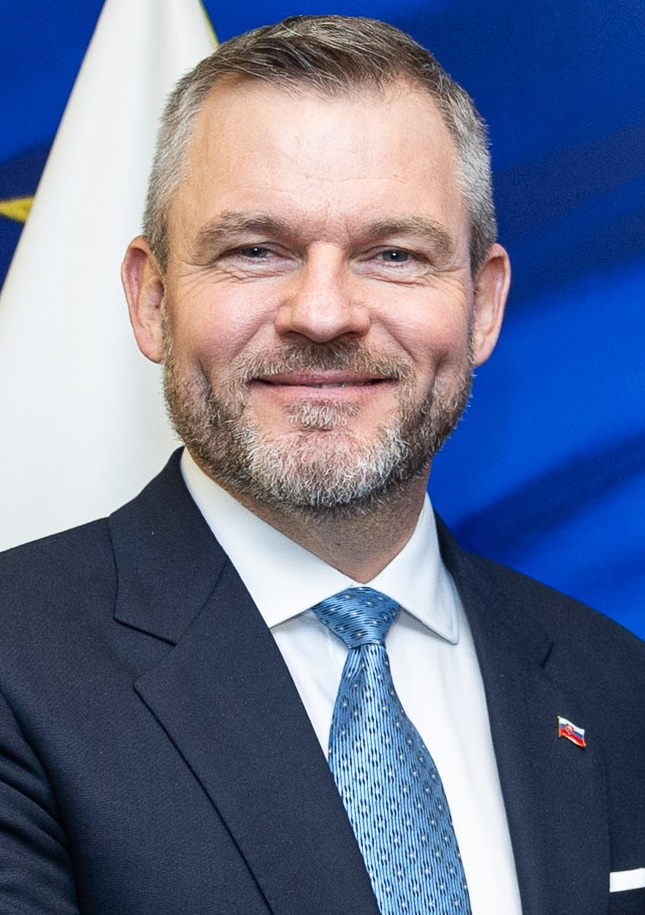
- Pellegrini in 2024

6th President of Slovakia
- Incumbent
- Assumed office 15 June 2024
- Prime Minister: Robert Fico
- Preceded by: Zuzana Čaputová

Prime Minister of Slovakia
- In office 22 March 2018 – 21 March 2020
- President: Andrej Kiska; Zuzana Čaputová
- Deputy: See list: Gabriela Matečná; Richard Raši; László Sólymos; Peter Kažimír
- Preceded by: Robert Fico
- Succeeded by: Igor Matovič
Other positions in the executive
Deputy Prime Minister of Slovakia for Investments and Info
In office 23 March 2016 – 22 March 2018
Prime Minister	Robert Fico
Preceded by	Ľubomír Vážny
Succeeded by	Richard Raši
Minister of Health
Acting; 17 December 2019 – 21 March 2020
Prime Minister	Himself
Preceded by	Andrea Kalavská
Succeeded by	Marek Krajčí
Minister of Finance
Acting; 11 April 2019 – 7 May 2019
Prime Minister	Himself
Preceded by	Peter Kažimír
Succeeded by	Ladislav Kamenický
Minister of Interior
Acting; 17 April 2018 – 26 April 2018
Prime Minister	Himself
Preceded by	Tomáš Drucker
Succeeded by	Denisa Saková
Minister of Culture
Acting; 7 March 2018 – 22 March 2018
Prime Minister	Robert Fico
Preceded by	Marek Maďarič
Succeeded by	Ľubica Laššáková
Minister of Education, Science, Research and Sport
In office 3 July 2014 – 25 November 2014
Prime Minister	Robert Fico
Preceded by	Dušan Čaplovič
Succeeded by	Juraj Draxler
Undersecretary of Finance
In office 11 April 2012 – 3 July 2014
Minister	Peter Kažimír

Speaker of the National Council
- In office 25 October 2023 – 7 April 2024
- President: Zuzana Čaputová
- Deputy: See list: Ľuboš Blaha; Andrej Danko; Michal Šimečka; Peter Žiga
- Preceded by: Boris Kollár
- Succeeded by: Peter Žiga (acting)
- In office 25 November 2014 – 23 March 2016
- President: Andrej Kiska
- Deputy: See list: Ján Figeľ; Erika Jurinová; Jana Laššáková; Renáta Zmajkovičová
- Preceded by: Pavol Paška
- Succeeded by: Andrej Danko
Other positions in the legislature
Deputy Speaker of the National Council
In office 24 March 2020 – 21 October 2020 Serving with Gábor Grendel, Milan Laurenčík and Juraj Šeliga
Speaker	Boris Kollár
Member of the National Council
In office 21 March 2020 – 7 April 2024
In office 25 November 2014 – 23 March 2016
In office 4 July 2006 – 11 April 2012

Chairman of Voice – Social Democracy
- In office 28 November 2020 – 1 June 2024
- Preceded by: Office established
- Succeeded by: Matúš Šutaj Eštok

Personal details
- Born: 6 October 1975 (age 51) Banská Bystrica, Czechoslovakia
- Party: Independent
- Other political affiliations: Direction – Social Democracy (2000–2020); Voice – Social Democracy (2020–2024)
- Education: Matej Bel University; Technical University of Košice (Ing.)
- Website: President of the Slovak Republic

Military service
- Allegiance: Slovakia
- Branch/service: National Defense Force of Slovakia
- Years of service: 2025–present
- Rank: Private First Class

Peter Pellegrini (Note: Slovak pronunciation: [ˈpeter ˈpeleɡriːni]) (born 6 October 1975) is a Slovak politician who has been serving since 2024 as the sixth president of Slovakia. He previously served as prime minister of Slovakia from 2018 to 2020.

Pellegrini also served as the minister of health from December 2019 to March 2020, deputy prime minister (2016–2018) and minister for Education and Science (2014), as well as spending two non-consecutive stints as speaker of the National Council (2014–2016; 2023–2024). Formerly a member of Direction – Social Democracy, he left the party and co-founded and has led Voice – Social Democracy since June 2020.

In January 2024, Pellegrini announced his candidacy in the 2024 Slovak presidential election. He finished in second behind Ivan Korčok in the first round of voting. However, he defeated Korčok in the second round held on 6 April with 53% of the vote and was inaugurated as the 6th president of Slovakia on 15 June 2024.

Pellegrini is the first Slovak politician to have held all three highest constitutional posts (president, prime minister and speaker of Parliament) in the country.

== Early life and education ==
Pellegrini studied at the Faculty of Economics of Matej Bel University and the Technical University of Košice, focusing on banking, investment and finance at the latter. Between 2002 and 2006, he worked as an economist and later as advisor to National Council member for Privatization and Economy Ľubomír Vážny, supported by ĽS-HZDS, SNS and Smer-SD.

== Political involvement ==
=== Early functions ===
He started his political career in 2002 at the age of 26 when he ran for the first time in the parliamentary elections for the party Direction – Social Democracy from 41st place and received 1,223 votes, which was not enough for him to become a deputy National Council of the SR. In the same year, he started working as an economist.

In the 2006 parliamentary election, he ran for the Smer-SD party from the 27th place of the candidate list and was elected as a member of the National Council of the Slovak Republic with a gain of 2,665 votes. During the 2006–2010 election period, he was a member of the Health Parliamentary Committee, Committee of the National Council for reviewing the decisions of the National Security Bureau and a member of the Mandate and Immunity Committee of the National Council.

In the 2010 Slovak parliamentary election, he again ran for the Smer-SD party from the 34th place in the candidate list and with a gain of 2,745 votes became a member of the National Council. As a member of the National Council, he served as a member of the Committee for Finance and Budget and a member of the Committee for Review of Decisions National Security Bureau. He was again reelected in the 2012 elections. He ran from the 35th place and received 5,950 votes. Between 4 April 2012 and 3 July 2014 he was State Secretary for Finance in the Fico's Second Cabinet. At the extraordinary assembly of the Smer-SD party on 28 June 2014, he became its new vice-chairman. On 3 July 2014, after the resignation of the Minister of Education Dušan Čaplovič, President Andrej Kiska appointed him as the minister for education and science.

=== First mandate as speaker of the National Council ===
On 25 November 2014, he was elected speaker of the National Council, succeeding Pavol Paška. In 2015, he was appointed Digital Champion of Slovakia, a European Union appointed position to promote the benefits of an inclusive digital society.

=== Prime minister of Slovakia ===
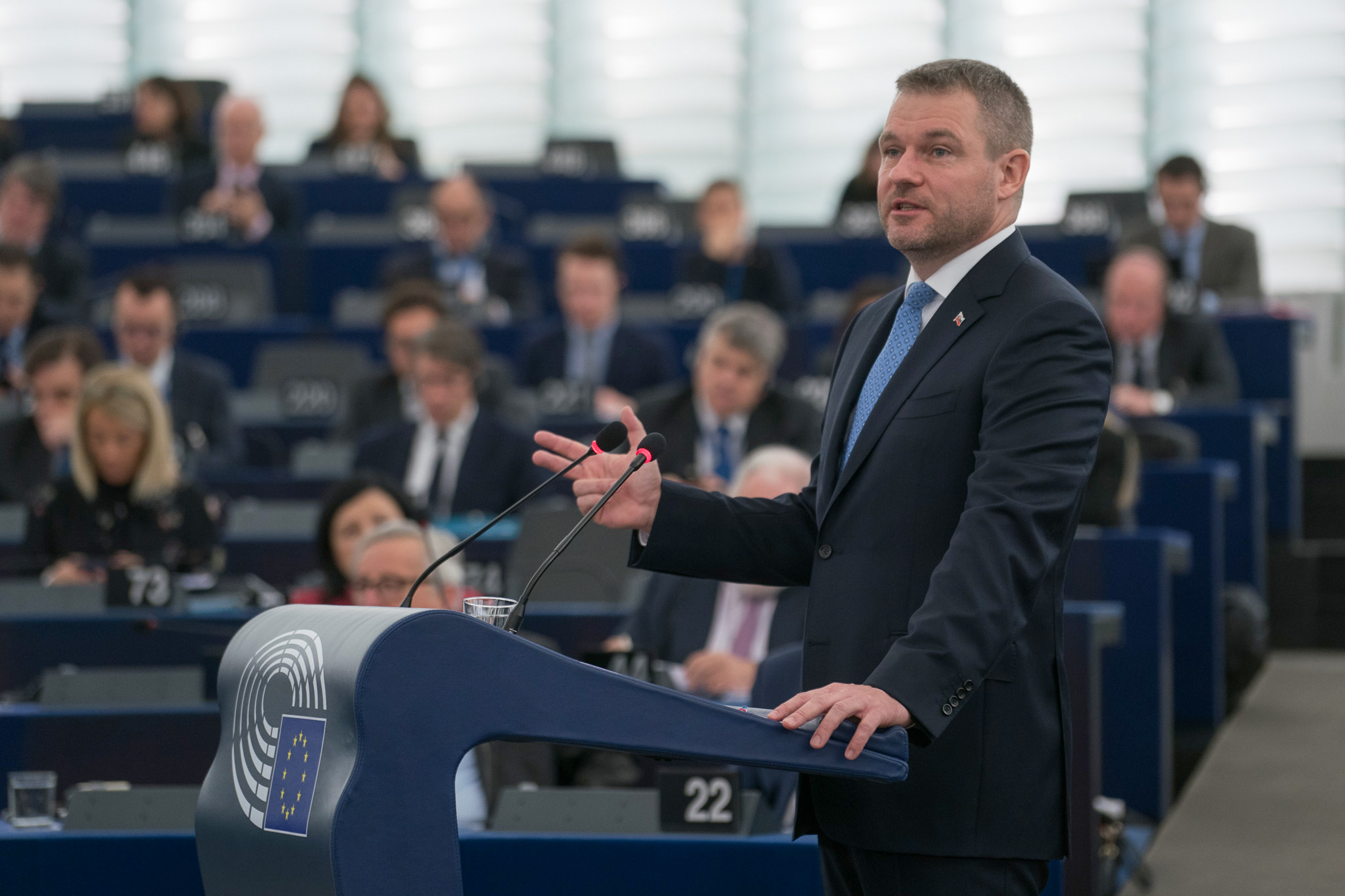
Pellegrini as prime minister speaks to the European Parliament, Strasbourg, March, 2019.

Made deputy prime minister for investments in 2016, under Prime Minister Robert Fico, Pellegrini was sworn in as head of government after his predecessor resigned on 15 March 2018 in the wake of the murder of journalist Ján Kuciak. President Andrej Kiska approved of Pellegrini's Cabinet on 21 March 2018; 81 members of the National Council voted in favour of approving the cabinet the next week. After serving as Acting Interior Minister in April 2018, Pellegrini temporarily took on the role of Finance Minister when Peter Kažimír left to become Governor of the National Bank of Slovakia in 2019.

After about a year of assuming office, Pellegrini was on 3 May 2019 invited on reception by the president of the United States, Donald Trump, on the occasion of the 30th anniversary of the Velvet Revolution and the 15th anniversary of Slovakia's entry into NATO. During the meeting, they discussed issues of energy security, Nordstream 2, illegal migration and Ukraine. Trump praised Slovakia's steps to increase the defense budget by two percent within NATO. Later, in December 2019, he assumed the office of Minister of Health after Andrea Kalavská resigned.

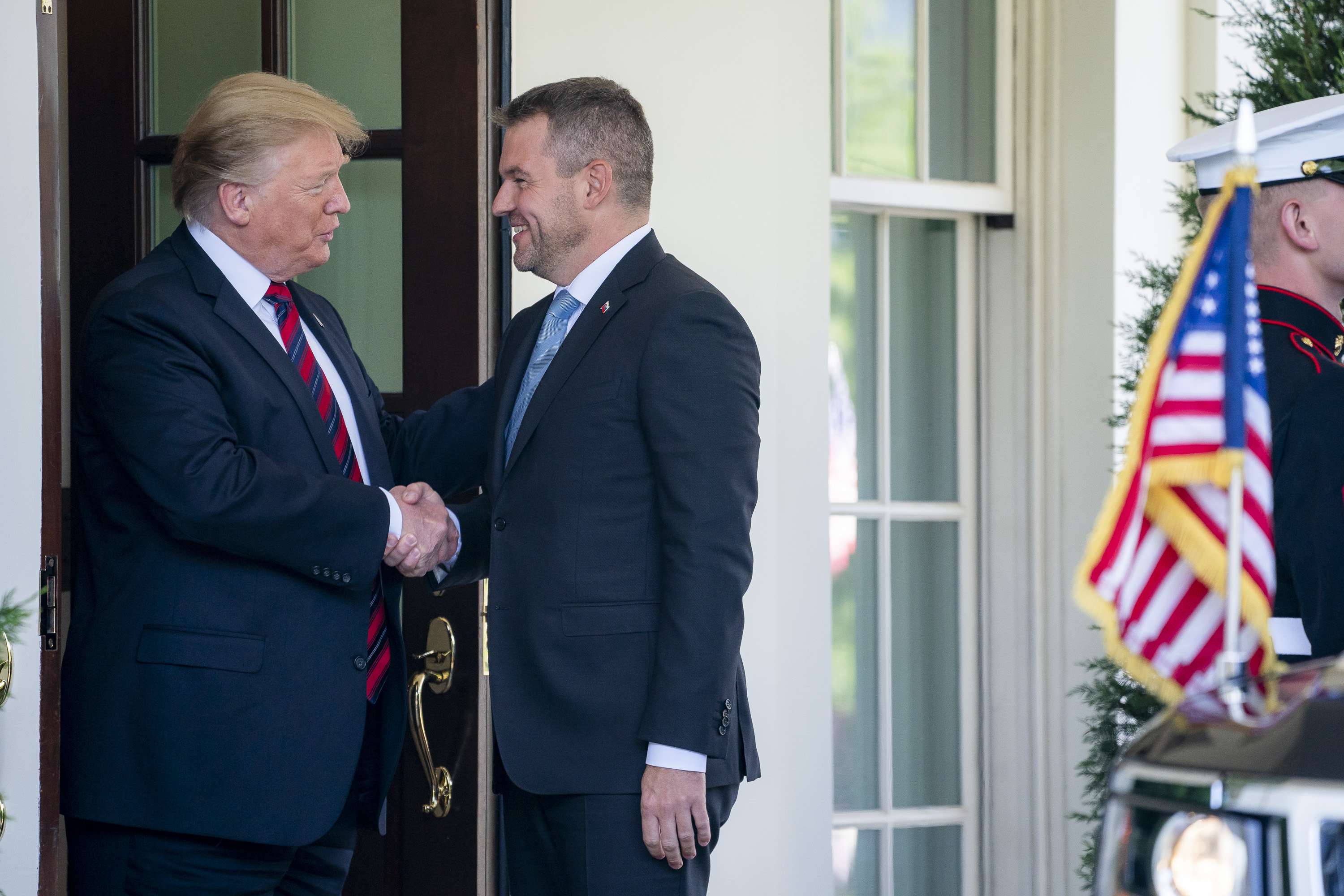
Pellegrini as prime minister, meeting with U.S. President Donald Trump at the White House, Washington D.C., May 2019

His party lost the 2020 parliamentary election to the populist, anti-corruption party Ordinary People led by Igor Matovič. On 16 March 2020, the government introduced measures against the spread of COVID-19 pandemic in Slovakia, introduced a state of emergency for state hospitals in Slovakia, closed all schools, limited movement of citizens, closed business establishments and introduced quarantine.

During the COVID-19 pandemic in 2020, as medical supplies began to dwindle, nations began competing for supplies outside their jurisdictions, either paying companies to reroute or seizing equipment intended for other countries. Pellegrini said he booked two million masks from Ukraine, the requirement was payment in cash. However, a German agent appeared, paid more for the masks, and bought them. Ukraine Foreign Affairs Minister Dmytro Kuleba responded to the situation by saying there was no country in Europe that would not hunt medical masks and respirators around the world.

=== Second mandate as speaker of the National Council ===
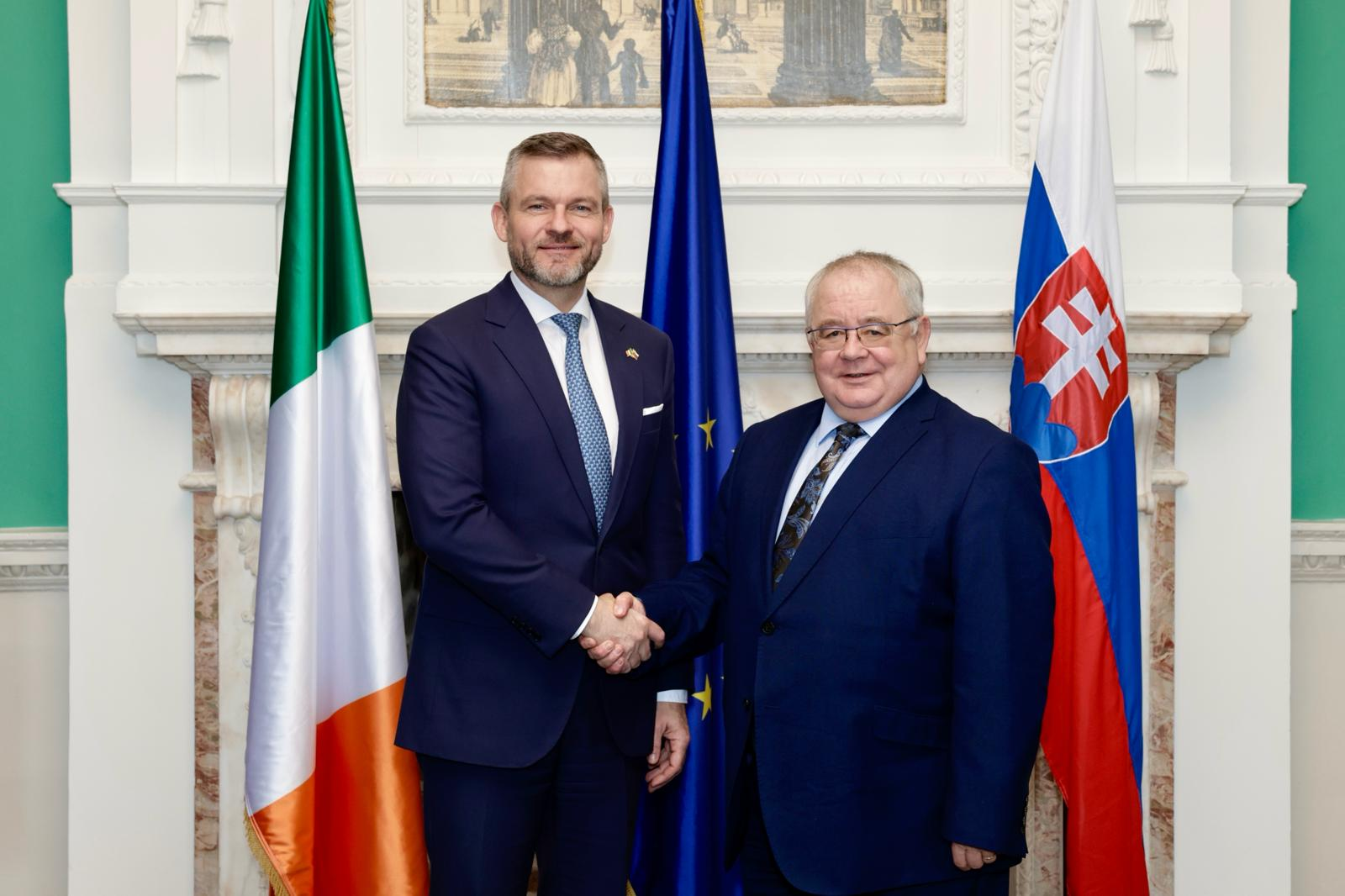
Pellegrini as speaker of the National Council, with the speaker of the lower house of the Oireachtas (parliament) of Ireland, Seán Ó Fearghaíl, Dublin, February 2024

On 25 October 2023, he was re-elected speaker of the National Council with 131 votes.

=== Presidential candidacy ===
On 19 January 2024, after popularity by supporters and support by his party Voice – Social Democracy as well as coalition partners Direction – Social Democracy, he announced his candidacy for the presidency.

On 23 March 2024, he came second in the first round with 37.03% with career diplomat Ivan Korčok winning with 42.52% and retired lawyer and judge Štefan Harabin claiming third with 11.74%. Soon after being second, he had claimed support from coalition partners SNS, whose leader Andrej Danko, withdrew from the first round, as well as unsuccessful candidates Krisztián Forró and Ján Kubiš.

On 6 April 2024, in the second round, he won with 53.12% defeating Ivan Korčok with 46.88%. On the day after the election, he confirmed that he will resign as leader of HLAS-SD and withdraw his membership of the party to honour the unwritten political tradition of the president being a nonpartisan officeholder.

== Presidency ==
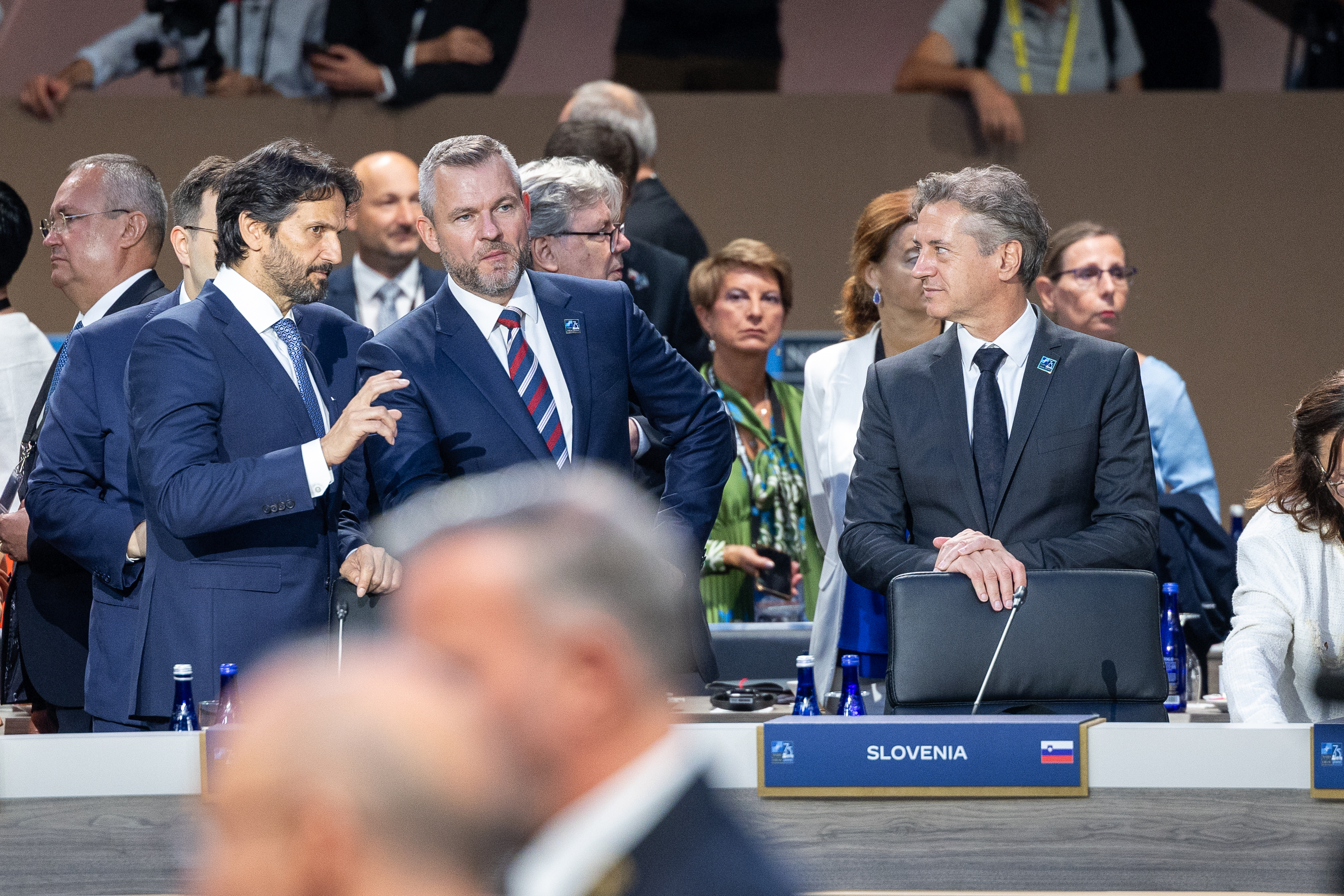
Pellegrini (center, wearing striped necktie) as president at the NATO summit in Washington D.C., July 2024

His presidential inauguration took place on 15 June 2024 during a special session of the National Council in Bratislava.

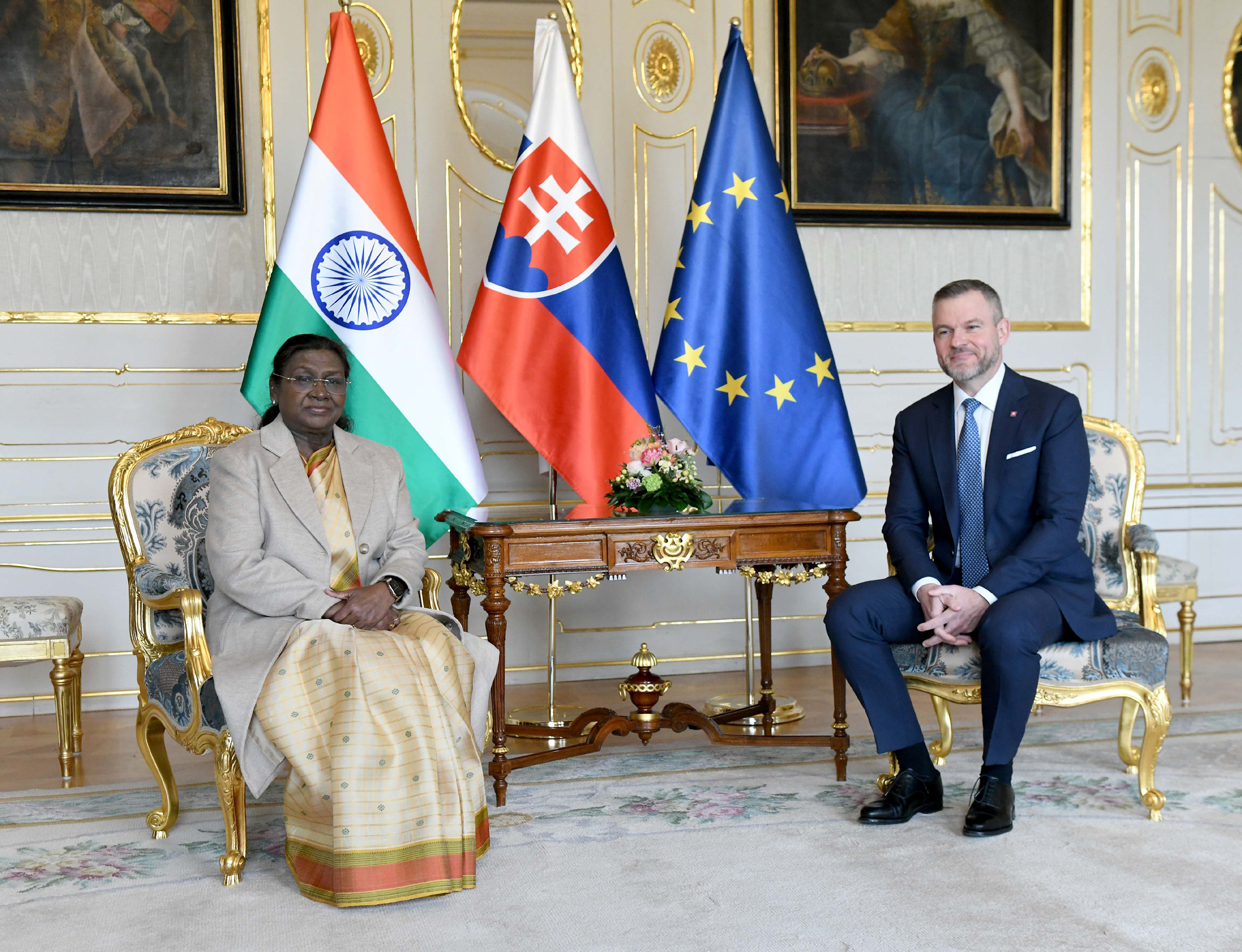
Pellegrini (right) meets India's President Droupadi Murmu at the Grassalkovich Palace in Bratislava, April 2025.

On 6 December 2025, in an interview with STVR, Pellegrini spoke out against EU-funded military aid to Ukraine claiming it was "prolonging the conflict which has devastating consequences for Ukraine" and that the money would be better spent on rebuilding the country following the end of the Russian invasion of Ukraine. Pellegrini urged his fellow European politicians to "speed up and support" the second Donald Trump administration efforts to end the Russo-Ukrainian War. He also said that "today it is obvious to everyone that Ukraine, given the huge army and determination of the Russian military, is simply not able to win this war and push it off its territory."

== Presidential campaign-loan controversy ==
In January 2024, Pellegrini’s party Hlas – sociálna demokracia (Hlas) signed a loan agreement for €300,000 with the company Element Business, whose managing director is Pellegrini’s sister, Eva Pellegrini. Under Slovak law, political parties are required to disclose loan agreements within 30 days of signing. Hlas did not meet this deadline and disclosed the loan only later in 2024, after external scrutiny.

The loan was repaid on 8 October 2024. On 8 September 2025, the State Commission for Elections and Supervision of Political Parties’ Financing imposed a fine of €5,000 on Hlas for late disclosure.

Transparency International Slovakia criticized the party for the delay and described the explanation offered—an “administrative error”—as insufficient to meet statutory transparency obligations.

Further questions were raised when it was reported that Hlas transferred €250,000 to Pellegrini’s campaign account before the loan from Element Business had officially been received, raising concerns over compliance with Slovak campaign finance law.

== Personal life ==
Pellegrini has Italian ancestors. His great-grandfather Leopoldo Pellegrini (1856–1942) of Salter (a Frazione of Romeno in the Trentino Region), which at the time was also part of the Austria-Hungarian Empire, came to Slovakia to participate in the construction of the railway between Levice and Zvolen.

In 2019, he described himself as a non-practising Catholic.

Pellegrini is a bachelor. In a 2020 interview with tabloid magazine Plus 7 dní, he was asked whether he was gay, which he denied. The incident led to the resignation of the magazine's editor, who said that Pellegrini had intervened to stop the question from being published.

Pellegrini owns a dog named Gery, after Geralt of Rivia from The Witcher.

Outside of the Slovak language, Pellegrini is fluent in English, German and Russian.

== Honours ==
=== National honours ===
- Slovakia: Order of Andrej Hlinka
- Slovakia: Order of Ľudovít Štúr
- Slovakia: Milan Rastislav Štefánik Cross
- Slovakia: Pribina Cross

== Notes ==
Political offices
Preceded by Dušan Čaplovič	Minister for Education and Science; 2014	Succeeded by Juraj Draxler
Preceded by Pavol Paška	Speaker of the National Council; 2014–2016	Succeeded by Andrej Danko
Preceded by Ľubomír Vážny	Deputy Prime Minister of Slovakia; 2016–2018	Succeeded by Richard Raši
Preceded by Robert Fico	Prime Minister of Slovakia; 2018–2020	Succeeded by Igor Matovič
Preceded by Boris Kollár	Speaker of the National Council; 2023–2024	Succeeded by Peter Žiga (acting)
Preceded by Zuzana Čaputová	President of Slovakia; 2024–present	Incumbent
