= Fico's Third Cabinet =

Government of Slovakia

- 9th Cabinet of Slovakia

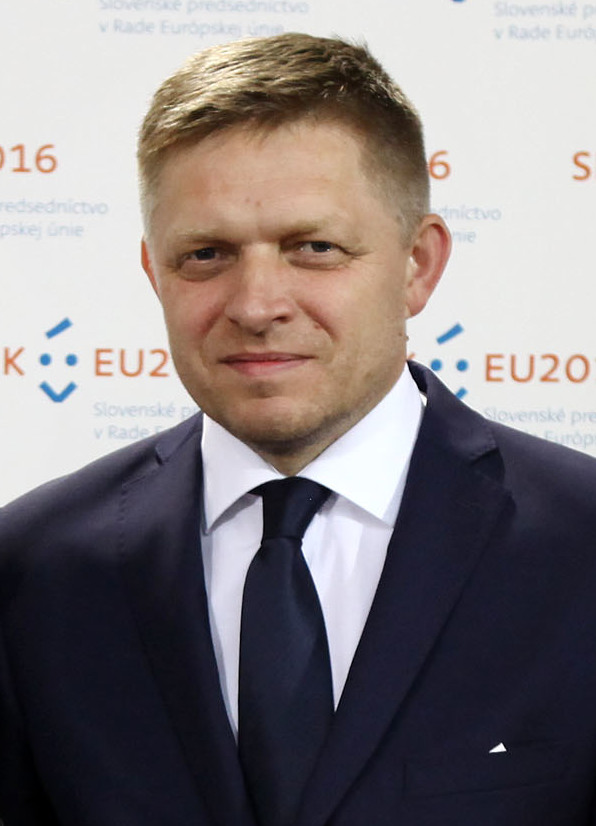
- Fico in 2016
- Date formed: 23 March 2016
- Date dissolved: 22 March 2018

People and organisations
- Head of state: Andrej Kiska
- Head of government: Robert Fico
- No. of ministers: 15
- Member parties: Direction – Social Democracy; Slovak National Party; Most–Híd; Network
- Status in legislature: Coalition government
- Opposition parties: Freedom and Solidarity; Ordinary People; Kotleba – People's Party Our Slovakia; We Are Family
- Opposition leader: Richard Sulík

History
- Election: 2016 Slovak parliamentary election
- Predecessor: Fico's Second Cabinet
- Successor: Pellegrini's Cabinet

Robert Fico's Third Cabinet was the government of Slovakia, headed by Prime Minister Robert Fico.

== Background ==
It replaced Fico's Second Cabinet on 23 March 2016 following the 2016 parliamentary election, in which Fico's Direction – Social Democracy party (Slovak: Smer-SD) lost its parliamentary majority, and met for the first time on March 30. It consists of 15 members including the prime minister, and was originally composed of four parties: Smer–SD, the Slovak National Party, the Slovak-Hungarian Most–Híd party, and the Network party. Most of the elected MPs of Network party joined Most-Híd shortly after the elections and the party is currently dissolved.

On 15 March 2018, in the wake of the political crisis following the murder of Ján Kuciak, Fico delivered his resignation to President Andrej Kiska. New cabinet led by Peter Pellegrini was appointed on 22 March 2018.

== Breakdown by party nomination ==
- Direction – Social Democracy
9
- Slovak National Party
3
- Most–Híd
3
- Network
1

== Composition ==
After the dissolution of the government on the 22 March 2018, most of the ministers stayed on their positions, and continued in the new cabinet of Pellegrini.

Cabinet of Slovakia
Office	Name	Political party	Assumed office	Left office
Prime Minister	Robert Fico	Smer–SD	23 March 2016	15 March 2018
Deputy Prime Minister for Investments and Informatization	Peter Pellegrini	Smer–SD	23 March 2016	22 March 2018
Deputy Prime Minister Minister of Interior	Robert Kaliňák	Smer–SD	23 March 2016	13 March 2018
Deputy Prime Minister Minister of Justice	Lucia Žitňanská	Most–Híd	23 March 2016	22 March 2018
Finance Minister	Peter Kažimír	Smer–SD	23 March 2016	22 March 2018
Minister of Foreign Affairs	Miroslav Lajčák	Independent^{(SD)}	23 March 2016	22 March 2018
Minister of Economy	Peter Žiga	Smer–SD	23 March 2016	22 March 2018
Minister of Transport, Construction and Regional Development	Roman Brecely	Network	23 March 2016	31 August 2016
Minister of Transport, Construction and Regional Development	Árpád Érsek	Most–Híd	31 August 2016	22 March 2018
Minister of Agriculture and Rural Development	Gabriela Matečná	Independent^{(SNS)}	23 March 2016	22 March 2018
Minister of Defence	Peter Gajdoš	Independent^{(SNS)}	23 March 2016	22 March 2018
Minister of Labour, Social Affairs and Family	Ján Richter	Smer–SD	23 March 2016	22 March 2018
Minister of the Environment	László Sólymos	Most–Híd	23 March 2016	22 March 2018
Minister of Education, Science, Research and Sport	Peter Plavčan	Independent^{(SNS)}	23 March 2016	31 August 2017
Minister of Education, Science, Research and Sport	Gabriela Matečná^{(acting)}	Independent^{(SNS)}	31 August 2017	13 September 2017
Minister of Education, Science, Research and Sport	Martina Lubyová	Independent^{(SNS)}	13 September 2017	22 March 2018
Minister of Culture	Marek Maďarič	Smer–SD	23 March 2016	7 March 2018
Minister of Culture	Peter Pellegrini^{(acting)}	Smer–SD	7 March 2018	22 March 2018
Minister of Health	Tomáš Drucker	Independent^{(SD)}	23 March 2016	22 March 2018

Notes
^{(SD)} Smer–SD nominee
^{(SNS)} Slovak National Party nominee

== Party composition ==
From the election until 31 August 2016 the following parties formed the government:

Party	Ideology	Leader	Deputies	Ministers
SMER-SD	Social democracy	Robert Fico	49 / 150	9 / 15
SNS	Ultranationalism	Andrej Danko	15 / 150	3 / 15
Most-Híd	Hungarian minority interests	Béla Bugár	11 / 150	2 / 15
Sieť	Liberal conservatism	Radoslav Procházka	7 / 150	1 / 15
Total			82 / 150	15

After the Sieť left the government the governing parties were the following:

Party	Ideology	Leader	Deputies	Ministers
SMER-SD	Social democracy	Robert Fico	49 / 150	9 / 15
SNS	Ultranationalism	Andrej Danko	15 / 150	3 / 15
Most-Híd	Hungarian minority interests	Béla Bugár	17 / 150	3 / 15
Independents			1 / 150	0 / 15
Total			82 / 150	15

== See also ==
- Fico's First Cabinet
