= Constitutional Court of Slovakia =

Constitutional court in Slovakia

Constitutional Court of the Slovak Republic
- Ústavný súd Slovenskej republiky
- Interactive map of Constitutional Court of the Slovak Republic
- Established: 1 January 1993
- Location: Košice, Slovak Republic
- Composition method: Presidential appointment after nomination of the National Council of the Slovak Republic
- Authorised by: Constitution of the Slovak Republic
- Judge term length: 12 years, not renewable
- Number of positions: 13
- Website: https://www.ustavnysud.sk/

President
- Currently: JUDr. Ivan Fiačan, PhD.
- Since: 17. april 2019

The Constitutional Court of Slovakia (officially Constitutional Court of the Slovak Republic, Slovak: Ústavný súd Slovenskej republiky) is a special court established by the Constitution of Slovakia. Its seat is in Košice in eastern Slovakia. Its head is Ivan Fiačan (since 2019).

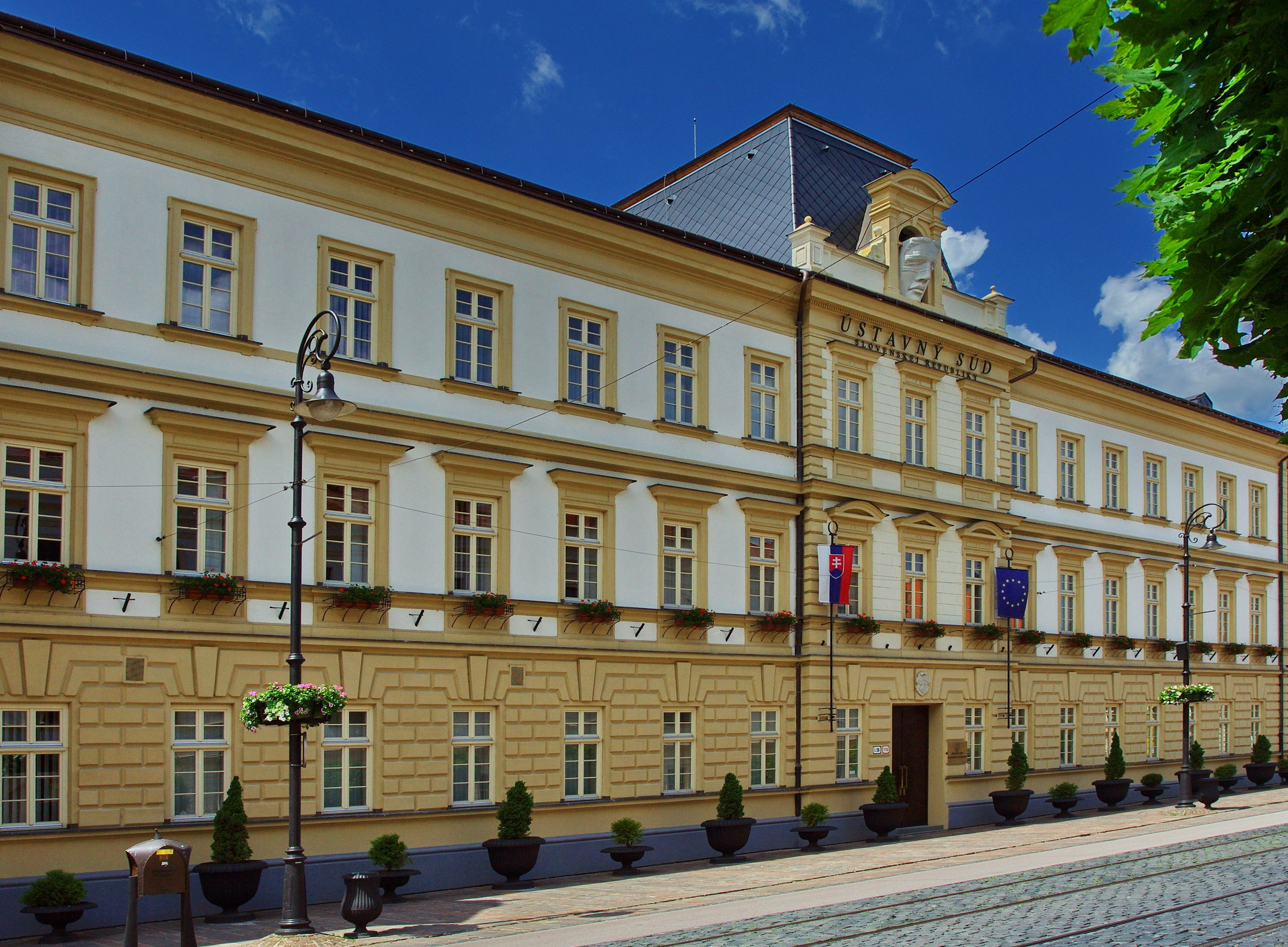
Building of the Constitutional Court of Slovakia in Košice

== Tasks ==
The basic standing of the court and its judges is regulated by the constitution (more precisely, chapter seven, part one).

1.It rules on the compatibility of laws, decrees (either by government or local administration bodies) and legal regulations (issued by local state administration ) with the Constitution, Constitutional law and international treaties

2. It decides on disputes between bodies of state administration, unless if the law specifies that these disputes are decided by another state body .

3.It decides on constitutional complaints against legally valid decisions of state bodies.

4.Deciding the constitutionality and legality of an disputed nation wide election(Presidential, Parlamental, European) and national referendums .

5. Is the only court that can try the President of Slovakia for high treason.

6.Deciding if a Referendum question is compatible with the Constitution

7.Rules on compatibility of an international treaty with the Constitution and Constitutional law

8. It decides on a dispute between Supreme Court and Supreme Administrative Court over matters of jurisdiction

9.It decides on dispute about jurisdiction of the National Audit Office

10. The Constitutional Court decides on complaints by the bodies of territorial selfadministration against unconstitutional or unlawful decisions or against other unconstitutional or unlawful actions in the matters of territorial self-administration, save another Court decides on its protection

11.The Constitutional Court decides on a complaint against a decision verifying or rejecting verification of the mandate of a Member of Parliament.

12.The Constitutional Court decides on whether a decision on declaring a state of extreme emergency or state of emergency and other decisions related to this decision were issued in conformity with the Constitution and constitutional act.

14.The Constitutional Court decides on the conformity of the resolution of the National Council of the Slovak Republic on the abolition of amnesty or individual pardon issued by the President

15. The Constitutional Court carries out disciplinary proceedings against the President and Vice-President of the Supreme Court of the Slovak Republic and the President and VicePresident of the Supreme Administrative Court of the Slovak Republic.

The Court initiates proceedings on the basis of a proposal submitted by: at least one-fifth (i.e. 30) deputies of the National Council of the Slovak Republic, the president of Slovakia, the Government of Slovakia, a court, the general prosecutor, Obmudsman or anyone in the case of constitutional complaints.

== Judges ==
Originally, the Court had ten judges appointed for seven years by the President, who selected them from a list of twenty candidates chosen by the National Council.

After a constitutional amendment in 2001, it is composed of thirteen judges appointed for twelve years and selected by the President from a list of twenty-six candidates elected by the National Council (by a simple majority vote).

A candidate for constitutional judge must be electable to the National Council, be at least 40 years old, be a law school graduate and be practising law for at least 15 years. Judges may be taken into custody only with consent of the Constitutional Court.

== Current composition ==
Current judges of the Constitutional Court
Justice / birthdate and place	Appointed by (President)	Suggested by (government)	Age at		Start date	Length of service	Term ends
Justice / birthdate and place	Appointed by (President)	Suggested by (government)	Start	Present	Start date	Length of service	Term ends
(President of the Court); Ivan Fiačan; May 27, 1969 (age 57); Martin	Andrej Kiska	Pellegrini	49	57	April 17, 2019	7 years, 136 days	April 18, 2031
(Vice-President of the Court); Ľuboš Szigeti; January 11, 1959 (age 67)	Andrej Kiska	Pellegrini	60	67	April 17, 2019	7 years, 136 days	April 18, 2031
Jana Baricová; November 20, 1953 (age 72); Vysoké Mýto	Andrej Kiska	Fico	60	72	July 10, 2014	12 years, 52 days	July 9, 2026
Miroslav Duriš; August 28, 1966 (age 60); Liptovský Mikuláš	Andrej Kiska	Fico	51	60	December 14, 2017	8 years, 260 days	December 13, 2029
Peter Molnár; May 10, 1974 (age 52); Košice	Andrej Kiska	Pellegrini	44	52	April 17, 2019	7 years, 136 days	April 16, 2031
Libor Duľa; July 21, 1966 (age 60); Brno	Zuzana Čaputová	Pellegrini	53	60	October 10, 2019	6 years, 325 days	October 9, 2031
Peter Straka; August 1, 1967 (age 59)	Zuzana Čaputová	Pellegrini	52	59	October 10, 2019	6 years, 325 days	October 9, 2031
Ladislav Duditš; March 27, 1968 (age 58); Košice	Zuzana Čaputová	Pellegrini	51	58	October 10, 2019	6 years, 325 days	October 9, 2031
Rastislav Kaššák; 1977 (48–49)	Zuzana Čaputová	Pellegrini	41-42	48–49	October 10, 2019	6 years, 325 days	October 9, 2031
Martin Vernarský; June 15, 1977 (age 49); Košice	Zuzana Čaputová	Pellegrini	42	49	October 10, 2019	6 years, 325 days	October 9, 2031
Miloš Maďar; 1978 (47–48)	Zuzana Čaputová	Pellegrini	40-41	47–48	October 10, 2019	6 years, 325 days	October 9, 2031
Robert Šorl; February 1, 1976 (age 50); Handlová	Zuzana Čaputová	Matovič	44	50	September 30, 2020	5 years, 335 days	September 29, 2032
vacant							
