= The Blues – ES =

The Blues – ES Modrí – ES
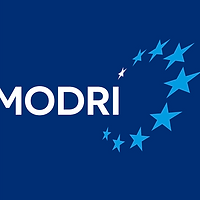
- Abbreviation: MES
- Founder: Mikuláš Dzurinda
- Founded: May 18, 2023; 2 years ago
- Registered: May 3, 2023; 2 years ago
- Dissolved: February 12, 2025; 11 months ago
- Split from: Blue Coalition
- Headquarters: Trnavská cesta 37 831 04 Bratislava
- Ideology: Conservative liberalism Pro-Europeanism
- Political position: Centre-right
- Colours: Blue
- Slogan: «European Slovakia» (Slovak: «Európské Slovensko»)

Website
- www.modri.sk

The Blues – ES (MES; Slovak: Modrí – ES), formerly called The Blues – European Slovakia (M; Slovak: Modrí – Európske Slovensko) and Modrí, Most–Híd (MM; lit. 'The Blue(s), Bridge'), was a Slovak centre-right political party, registered in May 2023. The initiator of its creation is ex-prime minister Mikuláš Dzurinda, who founded it after he decided to leave the Blue Coalition (now Democrats) project.

Around twenty people are involved in the founding team of the party, including Mikuláš Dzurinda's daughter, social anthropologist and international relations graduate Jana Šoková, entrepreneur Tomáš Halgaš or youth activist and Christian-democratic politician Milan Kabina. Politician Pál Csáky was also involved in the founding of the party. According to Dzurinda, they want to be a "center-right party of the conservative-liberal type".

At the founding congress of the party, on 14 May 2023 in Košice, the delegates elected the party chairman (Mikuláš Dzurinda as the only candidate) and four vice-chairmen - Ľuboš Schwarzbacher, Martin Hubinski, Jana Ambrošová and Michal Hort. Among the program priorities for the upcoming parliamentary election, they included strengthening economic growth, stopping the drastic increase in prices and inflation, reforming education and healthcare.

On 18 May 2023, the platform of the former Most–Híd party (under the name Most-Híd 2023) headed by László Sólymos announced cooperation with The Blues party after it announced its withdrawal from the Alliance project in response to the placement of György Gyimesi as a candidate. On 25 May 2023, the party was officially renamed to Modrí, Most–Híd. After the parliamentary election in 2023, the party was renamed to The Blues – ES.

== Election results ==
=== National Council ===
Election	Leader	Votes	%	Rank	Seats	+/–	Status
2023	Mikuláš Dzurinda	7,935	0.3%	15th	0 / 150	New	Extra-parliamentary

=== Presidential ===
Election	Candidate	First round			Second round		
Election	Candidate	Votes	%	Rank	Votes	%	Rank
2024	Endorsed; Ivan Korčok	958,393	42.5%	1st	1,243,709	46.9%	2nd
