= Rudolf Chmel =

Slovak politician (born 1939)

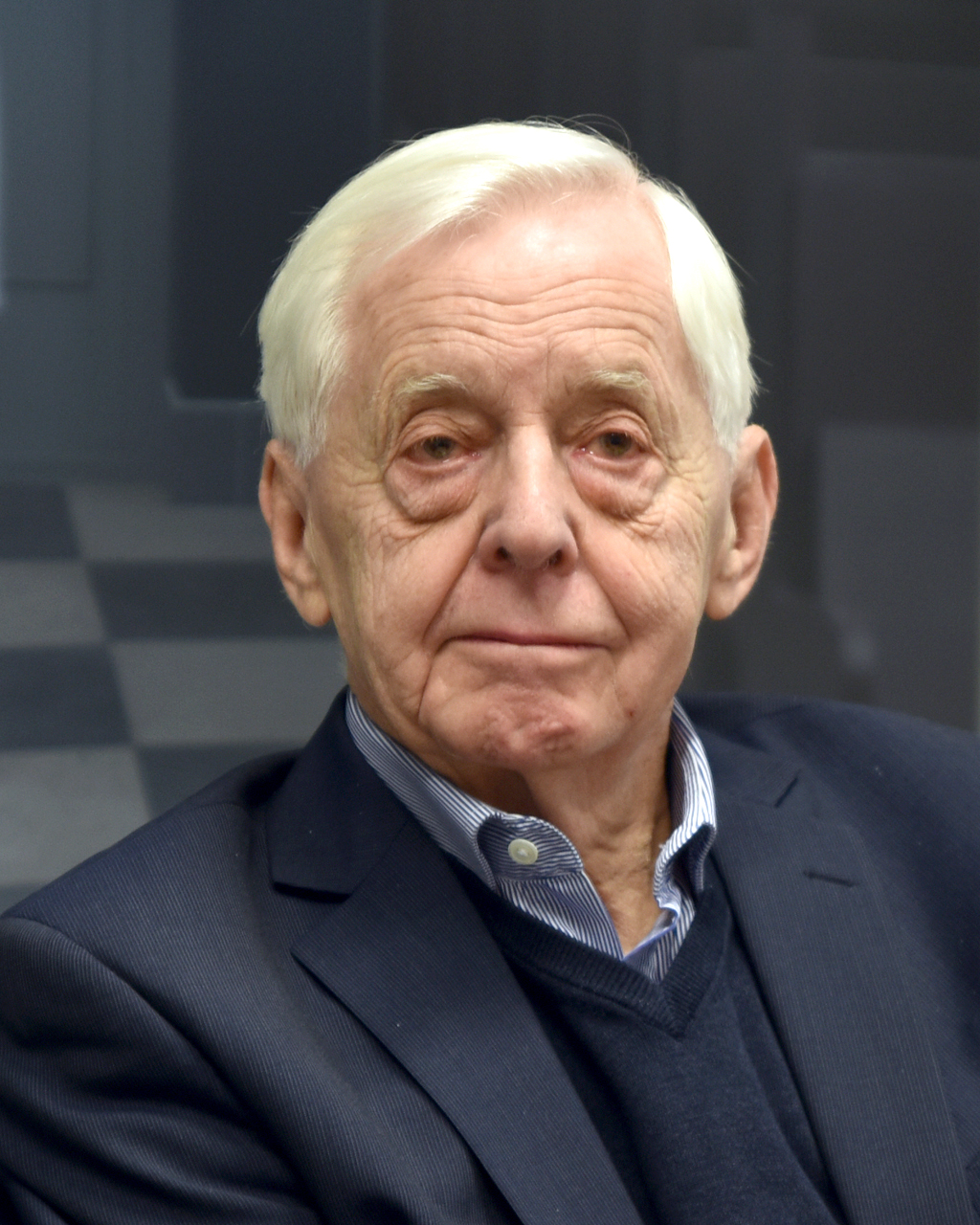

Minister of Culture of Slovakia
- In office 16 October 2002 – 24 May 2005
- Preceded by: Milan Kňažko
- Succeeded by: František Tóth
- In office 5 April 2006 – 4 July 2006
- Preceded by: František Tóth
- Succeeded by: Marek Maďarič

Personal details
- Born: 11 February 1939 (age 87) Plzeň, Czechoslovakia (now Czech Republic)
- Party: Alliance of the New Citizen (2002-2009); Most–Híd (2009-)

Rudolf Chmel (born 11 February 1939) is a Slovak politician who was Minister of Culture in the government of Slovakia from 2002 to 2005 and again in 2006. He was also the last ambassador of Czechoslovakia accredited to Hungary, a member of the Parliament of Slovakia, and a writer and editor. From 2010 to 2012, he was the Deputy Prime Minister in Iveta Radičová's government.

== Education and literature career ==
He graduated in 1961 in Slovak literature and language at the Faculty of Arts of Comenius University in Bratislava. He received the academic title DrSc. in 1992 and became an associate professor in 1993. Between 1993 and 2000 he was the president of the Open Society Foundations in Bratislava. He taught at Charles University in Prague and at the Faculty of Arts of Comenius University in Bratislava.

From 1961 he worked for the Slovak Academy of Sciences in Bratislava, initially at the Slovak Literature Institute, later, in 1964, he moved to the World Literature and Languages Institute of the Slovak Academy of Sciences. He became a researcher at the Literary Studies Institute in 1973. Between 1972 and 1982 he was an editor of the journal Slovenská literatúra (Slovak Literature) and from 1982 he was secretary of the Czechoslovak Writers Union. In 1988 he became editor-in-chief of journal Slovenské pohľady (Slovak Views).

== Political career ==
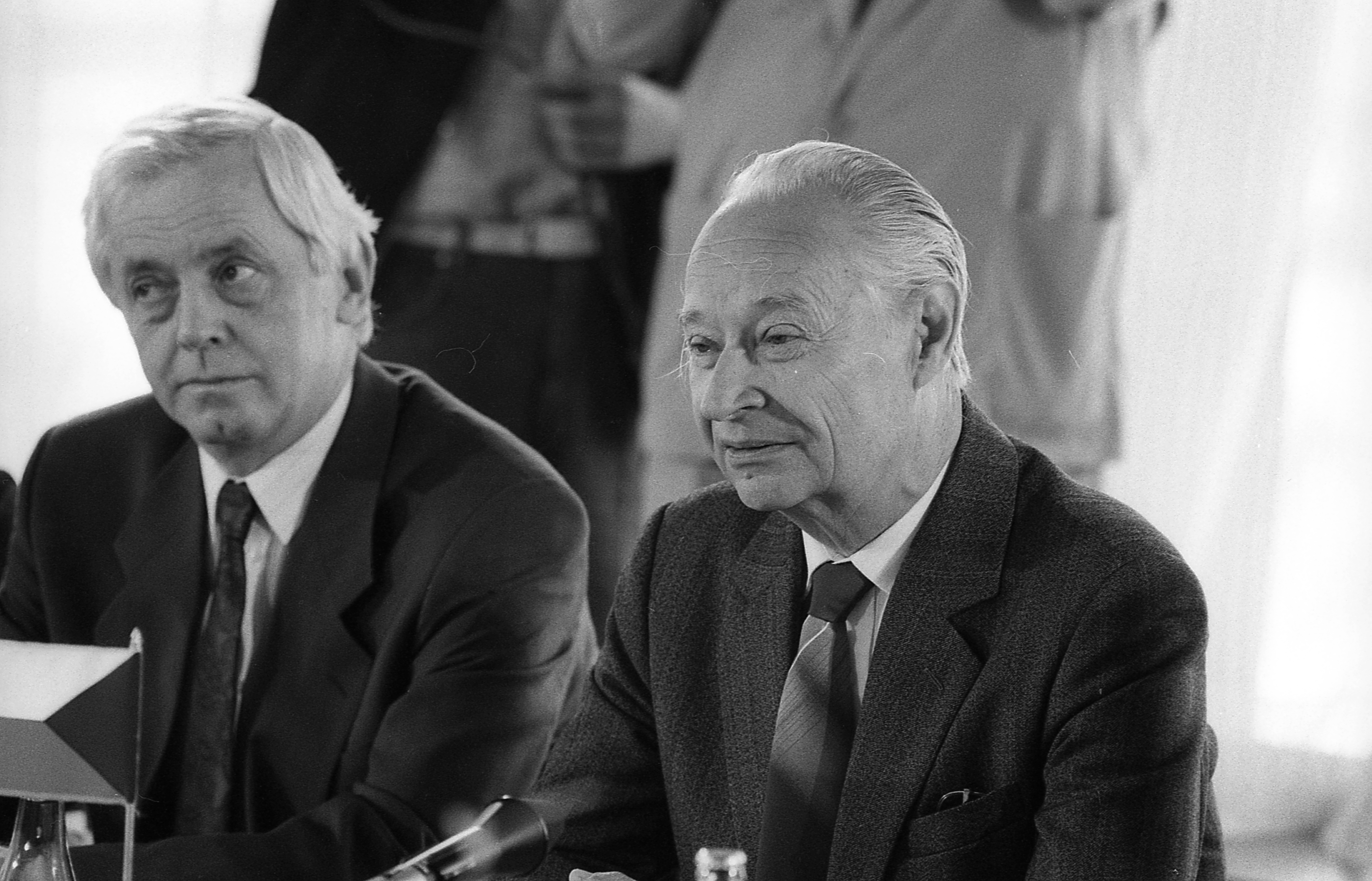
Chmel (left) and Alexander Dubček at an event in Budapest, July 1990

From June 1990 until 1992 he served as the last Czechoslovak ambassador to Hungary. After his return, he went back to the Slovak Academy of Science.

In the 2002 elections he was elected Member of the Parliament for the Party Alliance of the New Citizen, which nominated him for the Minister of Culture. He held this position from 16 October 2002 to 24 May 2005 and 5 April 2006 to 4 July 2006. From 2009 to 2014 he was the vice-president of Most–Híd. In 2009 he was one of those who got the Award for Good Neighborhood and Understanding.

== Personal life ==
He speaks Czech, Slovak, Russian, Hungarian, Polish and German.

He is married and has four children.

== See also ==
- Politics of Slovakia
