= Peter Gajdoš =

Slovak politician (born 1959)

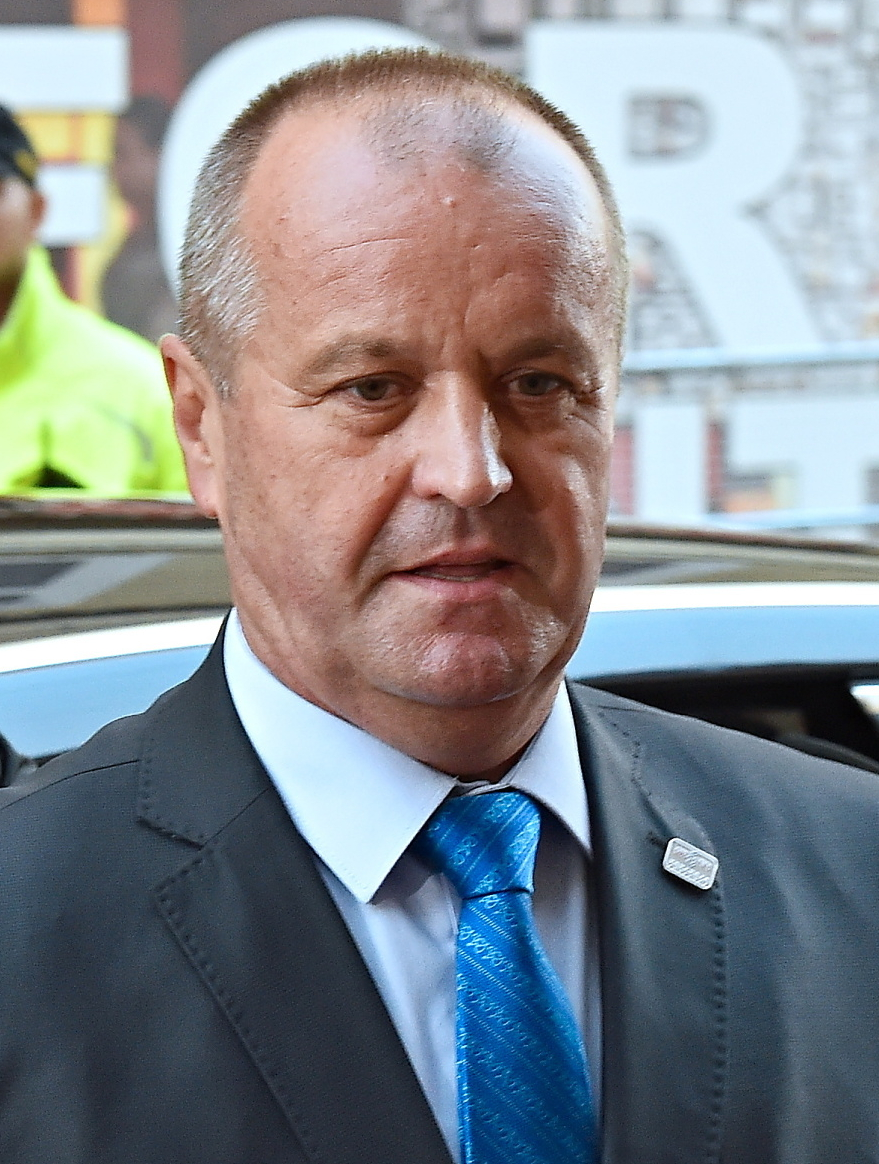
- Gajdoš in 2016

Minister of Defence
- In office 23 March 2016 – 20 March 2020
- President: Andrej Kiska; Zuzana Čaputová
- Prime Minister: Robert Fico; Peter Pellegrini
- Preceded by: Martin Glváč
- Succeeded by: Jaroslav Naď

Personal details
- Born: 9 April 1959 (age 67) Nitra, Czechoslovakia
- Party: Slovak National Party
- Children: 2

Military service
- Branch/service: Czechoslovak People's Army; Slovak Armed Forces
- Years of service: 1982–2016
- Rank: Lieutenant general

Peter Gajdoš (9 April 1959) is a Slovak retired three star general and politician who served as the minister of defence from 2016 to 2020.

== Biography ==
Peter Gajdoš was born on 9 April 1959 in Nitra. He studied at the military school in Banská Bystrica and the Land Forces Military Academy in Vyškov and the Frunze Military Academy in Moscow. In 1982, he became a platoon commander in the 8th Mechanized Regiment of the Czechoslovak People's Army, located in Bratislava. Gajdoš was subsequently promoted to battalion commander in 1984 and regimental commander in 1992. After the dissolution of Czechoslovakia, which resulted in the dissolution of the Czechoslovak People's Army, Gajdoš became the commander of the 10th Tank Regiment of the Slovak Armed Forces located in Martin. Between 1995 and 1998 he served as the personal secretary of the defense minister Ján Sitek. Afterwards, he held several high level positions with the General Staff of the Slovak Armed Forces. Between 2010 and 2013, Gajdoš served as the Military Representative of Slovakia to the NATO Military Committee.

=== Political career ===
Gajdoš became the minister of defence of the Fico's Third Cabinet on 23 March 2016 as a personal nominee of Andrej Danko, the chainman of the Slovak National Party (SNS). Danko knew Gajdoš from the 1990s, when the later served as the personal secretary of the minister Sitek, who was a member of SNS. After Imrich Andrejčák, who served as the defence minister from 1992 to 1994, Gajdoš became the second soldier in the role.

The nomination of Gajdoš was controversial, as SNS was seen by the political opposition and pundits as anti-NATO. Nonetheless, after becoming minister, Gajdoš stressed he supports NATO, highlighting his experience as the Slovak representative to the NATO military committee and his background as an apolitical military expert. However, Gajdoš became a member of SNS in 2017.

In 2016, Gajdoš controversially promoted Danko, the chairman of SNS, who was a corporal in Slovak army reserves by 8 ranks straight to captain on the justification that the leader of SNS pushed for an increase of defense budget.

In 2018, signed a contract with a representative of Lockheed Martin for the purchase of F-16 Fighting Falcon jets as a replacement of Slovakia's aging fleet of Mig 29 fighters. The order represented at the time the largest purchase of military equipment in the history of Slovakia.

== Personal life ==
Gajdoš is married and has two children.
