= Voderady =

- Municipality
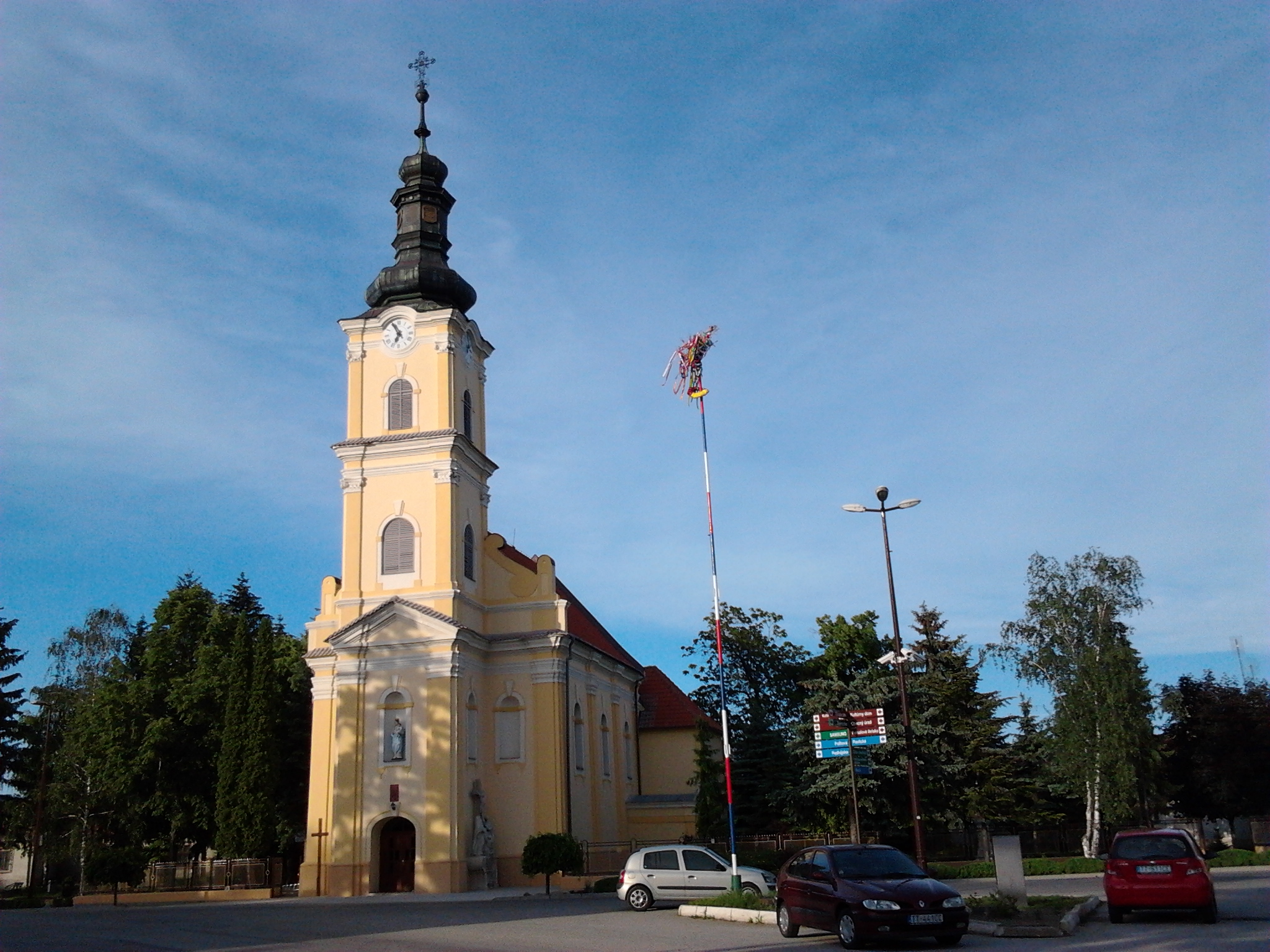

- Flag

- Location of Voderady in the Trnava Region Location of Voderady in Slovakia
- Coordinates: 48.28°N 17.57°E
- Country: Slovakia
- Region: Trnava Region
- District: Trnava District
- First mentioned: 1241

Area
  - Total: 14.14 km^{2} (5.46 sq mi)
- Elevation: 132 m (433 ft)

Population (2025)
  - Total: 1,787
- Time zone: UTC+1 (CET)
  - Summer (DST): UTC+2 (CEST)
- Postal code: 919 42
- Area code: +421 33
- Vehicle registration plate (until 2022): TT
- Website: www.voderady.sk

Voderady (Hungarian: Vedrőd) is a village and municipality of Trnava District in the Trnava region of Slovakia. Voderady is located near of a Samsung LCD production facility. The village itself is connected through the D1 motorway to Bratislava and Trnava.

== Etymology ==
The name comes from the Slovak voderadi meaning "servants in the service of the lordship obliged to maintain drainage canals".

== Geography ==
The municipality lies at an altitude of 132 metres (433 ft) and covers an area of 14.14 km^{2} (5.46 sq mi) (2025).

== Population ==
Population statistic (10 years)
Year	1995	2005	2015	2025
Count	1242	1349	1465	1787
Difference		+8.61%	+8.59%	+21.97%

Population statistic
Year	2024	2025
Count	1783	1787
Difference		+0.22%

It has a population of 1787 people (31 December 2025).

=== Ethnicity ===
Census 2021 (1+ %)
Ethnicity	Number	Fraction
Slovak	1575	97.88%
Not found out	30	1.86%
Total	1609	

In year 2021 was 1609 people by ethnicity 1575 as Slovak, 30 as Not found out, 9 as Czech, 4 as Bulgarian, 3 as German, 3 as Hungarian, 3 as Other, 3 as English, 2 as Serbian, 2 as Russian, 1 as Jewish, 1 as Vietnamese, 1 as Romani, 1 as Rusyn and 1 as Greek.

Note on population: The difference values of population numbers in the table "Population statistic" and in the sections "Ethnicity" & "Religion" is caused by the use of various statistical methods.

=== Religion ===
Census 2021 (1+ %)
Religion	Number	Fraction
Roman Catholic Church	1235	76.76%
None	295	18.33%
Not found out	25	1.55%
Total	1609	

In year 2021 was 1609 people by religion 1235 from Roman Catholic Church, 295 from None, 25 from Not found out, 14 from Evangelical Church, 11 from Greek Catholic Church, 6 from Other, 5 from Christian Congregations in Slovakia, 3 from Seventh-day Adventist Church, 3 from Apostolic Church, 2 from Eastern Orthodox Church, 2 from Paganism and natural spirituality, 2 from Ad hoc movements, 1 from Old Catholic Church, 1 from Calvinist Church, 1 from Other and not ascertained christian church, 1 from Jehovah's Witnesses, 1 from Hinduism and 1 from Buddhism.

== Notable people ==
- Renáta Zmajkovičová, politician
