= Zuzana Zvolenská =

Slovak lawyer and politician

Minister of Health
- In office 4 April 2012 – 6 November 2014
- Prime Minister: Robert Fico
- Preceded by: Ivan Uhliarik
- Succeeded by: Viliam Čislák

Personal details
- Born: 27 January 1972 (age 54) Bratislava, Czechoslovakia (now Slovakia)
- Party: Direction-Social Democracy
- Spouse: Ladislav Zvolenský
- Children: Juraj
- Education: Comenius University
- Occupation: Politician
- Profession: Lawyer

Zuzana Zvolenská (born 27 January 1972) is a Slovak lawyer and politician and from 4 April 2012 until 3 November 2014 she was the Minister of Health of Slovakia in Fico's Second Cabinet for the Direction – Social Democracy party (Slovak: Smer-SD).

Her tenure as minister was marked by significant efforts to reform key sectors within the healthcare system including notably the health insurance sector. One key priority was to secure the re-establishment of a unitary system of public health insurance. Zvolenska announced her resignation on 3 November in response to a controversy regarding financial irregularities.

== Early life and education ==
Zuzana Zvolenská was born 27 January 1972 in Bratislava, then a part of Czechoslovakia. In 1995 she graduated from the Law Faculty of the Comenius University in Bratislava and started working in the banking and insurance sector.

== Early career ==
In 2002, she joined the Joint health insurance company (Slovak: Spoločná zdravotná poisťovňa). In 2006 she was promoted to deputy Director General, as well as promoted to the board of directors. At the General Assembly that same year, in September 2006, she was elected as President of the Board and General Director. In 2008, she was appointed Director-General and the chairperson of the Board of the state-owned main health insurance provider General Health Insurance Company (Slovak: Všeobecnej zdravotnej poisťovne).

Since October 2010 she was a member of the Official Board of Insurance Trust, and from February 2011 she worked at the Office of the Adviser for Health Surveillance. Following the 2012 elections, President Ivan Gasparovic appointed her Minister of Health on 4 April 2012 as part of the government of Robert Fico. Zvolenská was not a member of the Smer-SD party and she was nominated for the ministerial post as an expert from outside.

== Minister of Health ==
=== Labor disputes ===
Immediately after her appointment as health minister, her department inherited several ongoing labor disputes, primarily with doctors and nurses in the public health service. As her ministry set about with far-reaching reforms, with the stated goal of improving insurance coverage as well as reducing overall health-care costs for patients, hospital employees unions voiced their anger over low salaries.

The dispute was a continuation from the previous administration, who in late 2011 declared a state of emergency when industrial lockouts and wildcat strikes at public hospitals threatened to shut down the health sector. The situation flared up again in December 2012, when doctors at Zilina University Hospital launched a new strike, where they en masse handed in their resignations, with hundreds more across the country threatening to do the same, should the situation go unresolved. Responding to the incident, Zvolenska said the decision to strike was "immoral and un-ethical", and said "the right to strike does not exceed the right to healthcare nor the right to life". She also confirmed that the health ministry was considering legal action against the strikers.

In January 2013 the health ministry agreed to raise the salary of doctors by 20%, calming the dispute. This was given final approval by the Cabinet in April. A raise in nurses salaries was also approved, but was struck down by the Constitutional court. In the aftermath of the dispute, Zvolenska's ministry introduced a law, which made dodging work, or going on phony sick-leave punishable by up to three years in prison. Although this was later reduced to a €3,300 fine, after yet another round of dispute with the health worker unions.

=== Health insurance reform ===
A plan to reform Slovakia's health insurance system, from a plural system into a singular system with one National health care provider had been on the books with the Smer party since their previous term ending in 2010. The plan involved the state purchasing or expropriating all the private health insurance operators on the market and uniting them into one, which would then be run by the health ministry under Zvolenska.

On October 31, 2012, the cabinet of Robert Fico gave the "unitary health insurer project" tailored by the Zvolenska its blessing. Zvolenska listed three ways in which it can create a single health insurance company: acquiring the shares of the private health insurance companies, taking over the management of the private insurers' client portfolios, and expropriating the private health insurers for an appropriate sum, with the first option cited as the best alternative. If the government reaches an agreement with the private insurers about the sale of their shares, the single health insurer could be launched as of January 1, 2014. In the event of expropriation, the single insurer would not emerge until July 2014. Not unexpected, the plan faced massive resistance from the private sector insurance companies.

The plans caused controversy when Achmea, a Dutch private insurance group, filed a lawsuit against the Slovak state, after legislation was passed prohibiting it from extracting profits. The international court of arbitration ruled against Slovakia, and awarded Achmea €30 million. After running into further legal and financial setbacks, the time-line of the project was revised to last through 2015 at the earliest. According to economical and political analysts, the poor state of government finances was the reason for the delays. In February 2014, the reform plan was pushed back indefinitely. The plan had already hit a raw nerve with the two private health insurers operating on the Slovak market, Zvolenska said the project was ready but it would not progress until the funding is secured. In response, Finance Minister Peter Kažimír said "As the manager of the state treasury I have to say today that we do not have the money for it."

=== Primary health-care reform ===
In April 2013, Zvolenska's ministry introduced a law which reintroduced the system, in which patients were required to visit their primary physician first, in order to be referred to a specialist. This was in order to avoid situations were patients visited several outpatient clinics for a single problem, thus duplicating examinations, as well as to improve the general quality of the health-care service. The parliamentary opposition, namely the SDKU said the changes amounted to "bullying" (Slovak: šikana) and "harassment" of the patient. This was denied by Zvolenska.

== Controversies ==
=== "CT-scanner case" and resignation ===
On 30 October 2014, the private news outlet Markíza reported that the Alexander Winter Hospital in Piešťany had sought in 2012 to purchase a CT-scanner produced by Siemens for €1 million, but the tender was stopped after the March 2012 parliamentary elections due to the change of the top management. The new management, which included top Smer-SD officials, announced a new round of bidding and subsequently chose another device produced by Philips for €1.6 million. The price was approximately three times higher than similar devices in neighbouring Czech Republic; for example, a hospital in the Czech town of Havlíčkův Brod had recently bought a similar CT scanner for around €540,000. The Hospital management did not explain why the new CT scanner was so expensive and its secretariat responded that hospital director was on vacation and unable to comment.

Zvolenska responded by replacing all the members of the managing board of the hospital nominated by the Health Ministry, arguing that they have not informed her properly about the proceedings in this hospital. She has also filed a complaint with the Supreme Audit Office (NKÚ) and the Public Procurement Office (ÚVO) to check whether the tender was in line with the rules.

On 4 November, just days after the story broke, prime minister Fico publicly called for Zvolenska's resignation along with Deputy Speaker of Parliament Renáta Zmajkovičová, who was chairperson of the board of directors at the hospital. Fico stated "The process of the [public] procurement of the CT device in Piešťany raises doubts and it is not enough to react to those doubts by sacking the members of the board of directors, which has already happened, the one who manages these people must also leave". On 6 November Zvolenska offered her resignation and was replaced by state secretary Viliam Čislák.

== Personal life ==
She is married to Ladislav Zvolenský and together they have one son, named Juraj, who currently attends elementary school. She is fluent in English and Russian.

Political offices
Preceded by Ivan Uhliarik	Minister of Health; 2012–2014	Succeeded by Viliam Čislák
