= Ľubomír Jahnátek =

Slovak politician

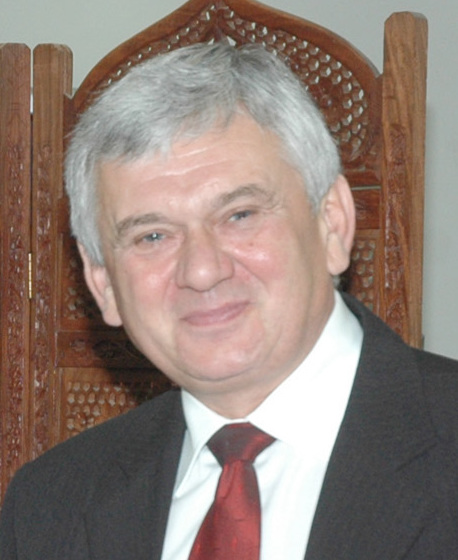

Minister of Agriculture and Rural Development
- In office 4 April 2012 – 23 March 2016
- Prime Minister: Robert Fico
- Preceded by: Zsolt Simon
- Succeeded by: Gabriela Matečná

Minister of Economy
- In office 4 July 2006 – 8 July 2010
- Prime Minister: Robert Fico
- Preceded by: Jirko Malchárek
- Succeeded by: Juraj Miškov

Personal details
- Born: 16 September 1954 (age 71) Komjatice, Czechoslovakia (now Slovakia)
- Party: Direction – Slovak Social Democracy; Communist Party of Czechoslovakia
- Spouse: Daniela Jahnátková
- Children: 2
- Education: Slovak University of Technology in Bratislava

Ľubomír Jahnátek (born 16 September 1954) is a Slovak politician for the Direction - Social Democracy (Slovak: Smer-SD). He served as Minister of Economy in Fico's First Cabinet from 2006 to 2010 and as Minister of Agriculture and Rural Development in Fico's Second Cabinet from 2012 to 2016.

Ľubomír Jahnátek was chairman of the network industry regulation office URSO since July 2017. He was dismissed from his functions on 4 June 2020 by the newly elected government. He appealed this decision to the Constitutional Court, which ruled in his favor.
