= Ivan Uhliarik =

Slovak politician and doctor (born 1968)

Minister of Health
- In office 2010–2012
- Prime Minister: Iveta Radičová
- Preceded by: Richard Raši
- Succeeded by: Zuzana Zvolenská

Personal details
- Born: 3 June 1968 (age 57) Námestovo, Czechoslovakia
- Party: Christian Democratic Movement
- Children: 5

Ivan Uhliarik (born 3 June 1968 in Námestovo) is a Slovak Physician and politician for the Christian Democratic Movement (Slovak: Kresťanskodemokratické hnutie) and served from 8 June 2010 until 4 April 2012 as Minister of Health in the Cabinet of Iveta Radičová.
