= Ján Richter =

Slovak politician

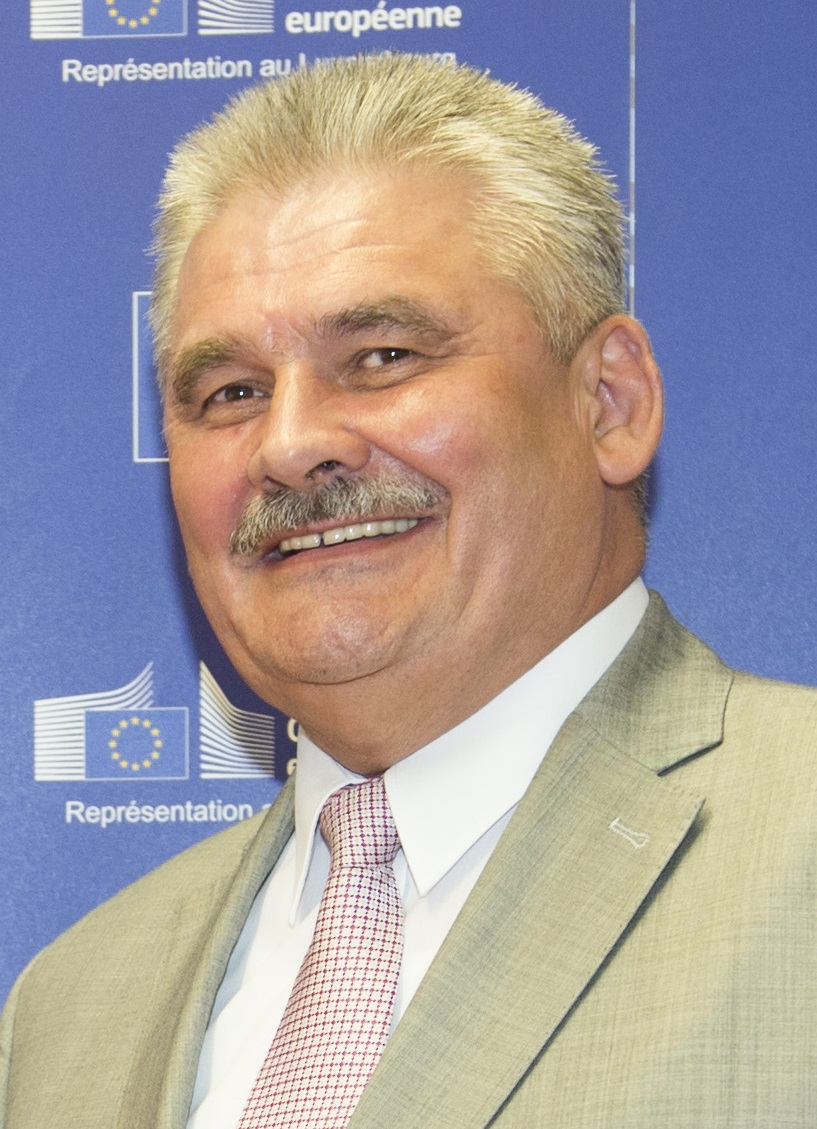
- Richter in 2018

Member of the National Council
- Incumbent
- Assumed office 21 March 2020
- In office 4 July 2006 – 4 April 2012

Minister of Labour, Social Affairs and Family
- In office 4 April 2012 – 21 March 2020
- Prime Minister: Robert Fico; Peter Pellegrini
- Preceded by: Jozef Mihál
- Succeeded by: Milan Krajniak

Personal details
- Born: 5 October 1956 (age 69) Zlaté Moravce, Slovakia
- Party: Direction – Social Democracy (2005–present)
- Other political affiliations: Communist Party (until 1990); Party of the Democratic Left (1990–2005)
- Education: Evening University of Marxism–Leninism; Matej Bel University (JUDr.)
- Occupation: Politician

Ján Richter (born 5 October 1956) is a Slovak politician. Since 2006 he has been a member of the National Council for the SMER-SD party. From 4 April 2012 to 20 March 2020, he served as Minister of Labour, Social Affairs and Family.

== Biography ==
After graduating from apprenticeship (secondary vocational school without matriculation) in 1973 he worked as a technical and economic worker in the company CALEX Zlaté Moravce until 1987. At Calex he was an active member and chairman of the Socialist Youth Union in and at the same time, since 1975, a candidate of the Communist Party of Slovakia. In addition to his work, he graduated from the Evening University of Marxism–Leninism (VUML), thanks to which he was able to work as a worker of the District Committee of the Communist Party of Slovakia (OV KSS) in Nitra.

In the 1990s he worked as a technical and economic worker and later as a tradesman and manager. In 1998 he became the central secretary of the SDĽ. Between 1999 and 2007 he completed his bachelor's and master's studies at the Matej Bel University in Banská Bystrica and eventually obtained a doctorate in law. However, there is some confusion as to how he obtained his bachelor's degree. For example, he did not even remember the title of his thesis in front of journalists. In 2005, he became the political secretary of the Smer-SD party. Since 2006, he has been a member of the National Council of the Slovak Republic for the Smer-SD party.

== Political career ==
Since 2012 he has been the Minister of Labour, Social Affairs and Family of the Slovak Republic.

On 11 June 2013, around noon, he was injured in a traffic accident involving a service vehicle on the R1 road near the village of Pata. The car skidded during heavy rain and went off the road. Ján Richter was not wearing a seatbelt during the accident and suffered spinal injuries (second cervical vertebra) and fractured ribs, from which he recovered for several weeks.

On 7 September 2017, the second dismissal of Minister Richter took place. Before the meeting, Prime Minister Fico said that if the SNS voted against Richter, the government would fall. In the end, Richter received 65 votes, 61 MPs voted against and 14 abstained. He therefore retained his post. In April 2017, 57 MPs were in favour of his departure, 68 were against, and two did not vote. The reason for the dismissals was the case of the Galanta resocialization facility Čistý den (English: Clean Day), in the investigation of which Richter was supposed to have failed as a minister.

The government of Peter Pellegrini, in which Ján Richter also served, resigned on 20 March 2020. A new government was formed after the February elections.
