= Gabriela Matečná =

Slovak agriculturist and politician

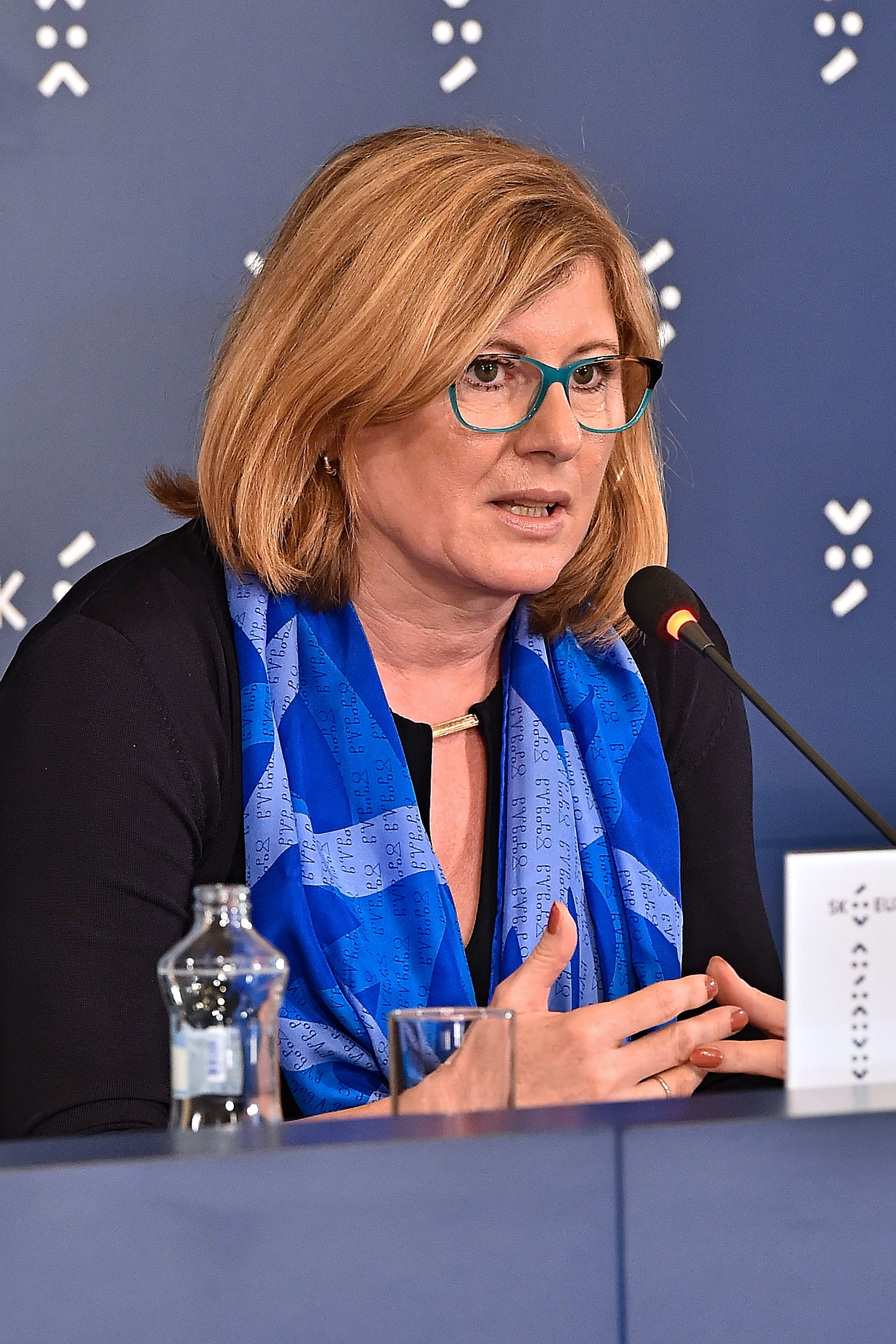
- Matečná in 2016

Minister of Agriculture and Rural Development
- In office 23 March 2016 – 21 March 2020
- Prime Minister: Robert Fico; Peter Pellegrini
- Preceded by: Ľubomír Jahnátek
- Succeeded by: Ján Mičovský

Deputy Prime Minister
- In office 22 March 2018 – 21 March 2020 Serving with Peter Kažimír, László Sólymos,Richard Raši
- Prime Minister: Peter Pellegrini

Personal details
- Born: 28 November 1964 (age 61) Poprad, Czechoslovakia
- Party: Slovak National Party
- Children: 1
- Education: Slovak University of Agriculture

Gabriela Matečná (born 28 November 1964) is a Slovak agriculturalist and politician. Between 2016 and 2020, she served as the Minister of Agriculture and Rural Development. Since 2018, she is a member of the Slovak National Party.

== Early life ==
Matečná graduated from the Slovak University of Agriculture. Since 2008, she worked at the Slovak Land Fund - the government agency responsible for managing government owned agricultural land. In 2012, she became the CEO of the Fund as a nominee of the Direction – Slovak Social Democracy party. As a CEO, she faced accusations of helping people connected to the Prime Minister Robert Fico to buy lucrative state-owned land.

== Political career ==
Matečná became the Minister of Agriculture in 2016 as a nominee, but not a member of, the Slovak National Party. She became a member of the party in 2018. After the Slovak National Party failed to pass the representation threshold in the 2020 Slovak parliamentary election, she retired from politics.
