= Fico's Second Cabinet =

- 8th Cabinet of Slovakia
- 4 April 2012 - 23 March 2016
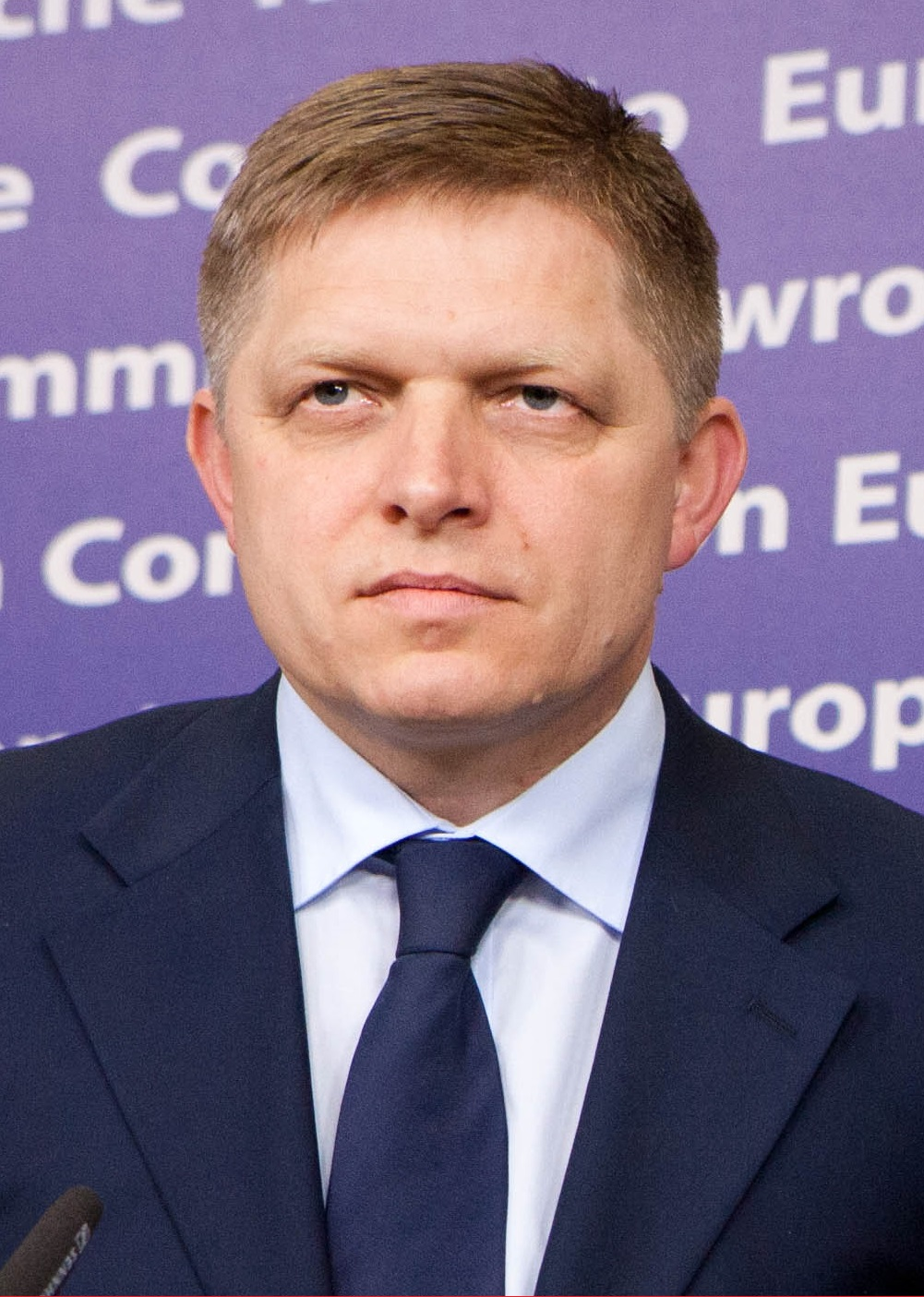
- Date formed: 4 April 2012
- Date dissolved: 23 March 2016

People and organisations
- Head of state: Ivan Gašparovič; Andrej Kiska
- Head of government: Robert Fico
- No. of ministers: 14
- Ministers removed: 6
- Total no. of members: 20
- Member party: Direction - Social Democracy
- Status in legislature: Majority
- Opposition party: KDH; OĽANO; Most-Híd; SDKÚ-DS; Sloboda a Solidarita
- Opposition leader: Ján Figeľ

History
- Election: 2012 Slovak parliamentary election
- Incoming formation: 2012
- Outgoing formation: 2016
- Predecessor: Radičová's Cabinet
- Successor: Fico's Third Cabinet

Robert Fico's Second Cabinet is the former government of Slovakia, headed by prime minister Robert Fico. Appointed on 4 April 2012, it consists of 14 members, 11 from the Direction - Social Democracy party (Slovak: Smer-SD) and three independents. It replaced Iveta Radicova's cabinet after gaining an absolute majority in the Slovak parliament following the 2012 Slovak parliamentary election.

This was the first time since the breakup of Czechoslovakia that any party had won an absolute majority, though Smer-SD fell seven seats short of a three-fifths majority to unilaterally amend the constitution.

Fico's Second Cabinet was replaced by Fico's Third Cabinet on 23 March 2016.

== Composition ==
Following the 2012 Slovak parliamentary election, the current prime minister, Robert Fico is serving with his government since 4 April 2012.

Cabinet of Slovakia
Office	Name	Political party	Assumed office	Left office
Prime Minister	Robert Fico	Smer-SD	4 April 2012	23 March 2016
Deputy Prime Minister; Minister of Interior	Robert Kaliňák	Smer-SD	4 April 2012	23 March 2016
Deputy Prime Minister; Minister of Finance	Peter Kažimír	Smer-SD	4 April 2012	23 March 2016
Deputy Prime Minister; Minister of Foreign Affairs	Miroslav Lajčák	Independent	4 April 2012	23 March 2016
Deputy Prime Minister for Investment	Ľubomír Vážny	Smer-SD	16 November 2012	23 March 2016
Minister of Economy	Tomáš Malatinský	Independent	4 April 2012	3 July 2014
Minister of Economy	Pavol Pavlis	Smer-SD	3 July 2014	6 May 2015
Minister of Economy	Peter Kažimír^{(acting)}	Smer-SD	6 May 2015	16 June 2015
Minister of Economy	Vazil Hudák	Independent	16 June 2015	23 March 2016
Minister of Transport, Construction and Regional Development	Ján Počiatek	Smer-SD	4 April 2012	23 March 2016
Minister of Agriculture and Rural Development	Ľubomír Jahnátek	Smer-SD	4 April 2012	23 March 2016
Minister of Defence	Martin Glváč	Smer-SD	4 April 2012	22 March 2016
Minister of Defence	Robert Fico^{(acting)}	Smer-SD	22 March 2016	23 March 2016
Minister of Justice	Tomáš Borec	Independent	4 April 2012	23 March 2016
Minister of Labour, Social Affairs and Family	Ján Richter	Smer-SD	4 April 2012	23 March 2016
Minister of the Environment	Peter Žiga	Smer-SD	4 April 2012	23 March 2016
Minister of Education, Science, Research and Sport	Dušan Čaplovič	Smer-SD	4 April 2012	3 July 2014
Minister of Education, Science, Research and Sport	Peter Pellegrini	Smer-SD	3 July 2014	25 November 2014
Minister of Education, Science, Research and Sport	Juraj Draxler	Independent	25 November 2014	23 March 2016
Minister of Culture	Marek Maďarič	Smer-SD	4 April 2012	23 March 2016
Minister of Health	Zuzana Zvolenská	Independent	4 April 2012	6 November 2014
Minister of Health	Viliam Čislák	Smer-SD	6 November 2014	23 March 2016

== Party composition ==
Party	Ideology	Leader	Deputies	Ministers
SMER-SD	Social democracy	Robert Fico	83 / 150	14 / 14
Total			83 / 150	14

== Confidence motion ==
Motion of confidence Robert Fico (SMER-SD)
Ballot →	15 May 2012
Required majority →	72 out of 143 (simple)
Yes: • SMER-SD (81); • OĽaNO (1)	82 / 150
No: • KDH (13); • OĽaNO (6); • Most-Híd (13); • SaS (11); • SDKÚ-DS (10)	53 / 150
Absentions: • SMER-SD (1); • KDH (1); • OĽaNO (8)	10 / 150
Absentees: • SMER-SD (1); • KDH (2); • OĽaNO (1); • SDKÚ-DS (1)	5 / 150

== See also ==
- Fico's First Cabinet
