= Constitution of Slovakia =

The Constitution of Slovakia, officially the Constitution of the Slovak Republic (Slovak: Ústava Slovenskej republiky), is the current constitution of Slovakia. It was passed by the Slovak National Council on 1 September 1992 and signed on 3 September 1992 in the Knights Hall of the Bratislava Castle. The constitution went to effect on 1 October 1992 (1 January 1993 in some parts). The day of constitution is remembered as Constitution Day on 1 September.

== History ==
In 1969, Czechoslovakia became a federation with the Czech Socialist Republic and Slovak Socialist Republic as its constituent parts. This happened as a result of Prague Spring reforms, which was a period of political liberalization in Czechoslovakia as a communist state after World War II. However, in 1969, the normalization period started and while formally the federation was preserved, power was again centralized. The 1968 constitutional law "On the Czecho-Slovak Federation" (No. 143/1968, Art. 142) stipulated that after passing the new federal constitution, both republics would adopt their own constitutions, but this was never implemented. First works on a Slovak constitution started right after the Velvet Revolution in 1990. In March 1990, a group of legal experts formed the Plank Committee, led by Professor Karol Plank. This included professionals from the legal field, political figures and prominent professors of law. The complexity of the task were not limited to:

- Karol Plank, Slovak lawyer, university professor and head of the Supreme Court of the Slovak Republic,
- Marian Posluch, the Minister of Justice of the Slovak Republic at the time,
- Ľubomír Fogaš, Slovak lawyer and university professor,
- Štefan Grman, secretary of the Legislative Council of the Government,
- Milan Čič, former Prime Minister of the Slovak Socialist Republic, and
- Jozef Klapáč, member of the Institute of State and Law of the Slovak Academy of Sciences.

Together, said people prepared the first and eventually the final draft of the Slovak Constitution. There is no information on who did what portion of the work on the final version of the Slovak Constitution.

The Slovak Constitution was prepared quickly in 1992, with many formulations taken directly from the Czechoslovak Constitution of 1920 and being marked by a compromise with socialism, while also taking several examples from constitutions of Western countries.

== Overview ==
The text of the Constitution is divided into the preamble and nine parts, with most being divided into chapters, which are also divided into 156 articles but do not need to be divided further into paragraphs and/or letters.

- The Preamble
- First part
  - General provisions (a. 1 to 7a)
  - State symbols (a. 8 and 9)
  - Capital of the Slovak Republic (a. 10)
- Second part – Fundamental rights and freedoms
  - General provisions (a. 11 to 13)
  - Fundamental human rights and freedoms (a. 14 to 25)
  - Political rights (a. 26 to 32)
  - Rights of national minorities and ethnic groups (a. 33 and 34)
  - Economic, social and cultural rights (a. 35 to 43)
  - Right to protect the environment and cultural heritage (a. 44 and 45)
  - Right to judicial and other legal protection (a. 46 to 50)
  - Part one and part two joint provisions (a. 51 to 54)
- Third part
  - Economy in the Slovak Republic (a. 55 to 59)
  - Supreme Audit of the Slovak Republic (a. 60 to 63)
- Fourth part – Legal self-governing bodies (no chapters, a. 64 to 71)
- Fifth part – Legislative power
  - National Council of the Slovak Republic (a. 72 to 92)
  - Referendum (a. 93 to 100)
- Sixth part – Executive power
  - President of the Slovak Republic (a. 101 to 107)
  - Government of the Slovak Republic (a. 108 to 123)
- Seventh part – Judicial power (2 chapters)
  - Constitutional Court of the Slovak Republic (a. 124 to 140)
  - Judiciary of the Slovak Republic (a. 141 to 148)
- Eighth part – Office of the public prosecutors in the Slovak Republic
  - Public prosecutors of the Slovak Republic (a. 149 to 151)
  - Ombudsman (a. 151a)
- Ninth part – Transitory and final provisions (no chapters, a. 152 to 156)

== Amendments ==
Three fifths (90 out of 150) of the votes in the parliament are necessary to supplement and/or amend the Constitution. It has been amended several times.

1. Amendment from 14 July 1998: This is rather a minor amendment: The President could be elected on a suggestion of at least 8 MPs (the President was voted by the parliament at that time) and some of the President's powers were transferred to the Speaker of Parliament.
2. Amendment from 14 January 1999: President was no longer voted by the Parliament, and begun to be elected by popular vote for five years. It also changes the President's powers and relations between him and other institutions.
3. Amendment from 23 February 2001: It is the greatest amendment so far, relating to Slovakia's attempt to enter the European Union (e.g. Slovakia will recognize international treaties). It also changes the electoral law, introduces ombudsman to the Slovak law system, transfers right to name judges for unlimited time from parliament to the President and other major or minor changes in functions of nearly all institutions.
4. Amendment from 4 March 2004: Minor change to the constitution, from article 78, paragraph 2, where the last sentence was omitted.
5. Amendment from 14 May 2004: Amendment was in relation to the preparation to the European Parliament election. It added sentence about inconsistency of being an MP in the Parliament and in the European Parliament. It also extended rights of the Constitutional Court of Slovakia for ruling whether the election to the EP is constitutional.
6. Amendment from 27 September 2005: Expanded the authority of the Supreme Audit Office to include oversight of the finances of regional and local governments. In disputed cases, it granted the Constitutional Court the authority to decide whether the Supreme Audit Office has the constitutional right of oversight in that case.
7. Amendment 3 February 2006
8. Amendment 14 March 2006
9. Amendment 4 March 2010
10. Amendment 21 October 2011
11. Amendment 26 July 2012
12. Amendment from 4 June 2014: Defined marriage as a bond between one man and one woman, thereby banning same-sex marriage.
13. Amendment from 21 October 2014: Banned the export of drinking and mineral waters in pipelines and water tanks. The ban excludes bottled water and water for personal use.
14. Amendment from 8 December 2015: Lengthened the general 48 hours limit for detention, in case of suspected terrorists to 96 hours.
15. Amendment from 2 February 2017: Lengthened the term of office of officials elected in 2017 regional county elections to five years.

In June 2023, the parliament voted with the support of 111 of 150 MPs to put the right to use cash in the Constitution of Slovakia. The amendment was proposed by We Are Family.

On 26 September 2025, the parliament voted for a constitutional amendment that formally recognizes only two genders (male and female), and bans surrogacy and adoption of children by same-sex couples. It will also include equal pay for men and women and gives the state full sovereignty in matters of national identity. The Council of Europe notes potential conflicts regarding primacy with international law.

== See also ==
- Constitutional Court of Slovakia
