= Árpád Érsek =

Slovak politician (born 1958)

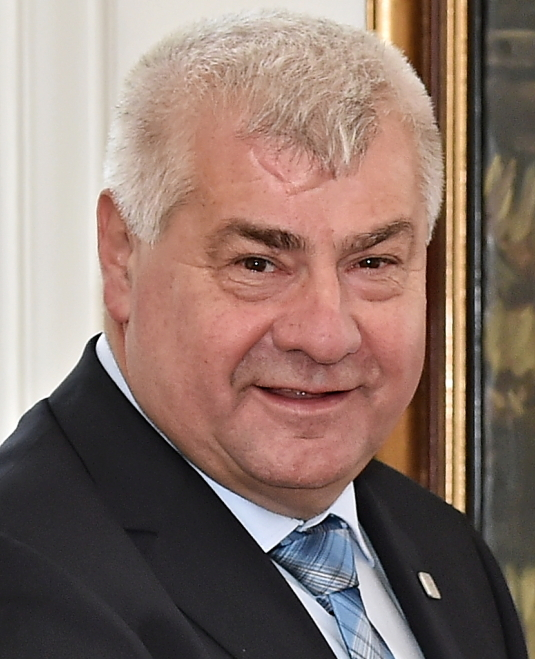
- Érsek in 2016

Minister of Transport and Construction
- In office 31 August 2016 – 20 March 2020
- Prime Minister: Robert Fico; Peter Pellegrini
- Preceded by: Roman Brecely
- Succeeded by: Andrej Doležal

Personal details
- Born: 22 June 1958 (age 68) Bratislava, Czechoslovakia
- Party: Most–Híd
- Spouse: Agáta Érseková
- Children: 2
- Education: Comenius University

Árpád Érsek (born 22 June 1958) is a Slovak politician of Hungarian ethnicity from the former Most–Híd party. He served as the Minister of Transport and Minister of the Environment in 2020.
