= Pavol Pavlis =

Slovak politician

Pavol Pavlis (born 12 January 1961 in Bratislava) is a Slovak politician affiliated with the Direction - Social Democracy (SMER-SD) party. His political career dates from 2006 with an alternate work in the Slovak legislature and in the state administration of the Slovak Republic.

Pavol Pavlis graduated at the Bilíkova Gymnasium in 1980, and in the same year he enrolled in the Faculty of Mechanical Engineering of the Slovak University of Technology in Bratislava with specialization in Automated Systems of Technological Process Management ^{[1]}. During his undergraduate studies he took an internship at the Academy of Sciences in Moscow. He started the professional career at the Research Institute of Computer Sciences based in Žilina in 1984 where he was a researcher and Head of the Department. Subsequently, he worked for SLUVIS, foreign trade company, as Chief Executive Officer - Specialist. Since 1992 he had been engaged in business activities, mainly at Port Service Bratislava, Ltd. as Director of Company. Between 2003 and 2006 he was a member of the Supervisory Board of the National Property Fund of the Slovak Republic.

== Political career ==
Parliamentary Term 2006 - 2010

Pavol Pavlis was nominated for the 15th position on the SMER-SD candidate list in the 2006 Parliamentary Elections ^{[8]} In the National Council of the Slovak Republic (the NR SR) he worked in the Committee on Economic Policy ^{[1]}, and in the National Security Authority Oversight Special Committee as verifier.

Parliamentary Term 2010 - 2012

In the elections to the National Council of the Slovak Republic in March 2010 he was nominated to 27th candidate position for the SMER-SD.^{[9]} He was engaged in the NR SR Committee for Agriculture and Environment ^{[1]}

Ministry of Economy of the Slovak Republic 2012 - 2015

During the Second Cabinet of Robert Fico he served as State Secretary at the Ministry of Economy of the Slovak Republic, and of 2014 as Minister of Economy of the Slovak Republic. At the same time he was a Member of the Board at the Export-Import Bank of the Slovak Republic.

Parliamentary Term 2012 - 2016

After leaving the position of Minister of Economy of the Slovak Republic he served as the Member of the National Council of the Slovak Republic within the 6th Parliamentary Term, to which position he was elected as the 25th candidate for the SMER-SD in 2012.

Parliamentary Term 2016 - 2020

In the elections to the National Council of the Slovak Republic in March 2016, he stood as the 32nd candidate for the SMER-SD.^{[9]} He worked in the NR SR Committee for Economic Affairs.

Office for Standardization, Metrology and Testing SR 2016–Present

On 1 October 2016, the Prime Minister of the Slovak Republic appointed Pavol Pavlis as the President of the Slovak Office of Standards Metrology and Testing.
