= Ľubica Laššáková =

Slovak politician and journalist

Ľubica Laššáková (born 18 August 1960 in Piešťany) was the Minister of Culture of Slovakia, serving from 22 March 2018 to 21 March 2020. She is a member of Direction – Social Democracy. In 2019, she reduced the budgets of LGBT organizations in Slovakia against the advice of the ministry's experts, sparking calls for her resignation.
