= Renáta Zmajkovičová =

Slovak politician

Member of the National Council
- In office 15 October 2002 – 23 March 2016

Personal details
- Born: 9 May 1962 (age 63) Voderady, Czechoslovakia
- Party: Direction – Slovak Social Democracy
- Children: 1
- Education: Matej Bel University

Renáta Zmajkovičová (born 9 May 1962) is a Slovak politician. She served as a member of the National Council from 2002 to 2016 in the caucus of the Direction – Slovak Social Democracy party.

Zmajkovičová was born in 1962 in a village of Voderady, close to the city of Trnava. Before entering politics, she worked in the advertising and fashion industry. In 2007, she obtained a Law degree from Matej Bel University. Her final thesis was a subject of plagiarism allegations due to copying 20 paragraphs of legal text without citing the source. Ján Mikolaj, who at the time served as the minister of Education argued that the thesis is not plagiarized as Zmajkovičová only copied legal text, not original ideas of other authors.

In 2002, Zmajkovičová became an MP. In 2014, she became involved in the a shady purchase of overpriced medical equipment. Although she claimed to be innocent, she did not run again in the 2016 Slovak parliamentary election.

Zmajkovičová is unmarried and has a son.
