= Marek Maďarič =

Slovak politician

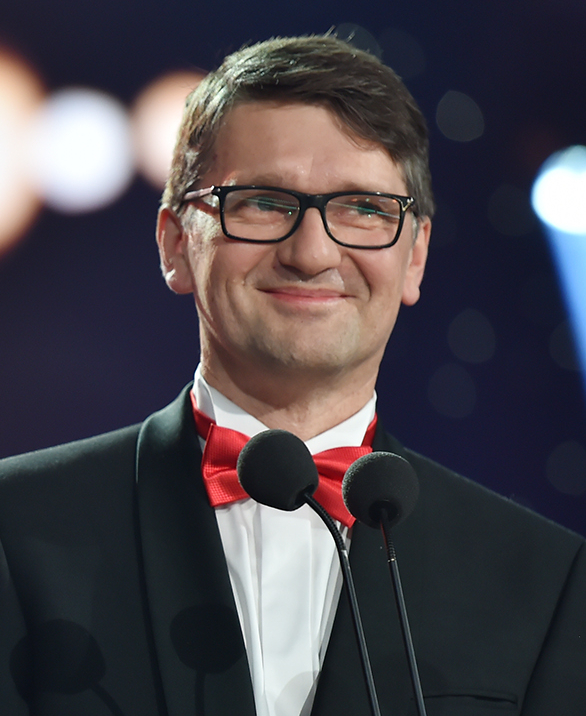
Marek Maďarič

Marek Maďarič (born 23 March 1966 in Bratislava) is a Slovak politician for the Direction - Social Democracy (Slovak: Smer-SD). He was between 4 April 2012 and 28 February 2018 Minister of Culture in Robert Fico's Second and Third Cabinets. Maďarič resigned as minister in the aftermath of the assassination of Ján Kuciak.
