= László Sólymos =

Slovak politician

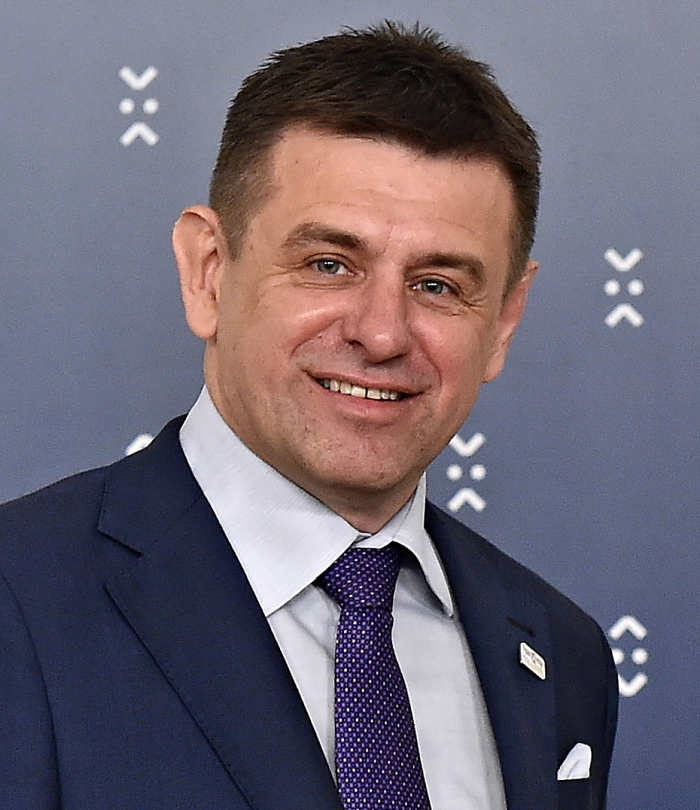
Sólymos in 2016

László Sólymos (born 16 November 1968 in Bratislava) is a Slovak politician of Hungarian ethnicity who was the Minister of Environment of Slovakia from 23 March 2016 to 28 January 2020. He resigned after a drunken incident in a Bratislava restaurant in which he and his brother caused EUR 1,000 in damage, and was replaced by Árpád Érsek from the Most–Híd party, of which Sólymos was a chairman. Later on, he became a chairman of the Most–Híd 2023 party.
