= Most–Híd =

Bridge 2023 Most–Híd 2023
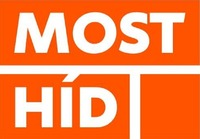
- Chairman: László Sólymos
- Deputy Chairpersons: Attila Agócs; Peter Krajňák; Alžbeta Ozsvaldová; Konrád Rigó
- Founder: Béla Bugár (first); Róbert Glück (second, as MKDA-MKDSZ)
- Founded: 30 June 2009 (first); 14 June 2004 (second, as MKDA-MKDSZ); 18 May 2023 (second, as Most–Híd 2023)
- Dissolved: 2 October 2021 (first); 3 February 2026 (second)
- Split from: Party of the Hungarian Coalition (first); Party of Civic Understanding (second, as MKDA-MKDSZ)
- Preceded by: MKDA-MKDSZ (second, legally)
- Headquarters: Trnavská cesta 37 831 04 Bratislava
- Membership (2020): 5,516 (▼31)
- Ideology: Liberal conservatism; Hungarian minority interests; Pro-Europeanism
- Political position: Centre to centre-right
- National affiliation: Alliance (2021–2023) with Modrí, Most–Híd (2023)
- European affiliation: European People's Party (2013-2021; first); European Free Alliance (2014-2023; second, as MKDA-MKDSZ)
- Colours: Orange
- National Council: 0 / 150
- European Parliament: 0 / 15

Website
- www.mosthid.sk

Most–Híd 2023 (Slovak: [ˈmɔst ˈɦiːt]; Hungarian: [ˈmost ˈhiːd]; from the Slovak and Hungarian words for "bridge") was an inter-ethnic political party in Slovakia. Its programme calls for greater cooperation between the country's Hungarian minority and ethnic Slovak majority. It was one of four parties in the Fico III government coalition, but lost all its seats in the National Council in the 2020 Slovak parliamentary election.

The party was formed in June 2009 by dissidents from the Party of the Hungarian Coalition (SMK-MKP), which they accused of being too nationalistic. Most–Híd seeks to offer an alternative to ethnic politics by promoting inter-ethnic cooperation. Led by the SMK-MKP's former chairman Béla Bugár, the party claimed to have an electorate that is two-thirds ethnic Hungarian and one-third ethnic Slovak. The party remerged with SMK-MKP into a smaller Hungarian minority party (MKÖ-MKS) in late 2021 to form the Alliance, before leaving and joining the party The Blues – European Slovakia, which was named Modrí, Most–Híd for the parliamentary election in 2023.

== History ==
Logo of the first Most–Híd (2009 – 2021)

The party was established on 30 June 2009 by Béla Bugár, Gábor Gál, László A. Nagy (former leader of the MPP/MOS), Tibor Bastrnák and Zsolt Simon, who had previously left the Party of the Hungarian Coalition (SMK-MKP). Béla Bugár, who had also been the president of his former party for 10 years, was elected its president. It was established as an inter-ethnic Hungarian-Slovak alternative to the Party of the Hungarian Coalition. This commitment was cemented by electing Rudolf Chmel, an ethnic Slovak, as one of the party's vice presidents representing.

The party sought to represent the interests of the ethnic Hungarians while working together with the Slovaks. According to Peter Huncik about 60 to 65 percent members were Hungarians, while 35 to 40 were Slovaks. This programme and political ideology manifested itself in the party first taking part in the centre-right Radičová-government between 2010 and 2012, and also cooperating with the centre-left Fico government in minority issues in the next electoral cycle.

Polls from mid-September 2009 gave Most–Híd between 3 and 5.6 percent of the vote. An opinion poll by Focus in May 2010 gave Most–Híd 5.6% of the vote. In the 2010 election, the party received 8.12% of the popular vote, and thus won fourteen seats in the National Council. This, however, included four seats for Civic Conservative Party politicians running within the party's list of candidates. At the same time, Most–Híd's main rival, SMK-MKP, fell short of the 5% threshold and thus did not gain any seats.

In 2010, Most–Híd entered the four-party government of Iveta Radičová, and sought to advance its agenda, including in language rights, citizenship, agriculture and environmental policy. The government, however, turned out to be unstable and finally collapsed during October 2011, leading to snap elections. After months of steady polling between 6 and 9 percents, the party received 6.89% of the popular vote in the 2012 elections, winning 13 seats. As in 2010, SMK-MKP failed to reach the required threshold, leaving Most–Híd as the only parliamentary party representing the interest of the Hungarian minority in Slovakia.

In the 2014 European elections, Most–Híd came in eighth place nationally, receiving 5.83% of the vote and electing 1 MEP.

In the 2016 Slovak parliamentary election, Most–Híd received 6.50% of the vote – 11 seats – and joined Fico's Third Cabinet as a coalition partner.

In the 2019 European election, Most–Híd fell to 2.59% and behind their rival SMK-MKP losing their only MEP. A year later in the 2020 parliamentary election, Most–Híd only got 2.05% losing their representation in parliament.

In 2021 it merged with SMK-MKP into MKÖ-MKS to form Alliance. In 2023, a few months before the election, however they left the united party again over a dispute about allowing former OĽaNO MP György Gyimesi on the list. They regained their status as a party after Hungarian Christian Democratic Alliance (MKDA-MKDSZ), established in 2004, renamed themselves. On 18 May 2023, the Most–Híd party (under the name Most-Híd 2023) announced cooperation with The Blues party. On 25 May 2023, the party was officially renamed to Modrí, Most–Híd for the parliamentary election in 2023.

== Election results ==
=== As Most–Híd ===
==== National Council ====
Election	Votes	%	Seats	+/–	Government
2010	205,538	8.12 (#5)	14 / 150		Coalition
2012	176,088	6.89 (#4)	13 / 150	▼1	Opposition
2016	169,593	6.50 (#7)	11 / 150	▼2	Coalition
2020	59,174	2.05 (#13)	0 / 150	▼11	No seats

==== European Parliament ====
Election	Votes	%	Seats	+/–
2014	32,708	5.83 (#8)	1 / 13	
2019	25,562	2.59 (#11)	0 / 13	▼1

==== Presidential ====
Election	Candidate	First round		Second round		Result
Election	Candidate	Votes	%	Votes	%	Result
2014	Endorsed Pavol Hrušovský	63,298	3.30			Lost
2019	Béla Bugár	66,667	3.10			Lost

=== As MKDA-MKDSZ ===
==== National Council ====
Election	Votes	%	Seats	+/–	Government
2012	3,963	0.16 (#23)	0 / 150		No seats
2016	2,426	0.09 (#21)	0 / 150	0	No seats

==== European Parliament ====
Election	Votes	%	Seats	+/–
2014	1,170	0.21 (#28)	0 / 13	
2019	2,270	0.23 (#23)	0 / 13	0

=== As Most–Híd 2023 ===
==== National Council ====
Election	Votes	%	Seats	+/–	Government
2023	7,935*	0.27* (#15)*	0 / 150		No seats

^{*} the politicians of Most–Híd 2023 ran on The Blues – European Slovakia candidate list, under the name Modrí, Most–Híd.

==== Presidential ====
Election	Candidate	First round		Second round		Result
Election	Candidate	Votes	%	Votes	%	Result
2024	Endorsed Ivan Korčok	958,393	42.5	1,243,709	46.9	Lost
