= Rudolf Filkus =

Slovak politician (1927–2013)

Minister of Finance
- In office 15 March 1994 – 13 December 1994
- Prime Minister: Jozef Moravčík
- Preceded by: Július Tóth
- Succeeded by: Sergej Kozlík

Deputy Speaker of the National Council
- In office 3 November 1994 – 24 September 1998 Serving with Augustín Marián Húska, Marián Andel and Ján Ľupták
- Speaker: Ivan Gašparovič

Member of the National Council
- In office 23 June 1992 – 24 September 1998

Personal details
- Born: 2 September 1927 Bratislava, Czechoslovakia
- Died: 17 December 2013 (aged 86)
- Party: Public Against Violence (1990–91); Movement for a Democratic Slovakia (1991–93); Slovak Democratic Alliance (1993–94); Democratic Union of Slovakia (1994–95)
- Education: Bratislava University of Economics and Business

Rudolf Filkus (2 September 1927 – 17 December 2013) was a Slovak politician. He died at the age of 86.

Rudolf Filkus was born on 2 September 1927 in Bratislava.

He served as the Minister of Finance from 16 March 1994 to 13 December 1994.
