= Mojmír Mamojka =

Slovak jurist and politician

Member of the National Council
- In office 4 July 2006 – 23 March 2016

Personal details
- Born: 29 July 1950 (age 75) Zvolen, Czechoslovakia
- Party: Direction – Slovak Social Democracy
- Education: Comenius University

Mojmír Mamojka (born 29 July 1950) is a Slovak jurist, academic and politician. He was a Member of the National Council for Direction – Slovak Social Democracy from 2006 to 2016. In 2017, he was appointed a judge of the Constitutional Court of Slovakia. In 2020, he was forced to resign from the court due to suspicions of being in contact with the sentenced fraudster Marián Kočner.

== Academic career ==
Mamjoka studied law at the Comenius University. After graduating in 1973, he worked as a lawyer at the Ministry of Finance and from 1977 to 1985 pursued a Candidature. In 1985 he became Assistant Professor at the Faculty of Law Comenius University, where he became the Dean from 1997 to 2003. In 2003 he founded a new Law Faculty at the Matej Bel University and became its Dean. In 2006 he became the Dean at the Danubius University. During his tenure, several prominent Czech politicians, including his personal friend Michal Hašek, received law degrees from the university without a proof of having actually studied law, leading to large-scale criticism of the university in the Czech Republic. In 2014, he again became the Dean at the Matej Bel University, where he returned in 2020 after his resignation from the Constitutional Court. As of 2022, he still teaches there.

== Public career ==
Between 2006 and 2016 Mamojka served as an MP in the caucus of Direction – Slovak Social Democracy. As an MP, he kept a rather low profile, although he was widely criticized by Slovak academics for attempting to reform accreditation in a way that would lower requirements, a change that would benefit the Danubius University, where he was active at the time.

In 2015, Mamojka was nominated by the parliament for the vacant position of a judge at the Constitutional court. The president Andrej Kiska resisted the nomination, due to Mamojka's political background, but relented after 2017 Constitutional court ruling stating that the president must pick the judges from the nominees of the parliament. On 14 December 2017, Mamojka became a judge along with Miroslav Duriš and fellow MP Jana Laššáková.

In May 2020, information about Mamojka's alleged contacts with the sentenced fraudster Marián Kočner became public. The information was particularly damaging for Mamojka, who was the judge responsible for the decision about Kočner's appeal against his imprisonment. Mamojka rejected the allegations, but resigned his judgeship due to "media pressure and health issues".
