= Marián Jusko =

Former Governor of National Bank of Slovakia

Governor of National Bank of Slovakia
- In office 30 July 1999 – 31 December 2004
- Preceded by: Vladimír Masár
- Succeeded by: Ivan Šramko

Personal details
- Born: 24 March 1956 (age 70) Prešov, Czechoslovakia (now Slovakia)
- Education: University of Economics, Bratislava
- Profession: Banker, Manager

Marián Jusko (born 24 March 1956 in Prešov, Czechoslovakia) served as the governor of National Bank of Slovakia since July 1999 to December 2004. Being a deputy of his predecessor, governor Masár, Jusko's appointment was generally seen as a representative of continuity in the governance of the bank. As a governor, Jusko focused on building the credibility of the institution in order to preserve the public trust in the National Bank of Slovakia, which had been damaged by big profile failures of several state-owned banks.

== Career ==
Marián Jusko started his professional life as an academic at the University of Economics in Bratislava in the 1980s. In 1991, he became a Deputy Minister of Privatization under Ivan Mikloš. Following its establishment, Jusko joined the National Bank of Slovakia, serving as a Member of its Governing Board and Deputy Governor between 1994 and 1999. After the end of his term as the governor, Jusko served as the chairman of the board at Slovnaft between 2005 and 2009. in 2007, he became the Chairman of the National Union of Employers, a position he retired from in 2015.

Preceded by Vladimír Masár	Governor of the National Bank of Slovakia; 1999–2004	Succeeded by Ivan Šramko
