= List of ministers of finance of Slovakia =

This is a list of ministers of finance of Slovakia since independence:

- Július Tóth, 1 January 1993 - 14 March 1994
- Rudolf Filkus, 16 March 1994 - 13 December 1994
- Sergej Kozlík, 13 December 1994 - 14 January 1998
- Miroslav Maxon, 14 January 1998 - 29 October 1998
- Brigita Schmögnerová, 30 October 1998 - 28 January 2002
- František Hajnovič, 29 January 2002 - 15 October 2002
- Ivan Mikloš, 16 October 2002 - 4 July 2006
- Ján Počiatek, 4 July 2006 - 8 July 2010
- Ivan Mikloš, 9 July 2010 - 4 April 2012
- Peter Kažimír, 4 April 2012 - 11 April 2019
- Ladislav Kamenický, 7 May 2019 - 21 March 2020
- Eduard Heger, 21 March 2020 - 1 April 2021
- Igor Matovič, 1 April 2021 - 23 December 2022
- Eduard Heger, 23 December 2022 - 13 May 2023
- Michal Horváth, 15 May 2023 - 25 October 2023
- Ladislav Kamenický 25 October 2023 -

== See also ==
- Economy of Slovakia
