= Ladislav Kamenický =

Slovak politician

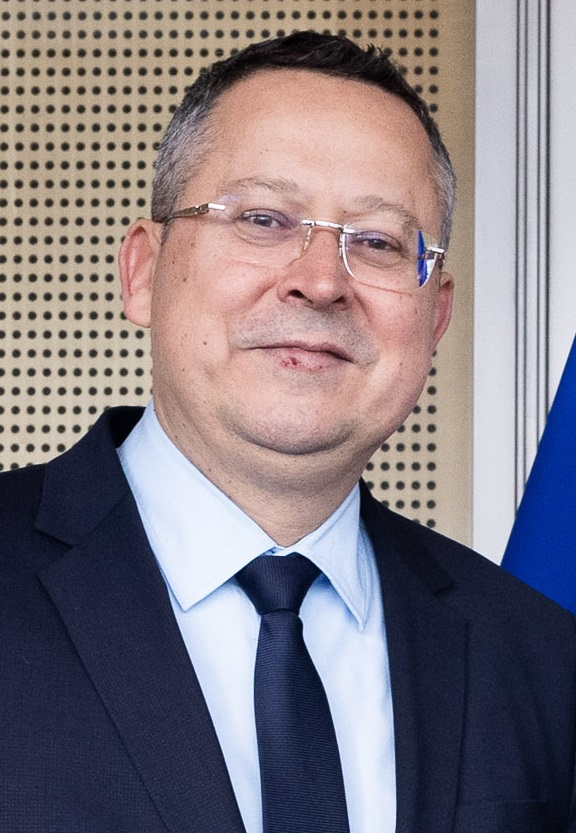
- Kamenický in 2024

Minister of Finance
- Incumbent
- Assumed office 25 October 2023
- Prime Minister: Robert Fico
- Preceded by: Michal Horváth
- In office 7 May 2019 – 21 March 2020
- Prime Minister: Peter Pellegrini
- Preceded by: Peter Pellegrini (acting)
- Succeeded by: Eduard Heger

Member of the National Council
- In office 21 March 2020 – 25 October 2023
- In office 4 April 2012 – 7 May 2019

Personal details
- Born: 4 October 1970 (age 56)
- Party: Direction – Social Democracy
- Education: University of Economics in Bratislava (Ing.)

Ladislav Kamenický (born 4 October 1970) is the Minister of Finance since 2023. He had previously served as the Finance Minister from 2019 to 2020. From 2012 to 2019 and again from 2020 to 2023 he was an MP of the National Council of Slovakia for Direction – Slovak Social Democracy (Smer-SD).

Ladislav Kamenický graduated from the University of Economics in Bratislava. In 2012 he became an MP of the National Council of Slovakia. As an MP, is seen as polite and staunchly loyal to the leadership of Smer-SD's Chairman and Kamenický's personal friend Robert Fico . In 2019 he became the Minister of Finance, filling the seat emptied after the previous minister Peter Kažimír became the Central Bank Governor. The choice of Kamenický was seen as a compromise between various factions of Smer-SD. After the defeat of SMER-SD in the 2020 Slovak parliamentary election, Kamenický returned to the parliament.

Kamenický is an art connoisseur.
