= Húska =

Hrdý; feminine form Húsková is a Slovak surname. It is derived from the Slovak word húska for "little goose".

People with the name include:

- Adam Húska (born 1997), Slovak ice hockey player
- Dávid Húska (born 2003), Slovak footballer
- Augustín Marián Húska (1929–2016), Slovak politician
- Ryan Huska (born 1975), Canadian ice hockey coach and player
