= Richard Glück =

Slovak politician (born 1992)

Member of the National Council
- Incumbent
- Assumed office 7 February 2024

Personal details
- Born: 8 February 1992 (age 34) Košice, Czechoslovakia
- Party: Direction – Social Democracy
- Education: Danubius University; Pavol Jozef Šafárik University

Richard Glück (born 8 November 1992) is a Slovak politician. Since 2024 he has served as a Member of the National Council of Slovakia.

== Biography ==
Richard Glück was born on 8 November 1992 in Košice. He studied law at the Danubius University and Pavol Jozef Šafárik University. Gluck became publicly known in October 2023 when he punched the former prime minister Igor Matovič in the face at a rally of Direction – Social Democracy (SMER) party in Bratislava. At the time of the attack, he was employed by the Labor Inspectorate.

=== Political career ===
Glück failed to win a seat in the 2023 Slovak parliamentary election but came in the parliament in February 2024 as a replacement for Martin Nemky who resigned on his seat to become the chair of the Statistical Office. Immediately after becoming an MP, Glück defended shortening of statute of limitations for a range of crimes, including rape, by arguing women "sometimes make up rape allegations".

Together with fellow SMER MPs Ján Mažgút and Igor Melicher and the MEP Erik Kaliňák, he forms an informal group journalist dubbed "The wolves of SMER" due their aggressive communication.

In August 2025, Glück and Erik Kaliňák met the manosphere influencers Tate brothers. The Jewish community of Slovakia denounced the meeting pointing the brothers are well known for their misogyny.

== Views ==
Glück has advocated closer relations with Russia. In January 2025 he was a part of a delegation of Slovak MPs to Russian Duma. He opposed mask mandates and COVID vaccination.
