= Ivan Šramko =

Governor of the National Bank of Slovakia from 2005 to 2010

Governor of National Bank of Slovakia
- In office 1 January 2005 – 11 January 2010
- Preceded by: Marián Jusko
- Succeeded by: Jozef Makúch

Personal details
- Born: 3 September 1957 (age 69) Bratislava, Czechoslovakia
- Education: University of Economics, Bratislava
- Profession: Banker

Ivan Šramko (born 3 September 1957) served as the governor of National Bank of Slovakia since January 2005 to January 2010. Šramko is notable for overseeing Slovakia's adoption of the Euro currency in 2009. As a governor, he was considered an inflation hawk.

== Career ==
Ivan Šramko was born on 3 September 1957 in Bratislava. He studied at the University of Economics in Bratislava, graduating in 1980 in Management.

In the 1990s, Šramko served on managing boards of various Slovak banks. Šramko joined the Board of the National Bank of Slovakia in 2002 as Deputy Governor and was appointed governor effective 1 January 2005.

After the end of his term as the governor he was appointed the ambassador of Slovakia to the OECD. Between 2012 and 2020 he served as the Chairman of the Council for Budget Responsibility.

== Awards and recognition ==
In 2026, Šramko was awarded the Order of Ľudovít Štúr, 1st class by pre president of Slovakia, Peter Pellegrini for his contributions to economic governance in Slovakia.
