= Ján Počiatek =

Slovak politician

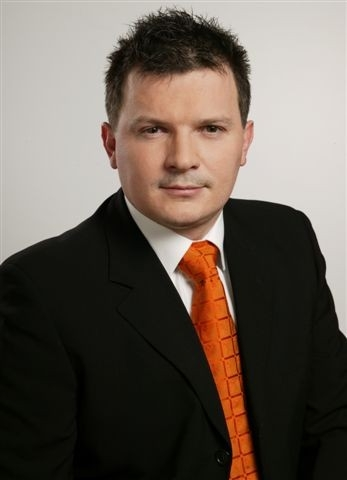
Ján Počiatek

Ján Počiatek (born 16 September 1970) is a Slovak politician.

== Early life and education ==
Počiatek speaks English fluently and also has an advanced knowledge of German and Russian. Počiatek is a graduate of the University of Economics in Bratislava. He graduated in 1997 as a qualified engineer in economics.

== Career ==
Počiatek served as Minister of Finance from 2006 to 2010, and as Minister of Transport, Construction, and Regional Development from 2012 to 2016, both in the government of Prime Minister Robert Fico. Under his leadership, Slovakia agreed a 1.9-billion-euro ($2.1 billion) public-private partnership for a consortium led by Spanish infrastructure group Ferrovial’s Cintra unit to build two highways in the capital Bratislava.

== Other activities ==
- European Bank for Reconstruction and Development (EBRD), Ex-Officio Member of the Board of Governors (2006-2010)
- European Investment Bank (EIB), Ex-Officio Member of the Board of Governors (2006-2010)

== Recognition ==
For his contribution in preparing Slovakia's entry into the Eurozone, the international financial affairs publication The Banker named Počiatek as the "Best finance minister for the year 2008 in Europe."

== Controversy ==
Počiatek caused controversy when he participated in a yacht trip on the Mediterranean organised by a private equity group accused of profiting from currency speculation before the koruna was revalued against the euro in May 2008. Pociatek denied wrongdoing but later apologised.

By late 2008, opposition pressure was mounting again to dismiss Počiatek over his alleged mishandling of a court case involving state-owned lottery company Tipos.

In 2019 video of Počiatek recorded through a candid camera in the prosecutor general's office (Dobroslav Trnka) was leaked, in this video Počiatek openly discussed and joked about corruption skills of Slovak National Party leader Ján Slota, and discussed with Trnka how to cover up the Tipos mishandling.

== See also ==
- National Bank of Slovakia
- Economy of Slovakia
- Slovak koruna former currency of the Slovak Republic
- Slovak euro coins current currency in Slovakia
- Ľubomír Jahnátek Minister of Economy of the Slovak Republic
