= Social Democratic Alternative =

Political party in Slovakia

The Social Democratic Alternative (Slovak: Sociálnodemokratická alternatíva) was a political party in Slovakia.

In 2001 the Party of the Democratic Left (SDL) more and more turned away from the Dzurinda-government – the then finance minister Brigita Schmögnerová and other popular politicians from the social-liberal wing of the SDL (like Peter Weiss and Milan Ftáčnik) the SDL to found a "modern, anti-nationalist and anti-populist" party. At the last legislative elections, 20 and 21 September 2002, the party won 1.8% of the popular vote and no seats. It merged with the SMER party as from January 2005.
