= Vladimír Masár =

Former Governor of National Bank of Slovakia

Governor of National Bank of Slovakia
- In office 29 July 1993 – 29 July 1999
- Preceded by: Office created Deputy Governor Marián Tkáč acted as the interim Governor between 1 January and 29 July 1993
- Succeeded by: Marián Jusko

Personal details
- Born: 2 May 1958 (age 68) Partizánske, Czechoslovakia (now Slovakia)
- Education: University of Economics, Bratislava
- Profession: Banker, Manager

Vladimír Masár (born 2 May 1958 in Partizánske, Czechoslovakia) served as the first Governor of National Bank of Slovakia between 1993 and 1999. As the first Central Bank governor of a newly independent Slovakia, he was in charge of introducing a stabilizing a new currency - the Slovak crown and building up a professional apparatus and international contacts at the National Bank of Slovakia from the scratch. As a governor, he continued the conservative tradition of Czechoslovak monetary policy and prevented monetary turmoil despite irresponsible fiscal policies of Mečiar's government.

== Career ==
After graduating from the University of Economics in Bratislava in 1988 he worked in several commercial banks before becoming deputy Finance minister of the newly founded Slovak Republic. He was chairman of the preparatory commission for the establishment of the National Bank of Slovakia and became its first governor. After the end of his term as a Governor, he became a chairman of the Slovak branch of Deloitte. In May 2020 he retired upon reaching the mandatory retirement age for partners at Deloitte of 62 years.

== Controversy ==
Shortly before Masár's retirement, Deloitte faced accusations by several high-profile politicians, including the Economy Minister Richard Sulík, of facilitating siphoning away public money. Masár denied all allegations.

| Preceded by incumbent | Governor of the National Bank of Slovakia; 1993–1999 | Succeeded by Marián Jusko |
