= Peter Kažimír =

Slovak economist and politician (born 1968)

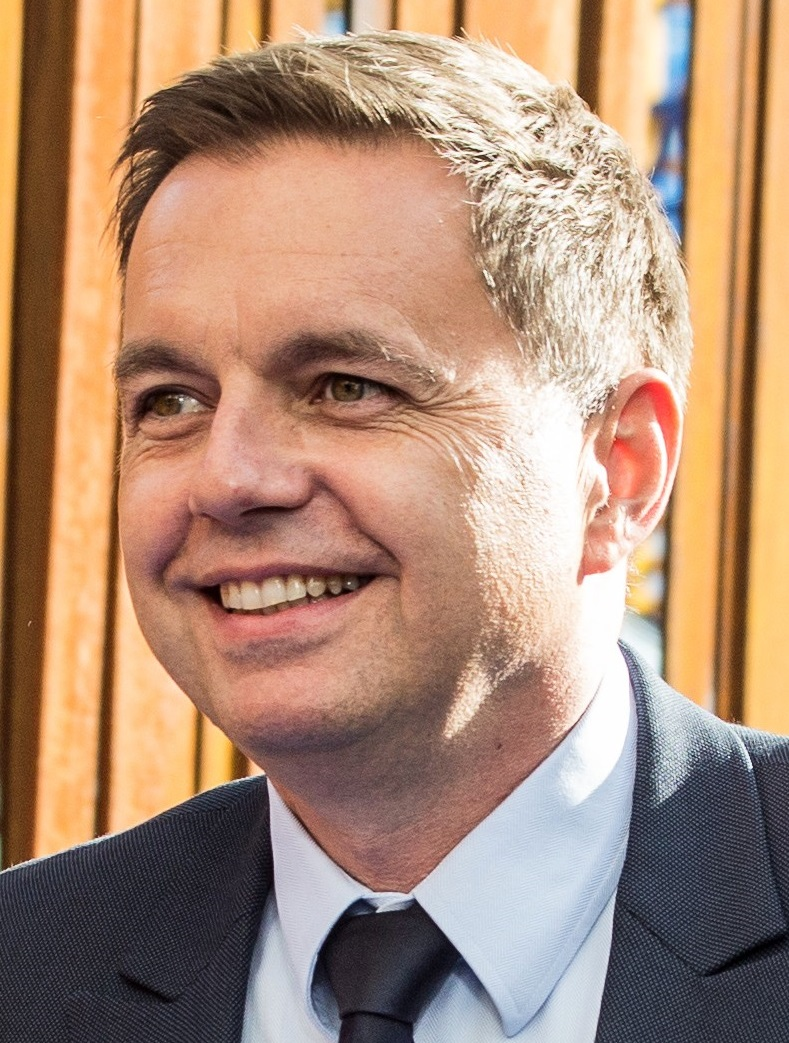

Governor of National Bank of Slovakia
- Incumbent
- Assumed office 1 June 2019
- Preceded by: Jozef Makúch

Minister of Finance
- In office 4 April 2012 – 11 April 2019
- Prime Minister: Robert Fico; Peter Pellegrini
- Preceded by: Ivan Mikloš
- Succeeded by: Peter Pellegrini (acting); Ladislav Kamenický

Deputy Prime Minister of Slovakia
- In office 4 April 2012 – 23 March 2016
- Prime Minister: Robert Fico

Personal details
- Born: 28 June 1968 (age 57) Košice, Czechoslovakia (now Slovakia)
- Party: Independent (2019-present)
- Other political affiliations: Direction – Social Democracy (Until 2019)
- Domestic partner: Katarína Korecká
- Children: 2
- Education: University of Economics in Bratislava

Peter Kažimír (born 28 June 1968) is a Slovak economist and former politician who is currently serving as the governor of the National Bank of Slovakia (NBS). He previously served as the country's Finance Minister under prime ministers Robert Fico and Peter Pellegrini. He was a senior member of the social-democratic SMER-SD party, but left the party after assuming the governorship of NBS.

== Early life ==
Kažimír studied International Commerce at the University of Economics in Bratislava. After graduation, he worked in the private sector as a tax advisor at the firm Schubert & partners. Since early 2000s, he held board-level executive positions at various companies, including VIVANT, Sceptrum Brno, PARTA – GAS, MATTI and DDP Credit Suisse Life & Pensions.

== Political career ==
=== State Secretary and MP ===
In 2006, Kažimír became the State Secretary at the Ministry of Finance. At the same time, he sat on the board of National Nuclear Fund for Decommissioning of Nuclear Installations (NJF). Following the defeat of Direction-Social Democracy (SMER-SD) in 2010 Slovak parliamentary election, Kažimír shortly served as MP. After 2012 Slovak parliamentary election when SMER-SD returned to power, Kažimír became the Minister of Finance.

=== Minister of Finance ===
In 2015, Kažimír was part of a team that secured the investment of Jaguar Land Rover in a £1bn plant, beating off stiff competition from Poland and Mexico.

According to Financial Times, Kažimír developed a strong record on managing Slovakia's public finances since taking office. He earned respect for keeping budget deficits under control and became known for his tough stance in the Eurozone's negotiations with debt-plagued Greece.

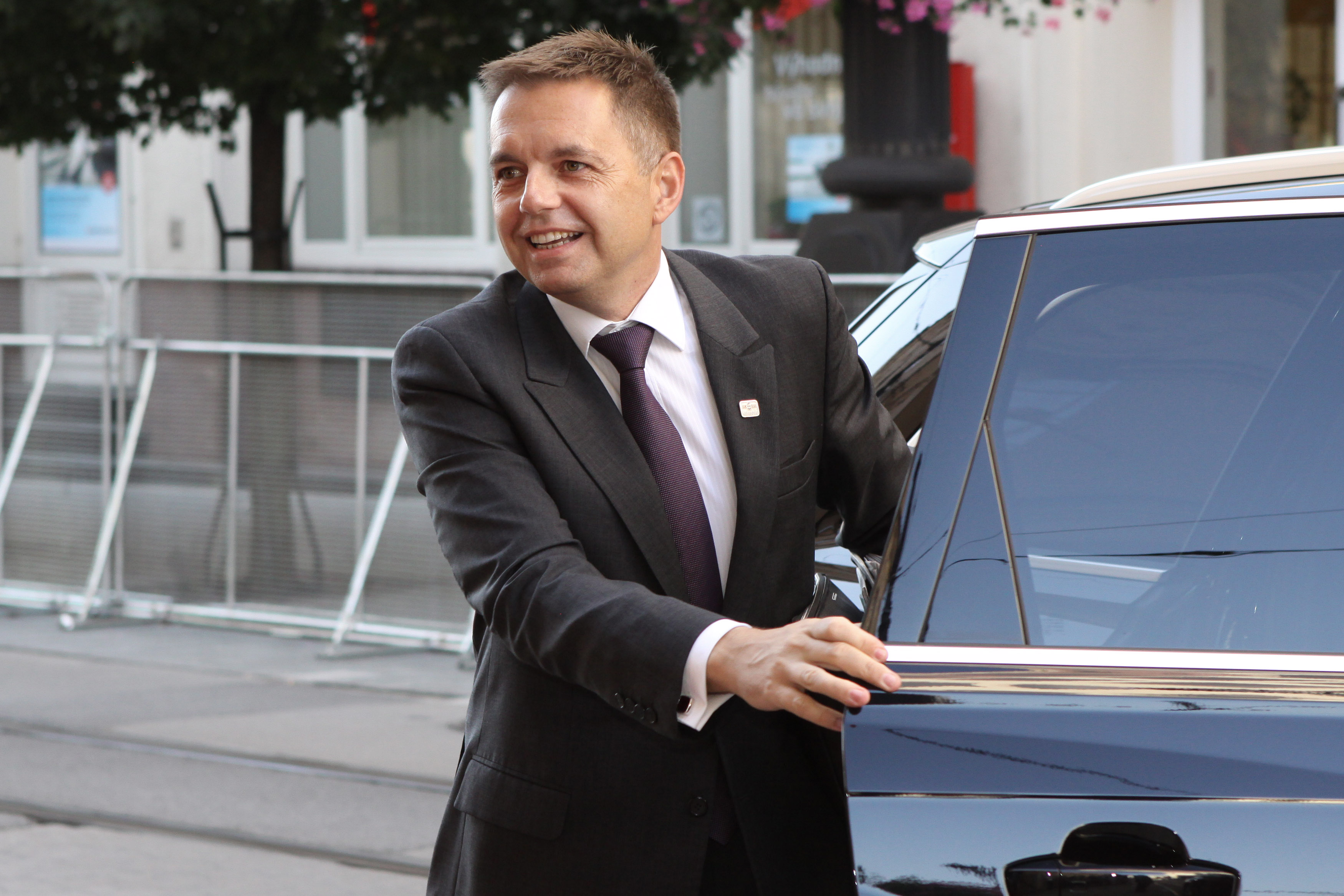
Kažimír arriving at a Eurogroup meeting in 2016

By November 2017, Kažimír submitted his formal application for succeeding Jeroen Dijsselbloem as the next chairman of the Eurogroup. During the vote on 4 December, he withdrew after the first round and Mário Centeno was eventually elected to the post.

Kažimír was accused of paying a 48,000 euro ($54,000)-bribe in 2017-18 to the head of the national tax office over a tax audit of private firms. However, the supreme court spared him from trial. On May 29, 2025 he was convicted of bribery and fined €200,000.

== Central Bank Governorship ==
In December 2019, the National Council approved Kažimír as the government's nominee to succeed Jozef Makúch in the office of the president of the National Bank of Slovakia. He took up the post on 1 June 2019.

=== International organizations ===
- European Bank for Reconstruction and Development (EBRD), Ex-Officio Member of the Board of Governors (2012–2019)
- Multilateral Investment Guarantee Agency (MIGA), World Bank Group, Ex-Officio Member of the Board of Governors (2012–2019) Multilateral Investment Guarantee Agency (MIGA), World Bank Group.
- World Bank, Ex-Officio Member of the Board of Governors (2012–2019)

== Personal life ==
Kažimír has been married to Katarína Korecká since 2008. They have two children together.

Preceded by Jozef Makúch	Governor of the National Bank of Slovakia; 2019-present	Succeeded by Incumbent
