= Jozef Makúch =

Governor of National Bank of Slovakia

Governor of National Bank of Slovakia
- In office 12 January 2010 – 1 June 2019
- Preceded by: Ivan Šramko
- Succeeded by: Peter Kažimír

Personal details
- Born: 26 August 1953 (age 73) Podhájska, Czechoslovakia
- Education: University of Economics, Bratislava
- Profession: Banker

Jozef Makúch (born 26 August 1953 in Podhájska, Czechoslovakia) was the Governor of National Bank of Slovakia since January 2010 to June 2019. Makúch quit ahead of the end of his second mandate in January 2021, citing concerns about central bank independence he deemed threatened by the "political wrangling" he expected to follow the 2020 Slovak parliamentary election.

== Career ==
Makúch studied at the University of Economics in Bratislava, graduating in 1976 in Economics. In 1985 he completed his postgraduate studies.

Makúch worked at the National Bank of Slovakia's predecessor Czechoslovak State Bank since 1989. Upon independence of Slovakia he became a member of the newly founded Central Bank's Governing Board. In 2000 he left the National Bank of Slovakia to lead the Financial Markets Authority. He rejoined the bank again in 2006 when the institution was merged with the Central Bank and again became a board member. He was named Bank's governor in 2010 by the President of Slovakia.

== NBS Governor ==
Makúch was an ex-officio member of the Governing Council of the European Central Bank, of the General Board of the European Systemic Risk Board, a Governor of the International Monetary Fund and an Alternate Governor of the European Bank for Reconstruction and Development.

Preceded by Ivan Šramko	Governor of the National Bank of Slovakia; 2010–2019	Succeeded by Peter Kažimír
