= Ondrašovce =

- Municipality
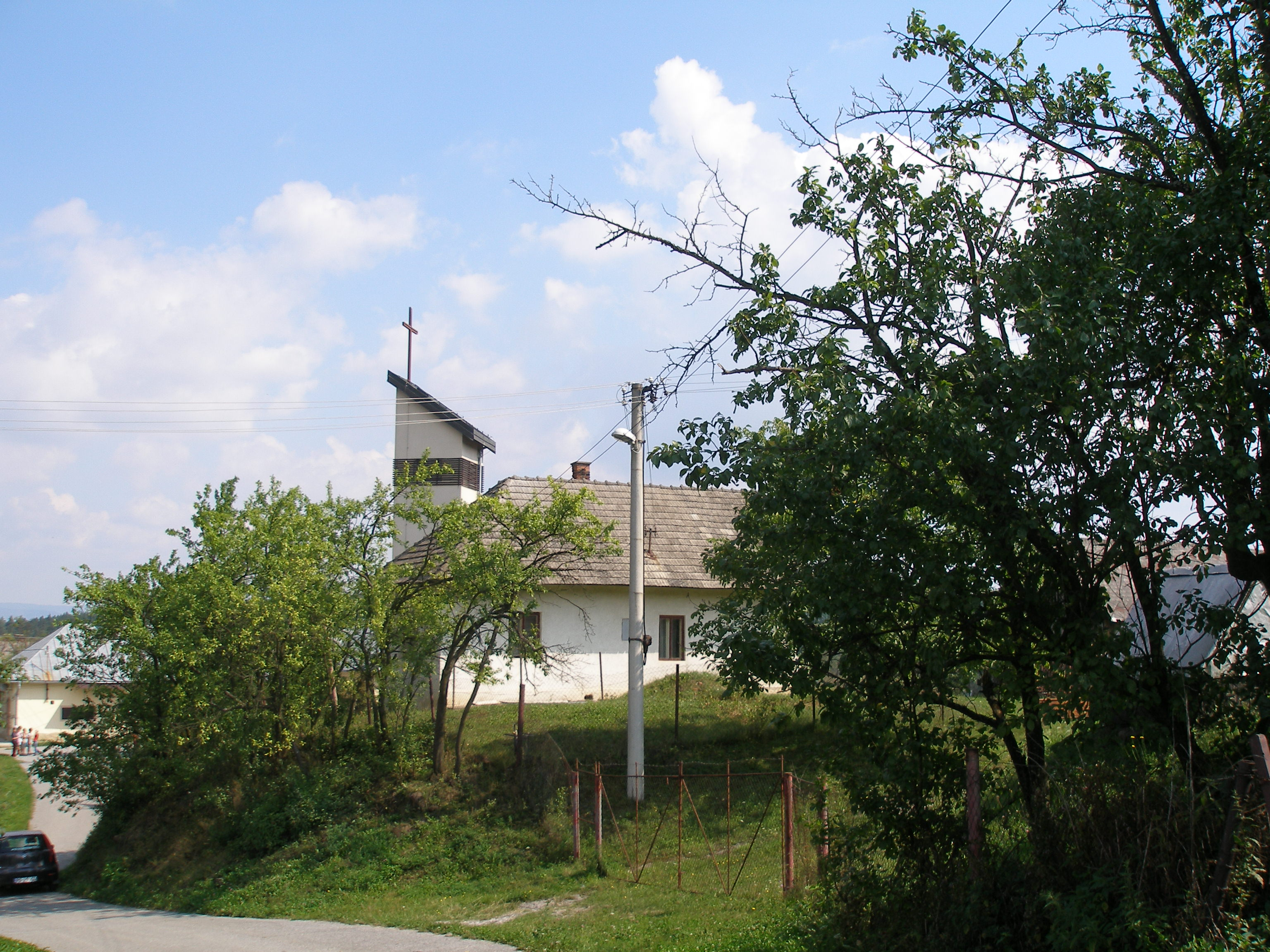

- Flag

- Location of Ondrašovce in the Prešov Region Location of Ondrašovce in Slovakia
- Coordinates: 48.98°N 21.08°E
- Country: Slovakia
- Region: Prešov Region
- District: Prešov District
- First mentioned: 1427

Government
  - Mayor: Jozef Lopuchovský (Smer-SD)

Area
  - Total: 4.35 km^{2} (1.68 sq mi)
- Elevation: 468 m (1,535 ft)

Population (2025)
  - Total: 62
- Time zone: UTC+1 (CET)
  - Summer (DST): UTC+2 (CEST)
- Postal code: 823 3
- Area code: +421 51
- Vehicle registration plate (until 2022): PO

Ondrašovce (Hungarian: Andrásvágás) is a village and municipality in the Prešov District of the Prešov Region of eastern Slovakia.

== History ==
In the historical records the village was first mentioned in 1427.

== Geography ==
The municipality lies at an altitude of 468 metres (1,535 ft) and covers an area of 4.35 km^{2} (1.68 sq mi) (2025).

== Population ==
Population statistic (10 years)
Year	1995	2005	2015	2025
Count	61	64	58	62
Difference		+4.91%	−9.37%	+6.89%

Population statistic
Year	2024	2025
Count	59	62
Difference		+5.08%

It has a population of 62 people (31 December 2025).

=== Ethnicity ===
Census 2021 (1+ %)
Ethnicity	Number	Fraction
Slovak	60	100%
Total	60	

In year 2021 was 60 people by ethnicity 60 as Slovak.

Note on population: The difference values of population numbers in the table "Population statistic" and in the sections "Ethnicity" & "Religion" is caused by the use of various statistical methods.

=== Religion ===
Census 2021 (1+ %)
Religion	Number	Fraction
Roman Catholic Church	52	86.67%
Greek Catholic Church	6	10%
Evangelical Church	1	1.67%
None	1	1.67%
Total	60	

In year 2021 was 60 people by religion 52 from Roman Catholic Church, 6 from Greek Catholic Church, 1 from Evangelical Church and 1 from None.
