= Thasbalta =

File:Roman Empire - Africa Proconsularis (125 AD).

Thasbalta was a city and Catholic diocese in the Roman province of Africa proconsularis during the Roman Empire and of Byzacena during late antiquity. The exact location of this city is unknown but it was in the Oued es Segui river valley, north of Tozeur in the Sahel region of Tunisia.

Thasbalta (Italian: Tasbalta) was also the seat of a former Christian bishopric of the Roman Catholic Church which survives today as a titular bishopric (Dioecesis Thasbaltensis)

The most recent bishop was Štefan Vrablec, former Auxiliary Bishop of Bratislava-Trnava, who died in 2017.
