= Jozef Šesták =

Slovak diplomat

Ambassador Jozef Šesták
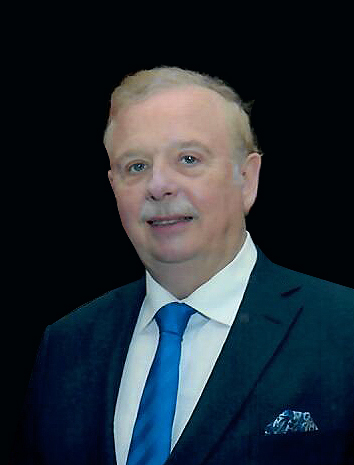

Ambassador, the Consul General of the Slovak Republic in Istanbul
- In office December 2009 – December 2018

Ambassador, Ambassador at Large, Senior State Counsellor at the Ministry of Foreign Affairs of the Slovak Republic
- In office 1999–2009

Chief negotiator for the accession of the Slovak Republic into the European Union
- In office 1997–1998

State Secretary at the Ministry of Foreign Affairs of the Slovak Republic
- In office 1994–1998

Personal details
- Born: 9 November 1945 Michalovce, Czechoslovakia
- Spouse: Anna Šestáková
- Children: 2
- Education: University of Economics in Bratislava

Jozef Šesták is a Slovak diplomat and expert on international negotiations in the field of foreign policy and diplomacy. He previously served as State Secretary of the Ministry of Foreign Affairs of the Slovak Republic.

== Early life and education ==
He spent his childhood and youth in Košice. He studied at the University of Economics in Bratislava, the Economy of Foreign Trade. In 1965, at the university he has founded AIESEC (International Association of the Students of Economics and Commerce), becoming the vice-president of AIESEC Czechoslovakia and the first President of AIESEC Slovakia at the University of Economics in Bratislava (1965–67). He was a co-founder and the first vice-president of the University Students Union of Slovakia (ZVS, 1968–69). He received the PhD. degree in 1985 at the University of Economics in Bratislava. During the so-called Prague Spring, he was one of the progressive leaders of the student movement in Slovakia.

== Professional career ==
=== In Czechoslovakia ===
As a foreign trade graduate of the University of Economics in Bratislava, he started to work at the Ministry of Trade of the Slovak Republic (1970), later at the Federal Ministry of Foreign Trade in Prague (1972-1979). In 1974–1979, he served as the Deputy Commercial Attaché at the Embassy of the Czechoslovak Socialist Republic (ČSSR) in Washington D.C., USA. In 1979, after returning home, he was transferred to the Federal Ministry of Foreign Affairs of ČSSR in Prague, where he worked at the Minister's office. In 1983, he received position of the Ambassadorial Counsellor to the Permanent Mission of the ČSSR at the international organisations in Vienna, Austria. He served as the Deputy Head of the Czechoslovak Delegation at the disarmament negotiations on Reduction of the Conventional Forces in Central Europe (MBFR) (1983-1988). As an expert he joined the negotiations on the withdrawal of the Soviet troops from the territory of the ČSSR (1990). Also in 1990, he was the Head of the Delegation of the Czech and Slovak Federative Republic with the diplomatic rank of the Ambassador at the international negotiations on Open skies regime in Canada and Hungary.

=== In Slovakia ===
After the establishment of the government of the Slovak Republic, he acted as an external Counsellor to the first Deputy Prime Minister of the Slovak Republic for foreign policy and international economic questions (1990-1991). As early as during the federative arrangement of Czechoslovakia, he initiated foundation of the Ministry of International Relations in Bratislava, Slovakia to become the first department of the Slovak Diplomacy.

In December 1994, the cabinet of the prime minister Vladimir Mečiar appointed him as the State Secretary of the Ministry of Foreign Affairs of the Slovak Republic (1994-1998). Within this position, he was the author of the Economic Dimension of Diplomacy (EDD) which he introduced in 1995 as a new orientation of diplomacy toward economy and trade. In 1996 and 1997, he organised in Bratislava two world conferences on the subject of economic dimension of diplomacy for the senior representatives of the ministries of foreign affairs from over 50 countries, where the keynote speaker was Hans-Dietrich Genscher, then foreign affairs minister of Germany.

He has reached an important diplomatic achievement by successful negotiations of the Treaty on Good Neighbourly Relations and Friendly Cooperation between the Slovak Republic and the Republic of Hungary (signed in Paris on 19 March 1995) in which he acted as the leader of the governmental negotiation team of Slovakia. He played an important role as the Head of the negotiating team of the Government of the Slovak Republic in the negotiations with the Republic of Hungary about a possible off-court settlement of the dispute regarding the Gabčíkovo – Nagymaros Waterworks (1996–97).

As the state secretary of the Ministry of Foreign Affairs, he worked also as the Deputy Chairman of the Government Council for the Promotion of Export. He was a member of the Government Council for the integration of the Slovak Republic into the European Union as well as a member of the Government Council for the accession of the Slovak Republic into OECD. He was the first Chief negotiator for the accession of Slovakia into the EU (1997–98). He led the access negotiations of the SR into NATO.

In the autumn of 1998, he became the Extraordinary and Plenipotentiary Ambassador of the Slovak Republic in the Republic of Austria. In spite of being a career diplomat, he was removed from the office after the commencement of the prime minister Mikuláš Dzurinda's cabinet.

In 1999–2009, he worked at the Ministry of Foreign Affairs of the SR, ranked as Ambassador, Ambassador at Large and Senior State Counsellor.

He is the author of the peace project for the solution of the Middle East crisis, which he presented in Brussels to the experts of the European Commission on Middle East (in 2005) and to the Austrian Presidency of the EU (in 2006). The initiative of Ambassador Jozef Šesták was appreciated by the High Representative for the Common Foreign and Security Policy of the European Union, Mr. Javier Solana, on 25 February 2005.

In 2004, he was an independent candidate in the presidential elections in the Slovak Republic.

From December 2009 until December 2018, he served as the Consul General of the Slovak Republic in Istanbul with the rank of Ambassador. In 2016–2018, he was the Dean (Doyen) of the Istanbul Consular Corps (ICC), which is the largest consular corps in the world. During his stay in Istanbul, he established and organised a systematic scientific-research cooperation between the top scientists of Slovakia and Turkey, for which he was awarded the Medal of the Slovak Academy of Sciences for the support of science by the Scientific Council of the Slovak Academy of Sciences (in 2016).

In the present, he devotes himself mostly to the issues of the Art of the International Negotiations in the Foreign Policy and Diplomacy. He is visiting lecturer at the prestige private KOC University in Istanbul.

In May 2023, the publishing house VEDA of the Slovak Academy of Sciences published a book of Šesták's memoirs entitled Diplomat, my missions and stories. It was officially launched on 1 June 2023. The book is non-fiction and presents information and documents that have not yet been published.

His wife, Anna Šestáková, is a niece of Slovak writer Dobroslav Chrobák. She is a university lecturer and an expert on diplomatic protocol, etiquette and the history of diplomacy.

== Honorary Posts ==
- 2016 – 2018: Dean (Doyen) of the Istanbul Consular Corps (ICC); the largest consular corps in the world, consisting of approximately 150 consuls general and honorary consuls in Istanbul
- 2014 – 2016: Chairman of the executive committee of the Istanbul Consular Corps (ICC)
- 2004: Independent presidential candidate in the elections of the President of the Slovak Republic
- 2000 – 2002: Honorary Member of the Academic Board of the Faculty of Trade of the University of Economics in Bratislava, Slovakia
- 1997 – 2000: Member of the Academic Board of the Faculty of Trade of the University of Economics in Bratislava, Slovakia
- 1965 – 1967: Founding member of AIESEC Slovakia, the first President of AIESEC Slovakia at the University of Economics in Bratislava, Slovakia and the first vice-president of AIESEC Czechoslovakia
