= František Hajnovič =

Slovak economist and mathematician (1949–2021)

Minister of Finance
- In office 29 January 2002 – 15 October 2002
- Prime Minister: Mikuláš Dzurinda
- Preceded by: Brigita Schmögnerová
- Succeeded by: Ivan Mikloš

Personal details
- Born: 7 May 1949 Závod, Czechoslovakia (now Slovakia)
- Died: 26 March 2021 (aged 71) Bratislava, Slovakia
- Party: Party of the Democratic Left
- Education: Charles University; Comenius University

František Hajnovič (7 May 1949 – 26 March 2021) was born in the Závod village, Malacky district. He was a Slovak economist and mathematician, who briefly served as the Minister of Finance under the prime minister Mikuláš Dzurinda.

Hajnovič studies mathematical economics at the Charles University and econometrics at the Comenius University in Bratislava. Between 1972 and 1994 he worked as a researcher at the Institute of Statistics and Informatics. From 1994 until his retirement, with the exception of the period he served as the minister, he worked as a research economist and head of unit at the National Bank of Slovakia, focusing on macroeconomic imbalances and monetary policy questions.

Hajnovič was the founding member of the Party of Democratic Left.
