= Brigita Schmögnerová =

Slovak economist and politician

Minister of Finance of Slovakia
- In office 30 October 1998 – 29 January 2002
- Prime Minister: Mikuláš Dzurinda
- Preceded by: Miroslav Maxon
- Succeeded by: František Hajnovič

Personal details
- Born: 17 November 1947 (age 78) Bratislava, Czechoslovakia (now Slovakia)
- Party: Party of the Democratic Left
- Education: University of Economics in Bratislava
- Occupation: Politician

Brigita Schmögnerová (born 17 November 1947) is a Slovak economist and politician. She was the Minister of Finance of Slovakia from 1998 to 2002 under Prime Minister Mikuláš Dzurinda. She was appointed Executive Secretary of the United Nations Economic Commission for Europe in 2002.

Schmögnerová led the country's accession to the euro, which earned her the nickname of the "Iron lady of Slovakia".
