= Michal Horváth (economist) =

Slovak economist

Minister of Finance
- In office 15 May 2023 – 25 October 2023
- Prime Minister: Ľudovít Ódor
- Preceded by: Eduard Heger (acting)
- Succeeded by: Ladislav Kamenický

Personal details
- Born: 1979 (age 46–47) Dunajská Streda, Czechoslovakia
- Party: Independent
- Education: University of St Andrews; University of York; Comenius University
- Occupation: Economist

Michal Horváth (born 1979) is a Slovak economist and civil servant. From May to October 2023, he served as the Minister of Finance of Slovakia. Previously he served as the chief economist of the National Bank of Slovakia, Member of the Council for Budget Responsibility and Advisor to Finance and Labour Ministers. In addition, he was a lecturer at the University of York and a researcher at the Nuffield College, Oxford.

== Biography ==
Horváth was born in Dunajská Streda. He belongs to the Hungarian ethnic minority of Slovakia. Horváth studied Financial Management at the Comenius University and Economics at the University of York. He obtained his Ph.D. in Economics 2007 at University of St Andrews.

== Academic career ==
After obtaining his Ph.D., Horváth was a post-doctoral fellow at the Nuffield College and later a Lecturer at the University of York. Following his departure from the university, he was named an Honorary Fellow in the Department of Economics and Related Studies at the University of York.

=== Civil Service ===
Horváth was an advisor to the State Secretary at the Ministry of Labor (2003-2004) and the Minister of Finance (2007-2011). In 2012, he was among the founding members of the Council for Budget Responsibility, an independent watchdog public institution established in response to the sovereign debt crisis in Europe. In 2020, he became the Chief Economist at the National Bank of Slovakia. On 15 April 2023, the president Zuzana Čaputová assigned the Finance Ministry in the technocratic government of the prime minister Ľudovít Ódor to Horváth.
