= Hubová =

Village and municipality in Slovakia

- Municipality
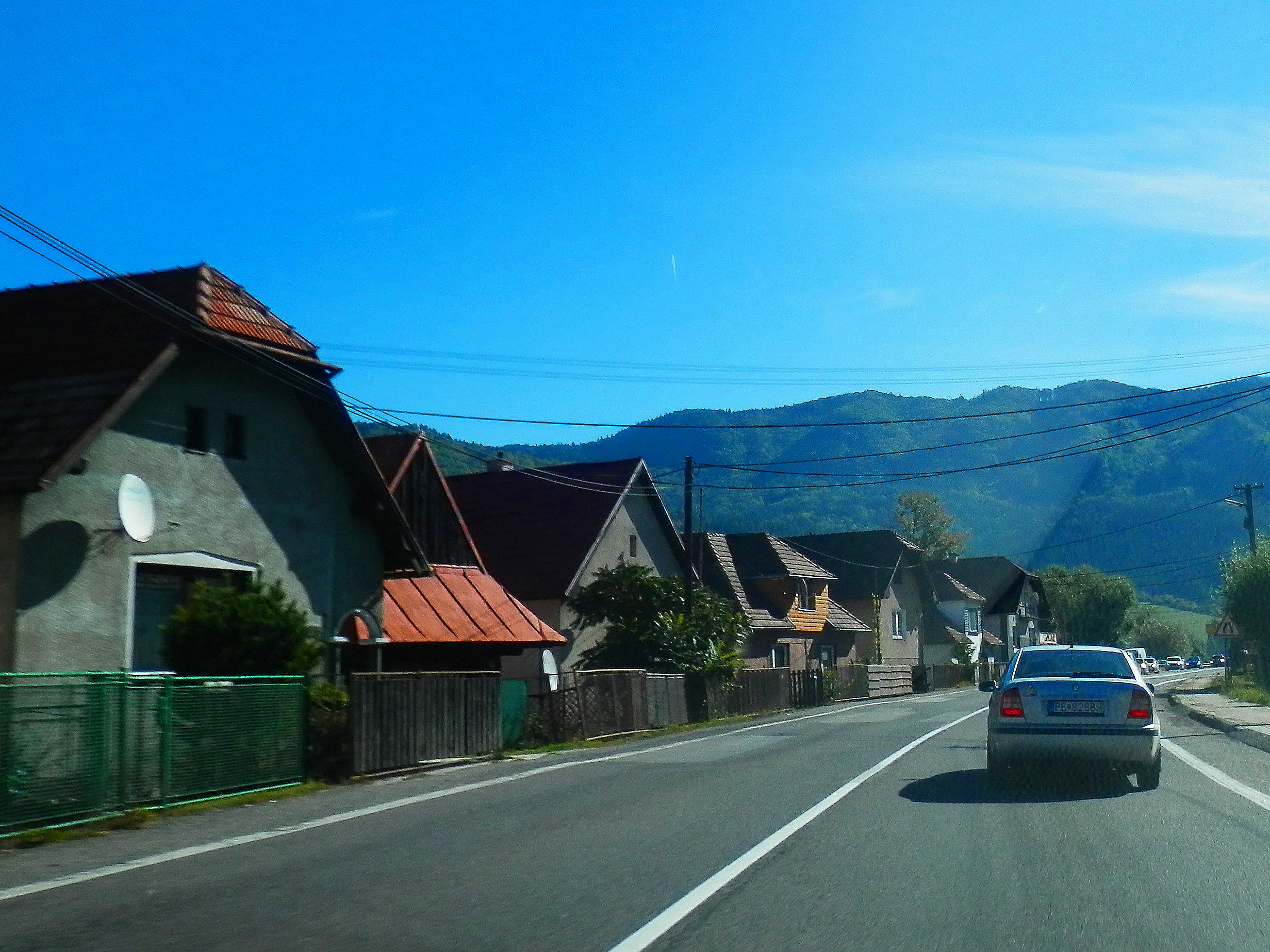

- Flag

- Location of Hubová in the Žilina Region Location of Hubová in Slovakia
- Coordinates: 49.12°N 19.18°E
- Country: Slovakia
- Region: Žilina Region
- District: Ružomberok District
- First mentioned: 1425

Area
  - Total: 16.69 km^{2} (6.44 sq mi)
- Elevation: 449 m (1,473 ft)

Population (2025)
  - Total: 1,089
- Time zone: UTC+1 (CET)
  - Summer (DST): UTC+2 (CEST)
- Postal code: 349 1
- Area code: +421 44
- Vehicle registration plate (until 2022): RK
- Website: www.obechubova.sk

Hubová (Hungarian: Gombás) is a village and municipality in Ružomberok District in the Žilina Region of northern Slovakia.

== History ==
In historical records the village was first mentioned in 1425.

== Geography ==
The municipality lies at an altitude of 449 metres (1,473 ft) and covers an area of 16.69 km^{2} (6.44 sq mi) (2025).

== Notable people ==
- Augustín Marián Húska (1929–2016) - politician

== Population ==
Population statistic (10 years)
Year	1995	2005	2015	2025
Count	1065	1078	1055	1089
Difference		+1.22%	−2.13%	+3.22%

Population statistic
Year	2024	2025
Count	1085	1089
Difference		+0.36%

It has a population of 1089 people (31 December 2025).

=== Ethnicity ===
Census 2021 (1+ %)
Ethnicity	Number	Fraction
Slovak	1059	98.14%
Not found out	13	1.2%
Total	1079	

In year 2021 was 1079 people by ethnicity 1059 as Slovak, 13 as Not found out, 4 as Hungarian, 3 as Czech, 3 as Russian, 2 as Polish, 2 as Other, 1 as Ukrainian, 1 as Turkish, 1 as German and 1 as English.

Note on population: The difference values of population numbers in the table "Population statistic" and in the sections "Ethnicity" & "Religion" is caused by the use of various statistical methods.

=== Religion ===
Census 2021 (1+ %)
Religion	Number	Fraction
Roman Catholic Church	912	84.52%
None	106	9.82%
Evangelical Church	14	1.3%
Not found out	12	1.11%
Other and not ascertained christian church	11	1.02%
Total	1079	

In year 2021 was 1079 people by religion 912 from Roman Catholic Church, 106 from None, 14 from Evangelical Church, 12 from Not found out, 11 from Other and not ascertained christian church, 7 from Christian Congregations in Slovakia, 5 from Greek Catholic Church, 4 from Other, 2 from Calvinist Church, 2 from Eastern Orthodox Church, 2 from Buddhism and 2 from Ad hoc movements.

== Genealogical resources ==
The records for genealogical research are available at the state archive "Statny Archiv in Bytca, Slovakia"

- Roman Catholic church records (births/marriages/deaths): 1710-1910 (parish A)
- Lutheran church records (births/marriages/deaths): 1873-1921 (parish B)

== See also ==
- List of municipalities and towns in Slovakia
