= Augustín Marián Húska =

Slovak politician (1929–2016)

Member of the National Council
- In office 23 June 1992 – 15 October 2002

Personal details
- Born: 9 November 1929 Hubová, Czechoslovakia
- Died: 1 November 2016 (aged 86)
- Party: Movement for a Democratic Slovakia
- Education: University of Economics in Bratislava

Augustín Marián Húska (9 September 1929 – 1 November 2016) was a Slovak politician. He served as the minister of privatization from 1990 to 1991 and as a deputy of the Federal Assembly (1990–1992) and of the National Council of Slovakia (1992–2002).

== Biography ==
=== Early life ===
Augustín Marián Húska was born on 9 September 1929 in the village of Hubová, nearby the town of Ružomberok. His father was an official of the fascist militia Hlinka Guard, who served as the mayor of Hubová during the World War II and took over a hotel in the village of Ľubochňa that had been confiscated from a Jewish family.

Húska studied at the University of Economics in Bratislava graduating in 1959. Following graduation, he was a researcher at the Institute for the Economics and Organization of the Construction Trade and, from 1990, at the University of Economics.

=== Political career ===
After the Velvet Revolution, Húska served as a deputy for the Public Against Violence movement, which he abandoned along with Vladimír Mečiar. For the rest of his political career, Húska was a leading politician of Mečiar's Movement for a Democratic Slovakia (HZDS), serving as the minister of privatization (1999–1991), a deputy of the Czechoslovak Federal Assembly (1990–1992) and, following the dissolution of Czechoslovakia, as a deputy the National Council of Slovakia (1992–2002). Following the 2002 Slovak parliamentary election, Húska retired from public life.

During the era of Mečiar's authoritative rule, Húska was amongst his inner circle of loyalists, being one of the few people who were allowed to go on a first name basis with Mečiar. Some analysts consider him to be the "ideologue" of HZDS at the time of its formation. Húska staunchly defended Mečiar's regime from Western European critique of its poor human rights record, by arguing that the "newly heathen" Europe was prejudiced against Slovakia due to its Christian heritage. He also argued for a delayed entry of Slovakia to the European Union, although the membership was not on the table for Slovakia during Mečiar's reign in any case.

Húska, alongside another Slovak economist Hvezdoň Kočtúch, advocated for a gradual economic transformation away from the state-led economy to free market. His vision was at odds with the "Big Bang" approach to transformation championed by most of the Czech politicians at the time, as well as the Slovak reformists such as Ivan Mikloš.

Húska was a part of the Slovak delegation negotiating the dissolution of Czechoslovakia with the Czech government representatives at the Villa Tugendhat. Nonetheless, he was excluded from the talks following a request from the Czech side. According to testimony of Mečiar, it was the Czech prime minister Václav Klaus who demanded the exclusion of Húska, whom he found annoying due to Húska's habit of speaking in long, complex sentences. Another explanation of the Czech demand to exclude Húska from the talks made by a member of the Czech delegation Tomáš Ježek, who attributed it to Húska's opposition to the free market economy.

== Death ==
Húska died on 1 November 2016 at the age of 86.
