= Štefan Vrablec =

Slovak Roman Catholic prelate (1925–2017)

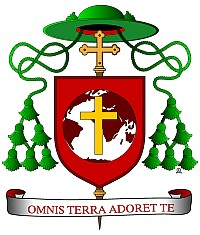
Coat of Arms of Bishop Vrablec

Štefan Vrablec (21 February 1925 in Závod, Czechoslovakia, present-day Slovakia – 1 September 2017 in Nitra, Slovakia) was a Slovak Roman Catholic prelate, who served as an Auxiliary Bishop of Bratislava-Trnava and Titular Bishop of Thasbalta since 1998 until 2004.

Vrablec was ordained as a Catholic priest on December 23, 1950, in Italy, because of the Communist Government of Czechoslovakia and the persecution of the Roman Catholic Church by the government. He served as priest in Italy, and was the Rector of the Pontifical College of St. Cyril and Methodius for the Slovaks in Rome. On June 19, 1998, he was appointed as titular bishop of Thasbalta and Auxiliary Bishop of Bratislava-Trnava, until his retirement on April 2, 2004.
