= Závod, Slovakia =

Závod Pozsonyzávod
- Municipality
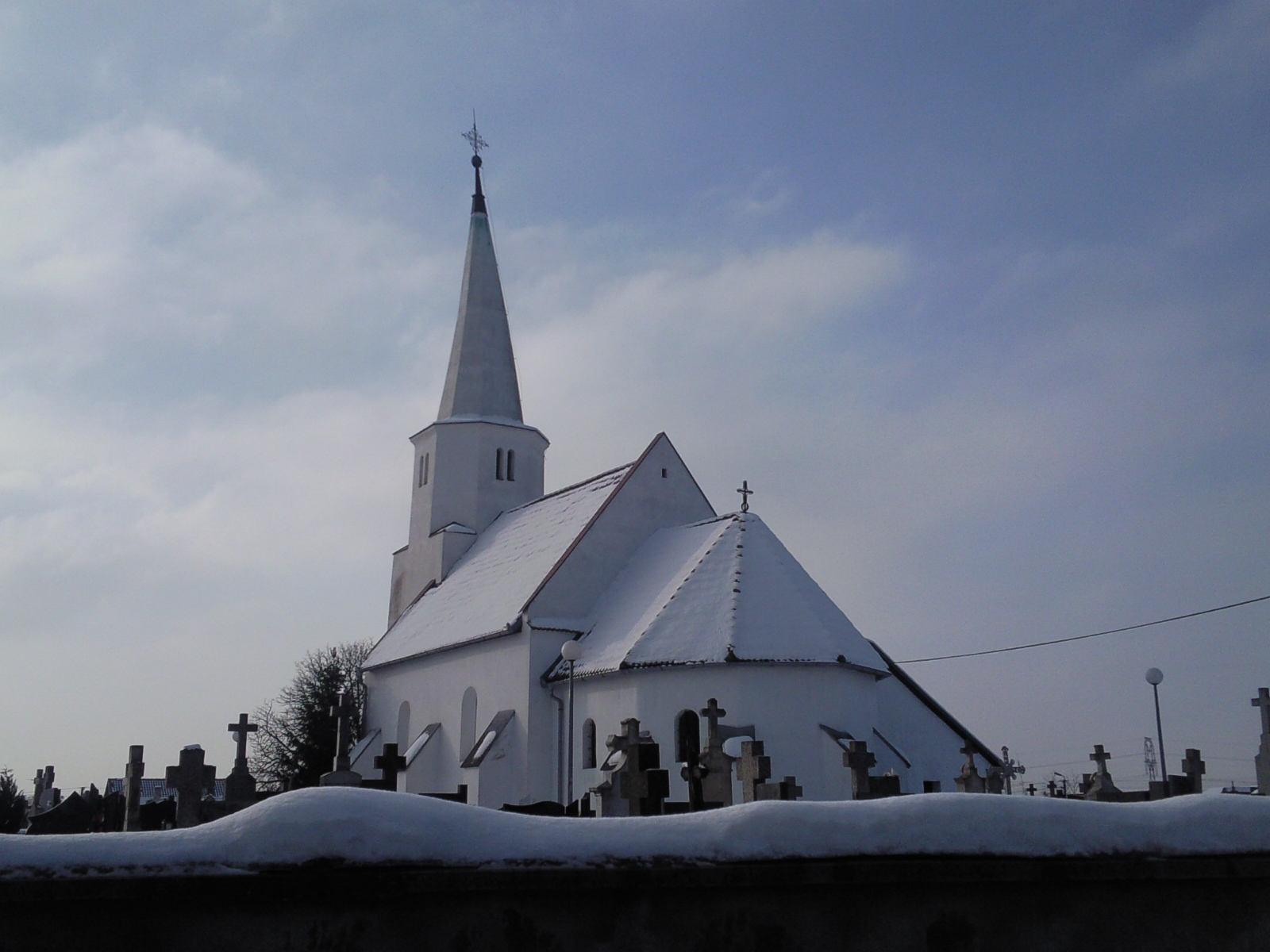
- Church of Visitation of Virgin Mary

- Flag

- Location of Závod in the Bratislava Region Location of Závod in Slovakia
- Coordinates: 48°33′N 17°02′E
- Country: Slovakia
- Region: Bratislava Region
- District: Malacky District
- First mentioned: 1557

Area
  - Total: 27.37 km^{2} (10.57 sq mi)
- Elevation: 161 m (528 ft)

Population (2025)
  - Total: 2,931
- Time zone: UTC+1 (CET)
  - Summer (DST): UTC+2 (CEST)
- Postal code: 908 72
- Area code: +421 34
- Vehicle registration plate (until 2022): MA
- Website: obeczavod.sk

Závod (Hungarian: Pozsonyzávod) is a village and municipality within the Malacky District in the Bratislava region of western Slovakia.

== Geography ==
The municipality lies at an altitude of 161 metres (528 ft) and covers an area of 27.37 km^{2} (10.57 sq mi) (2025).

== Population ==
Population statistic (10 years)
Year	1995	2005	2015	2025
Count	2528	2686	2804	2931
Difference		+6.25%	+4.39%	+4.52%

Population statistic
Year	2024	2025
Count	2938	2931
Difference		−0.23%

It has a population of 2931 people (31 December 2025).

=== Ethnicity ===
Census 2021 (1+ %)
Ethnicity	Number	Fraction
Slovak	2890	97.04%
Not found out	73	2.45%
Czech	33	1.1%
Total	2978	

In year 2021 was 2978 people by ethnicity 2890 as Slovak, 73 as Not found out, 33 as Czech, 22 as Romani, 8 as Hungarian, 5 as German, 4 as Vietnamese, 4 as Rusyn, 4 as Other, 3 as Russian, 3 as Austrian, 1 as Chinese, 1 as Ukrainian, 1 as Romanian, 1 as Polish and 1 as Bulgarian.

Note on population: The difference values of population numbers in the table "Population statistic" and in the sections "Ethnicity" & "Religion" is caused by the use of various statistical methods.

=== Religion ===
Census 2021 (1+ %)
Religion	Number	Fraction
Roman Catholic Church	2212	74.28%
None	572	19.21%
Not found out	86	2.89%
Evangelical Church	37	1.24%
Total	2978	

In year 2021 was 2978 people by religion 2212 from Roman Catholic Church, 572 from None, 86 from Not found out, 37 from Evangelical Church, 21 from Greek Catholic Church, 14 from Christian Congregations in Slovakia, 10 from Ad hoc movements, 7 from Eastern Orthodox Church, 6 from Other and not ascertained christian church, 5 from Calvinist Church, 2 from Other, 2 from Buddhism, 1 from Jehovah's Witnesses, 1 from Islam, 1 from Hinduism and 1 from Baptists Church.

== Famous people ==
- Štefan Vrablec (1925-2017), Slovak Roman Catholic bishop
- František Hajnovič (1949-2021), Minister of Finance (2002)
