= Institute for Public Affairs (Slovakia) =

Slovakian think tank

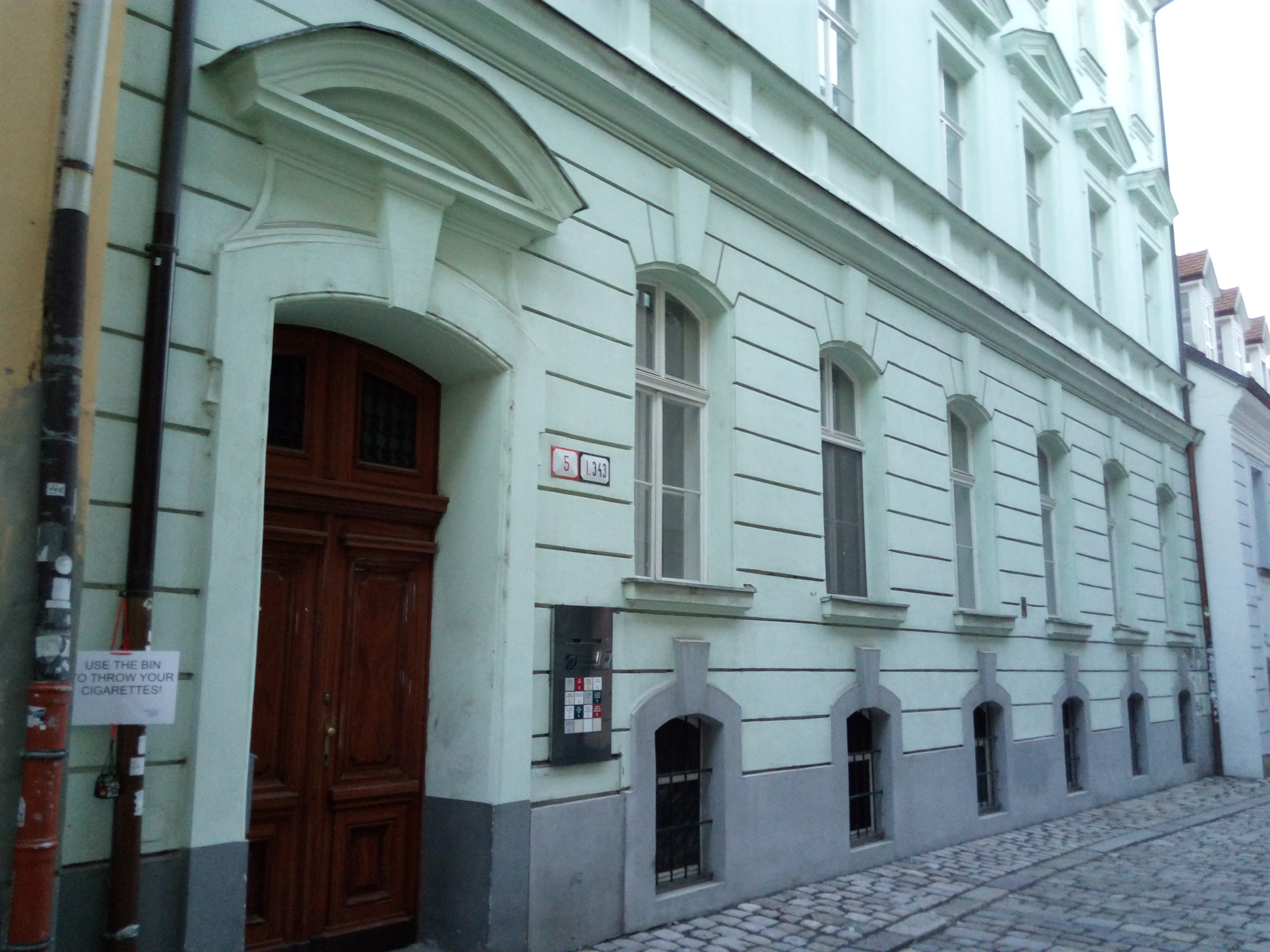

The Institute for Public Affairs (Slovak: Inštitút pre verejné otázky, IVO) is a non-governmental think tank, registered to operate in the Slovak Republic. It was founded by Grigorij Mesežnikov and Martin Bútora, with the aim of promoting the values of an open society and a democratic political culture in public policy and decision-making. IVO brings together experts from many different areas of study. Mesežnikov has been President of the institute since 1998.
