= Erik Kaliňák =

Slovak politician

Erik Kaliňák MEP
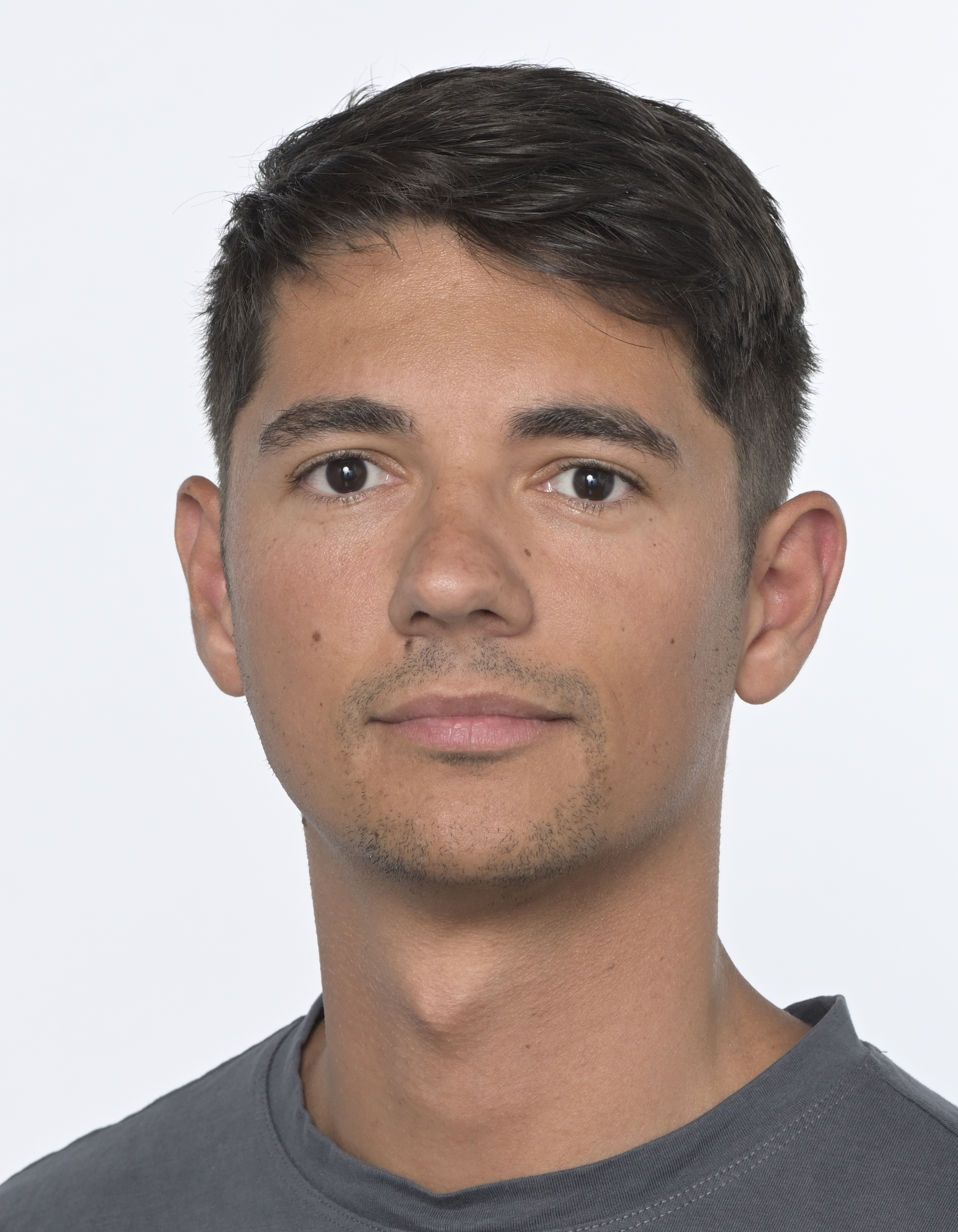
- Erik Kaliňák in 2024

Member of the European Parliament for Slovakia
- Incumbent
- Assumed office 16 July 2024

Member of the National Council
- In office 25 October 2023 – 15 July 2024

Personal details
- Born: 9 September 1991 (age 35) Bratislava, Czechoslovakia
- Party: Direction – Social Democracy (since 2019)
- Spouse: Silvia Kaliňáková (2020–present)
- Relations: Robert Kaliňák (Uncle); Kristián Kaliňák (Brother)
- Parent: Milan Kaliňák
- Education: Comenius University

Erik Kaliňák (born 9 September 1991) is a Slovak politician of Direction – Social Democracy (Smer–SD). He was elected member of the European Parliament in 2024. Kaliňák has been deputy leader of Smer–SD since 2020, as well as member of the National Council since 2023.

== Early life and career ==
He is the nephew of deputy prime minister Robert Kaliňák. He was born in Bratislava. Kaliňák studied philosophy at the Comenius University graduating in 2015.

Kaliňák has called himself "a de-facto Rusyn with Bulgarian roots". He began working for Smer–SD in 2018, as the Facebook account manager of Robert Fico and Ľuboš Blaha. In the 2020 parliamentary election, he became a substitute member.

In August 2025, Kaliňák and Richard Glück met the manosphere influencers Tate brothers. The Jewish community of Slovakia denounced the meeting pointing the brothers are well known for their misogyny.
