= Grigorij Mesežnikov =

Slovak political scientist (born 1958)

Grigorij Mesežnikov (born 25 March 1958, Oryol, USSR) is a political analyst of Jewish descent who lives in Bratislava, Slovakia.

Born in the Soviet Union, in 1979 Mesežnikov moved to Slovakia with his wife. At first, he worked in the Slovak Academy of Sciences in Bratislava. With Martin Bútora (presidential candidate in the 2004 election), he founded the Slovak Institute for Public Affairs (IVO). He has been president of the institute since 1998. IVO's aim is spreading principles of democracy in Slovakia.

Mesežnikov is a frequent contributor to many politics-related newspapers in Slovakia.
