= Monika Jankovská =

Slovak politician

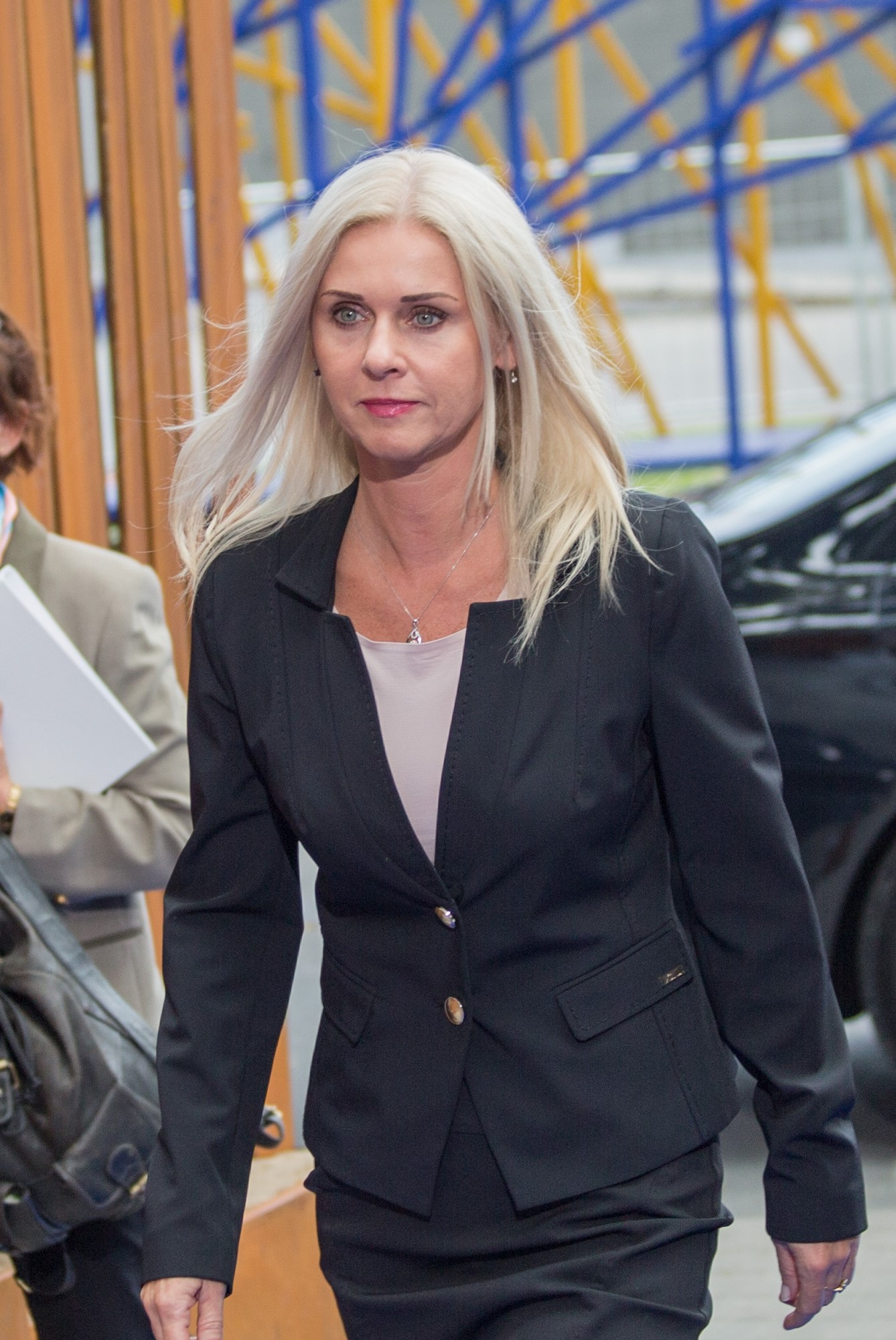
- Monika Jankovská in 2017

State Secretary of Justice
- In office 2012 – 4 September 2019

Personal details
- Born: 12 January 1971 (age 55) Bratislava, Czechoslovakia
- Party: Direction – Slovak Social Democracy

Monika Jankovská (born 12 January 1971) is a Slovak politician and judge. She served as State Secretary of Justice from 2012 to 2019. A member of Direction – Slovak Social Democracy, she served in the National Council from 2016 to 2020.

== Life ==
In 2012, Monika Jankovská is nominated as State Secretary of Justice. She served under Tomáš Borec, Justice minister, where her influence grew. Despite staying in the ministry of Lucie Žitňanská in the third government of Robert Fico, her influence decreased.

On 4 September 2019, she steps down from her role as State Secretary of Justice. A month after her resignation it emerged she had been in contact with Marian Kočner involved in the murder of Ján Kuciak. Following this, she was the subject of a disciplinary motion by Gábor Gál, the Justice minister with whom she worked.

She then works a judge at the Bratislava Regional Court. On 28 February 2020, she is suspended as a judge. In March 2020, she is sent to prison on charges corruption-related crimes, attempts to interfere with the independence of the courts, and obstruction of justice. She is released from prison in March 2021.
