= Ivan Mikloš =

Slovak politician

Minister of Finance
- In office 9 July 2010 – 4 April 2012
- Prime Minister: Iveta Radičová
- Preceded by: Ján Počiatek
- Succeeded by: Peter Kažimír
- In office 15 October 2002 – 4 July 2006
- Prime Minister: Mikuláš Dzurinda
- Preceded by: František Hajnovič
- Succeeded by: Ján Počiatek

Personal details
- Born: 2 June 1960 (age 66) Svidník, Czechoslovakia (now Slovakia)
- Party: Public against Violence (Before 1993); Democratic Party (1993–2000); Slovak Democratic and Christian Union (2000–present)
- Education: University of Economics, Bratislava; London School of Economics

Ivan Mikloš (born 2 June 1960) is a Slovak politician who served as Minister of Finance of Slovakia from 2002 to 2006, and Deputy Prime Minister for Economy between 1998 and 2002.

== Biography ==
Mikloš became the only opposition member of the Supervisory Board of the National Pension Fund in 1997–1998, Deputy Prime Minister for Economy from 1998 until 2002, and Minister of Finance from 2002 until 2006. In April 2010, he was expert guarantor of the online project University for Modern Slovakia, which aimed to convey basic economic knowledge to the general public in an accessible form.

In 2015, Mikloš worked as consultant of Ukrainian finance and economy ministers The following year, in 2016, he served as Chief of Advisors to Prime Minister of Ukraine Volodymyr Groysman.

Mikloš is the recipient of numerous domestic and international awards and was once considered one of the best Slovak economists. He is an ethnic Ruthenian.

== Honours ==
- 2004: Finance Minister of the Year by Euromoney.
- 2005: TAE Award from the European Taxpayers Association for Slovak tax reforms.

== See also ==
- Tatra Tiger

Political offices
Preceded by František Hajnovič	Minister of Finance; 2002–2006	Succeeded by Ján Počiatek
Preceded by Ján Počiatek	Minister of Finance; 2010–2012	Succeeded by Peter Kažimír
