= Martin Bútora =

Slovak sociologist, writer, and diplomat (born 1944)

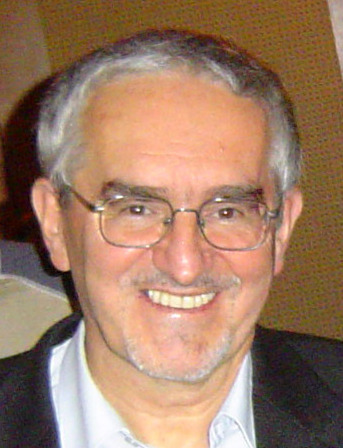

Slovak Ambassador to the United States
- In office 1999–2003

Personal details
- Born: 7 October 1944 (age 81)
- Scientific career
- Fields: Sociology
- Institutions: University of Trnava; Charles University

Martin Bútora (born 7 October 1944) is a Slovak sociologist, writer, university professor and diplomat.

== Political career ==
In November 1989 he was a founding member of the political movement Public Against Violence, the leading movement of the democratic revolution in Slovakia. He was the human rights advisor to the former president of Czechoslovakia Václav Havel from 1990 to 1992.

In 1997 he co-founded the Institute for Public Affairs (IVO) where he served as its first president.

He was the Slovak Ambassador to the United States from 1999 to 2003.

Bútora placed 6th in the 2004 presidential election, receiving 6.5% of the vote.

Bútora is a member of the advisory board of the Prague European Summit.

== Scholarship ==
In the first half of the 1990s he taught at the Charles University of Prague and at the Trnava University.

His sociological work focuses on international politics, transatlantic relations, human rights, and minorities.

=== Key publications ===
- Abschied von der Tschechoslowakei: Ursachen und Folgen der tschechisch-slowakischen Trennung (Farewell to Czechoslovakia: Causes and Consequences of the Czech-Slovak Separation). Köln : Verlag Wissenschaft und Politik, 1993. ISBN 9783804688032 (with Rüdiger Kipke and Karel Vodička)
- "Slovakia's Democratic Awakening," Journal of Democracy 10 (1, 1999): 80–95 (with Zora Bútorova)
- We Saw the Holocaust. Bratislava: Milan Šimečka Foundation, 2005. ISBN 8089008194 (eds., with Nadácia Milana Šimečku, et al.)
- Active Citizenship and the Nongovernmental Sector in Slovakia: Trends and Perspectives. Bratislava: Včelí Dom, 2012. ISBN 9788097088514 (with Zora Bútorova and Boris Strečanský)

== Honors and awards ==
- 1999 – Democracy Service Medal, National Endowment for Democracy, Washington, D.C.
- 2000 – Ján Papánek Medal
- 2000 – Order of Ľudovít Štúr, for his contribution to defense of human rights and development of civil society, awarded by Rudolf Schuster, President of Slovakia.
- 2002 – Celebration of Freedom Award, American Jewish Committee
- 2012 – Czech and Slovak Freedom Lecture, Woodrow Wilson Center, Washington, DC
- 2019 - VIZE 97 Prize
