= Direction – Social Democracy =

Slovak political party

Direction – Social Democracy Smer – sociálna demokracia
- Leader: Robert Fico
- Deputy Leaders: See list: Ľuboš Blaha; Juraj Blanár; Erik Kaliňák; Ladislav Kamenický; Richard Takáč
- General Secretary: Marián Saloň
- MEP Leader: Monika Beňová
- Founder: Robert Fico
- Founded: 8 November 1999
- Split from: Party of the Democratic Left
- Headquarters: Súmračná 3263/25, 82102 Bratislava
- Youth wing: Young Social Democrats
- Membership (2024): ▲13,540
- Ideology: Social democracy; Left-wing populism; Left-wing nationalism; Left conservatism; Social conservatism
- Political position: Centre-left to left-wing
- European affiliation: Party of European Socialists (2009–2025)
- European Parliament group: S&D (2004–2023); Non-Inscrits (since 2023)
- International affiliation: Socialist International
- Colours: Red; Navy blue
- Slogan: Stability, order and social security (2023)
- National Council: 42 / 150
- European Parliament: 5 / 15
- Regional governors: 1 / 8
- Regional deputies (Note: Also with coalitions.): 50 / 419
- Mayors: 516 / 2,904
- Local councillors: 2,364 / 20,462

Website
- strana-smer.sk
- Politics of Slovakia; Political parties; Elections; A: The party is also described as conservative left and left-authoritarian. This is due to its more conservative positions on social issues.

Direction – Social Democracy (Slovak: Smer – sociálna demokracia), also commonly referred to as Smer, is a left-wing populist and left-wing nationalist political party in Slovakia led by its founder and incumbent prime minister, Robert Fico. The party identifies as social-democratic, and was described as a combination of "leftist economics and nationalist appeal".

Founded by Fico in 1999 as a split from the post-communist Party of the Democratic Left, Smer initially defined itself as the Third Way party. It incorporated ‘Social Democracy’ into its name after merging with several minor centre-left parties in 2005. It has dominated Slovak politics since 2006, leading three coalition governments (2006–2010, 2016–2020, 2023–present) and one single-party government (2012–2016). During its time in power, it continued the European integration of Slovakia, reversed some economically liberal reforms implemented by previous centre-right governments and introduced various social welfare measures. Smer-led governments have been associated with numerous political corruption scandals.

After the 2020 parliamentary election, which marked Smer's return to the opposition, Slovak authorities investigated a number of corruption-related crimes involving multiple party politicians and individuals reportedly linked to the party. Smer strongly rejected all charges, calling it the criminalization of politics. At the party congress in July 2020, following a major internal split that resulted in the founding of a new party named Voice – Social Democracy (Hlas), Fico announced a shift to "the rural social democracy that perceives the specifics of Slovak reality". Post–2020 Smer holds stances that have been described as nationalist, populist, Eurosceptic and Russophilic.

In 2023, Smer won the parliamentary election with 23% of the vote and 42 seats in the National Council and subsequently formed the Fourth cabinet of Robert Fico.

== History ==
=== Foundation and early years (1999–2006) ===
Originally named Direction (Slovak: Smer), the party was founded on 8 November 1999, emerging as a breakaway from the post-Communist Party of the Democratic Left (SDĽ), the successor of the original Communist Party of Slovakia and the governing party from 1998 to 2002. Under Robert Fico, at the time one of the most popular politicians in the country, it quickly became one of the most popular parties in Slovakia, while the SDĽ experienced a constant decrease within popularity. In the 2002 Slovak parliamentary election, its first formal election period, it became the third-largest party in the National Council of the Slovak Republic, with 25 of 150 seats. In 2003, it changed its formal name to Direction (Third Way) (Slovak: Smer (tretia cesta)) and Party of Civic Understanding merged into the party.

In 2005, the party absorbed the SDĽ and the Social Democratic Alternative, a small social democratic party that split from the original SDĽ somewhat later than Direction did, in addition to the Social Democratic Party of Slovakia. Founded in 1990, the party became known for the leadership of Alexander Dubček, and Direction adopted the name Social Democracy. Following the party's victory in 2006, Smer entered into a coalition with the nationalist Slovak National Party (SNS) and was readmitted into the Party of European Socialists (PES) in 2008. It later formed another coalition with the SNS in 2016.

=== Government (2006–2010) ===
In the 2006 Slovak parliamentary election, the party won 29.1% of the popular vote and 50 of 150 seats. Following that election, Smer formed a coalition government with the People's Party – Movement for a Democratic Slovakia (HZDS) and the Slovak National Party (SNS), an extremist nationalist party. The coalition was described as "anti-market left" and "Slovak national", given its socioeconomically left-wing but also nationalist policies; it was also described as "left-nationalist and illiberal".

On 12 October 2006, the party was temporarily suspended from membership in the PES. The resolution to suspend the party referred specifically to the PES Declaration "For a modern, pluralist and tolerant Europe", adopted in Berlin by the PES congress in 2001, which states that "all PES parties adhere to the following principles ... [and] to refrain from any form of political alliance or co-operation at all levels with any political party which incites or attempts to stir up racial or ethnic prejudices and racial hatred." In The Slovak Spectator, the PES chairman Poul Nyrup Rasmussen commented: "Most of our members stood solidly behind our values, according to which forming a coalition with the extreme right is unacceptable." The party was readmitted on 14 February 2008 after its chairman Fico and SNS leader Jan Slota pledged in a letter to respect European values, human rights, and all ethnic minorities.

=== Opposition (2010–2012) ===
Party logo, 2005–2019

Although the party won the most votes in the 2010 Slovak parliamentary election, with a lead of 20% over the second-place Slovak Democratic and Christian Union – Democratic Party (SDKÚ), they had not been able to form a government because of losses sustained by their coalition partners. Their result, 34.8%, gave them 62 of 150 seats in the National Council, but the HZDS failed to cross the 5% threshold, losing all their seats, and the SNS was reduced to nine seats. The four opposition centre-right parties (the Christian Democratic Movement, Freedom and Solidarity, Bridge, and SDKÚ) were able to form a new government.

=== Government (2012–2020) ===
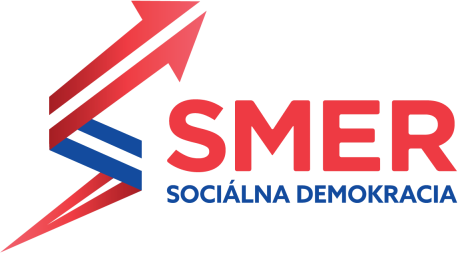
Party logo, 2019–2021

In the 2012 Slovak parliamentary election, Smer won 44.4% of the vote and became the largest party in the National Council, with an absolute majority of 83 seats (out of 150). Fico's Second Cabinet was the first single-party government in Slovakia since 1993. In the 2014 European Parliament election in Slovakia, Smer came in first place nationally, receiving 24.09% of the vote and electing four Members of the European Parliament.

In 2014, in cooperation with the Christian Democratic Movement (KDH), the party passed a constitutional amendment defining marriage exclusively as a union between a man and a woman. The amendment also states that marriage, parenthood, and family are under the protection of the law, and that children and young people are guaranteed special protection.

Despite suffering a significant loss in support as a result of strikes by teachers and nurses earlier in the year, Smer won the 2016 parliamentary election with 28.3% of the vote and 49 of 150 seats, and subsequently formed Fico's Third Cabinet in a coalition government with Bridge, Network, and the Slovak National Party. Prime Minister Fico resigned in the wake of the political crisis following the murder of Ján Kuciak and was replaced by Peter Pellegrini, with the same majority. However, Fico remained as the leader of Smer.

=== Opposition (2020–2023) ===
The party managed to score 18.29% in the 2020 Slovak parliamentary election, which was 2 to 3 percent more than the latest polls showed, but it was still a decrease of 10% compared to previous elections. The party occupied 38 seats in parliament. Pellegrini, the chairman of the Fico parliamentary group, became the vice-chairman of the National Council for the Opposition on the basis of post-election negotiations. In May 2020, two deputies for Smer (Ján Podmanický and Marián Kéry) founded a value policy platform with deputies from KDŽP, elected as a candidate of the Kotlebists – People's Party Our Slovakia. Because of this, Pellegrini sharply criticized them, while Fico defended Podmanický. In May 2020, Podmanický also left the Smer parliamentary group after criticism from his own ranks, although he then rejoined the party in 2022.

As early as April 2020, party vice-chairman Pellegrini announced his ambition to run for party chairman as Smer's most popular politician, winning 170,000 more votes than the chairman. Fico reacted strongly, saying that he did not intend to resign and wanted to remain at the head of the party, while Pellegrini gradually began to tighten his criticism of Fico and the party's situation. Pellegrini criticized the fact that the party's presidency had not met since the election and the date of the parliament was unknown. Pellegrini demanded that the assembly be held as soon as possible, while Fico insisted that the nomination assembly take place only at a ceremonial assembly in December 2020.

At a June 2020 press conference in Banská Bystrica, Pellegrini announced that he would resign as vice-chairman of Smer and leave the party in the near future. He also outlined the establishment of a new party, Voice – Social Democracy (Hlas–SD), which he said should be social democratic, but refuse to be liberal. Around that time, Fico had already offered Pellegrini the position of party chairman, provided that he maintained his influence in the party, an offer which was rejected by Pellegrini. In the first FOCUS survey, 21.4% of respondents said they would vote for the new Pellegrini party, while those saying they would vote for the original Smer remained at 9.6%. At a press conference one week following the announcement of Pellegrini's departure, another 10 deputies announced they would leave the party, including Vice-presidents Peter Žiga and Richard Raši, Bureau member Denisa Saková and long-standing deputies and party members. At the same time, together with Pellegrini, they announced the creation of a new social-democratic party at the press conference, which they would join. Political scientist Grigory Mesezhnikov postulated that after the departure of the Pellegrini group, the Smer could move further to the left into the spectrum of the radical to communist left. Political scientist August Giller argued that "with Pellegrini gone, Smer under Fico intensified its nationalistic and socially conservative stances".

=== Government (2023–present) ===
As Smer won the parliamentary election held in 2023 with 23% of the vote and 42 seats in the National Council, Robert Fico, the party's leader was given a mandate to form a government. The Fourth cabinet of Robert Fico comprising Smer, Voice – Social Democracy (Hlas–SD) and the Slovak National Party (SNS) sworn in on 25 October 2023.

==== Social policy ====
In 2025, in cooperation with KDH, the party passed a constitutional amendment introducing further provisions related to cultural, ethical, and family issues. The amendment legally recognizes only two sexes, defined by biological criteria, and states that a mother is a woman and a father is a man. It bans surrogacy and guarantees a child's right to know their parents. Adoption is restricted to married heterosexual couples. The amendment also strengthens parental rights, particularly in the area of education, and requires school curricula to align with the cultural and ethical values set out in the Slovak Constitution. It affirms Slovakia's sovereignty in matters such as the protection of life, human dignity, marriage, parenthood, family, culture, language, and related areas of healthcare, education, and upbringing. It further states that Slovak law in these domains takes precedence over European Union law.

In 2025, the party's government passed a law amendment requiring NGOs to submit an annual "transparency report" starting in 2026. The report must include details of donors who contribute more than 5,000 euros, including their full names. NGOs will also be required to disclose information about their governing bodies or members of those bodies. Furthermore, NGOs will be classified as obligated entities under the Freedom of Information Act and must provide information upon request if they receive more than 3,300 euros from public sources in a single instance or a total of more than 10,000 euros. Initially, the party sought to pass a law labeling certain NGOs as foreign agents, organizations with foreign support or lobbyists. However, it withdrew the proposal due to the risk of conflict with European law and opposition from the junior coalition partner, Hlas. Slovakia's Public Defender of Rights, Róbert Dobrovodský, challenged the law amendment at the Constitutional Court, arguing it violates constitutional and human rights by threatening donor anonymity, restricting foreign funding, increasing administrative burdens, and disproportionately affecting smaller NGOs.

==== Foreign policy ====
Fico has promised to cut all aid to Ukraine as a result of the Russian Invasion of Ukraine, and has promised to block Ukrainian accession to NATO should the subject be broached under his tenure. Fico has also stated that the Ukrainian government is run by neo-Nazis.

==== Legal reforms ====
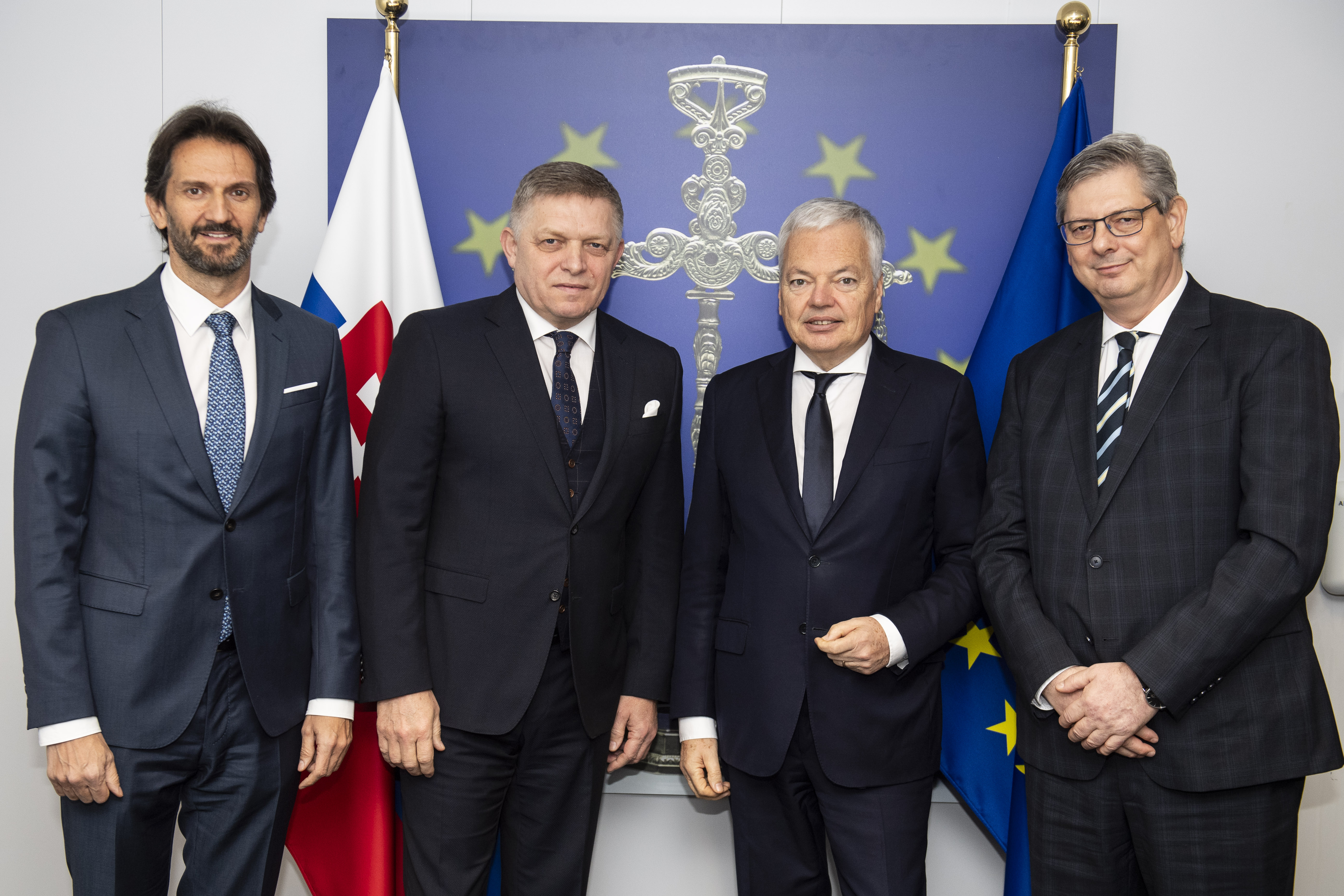
Meeting of the Slovak delegation with the European Commissioner for Justice Didier Reynders, 27 November 2023

In December 2023, the Fourth Cabinet of Robert Fico introduced an amendment to the Criminal Code. The government proposed that the bill be debated in a fast-track legislative procedure, arguing that the status quo leads to human rights violations. The amendment included scrapping the Special Prosecutor's Office dealing with high-level corruption and lowering penalties for financial crimes. The fast-track legislative procedure faced widespread criticism from the parliamentary opposition, President Zuzana Čaputová, the European Commission and non-governmental organizations, resulting in a weeks-long opposition parliamentary obstruction and a series of demonstrations.

Critics have raised questions about potential conflicts of interest within the government coalition. They have noted that various individuals with perceived affiliations to the government, alongside accused members of the coalition parties, including the bill's rapporteur, MP Tibor Gašpar of Smer, could be directly affected by the proposed lowering of penalties. Additionally, their cases are overseen by the Special Prosecutor's Office, which the amendment would abolish. The coalition government introduced the amendment, citing the need to shift towards a rehabilitative approach to justice, update the criminal code, and align with European Union standards. Proponent of the law, the Ministry of Justice led by Boris Susko of Smer published the brochure 'Overview of Violations of the Principles of the Rule of Law in the Years 2020–2023.'

The amendment was finally approved by the National Council on 8 February 2024. The final proposal also included a reduction of the statute of limitations in rape cases from 20 to 10 years, which again caused widespread criticism from the parliamentary opposition, President Zuzana Čaputová and non-governmental organizations. The government defended the reduction of the limitation period by motivating victims to report rape earlier, possibly allowing a return to the 20-year limitation period in the next amendment after the approval of the law.

President Zuzana Čaputová signed the law on 16 February, verbally clearly expressing her opposition to its content. The President argued that by signing the law instead of vetoing it, she wants to create enough time for the Constitutional Court to decide on her submission challenging the constitutionality of the law. As of February 2024, the Constitutional Court is expected to make its decision following the publication of the law in the collection of laws by the Ministry of Justice.

On 17 October 2025, Smer was expelled from the Party of European Socialists in a unanimous vote for violations of the group's values by party leader Robert Fico.

== Ideology and policies ==
Smer's ideological development compared to other social-democratic parties such as the German SPD, Austrian SPÖ, Bulgarian BSP, Czech ČSSD, Hungarian MSZP, Polish SLD/NL, and Romanian PSD on the TAN/GAL (sociocultural) and left-right (economic) dimensions. By 2025, SMER has become the second most socially conservative party, and the most economically left-wing one amongst the compared parties.

Direction – Social Democracy has been recognised as a social-democratic party, and is considered a centre-left and a left-wing party. Additionally, it has also been variously described as anti-establishment, nationalist, left-authoritarian, left-conservative, populist, centrist populist, social populist, left-wing populist, and national populist. The party has been recognised as diverging from the typical Western European social-democratic tradition due to its rejection of postmaterial values.

In their 2008 publication, Slovak political scientists Grigorij Mesežnikov and Oľga Gyárfášová argue that Smer is a social-democratic party (thus matching its self-identification), but one with very strong nationalist and populist elements that also include aspects of social conservatism. Tim Haughton states that the party "conveys both a Slovak version of social democracy and a stronger national emphasis"; he also stressed that the party cannot be seen as right-wing or far-right, but rather as one that combines "leftist economics and nationalist appeal". In 2025, Roman Hlatky and Oľga Gyárfášová wrote that Smer combines "left-wing economic orientation with conservative, if not radical, stances on sociocultural issues". They also argue that Smer "takes the strongest left-wing positions" amongst European social-democratic parties, but that it also "has shifted dramatically in a conservative direction on the sociocultural dimension", although the Bulgarian Socialist Party and Romanian Social Democratic Party had undergone similar conservative shift.

While scholars avoid labeling it as a far-right party, they have described it as incorporating far-right themes, expressing views that resonate with far-right voters, or advancing an electoral program aligned with far-right agendas. Natalia Hatarova described the party's ideological drift:

During the ‘90s and into the next century, Smer became increasingly Euro-optimistic, economically open, and culturally mainstream. After the killings of the Slovak investigative journalist Jan Kuciak and his fiancée in 2018, Fico’s resignation and his temporary exile from mainstream politics, Smer, along with other parties, became more culturally conservative, nationalistic, and Eurosceptic.

Hatarova also argues that Smer has become increasingly friendly towards some European far-right parties and figures, such as Viktor Orbán of the Hungarian Fidesz party. However, she concludes that Smer's shift "appears to be caused by pure opportunism rather than continuous influence by Orbán [or other far-right figures]".

Political scientist Seán Hanley described Smer as a "conservative social democracy" which breaks with the cultural liberalism and international of Western social democrats, seeing it as a cause of crisis and political exhaustion. Instead, Smer heavily stresses Slovak nationalism and bases its idea of "Slovak social democracy" on defending the nation and Slovak historical struggle for national liberation. It promotes nationalism as a left-wing reaction to the free market reforms backed by Czech politicians, seeing as the cause for Velvet divorce. In a draft of its ideological principles, the party drew parallels between 1960s Czechoslovak reform communism and the needed reform of European social democracy (calling it the "social democracy with a human face"). The draft also stated that Smer:

have in our historical DNA, the message of Emanuel Lehocký who fought against national oppression in the [pre-1918] Kingdom of Hungary and made a major contribution to our national emancipation. We are a social democratic party and a Slovak party. We feel no contradiction between social democracy and patriotism, between the left and the nation. We are social and national; we protect working people and we also protect Slovakia.

=== Economic policy ===
Smer advocates economically left-wing policies. The main economic proposals of the party focus on the establishment of a welfare state and supporting the poorest groups of Slovakia. Many of the party's socioeconomic policies, such as free travel for pensioners and pension increases are considered typically left-wing populist. The party also promotes redistributive policies, such as corporate tax increases and income tax hikes for the highest earners.

Smer also adheres to economic nationalism; Grigorij Mesežnikov noted that "Smer openly subscribes to etatism as the foundation of its political profile and advocates government's strong role in a number of areas" and called its economic policy "etatist paternalism", while also arguing that the party also represents "socio-economic policies based on social-democratic values". Robert Fico, the leader of the party, argued that the government should be "the father of all citizens" and stated that a strong state is necessary to improve the socioeconomic conditions of Slovak citizens.

The party presents its economic policies as being "social" and "pro-ordinary people", and its proposals also included the introduction of differential VAT rates, replacement of flat income tax rate with a progressive one that would tax the lower-income groups much less and reduction of excise duty on fuel oils. In regards to the Slovak healthcare system, the party advocated a ban on processing fees as well as a halt to the privatization of public health system. Smer also made pledges to cancel payment of tuition fees for regular university students and establishing a dynamic minimum wage that would be fixed to the 60% of average salary. The party is highly critical of other Slovak parties, accusing them of implementing "anti-social" policies that neglect the poor while benefitting the rich. Robert Fico argued that the neoliberal economic policy of the Mikuláš Dzurinda threw Slovakia "back to the 1930s".

In its economic rhetoric, Smer also frequently attacks monopolies, arguing that the increase in gas prices is caused by the "ruthless pricing policy of monopolies" that are "raking in exorbitant profits". The party is also critical of the banking industry, stating that Slovak banks tend to collect unfairly high service fees from their client; the party promoted itself as one willing to ban or limit the service fees of Slovak banks. In regards to Slovak banks, Robert Fico said: "The banks operating in Slovakia must realize that they operate on the territory of a sovereign state, which must use all available means to bring a pressure to bear on the banking sector." In response to criticism of his remarks, Fico also argued that the political opponents of Smer are "conveying the fears of international corporations and financial groups that literally govern this country and now they have understood that once our program is implemented, the gold rush in Slovakia will be over." This reveals a highly nationalist orientation of the party.

==== Fiscal consolidation since 2023 ====
Since regaining power in 2023, Smer–SD has focused on fiscal consolidation to reduce Slovakia's high deficit and stabilize public debt. The government introduced a €2.7 billion package combining tax increases—including higher health insurance contributions and minimum corporate taxes—and expenditure controls such as public administration reforms and cuts to operating costs. Social programs like the 13th pension remain protected.

International institutions, notably the IMF, acknowledge these steps but consider them insufficient to fully address the structural deficit, estimating that fiscal adjustments of about 3.7% of GDP over 2024–28 are necessary. The IMF and Slovakia's Council for Budget Responsibility highlight an overreliance on revenue measures and call for deeper expenditure reforms. The Supreme Audit Office warns that growing pension obligations pose long-term fiscal risks. The National Bank of Slovakia projects that the consolidation will slow short-term economic growth by around 0.6 percentage points, and experts caution that tax-heavy consolidation may dampen private investment and growth prospects.

=== Foreign policy ===
Smer holds Russophilic and Eurosceptic stances on foreign policy; however, it claims to support Slovakia's membership in the European Union and NATO. The party expresses strong anti-Western, especially anti-American sentiment, often spreading Russian propaganda narratives.

Regarding the Russo-Ukrainian War, Smer advocates for ending military aid to Ukraine and lifting sanctions against Russia. The party has described the conflict as a proxy war between the United States and Russia, characterizing Russia's actions as a response to perceived threats to its national interests. In its statements, Smer has claimed that the war was provoked in 2014 by what it describes as the "extermination of citizens of Russian nationality by Ukrainian fascists." However, since his return to power, Fico has taken a somewhat different line on Ukraine than during his election campaign. During a meeting with Ukrainian Prime Minister Denys Shmyhal in January 2024, Fico promised not to block private Slovak arms companies from selling to Ukraine, not to block EU financial support for Ukraine, and to support the accession of Ukraine to the European Union. He described Slovakia's political differences with Ukraine as "minor" and claimed to support Ukraine's sovereignty and territorial integrity.

In its foreign policy manifesto, Smer calls for understanding with countries that have forms of government different from parliamentary democracy, specifically mentioning China and Vietnam. During his premiership, party leader Robert Fico repeatedly praised the political systems of both countries, describing Slovakia's system as clumsy and uncompetitive by comparison. He has called for aspects of these systems to be adopted in Slovakia.

In the 2000s, the party opposed the Iraq War and the War in Afghanistan, and organized the withdrawal of 110 Slovak soldiers that were deployed in Iraq. In 2007, Fico made an official state visit to Libya, where he met with then-leader Muammar Gaddafi. During the visit, Fico spoke of "the fight against world imperialism" as a topic of mutual interest.

==== European affiliation ====
Smer joined the Party of European Socialists (PES) in 2009. It remained a member in good standing for 14 years. However, in October 2023, Smer was suspended from PES and the affiliated Progressive Alliance of Socialists and Democrats (S&D) European Parliament group after it entered into coalition with the Slovak National Party, an ultranationalist party, in the Slovak National Council.

After the 2024 European Parliament election, Smer unsuccessfully sought to rejoin the S&D group. Smer subsequently declined to join the newly-formed Patriots for Europe group, led by the Hungarian national-conservative Fidesz party, stating that it would not join a non-leftist group. Nevertheless, Smer maintains close ties with Fidesz; Viktor Orbán, Fidesz's longtime leader and prime minister of Hungary, delivered a video address to the Smer party conference in November 2024.

In September 2024, Smer began negotiations with two other parties in the Non-Inscrits, the German Bündnis Sahra Wagenknecht and the Czech Stačilo!, on establishing cooperation between left-wing conservative parties.

One year later, in September 2025, it was reported that PES had voted to expel Smer from the party. The decision was ratified at a PES party conference held in mid-October 2025. After the formal expulsion of Smer from the PES, Fico instructed Smer MEPs to seek a new European Parliament group, with Monika Beňová expressing preference for accepting an offer from the Patriots for Europe, though Beňová noted that her colleagues were still negotiating the formation of an entirely new political group. Smer MEPs Katarína Roth Neveďalová and Ľuboš Blaha subsequently expressed opposition to joining Patriots for Europe. Smer leader Robert Fico was reportedly in "ongoing consultations" with Fidesz leader Viktor Orbán about joining the group, though Fico remained undecided. According to Beňová, the party ultimately decided to postpone its decision until September 2026.

==== Ministry of Foreign Affairs personnel changes ====
During the tenure of Juraj Blanár, the vice-chairman of Smer, as Minister of Foreign and European Affairs, the ministry saw significant personnel changes that sparked controversy. Several diplomats perceived as pro-Western, including openly gay employees and those with disabilities, were dismissed amid allegations of discrimination related to sexual orientation, age, and political views. Nine former diplomats filed a lawsuit claiming unjust dismissals.

Concurrently, the ministry recruited around 146 new staff members, many of whom graduated from Russian institutions such as MGIMO and St. Petersburg University, reflecting a shift towards closer ties with Russia.

==== Appearances in Russian-aligned media ====
Leading figures of the Smer party, including the PM and party's leader Robert Fico and the deputy leader and MEP Ľuboš Blaha, have maintained a presence on media platforms in Slovakia known for promoting Russian-aligned narratives. Among these outlets are Hlavné Správy (Main News) and Infovojna (Infowar), both widely recognized as prominent sources of disinformation and Russian propaganda in Slovakia. Despite Hlavné Správy and Infovojna having been temporarily suspended by the National Security Authority in accordance with the Cyber Security Act following the onset of the Russian invasion of Ukraine in February 2022 due to identified harmful activity, the leaders continue to utilize these platforms for communication after the suspension was lifted. In December 2023, Robert Fico appeared on Infovojna, where he expressed appreciation towards "alternative media" for "correcting the distortions we have in the media market."

Additionally, in October 2024, Fico appeared on Russia's state-owned television network, Rossiya 1, during the program 60 Minutes, hosted by Olga Skabeyeva. Fico criticized Western support for Ukraine, questioned the effectiveness of sanctions against Russia, and accused the West of "prolonging the war" in Ukraine. His appearance marked the first by a political leader from an EU and NATO country on Russian television since the invasion of Ukraine in 2022, drawing significant criticism both domestically and internationally.

In October 2025, Richard Glück, Smer MP and chair of the parliamentary Committee on Defence and Security, attended a gala in Moscow celebrating the 20th anniversary of the Russian state television network RT, where President Vladimir Putin also spoke. During an interview with RT, Glück criticized Slovak and Western media for alleged bias over the war in Ukraine and praised pro-Russian “alternative media.” He said he travelled privately, and the visit was not an official parliamentary trip.

=== Social policy ===
Smer is considered a left-conservative party with a record of anti-LGBT, Islamophobic, anti-immigration and anti-Romani statements and policies. It proclaims its opposition to liberalism and progressivism, frequently targeting media and NGOs that it associates with these positions. Party's leading politicians spread disinformation and conspiracy theories, including antisemitic George Soros conspiracy theories. It draws on Slovak folk traditions, idealizes the nation's history and openly supports the Catholic bishops.

During its time in power, the party, in cooperation with the Christian Democratic Movement (KDH), passed constitutional amendments defining marriage exclusively as a union between a man and a woman, legally recognizing only two biological sexes, banning surrogacy, restricting adoption to married heterosexual couples, strengthening parental control over education, and asserting Slovak sovereignty over EU law in cultural and ethical matters.

It also introduced a law requiring NGOs to submit annual transparency reports disclosing donors contributing over €5,000, as well as information about their leadership and funding sources; the Public Defender of Rights challenged the measure at the Constitutional Court, arguing it violated constitutional and human rights by threatening donor privacy and disproportionately burdening smaller organizations.

During the 2015 European migrant crisis, party's leader Robert Fico stated that the government monitors every single Muslim who is on the territory of the Slovak Republic. In 2016, Fico declared that Islam has no place in Slovakia, challenged multiculturalism and called for the preservation of the country's traditions and identity. In 2016, the party's government passed a law amendment raising the minimum membership requirement for churches and religious organizations seeking registration in Slovakia from 20,000 to 50,000 adult members with permanent residence.

In 2016, Fico described Romani people as "welfare abusers" and supported increased police interventions in Romani settlements, calling for a tougher approach and rejecting political correctness. In 2019, Fico also endorsed anti-Romani remarks made by former far-right MP Milan Mazurek, who was convicted for disparaging comments targeting the community; this endorsement led to criminal charges against Fico for defamation and incitement to racial hatred, which were eventually dismissed.

During the COVID-19 pandemic, the party opposed vaccinations and restrictive measures.

It opposed the ratification of the Istanbul Convention in Slovakia.

==== Links to Daniel Bombic ====
Several prominent figures from Smer have appeared in interviews, livestreams, or videos hosted by Daniel Bombic — also known as Danny Kollár — a Slovak far-right commentator based in London who is the subject of three international arrest warrants for alleged offences related to extremism, cyberbullying, and doxing. Bombic has been reported to promote conspiracy theories including those involving COVID-19 misinformation, the Great Replacement, the New World Order, and an alleged international Jewish conspiracy. During the COVID-19 pandemic, he was accused of inciting attacks and spreading hate speech against doctors, public health officials, and other public figures.

Smer politicians who have appeared on Bombic's channels include Prime Minister Robert Fico, Deputy Prime Minister and Minister of Defence Robert Kaliňák, MP and Deputy Speaker of the National Council Tibor Gašpar, and MEP Judita Laššáková. Laššáková has maintained a long-term collaboration with Bombic, co-hosting interviews with conspiracy theorists and political figures, and stated that she would not rule out appointing him as an assistant in the European Parliament.

Bombic's return to Slovakia in early 2025 was reported to have been facilitated using a government aircraft, and he received legal and housing assistance from a law firm co-owned by Robert Kaliňák.

==== Meeting with Andrew Tate ====
In August 2025, the party's deputy leader, MEP, and Chairman of the Prime Minister's Advisory Council, Erik Kaliňák, along with MP and Chairman of the Parliamentary Defense and Security Committee, Richard Glück, met with American manosphere media personality Andrew Tate and his brother, Tristan Tate. After publishing a photograph from the meeting on Facebook, Glück commented: “I respect everyone; people can think whatever they want. I agree with many things Andrew Tate and his brother say, but of course, I do not agree with the exaggerated misogyny.” Kaliňák described the discussions as “well-founded,” covering not only Slovak and Romanian politics but also the future of Europe in the context of current European leadership. He added that the conversation also touched on the United States, where “these personalities are relatively highly regarded.”

==== Communist nostalgia ====
Following a major internal split that resulted in the founding of a new party named Voice – Social Democracy (Hlas), the party began to radicalize its rhetoric, including expressing nostalgia for the prior communist state.

The party politicians utilize slogans reminiscent of the communist era, such as "Loiterers from cafes, to fields and factories" and the greeting "Greetings, comrades! Honor work!"

In January 2024, Prime Minister and party chairman Robert Fico and Deputy Speaker of the National Council and party vice-chairman Ľuboš Blaha visited the grave of Gustav Husák, the last communist president of the Czechoslovakia, to pay their respects. Husák was a key figure in the normalization process in Czechoslovakia – a return to strict Communist Party control and the suppression of political liberalization following the Warsaw Pact invasion in 1968.

In November 2023, Blaha replaced a portrait of President Zuzana Čaputová in his parliamentary office with a portrait of Argentine Marxist revolutionary Che Guevara.

In his speech at the Smer-organized commemoration of the anniversary of the Slovak National Uprising in August 2023, Blaha addressed the crowd as "comrades" and stated, "The basic historical truth is that war and fascism have always come from the West and freedom and peace from the East."

In December 2019, Blaha shared a photograph on Facebook depicting himself alongside Fico, with the former holding a red star bearing a hammer and sickle motif. The star was a birthday gift presented to Blaha by Fico.

== Legal issues ==
Since the 2020 parliamentary election – Smer's return to the opposition, Slovak authorities have been investigating a number of corruption-related crimes. By August 2023, a total of 42 individuals reportedly linked to the party, including policemen, prosecutors, judges, members of the Slovak intelligence agency, politicians, officials, and businessmen were convicted. The party strongly rejects all charges, calling it the criminalization of politics. Numerous criticisms of the investigation process and the Special Prosecutor's Office were outlined in the brochure 'Overview of Violations of the Principles of the Rule of Law in the Years 2020–2023' published by the Ministry of Justice led by Boris Susko of Smer in December 2023.

In March 2023, Deputy Prime Minister and Minister of Defense, Robert Kaliňák, who previously served as Minister of Interior, and businessman Jozef Brhel were formally indicted with bribery. Kaliňák was identified as the intermediary in a bribery scheme involving an annual sum of €200,000, purportedly arranged by Brhel for František Imrecze, who served as the President of the Financial Administration at the time. In return for the alleged bribery, Imrecze facilitated the passing of information regarding entities scheduled for corporate income tax audits and ensured the fulfillment of requirements for filling positions within the Financial Administration with specific individuals recommended by Brhel. In one instance, the Financial Administration then awarded substantial IT contracts to Michal Suchoba's company, Allexis, while Suchoba himself is now a cooperating defendant. Imrecze, also a cooperating defendant, stated that the total amount of bribes involved was €1,100,000. The indictment was also based on the statements of other high-ranking officials, now cooperating defendants: the former director of the Criminal Office of the Financial Administration, Ľudovít Makó, and the former director general of the tax and customs administration section, Daniel Čech. In June 2023, the indictment was quashed by the Supreme Court citing "serious procedural errors that infringed upon the defendants' right to a fair defense". In August 2023, Deputy Prosecutor General Jozef Sedlák canceled the charges for Kaliňák, while Brhel remained charged.

In November 2020, Tibor Gašpar of Smer, a member of the National Council and former Police President, was formally charged with organizing a criminal group. According to the charge, the criminal group composed predominantly of members of the police force was founded by Gašpar in collaboration with businessman Norbert Bödör in 2012. The alleged activities of the group involved serving the interests of Bödör while engaging in illegal activities such as obstructing investigations into tax evasion, extortion, bribery, and utilizing police resources and technology for their operations. Gašpar and Bödör were purportedly at the top of the three tiers hierarchical criminal group. In one instance, allegations suggested that a private company, Interstore Group, sought to evade a criminal investigation. It was alleged that their request was to be fulfilled through a €400,000 bribe distributed among the members of the group, with Gašpar receiving €90,000 through an intermediary. In November 2022, Prosecutor General Maroš Žilinka canceled the charges in compliance with the proposal of Prime Minister and party chairman Robert Fico and Deputy Prime Minister and Minister of Defence Robert Kaliňák. Žilinka described the charges as vague and imprecise, stating that they violated the basic principles of criminal proceedings.

In December 2023, Gašpar was accused of breaching the confidentiality of oral expression and other expression of a personal nature by complicity.

In April 2022, Robert Fico, Robert Kaliňák, Tibor Gašpar and Norbert Bödör were officially charged with endangering commercial, banking, postal, telecommunications and tax secrets, with Fico and Kaliňák additionally charged with organizing a criminal group and abuse of authority. Fico and Kaliňák allegedly misused state authorities and collaborated with other members of the group to illegally acquire information aimed at discrediting political adversaries, namely the then opposition leaders Igor Matovič and Andrej Kiska. In November 2022, Prosecutor General Maroš Žilinka canceled the charges in compliance with the proposal of Fico and Kaliňák.

In April 2023, Peter Kažimír, former Minister of Finance and former vice-chairman of the party, was convicted by the Specialized Criminal Court for bribery. According to the indictment supported by the testimony of cooperating defendant František Imrecze, Kažimír allegedly gave a bribe of €48,000 to Imrecze, who was then the President of the Financial Administration. The alleged purpose of the bribe was to expedite and ensure a favorable outcome in tax appeal proceedings concerning two private companies. Kažimír denied all the charges and appealed against the verdict. As of 2024, the trial is still ongoing.

In 2021, Bernard Slobodník, a cooperating defendant who formerly served as the director of the National Financial Police Unit, testified that State Secretary of Justice Pavol Gašpar of Smer, son of Tibor Gašpar, was supposed to hand over a bribe of €60,000 in exchange for information from the investigation. An investigation into the allegation was not initiated because it was already time-barred.

Monika Jankovská of Smer, former State Secretary of Justice and former member of the National Council, testified about the alleged involvement in corrupt practices within the judiciary, admitting her own criminal activity.

== Election results ==
=== National Council ===
Election	Leader	Votes	%	Rank	Seats	+/–	Status
2002	Robert Fico	387,100	13.5	3rd	25 / 150		Opposition
2006	Robert Fico	671,185	29.1	1st	50 / 150	▲25	Smer–SNS–ĽS HZDS
2010	Robert Fico	880,111	34.8	1st	62 / 150	▲12	Opposition
2012	Robert Fico	1,134,280	44.4	1st	83 / 150	▲21	Smer
2016	Robert Fico	737,481	28.3	1st	49 / 150	▼34	Smer–SNS–Most Híd–Network (2016)
2016	Robert Fico	737,481	28.3	1st	49 / 150	▼34	Smer–SNS–Most Híd (2016–2020)
2020	Peter Pellegrini	527,172	18.3	2nd	38 / 150	▼11	Opposition
2023	Robert Fico	681,017	23.0	1st	42 / 150	▲4	Smer–Hlas–SNS

=== European Parliament ===
Election	List leader	Votes	%	Rank	Seats	+/–	EP Group
2004	Monika Beňová	118,535	16.9	3rd	3 / 14		PES
2009	Boris Zala	264,722	32.0	1st	5 / 13	▲2	S&D
2014	Maroš Šefčovič	135,089	24.1	1st	4 / 13	▼1	S&D
2019	Monika Beňová	154,996	15.7	2nd	3 / 14	▼1	S&D
2024	Monika Beňová	365,794	24.8	2nd	5 / 15	▲2	NI

=== President ===
Election	Candidate	First round			Second round		
Election	Candidate	Votes	%	Rank	Votes	%	Rank
2004	Endorsed Ivan Gašparovič	442,564	22.3	2nd	1,079,592	59.9	1st
2009	Endorsed Ivan Gašparovič	876,061	46.7	1st	1,234,787	55.5	1st
2014	Robert Fico	531,919	28.0	1st	893,841	40.6	2nd
2019	Endorsed; Maroš Šefčovič (Note: Although Maroš Šefčovič was officially an independent, his campaign was funded by the party.)	400,379	18.7	2nd	752,403	41.6	2nd
2024	Endorsed; Peter Pellegrini	834,718	37.0	2nd	1,409,255	53.1	1st

== See also ==
- Alliance of Independent Social Democrats
- Czech Social Democratic Party
- Politics of Slovakia
