= Oued es Segui =

Oued es Segui is a wadi in Tunisia and is nearby to Henchir el Adame Bou Krelal, Henchir el Haramine and Henchir Bou Zaïane. Oued es Segui is also close to Oued er Rebaï river and Enfidete Djibinia ech Chott.

The Wadi is located at 35.788333n and 9.928889e and flows near Kairouan.

The Segui Formation is a Miocene-Pliocene era geological structure first proposed by Burollet in 1956 and it sits near the Oued es Segui in the Bled Segui tribal area of Tunisia.
