= Danubius University (Slovakia) =

Private College in Sládkovičovo, Slovakia

Coordinates: 48.2027°N 17.6319°E

- Vysoká škola Danubius
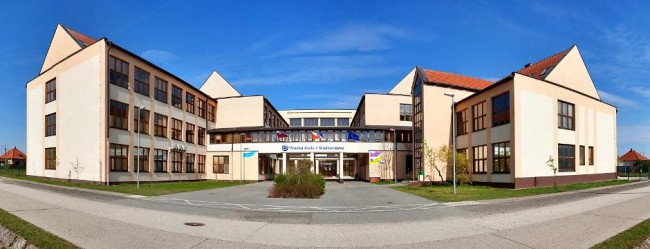
- Other name: DU
- Former name: University of Sládkovičovo (2005-2014)
- Type: Private university
- Established: 31 May 2005; 21 years ago
- Academic affiliations: Erasmus Programme
- Rector: Peter Plavčan
- Students: 452
- Location: Sládkovičovo, Slovakia
- Website: vsdanubius.eu

The Danubius University (until 2014 University of Sládkovičovo) is a private university established in 2005 in Sládkovičovo.

The university has three faculties:

- Janko Jesenský Faculty of Law
- Faculty of Public Policy and Public Administration
- Faculty of Social Studies

== Controversy ==
Between 2007 and 2015, the university maintained a Czech campus in Brno, granting Law degrees to many leading politicians of Czech Social Democratic Party. The campus was denied Czech accreditation due to serious concerns about the quality of education provided there.

In the midst of 2020 plagiarism scandals of the Speaker of the National Council Boris Kollár, the Prime Minister Igor Matovič vowed to close down "artificial universities that deform the education system", including the Danubius University. Nonetheless, the school remained open and continued receiving generous subsidies from the Government.

Danubius university denied all allegations, stating it provides high quality education and since its relaunch under the new name in 2015, it "no longer has any political connections."
