= National Bank of Slovakia =

Central Bank of Slovakia

National Bank of Slovakia Národná banka Slovenska

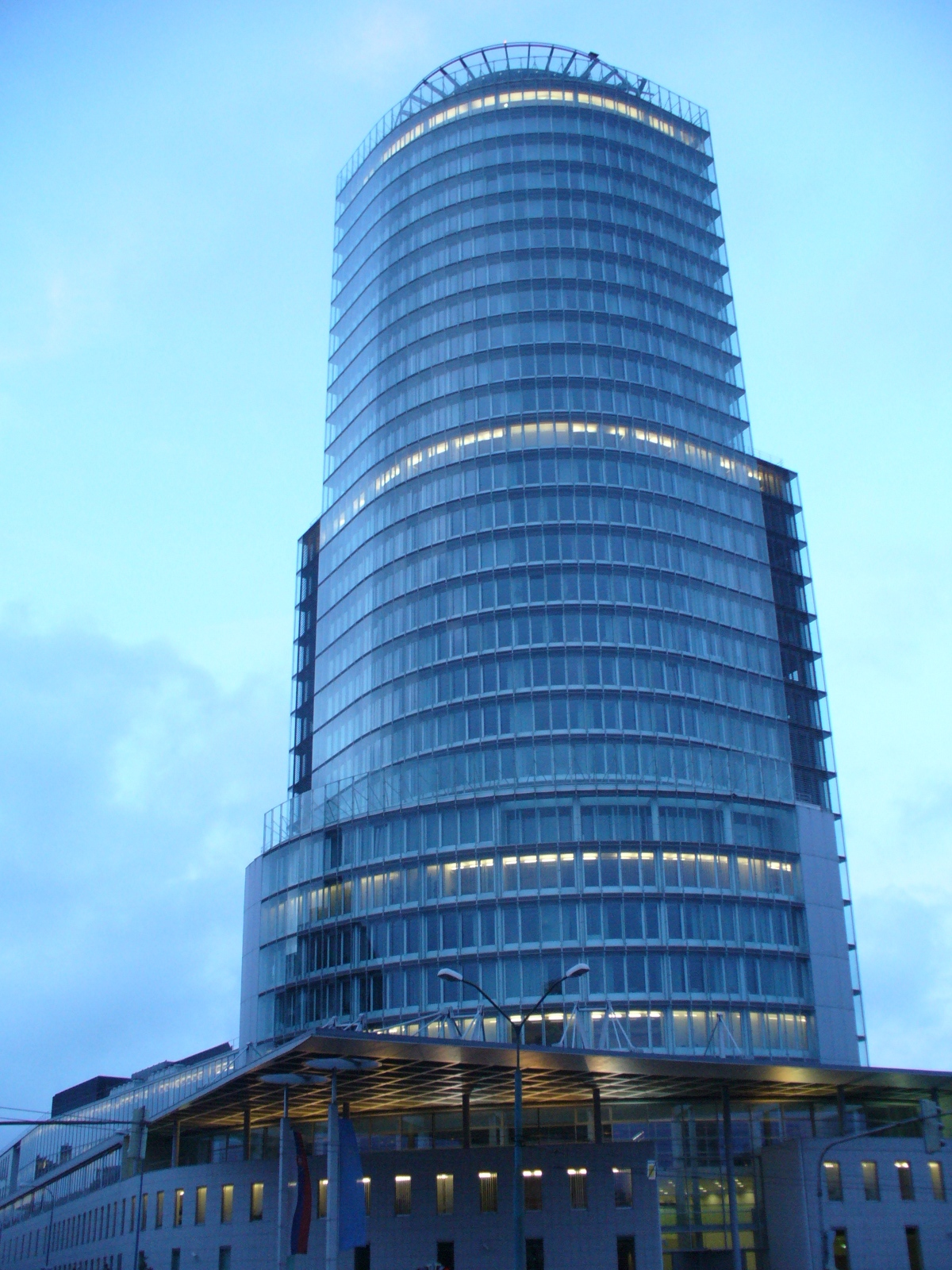
- National Bank of Slovakia headquarters
- Central bank of: Slovakia
- Headquarters: Bratislava
- Coordinates: 48.153333°N 17.115°E
- Established: 1 January 1993; 33 years ago
- Ownership: 100% state ownership
- Governor: Peter Kažimír
- Reserves: €15.54 billion (30 April 2026)
- Preceded by: State Bank of Czechoslovakia, 1950–1992
- Succeeded by: European Central Bank (2009)^{1}
- Website: nbs.sk/en/
- ^{1}Národná banka Slovenska still exists but many functions have been taken over by the ECB.

National Bank of Slovakia (Slovak: Národná banka Slovenska, NBS) is the national central bank for Slovakia within the Eurosystem. It was the Slovak central bank from 1993 to 2008, issuing the koruna. It was formed on 1 January 1993 from the division of the State Bank of Czechoslovakia as part of the process of dissolution of Czechoslovakia, together with the Czech National Bank.

In addition to its monetary role, the NBS is also a financial supervisory authority. In that capacity, it increasingly implements policies set at the European Union level. It is the national competent authority for Slovakia within European Banking Supervision. It is a voting member of the respective Boards of Supervisors of the European Banking Authority (EBA), European Insurance and Occupational Pensions Authority (EIOPA), and European Securities and Markets Authority (ESMA). It provides the permanent single common representative for Slovakia in the Supervisory composition of the General Board of the Anti-Money Laundering Authority (AMLA). It is a member of the European Systemic Risk Board (ESRB).

The NBS also hosts the Slovak Resolution Council (Slovak: rada pre riešenie krízových situácií, lit. 'council for the resolution of crisis situations'), Slovakia's designated National Resolution Authority and plenary session member of the Single Resolution Board (SRB).

== Name ==
The bank doesn't call itself the National Bank of Slovakia in English but uses its Slovak name Národná banka Slovenska in its English communications. It is not to be confused with the Slovak National Bank, the short-lived central bank of the Slovak Republic (1939–1945) that was carved out from the National Bank of Czechoslovakia.

== Organization ==
=== Governing bodies ===
The supreme governing body of the National Bank of Slovakia is the Bank Board, which formulates monetary policy, applies appropriate instruments, and rules on monetary measures. It is composed of the Governor and a Vice-Governor, and other three members. Since the introduction of euro in 2009, the Governor of the NBS has been an ex-officio member of the Governing Council of the European Central Bank

=== Appointments ===
The Governor and a Vice-Governor are appointed and can be under certain circumstances dismissed by the President of Slovakia at the proposal of the Government and subject to the approval of the Slovak Parliament. The remaining three members are appointed and dismissed by the Slovak government following the proposal of the Governor. The term of appointment for bank board members is six years (five years before 1 January 2015). The number of subsequent terms is not limited for board members, but the Governor and Deputy Governor are allowed to serve only for two terms.

=== Regional footprint ===
In addition to its headquarters in Bratislava, the National Bank has 5 regional offices.

== Resolution Council ==
The Slovak Resolution Council is hosted by the NBS, but operates under an autonomous governance framework, and thus counts as a separate authority.

The Resolution Council was established on 1 January 2015. The implementation of its decisions is delegated to the Crisis Resolution Department of the NBS Regulation Department. In addition to its role as bank resolution authority, the Resolution Council was designated as national resolution authority for central counterparties with effect at 12 August 2022. The same 2022 legislation granted the Council additional authority to impose financial penalties.

== Headquarters ==
The headquarters of the National Bank of Slovakia was opened on 23 May 2002 in Bratislava. At a height of 111.6 metres and with 33 floors, it was the highest office building in Bratislava until 2020, when it was surpassed by Nivy Tower.

== Governors ==
- Vladimír Masár, 29 July 1993 - 29 July 1999
- Marián Jusko, 30 July 1999 - 31 December 2004
- Ivan Šramko, 1 January 2005 - 11 January 2010
- Jozef Makúch, 12 January 2010 - 01 June 2019
- Peter Kažimír, Since 1st June 2019

== See also ==
- Slovak koruna
- Slovak euro coins
- List of banks in Slovakia
- Economy of Slovakia
- List of central banks
- List of financial supervisory authorities by country
