= Bratislava University of Economics and Business =

University in Bratislava, Slovakia

- Ekonomická univerzita v Bratislave
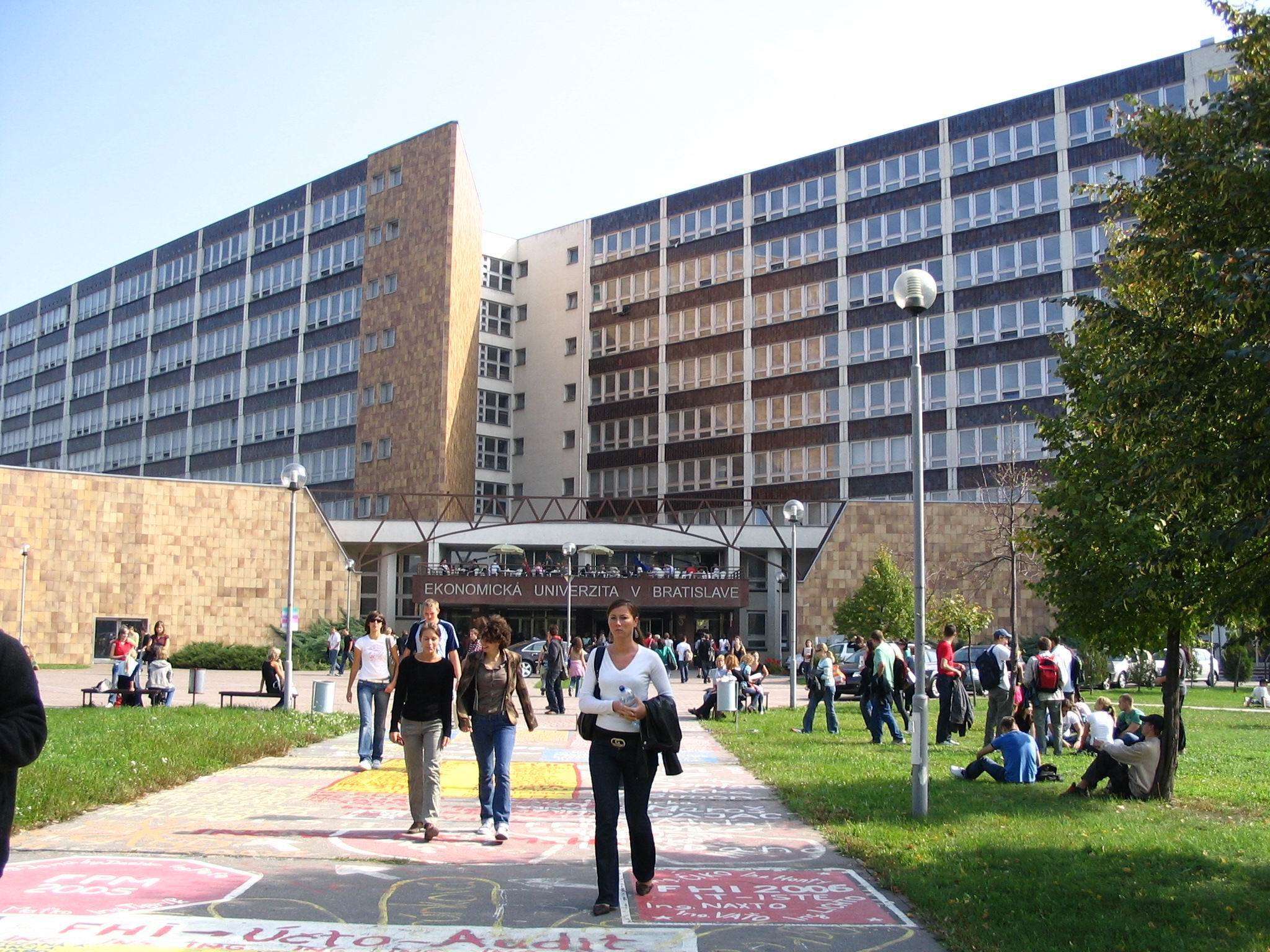
- Type: Public
- Established: 1940
- Accreditation: AACSB, ACCA
- Affiliations: ERASMUS, AACSB, ACCA
- Rector: Ferdinand Daňo
- Total staff: 425
- Students: 6,923
- Doctoral students: 161
- Location: Dolnozemská 1, 852 35 Bratislava 5, Slovak Republic, Central Europe, Bratislava, Slovakia; 48°7′35″N 17°7′59″E
- Colors
- Nickname: EUBA
- Website: www.euba.sk

The Bratislava University of Economics and Business (Slovak: Ekonomická univerzita v Bratislave) is the oldest university of economics in Slovakia.

== History ==
The university was established in 1940 as a private university under the name Vysoká obchodná škola v Bratislave (College of Commerce in Bratislava), to serve Slovak students because of the closure of colleges and universities in the German-occupied Protectorate of Bohemia and Moravia. It was nationalized in 1945 and renamed to Slovenská vysoká škola obchodná (Slovak College of Commerce). It was renamed in 1949 to Vysoká škola hospodárskych vied (College of Business / Economic Sciences) and once again in 1952 to Vysoká škola ekonomická (College of Economics). The current name has been used since 1992.

== University Board ==
- Prof. Ing. Ferdinand Daňo, PhD. – Rector of the Bratislava University of Economics and Business
- Assoc. Prof. Mgr. Boris Mattoš, PhD. – Statutory Representative of the Rector and Vice-rector for International Relations
- Assoc. Prof. Mgr. Ing. Zuzana Juhászová, PhD. – Vice-rector for Education
- Assoc. Prof. Ing. Paula Puškárová, DiS. art., Ph.D. – Vice-rector for Research and Doctoral Studies
- Assoc. Prof. Ing. Jana Péliová, PhD. – Vice-rector for Accreditation and Quality
- Ing. Jakub Kintler, PhD. – Vice-rector for Development, Culture and Sport
- Ing. Mária Dziurová – Head of the University Administration and Finance

== Structure ==
- Faculty of Economics and Finance
- Faculty of Commerce
- Faculty of Economic Informatics
- Faculty of Business Management
- Faculty of International Relations
- Faculty of Applied Languages
- Faculty of Business Economics with seat in Košice
