= Cabinet of Ľudovít Ódor =

2023 Slovakian caretaker government

- 13th Cabinet of Slovakia

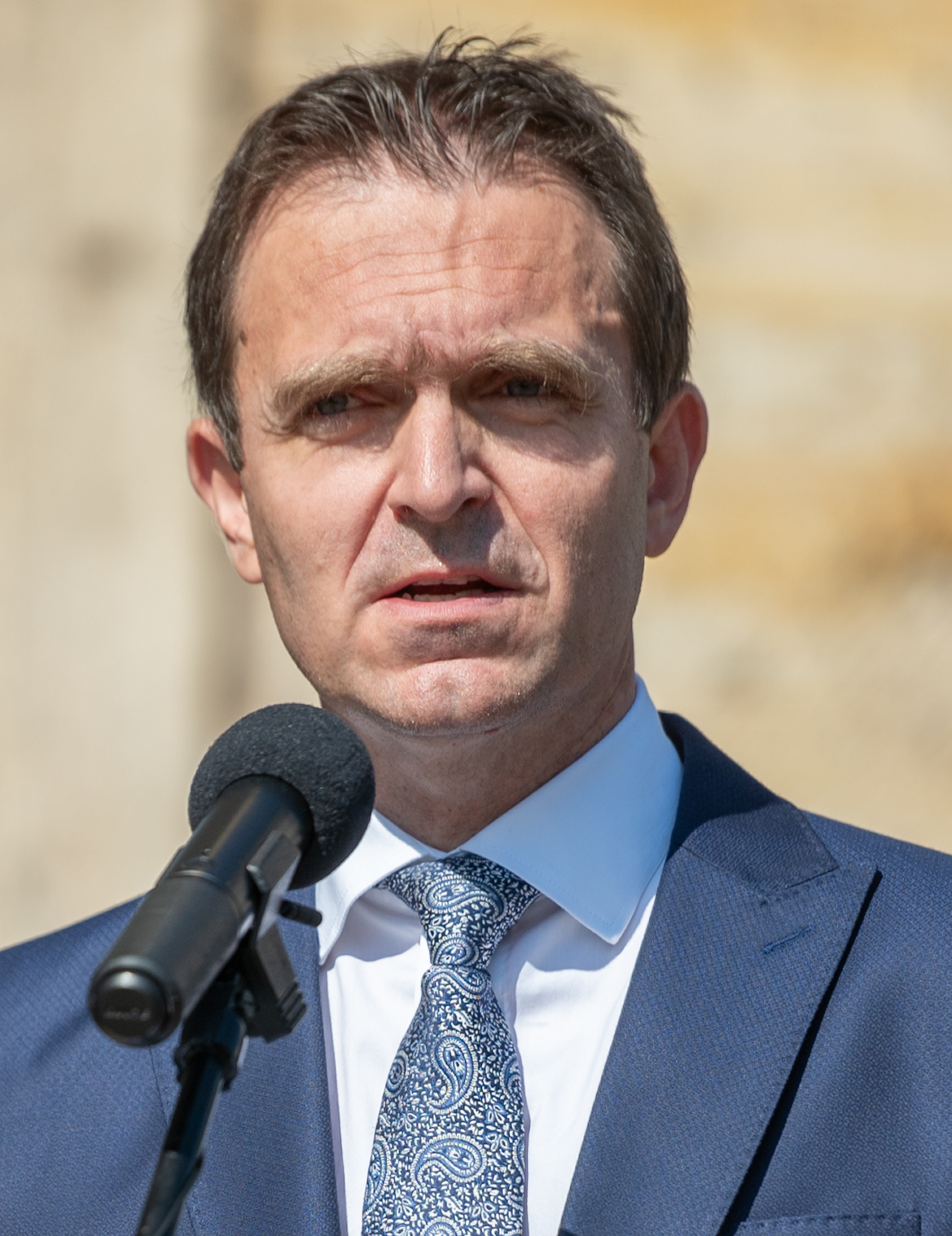
- Date formed: 15 May 2023
- Date dissolved: 25 October 2023

People and organisations
- President of Slovakia: Zuzana Čaputová
- Prime Minister: Ľudovít Ódor
- Deputy Prime Minister: Lívia Vašáková
- No. of ministers: 16
- Status in legislature: Caretakers

History
- Predecessor: Heger's Cabinet
- Successor: Fico's Fourth Cabinet

The Cabinet of Ľudovít Ódor was the 13th government of Slovakia. It was a technocrat caretaker government composed of experts appointed by President Zuzana Čaputová on 15 May 2023.

On 15 June, the National Council did not express confidence in the government. Ódor's Cabinet remained in power as interim government with restricted powers until it was succeeded by Fico's Fourth Cabinet following the snap election held on 30 September.

== Composition ==
Portfolio	Minister	Took office	Left office	Party
Government's Office
Prime Minister	Ľudovít Ódor	15 May 2023	25 October 2023	Independent
Deputy Prime Minister
Deputy Prime Minister for European Union Subsidies and the Recovery Plan	Lívia Vašáková	15 May 2023	25 October 2023	Independent
Ministry of Foreign and European Affairs
Minister of Foreign and European Affairs	Miroslav Wlachovský	15 May 2023	25 October 2023	Independent
Ministry of Interior
Minister of Interior	Ivan Šimko	15 May 2023	19 July 2023	Independent
Minister of Interior	Ľudovít Ódor (Note: Acting minister.)	19 July 2023	25 October 2023	Independent
Ministry of Defence
Minister of Defence	Martin Sklenár	15 May 2023	25 October 2023	Independent
Ministry of Economy
Minister of Economy	Peter Dovhun	15 May 2023	25 October 2023	Independent
Ministry of Finance
Minister of Finance	Michal Horváth	15 May 2023	25 October 2023	Independent
Ministry of Transport and Construction
Minister of Transport	Pavol Lančarič	15 May 2023	25 October 2023	Independent
Ministry of Agriculture and Rural Development
Minister of Agriculture and Rural Development	Jozef Bíreš	15 May 2023	25 October 2023	Independent
Ministry of Investment, Regional Development and Informatics
Minister of Investments, Regional Development and Informatization	Peter Balík	15 May 2023	25 October 2023	Independent
Ministry of Justice
Minister of Justice	Jana Dubovcová	15 May 2023	25 October 2023	Independent
Ministry of Labour, Social Affairs and Family
Minister of Labour, Social Affairs and Family	Soňa Gaborčáková	15 May 2023	25 October 2023	Independent
Ministry of the Environment
Minister of Environment	Milan Chrenko	15 May 2023	25 October 2023	Independent
Ministry of Education, Research, Development and Youth
Minister of Education, Science, Research and Sport	Daniel Bútora	15 May 2023	25 October 2023	Independent
Ministry of Culture
Minister of Culture	Silvia Hroncová	15 May 2023	25 October 2023	Independent
Ministry of Health
Minister of Health	Michal Palkovič	15 May 2023	25 October 2023	Independent

== Confidence motion ==
Motion of confidence Ľudovít Ódor
Ballot →	15 June 2023
Required majority →	69 out of 136 (simple)
Yes: • SaS (19); • Independents (15)	34 / 150
No: • SMER-SD (26); • Independents (17)	43 / 150
Absentions: • OĽaNO (30); • SMER-SD (1); • Sme Rodina (15); • Independents (13)	59 / 150
Absentees: • OĽaNO (5); • SaS (1); • Sme Rodina (1); • Independents (7)	14 / 150

== Removal of Interior Minister ==
On 19 July 2023, President Čaputová revoked the appointment of Minister of Interior Ivan Šimko after Prime Minister Ódor formally requested that she take this step. The reason for this was that more than twenty top police officials were ready to resign.

=== Tensions between Šimko and police officials ===
Following an invasive police operation during which Agricultural Paying Agency (PPA) officials under the Ministry of Agriculture were detained in June 2023, Minister of Agriculture Jozef Bíreš asked Minister Šimko to inform him about the appropriateness of the operation’s invasive tactics. Šimko then officially invited the Police President Štefan Hamran into a meeting with himself and Bíreš, which Hamran refused to attend.

Hamran later stated that he regarded this invitation as inappropriate and contributing to distrust between himself and the minister. Bíreš and Šimko denied having any intention of asking about the specifics of open criminal investigations, which Hamran confirmed.

PM Ódor explained that Šimko asking Hamran to attend the meeting was not appropriate and that he should have pointed Bíreš to publicly available information about the police operation rather than contact Hamran and ask him to explain the actions of the police in such a meeting.

Temporary Director of Police Inspection Service Peter Juhás, who was also ready to resign, explained that tensions between himself and Šimko grew after Šimko initially refused to appoint Pavol Ďurka, a police investigator from the National Crime Agency (NAKA) against whom criminal proceedings were being led, to a position at the Inspection Service which investigates crimes committed by police officers. In their conversation about the appointment, Šimko mentioned that he could potentially consult the matter with Prosecutor General Maroš Žilinka to gather more information. Juhás found this suggestion unacceptable because consulting personal appointments within the forces active under the Ministry of Interior with officials belonging to unrelated institutions was not warranted. The police leadership under Hamran, along with Juhás, were publicly known to regard the active investigation led by the General Prosecutor's Office under Žilinka against Pavol Ďurka and his colleagues from NAKA as unlawful and arbitrary.

The open case against the NAKA investigative officers started after they investigated the still-ongoing criminal case widely known as Purgatory (Slovak: Očistec), which involves the former police leadership suspected to have operated as an organized criminal group during the years under the rule of former PM Robert Fico's governments. (The accused in the Purgatory case include the former Police President Tibor Gašpar and his relative Norbert Bödör, an influential businessman from Nitra alleged to have controlled the police, as well as other former top police officials.) In July 2023, the case against the NAKA investigators continued more than a year and half after the Regional Court, in its decision not to take the accused into custody, stated that the proceedings were unlawful. Further, the defense council was not given the full audio recordings on which the accusations were based by the prosecution for a long period of time. It was also revealed that the prosecution incorrectly transcribed the recordings in its official documents, creating an appearance of existing evidence against the investigators. For these reasons the case was widely reported on in the Slovak news media and is considered contentious.

=== Šimko’s social media posts ===
The tensions between Šimko and the police officials became public in July after he published posts on Facebook in which he stated that the police need to be under political control. This occurred after the murder of a woman in Dubnica and Váhom by her mentally unstable male acquaintance. Police President Hamran explained that the woman, who was in contact with the police before her murder due to being stalked by the man, was given help by the responsible officer beyond the requirements of the law, and that the murder occurred after the man was released by a mental institution where it was assessed that he was not a danger to others. Šimko’s posts came as a reaction to a social media post by the sister of the murdered woman in which she criticized the police.

After his appointment was revoked, Šimko corrected his statement to avoid misinterpretation, saying that the police need to be under civilian control enacted by democratically elected representatives without interfering in open cases, while the police act only within the limits of the law.
