= Euro gold and silver commemorative coins (Slovakia) =

Slovak Republic Slovenská republika
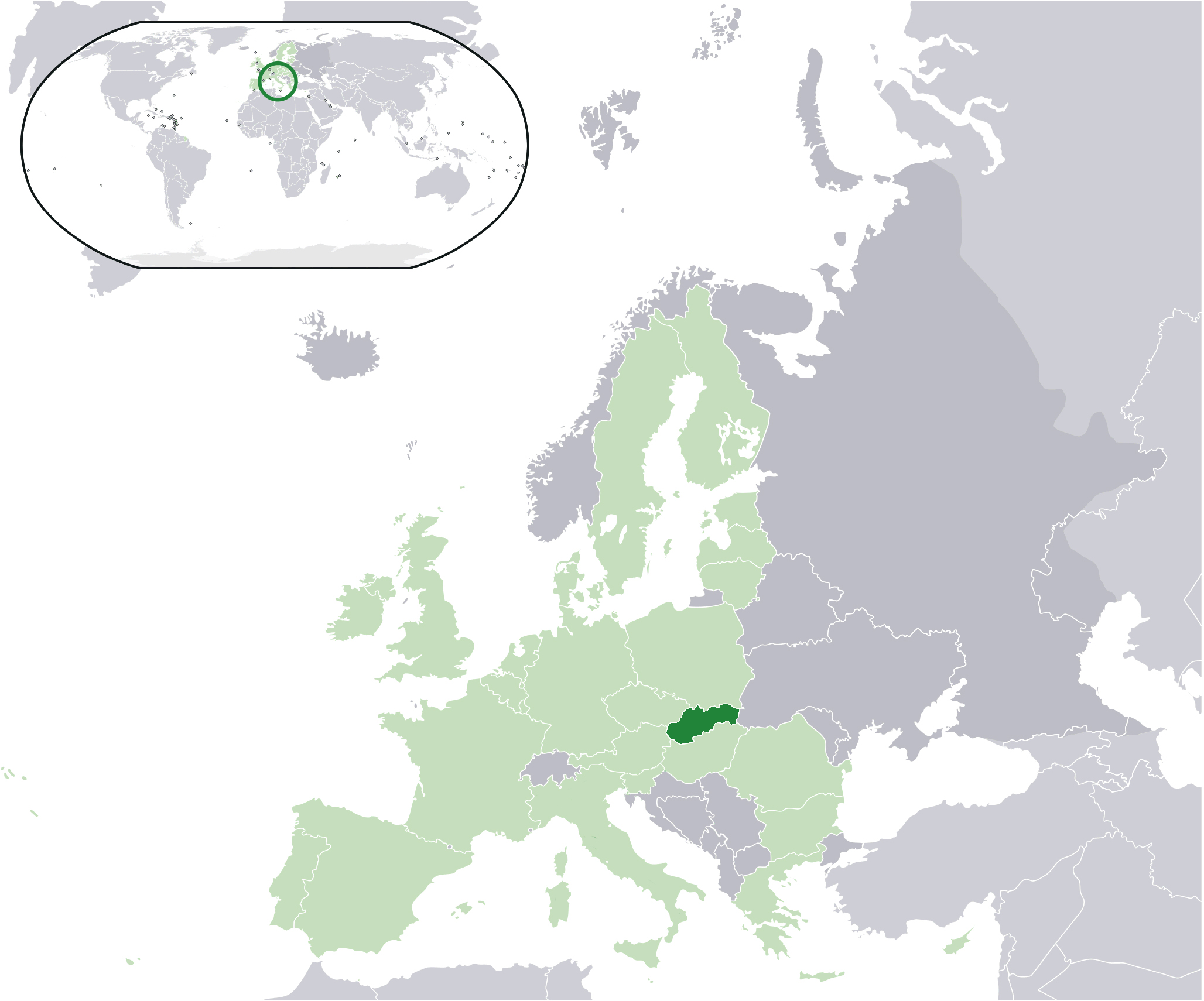
- ISO 3166 code: SK

Euro gold and silver commemorative coins are special euro coins minted and issued by member states of the Eurozone, mainly in gold and silver, although other precious metals are also used on rare occasions. Slovakia introduced the euro (€) on 1 January 2009. The National Bank of Slovakia, together with the Kremnica Mint, issue both normal issues of Slovak euro coins, which are intended for circulation, and commemorative euro coins in gold and silver.

These special coins have a legal tender only in Slovakia, unlike the normal issues of the Slovak euro coins, which have a legal tender in every country of the Eurozone. This means that the commemorative coins made of gold and silver cannot be used as money in other countries. Furthermore, as their bullion value generally vastly exceeds their face value, these coins are not intended to be used as means of payment at all—although it remains possible. For this reason, they are usually named Collectors' coins.

The coins usually commemorate the anniversaries of historical events or draw attention to current events of special importance. Slovakia has announced that two of these coins will be minted in 2009, both in silver, with face value of 10 and 20 euros.

== Summary ==
As of 9 October 2008, 2 variations of Slovak commemorative coins have been scheduled to be minted in 2009. These special high-value commemorative coins are not to be confused with €2 commemorative coins, which are coins designated for circulation and do have legal tender status in all countries of the Eurozone.

The following table shows the number of coins minted per year. In the first section, the coins are grouped by the metal used, while in the second section they are grouped by their face value.

Year	Issues	By metal			By face value		
Year	Issues	gold	silver	others	€100	€20	€10
2009	2	-	2	-	-	1	1
2010	4	1	3	-	1	1	2
2011*	1	-	1	-	0	0	1
Total	7	1	5	0	1	2	4
Coins were minted / No coins were minted

== 2009 coinage ==
front back	Aurel Stodola – the 150th anniversary of the birth			
front back	Author: Miroslav Ronai / Engraver: Dalibor Schmidt		Mint: Kremnica Mint	
front back	Value: €10	Alloy: Ag 900, Cu 100	Quantity: 13 300 Proof, 10 100 BU	Quality: Proof and BU
front back	Issued: April 2009	Diameter: 34 mm (1.34 in)	Weight: 18 g (0.63 oz; 0.58 ozt)	Issue value: €x.x
Edge inscription: " - KONŠTRUKTÉR - VYNÁLEZCA - PEDAGÓG" (constructor, inventor, pedagogue). The obverse side of the coin depicts a turbo generator of that time, above which is the national emblem of the Slovak Republic. The name of the state, SLOVENSKO, is placed slanted in the lower left part of the coin, with the year 2009 beneath it. The nominal value of 10 EURO is shown beneath the turbo generator; the number 10 is placed horizontally, and the word EURO in a slanted line is to its right. The mintmark of the Kremnica Mint, MK between two dies, is on the left edge of the coin. The reverse side shows a portrait of Aurel Stodola in the coin centre. To the right of the portrait is a pair of compasses of that time, used in technical drawings, with its arms spread open. The name and surname, AUREL STODOLA, are placed parallel to the compasses´ arms. On the lower left side of the coin, the years of his birth and death 1859 – 1942, appear in two slanted lines. The styled initials of the coin designer Miroslav Ronai MR are placed near the bottom edge of the coin.
front back	Protection of Nature and Landscape – National Park Velka Fatra			
front back	Author: Mgr. art. Roman Lugár / Engraver: Dalibor Schmidt		Mint: Kremnica Mint	
front back	Value: €20	Alloy: Ag 925, Cu 75	Quantity: 12 600 Proof, 9 900 BU	Quality: Proof and BU
front back	Issued: June 2009	Diameter: 40 mm (1.57 in)	Weight: 33.36 g (1.18 oz; 1.07 ozt)	Issue value: €x.x
Edge inscription: "OCHRANA PRÍRODY A KRAJINY" (protection of nature and landscape). Fatra cyclamen, Clusius gentian and common yew, typical representatives of the national park flora, are depicted on the obverse of the coin, in the middle of the coin field in a composition of plants. The national emblem of the Slovak Republic is placed in the right upper half of the coin. The year mark 2009 is above the emblem. The name of the state, SLOVENSKO, is inscribed around the bottom edge of the coin. The mintmark of the Kremnica Mint, MK between two dies, and the styled initials of the first and last name of the author of the coin design, Mgr. art. Roman Lugár, appear to the right of the Clusius gentian image. The reverse side shows a composition of lying golden eagle and Kráľova skala in the middle of the coin field. The nominal value 20 EURO is depicted on the upper edge of the coin. The name of the park NÁRODNÝ PARK VEĽKÁ FATRA is inscribed around the bottom edge of the coin.

== 2010 coinage ==
UNESCO World Heritage - Wooden Churches of the Slovak Part of the Carpathian Mountain Area			
Author: Mgr. art. Patrik Kovačovský / Engraver: Dalibor Schmidt		Mint: Kremnica Mint	
Value: €10	Alloy: Ag 900, Cu 100	Quantity: 17 325 Proof, 9 900 BU	Quality: Proof and BU
Issued: 15 March 2010	Diameter: 34 mm (1.34 in)	Weight: 18 g (0.63 oz; 0.58 ozt)	Issue value: €20 Proof, €17.14 BU
Edge inscription: " - WORLD HERITAGE - PATRIMOINE MONDIAL". The obverse side of the coin depicts on the left side the St. Nicolas Church in Bodružal; to the right is the Church of All Saints in Tvrdošín and above it is the Hronsek church. Near the right edge of the coin is the national emblem of the Slovak Republic, above which is the denomination 10 EURO. The name of the state SLOVENSKO, with a stylized letter "S" suggesting the road connecting individual wooden churches, is located in the lower part of the coin field. The year 2010 is shown beneath. To the left of the letter "S" is the mark of the Europa Coin Programme represented by the European star and the euro symbol. Kremnica mint's mark MK between two dies is located on the left, and the stylized initials of the designer Mgr. art. Patrik Kovacovský, PK, is located to the right of the year. Reverse side depicts on the right side the Church of St. Francis of Assisi in Hervartov and on its left the Church of St. Nicolas in Ruská Bystrá. Beneath it is the writing SVETOVÉ KULTÚRNE DEDIČSTVO (World Cultural Heritage) with a stylized letter "S" suggesting the road connecting individual wooden churches. In the lower part of the coin field is the inscription DREVENÉ CHRÁMY (wooden churches).
Martin Kukučín - the 150th anniversary of the birth			
Author: averz: Miroslav Rónai, reverz: Mgr. art. Peter Valach / Engraver: Dalibor Schmidt		Mint: Kremnica Mint	
Value: €10	Alloy: Ag 900, Cu 100	Quantity: 9 300 Proof, 7 500 BU	Quality: Proof and BU
Issued: 3 May 2010	Diameter: 34 mm (1.34 in)	Weight: 18 g (0.63 oz; 0.58 ozt)	Issue value: €21 Proof
Edge inscription: " - PROZAIK - DRAMATIK - PUBLICISTA". On the obverse of the coin is portrayed a landscape of Brač Island, with the authentic “house on the hillside” known from Martin Kukučín’s work of the same name (Dom v stráni). On the left side is an olive tree supplemented in the lower part by vine leaves and fruit, and on the right side is a sailing boat. To the right of it is the national emblem of the Slovak Republic. In the middle of the coin field is the nominal value of the coin, 10 EURO, below which is placed the country’s name SLOVENSKO and the year 2010. The stylized initials MR of the obverse designer, Miroslav Rónai, are located near the left rim of the coin. On the reverse of the coin is a portrait of Martin Kukučín. The left side depicts a young cuckoo, symbolizing the writer’s pen name. Below the portrait is a facsimile signature, Dr. Matej Bencúr. Close to the right rim of the coin is the name and surname MARTIN KUKUČÍN and to the left of the portrait are the dates of his birth and death: 1860 – 1928. Below the facsimile signature is located the mark of Kremnica Mint MK between two dies, and on its right are the stylized initials of the designer of the reverse, Mgr. art. Peter Valach PV.
Protection of Nature and Landscape - National Park Poloniny			
Author: Karol Ličko / Engraver: Dalibor Schmidt		Mint: Kremnica Mint	
Value: €20	Alloy: Ag 925, Cu 75	Quantity: 10 350 Proof, 8 150 BU	Quality: Proof and BU
Issued: 29 September 2010	Diameter: 40 mm (1.57 in)	Weight: 33.63 g (1.19 oz; 1.08 ozt)	Issue value: €36 Proof, €31.26 BU
Edge inscription: "OCHRANA PRÍRODY A KRAJINY" (protection of nature and landscape). The upper half of the obverse depicts part of the characteristic landscape motif of Poloniny National Park with Purple hellebore underneath. The inscription near the upper rim of the coin reads SLOVENSKO, the name of the country. The lower part shows the national emblem of the Slovak Republic with the year 2010 to its left. The reverse of the coin depicts two Gray wolves with a part of fallen tree. The inscription near the upper rim reads NÁRODNÝ PARK (National Park). The inscription near the lover rim reads POLONINY. The right upper part of the coin shows its nominal value 20 EURO. The mark of the Kremnica Mint MK between two dies, and the stylized initials of the author of the coin’s design – Karol Ličko – are placed near the right rim of the coin.
