= LGBTQ rights in Slovakia =

- Location of Slovakia (dark green) – in Europe (light green & dark grey) – in the European Union (light green) – [Legend]
- Legal status: Legal since 1962 as part of Czechoslovakia, age of consent equalized in 1990
- Gender identity: Not recognised since 2025
- Military: Allowed to serve openly
- Discrimination protections: Sexual orientation and gender identity protections since 2002 (see below)

Family rights
- Recognition of relationships: No recognition of same-sex couples
- Restrictions: Same-sex marriage constitutionally banned
- Adoption: Only married couples may adopt as of 2025, making it impossible for same-sex couples to adopt

Lesbian, gay, bisexual, transgender and queer (LGBTQ) people in Slovakia face significant challenges not experienced by non-LGBTQ residents. The status of LGBTQ rights in Slovakia are regarded as some of the worst among the European Union countries.

Same-sex sexual activity was made legal in Czechoslovakia in 1962. Despite this, same-sex couples are granted limited legal rights. The country does not recognize same-sex marriage or civil unions. Slovakia is generally seen as having less supportive public opinion for LGBTQ people compared to its neighbour, the Czech Republic.

On 12 October 2022, two people were killed (plus the perpetrator), and a third person was wounded in a shooting outside of the front entrance of Tepláren, a gay bar in Bratislava, Slovakia, a well-known spot frequented by the local LGBTQ community.

Opinion polls have shown highly fluctuating trends in support for same-sex marriage and civil unions. In 2019, polls showed either 29% or 57% of Slovaks support civil unions. A poll after the 2022 Bratislava terrorist attack showed only 40% support civil unions. Several civil union bills were proposed in 1997, 2000, 2012, 2018, 2021 and 2022, but all were rejected by the Slovak parliament.

Transgender people in Slovakia experience difficulty in accessing healthcare, and a complete lack of regulation in legal gender change makes the process highly individual and difficult.

On 3 July 2024, the Minister of Culture Martina Šimkovičová made a homophobic and racist statement saying “we heterosexuals are creating the future, because we make babies. Europe is dying out, babies are not being born because of the excessive number of LGBT people. And the strange thing is [that it’s happening] with the white race”.

== History ==
Same-sex sexual activity was legalized in 1962, when Slovakia was part of Czechoslovakia, after scientific research from Kurt Freund led to changes in public opinion (see history of penile plethysmographs).

In 1990, still as part of Czechoslovakia, the age of consent was equalized to 15, as it had previously been 18 for same-sex activity, different to heterosexual activity.

== Recognition of same-sex relationships ==
=== Unregistered cohabitation ===
Since 1964, Slovak law recognizes a close person, defined as a sibling or a spouse. A family member or a person in a relationship shall be considered under law a close person if an injury suffered by one of them is "reasonably felt by the other person as an injury suffered by him or her." Limited rights are granted, namely in the area of inheritance.

=== Civil unions ===
There is no legal recognition of civil unions in Slovakia. Several bills for the creation of civil unions were introduced in 1997, 2000, 2012, 2018, 2021 and 2022, but all were rejected by the Slovak parliament.

In 2008 and 2009, the LGBT rights group Iniciatíva Inakosť (Otherness Initiative) launched a public awareness campaign for the recognition of registered life partnerships (Slovak: životné partnerstvo) between same-sex couples. In January 2008, LGBT rights activists met with the Deputy Prime Minister, Dušan Čaplovič, to discuss this proposal. Throughout 2008, Iniciatíva Inakosť also held a number of public discussions about registered partnerships. The Slovak Green Party supports registered partnerships for same-sex and opposite-sex couples. In March 2012, the liberal Freedom and Solidarity (SaS) party announced that it would submit a draft law on registered partnerships. On 23 August, the registered partnership bill was submitted to Parliament, which would have given same-sex couples similar rights and obligations as married couples, including alimony, inheritance, access to medical documentation and the right to a widow's/widower's pension, but excluding adoption rights. On 19 September, the ruling party, Direction - Social Democracy (Smer) announced that it would vote against the bill, which was then rejected by 94 lawmakers, with only 14 in support.

In August 2017, Deputy Speaker of the National Council Lucia Ďuriš Nicholsonová of SaS promised to re-submit draft legislation on registered partnerships to Parliament. On 11 December 2017, following a meeting with Iniciatíva Inakosť representatives, President Andrej Kiska called for a public debate about the rights of same-sex couples. On the same day, SaS reiterated its intention to introduce a registered partnership bill. SaS introduced its registered partnership bill to the National Council in July 2018. Under the proposed bill, partnerships would have been open to both same-sex and opposite-sex couples and would have granted couples several rights and benefits enjoyed by married couples, namely in the area of inheritance and healthcare, among others. The bill was rejected in September 2018, with only 31 out of 150 lawmakers in support.

In 2021, the Progressive Slovakia party introduced another civil union bill. It was rejected with 7 lawmakers in support and 67 against.

=== Same-sex marriage ===
In January 2014, the Christian Democratic Movement (KDH) announced that it would submit a draft law to prohibit same-sex marriage in the Slovak Constitution. In February 2014, Minister of Culture Marek Maďarič said there were enough SMER-SD MPs in favour of the constitutional ban for it to pass. 40 opposition MPs introduced a draft law to the National Council to ban same-sex marriage in the Slovak Constitution. Prime Minister Robert Fico stated that the governing SMER-SD would be willing to support the amendment in exchange for the opposition's support for an amendment introducing changes in the judicial system. The bill passed its first reading in a 103–5 vote in March 2014. The amendment could cause any future laws recognising same-sex couples to be unconstitutional. In June 2014, it was passed and signed into law by President Ivan Gašparovič, with 102 MPs voting for and 18 against. Article 41 reads as follows:

Marriage is a unique union between a man and a woman. The Slovak Republic protects marriage in all of its aspects and supports its welfare. Marriage, parenthood and family are under the protection of the law. Special protection of children and juveniles is guaranteed. (Note: In Slovak: Manželstvo je jedinečný zväzok medzi mužom a ženou. Slovenská republika manželstvo všestranne chráni a napomáha jeho dobru. Manželstvo, rodičovstvo a rodina sú pod ochranou zákona. Zaručuje sa osobitná ochrana detí a mladistvých.)

In December 2013, a conservative civil initiative group named Aliancia za rodinu (Alliance for the Family) announced that it would demand a constitutional definition of marriage as "a union solely between a man and a woman". The Alliance intended to initiate referendums on several issues, and demanded a ban on same-sex adoption and the prohibition of sex education in schools. They also demanded that other types of cohabitation should never be held equal to a marriage between a man and a woman. Activists from the Alliance also criticised Swedish company IKEA for its corporate magazine, which featured two lesbians raising a son.

In August 2014, Aliancia za rodinu collected more than 400,000 signatures for a petition to hold a referendum on four questions:

1. Do you agree that no other cohabitation of persons other than a bond between one man and one woman can be called marriage?
2. Do you agree that same-sex couples or groups shouldn't be allowed to adopt children and subsequently raise them?
3. Do you agree that no other cohabitation of persons other than marriage should be granted particular protection, rights and duties that the legislative norms as of 1 March 2014 only grant to marriage and to spouses (mainly acknowledgement, registration, or recording as a life community in front of a public authority, the possibility to adopt a child by the spouse of a parent)?
4. Do you agree that schools cannot require children to participate in education pertaining to sexual behaviour or euthanasia if their parents or the children themselves do not agree with the content of the education?

President Andrej Kiska asked the Constitutional Court to consider the proposed questions. In October 2014, the Constitutional Court ruled that the third question was unconstitutional.

A referendum on the other three questions was held on 7 February 2015. All three proposals were approved, but the referendum was declared invalid due to insufficient turnout (21.07%). The referendum required a 50% turnout to be valid. Opponents, including LGBT activists, advised voters to boycott the referendum.

On 5 June 2018, in Coman and Others v General Inspectorate for Immigration and Ministry of the Interior, the European Court of Justice ruled in favour of a Romanian-American same-sex couple who sought to have their marriage recognized in Romania, so that the American partner could reside in the country. The Court ruled that EU member states may choose whether or not to allow same-sex marriage, but they cannot obstruct the freedom of residence of an EU citizen and their spouse. Furthermore, the Court ruled that the term "spouse" is gender-neutral, and that it does not necessarily imply a person of the opposite sex. Same-sex couples resident in Slovakia who have married in member states that have legalized same-sex marriage, and where one partner is an EU citizen, enjoy full residency rights as a result of the ruling. The Slovak Interior Ministry quickly announced immediate compliance with the ruling. The European Court of Justice's landmark ruling was praised by the International Lesbian, Gay, Bisexual, Trans and Intersex Association (ILGA) and other human rights groups, while the Slovak Catholic Church condemned it.

Regarding the recognition of same-sex unions and the registration of marriages contracted abroad, the European Court of Human Rights has established in cases such as Andersen v. Poland (2025), concerning the refusal to register a same-sex marriage contracted abroad in the Polish civil status register, and Przybyszewska and Others v. Poland (2023) that member states have a positive obligation under Article 8 of the European Convention on Human Rights to provide a specific legal framework for the recognition and protection of same-sex couples, thereby ensuring respect for their private and family life.

In October 2026, Slovak same-sex couples, including former diplomats Ivan Novotný and Metod Špaček and radio presenter Marián Žáry Kukelka, sued the Slovak authorities for refusing to register their marriages contracted in Austria. While the Ministry of the Interior rejected the applications based on the constitutional definition of marriage as a union between a man and a woman, the applicants argued that a November 2025 Court of Justice of the European Union ruling requires member states to recognise same-sex marriages concluded legally in another EU country.

== Adoption and parenting ==
As of 2025 only married couples may adopt, making it impossible for same-sex couples or single people or people in any unmarried relationship of any gender to do so.

== Discrimination protections ==
The Anti-Discrimination Act (Slovak: Antidiskriminačný zákon) was adopted in 2004, to comply with the European Union's requirements on anti-discrimination law in its member states. The act, broadened in 2008, made it illegal to discriminate on the basis of sexual orientation and gender identity in a wide variety of areas, including employment, education, housing, social care and the provision of goods and services. Article 2 of the law reads as follows:

Adherence to the principle of equal treatment shall lay in the prohibition of discrimination on grounds of sex, religion or belief, race, nationality or ethnic origin, disability, age, sexual orientation, marital or family status, colour, language, political affiliation or other conviction, national or social origin, property, lineage or any other status or on grounds of reporting of crime or any other wrongdoing.

In May 2013, the Criminal Code was amended to include sexual orientation as a ground for hate crimes, allowing harsher penalties for crimes motivated by homophobia. Additionally, hate speech on the basis of sexual orientation was outlawed.

== Military service ==
LGBT people are allowed to serve openly in the Slovak Armed Forces. As the Anti-Discrimination Act prohibits discrimination on the basis of sexual orientation, it also applies to the military.

In 2005, Pravda reported that "the military has a very homophobic environment that is hostile and intolerant of any manifestations and indications of homosexuality."

== Transgender rights ==
By law, transgender people in Slovakia have been allowed to change legal gender since 1995 under unclear requirements. However by 2022, transgender people were experiencing increasing challenges in being able to change their legal gender, as registry offices refuse to process the change unless challenged in court.

Slovak law does not state any requirements to do so, but in practice, it is usually required to undergo surgical sterilization. There have been exceptional cases where change of legal gender was possible without castration. Because there is no recognition of same-sex marriage, any existing marriage will be invalidated.

=== Attempts at legal amendments ===
In 2021, far-right neo-fascist parties introduced two legal amendment that would ban change of legal gender in Slovakia. A legal amendment was introduced by People's Party Our Slovakia (ĽSNS) on 12 February 2021. A second legal amendment was introduced by the Republic Movement party on 23 September 2021. Both attempts were unsuccessful, with the majority of votes being absentee or abstaining.

On 6 April 2022, the Ministry of Health published standards of care for transgender people that also regulated medical transition and the conditions of granting the ability to change the legal gender by appointed experts, where an appointed expert is any doctor in the field of psychiatry or sexology with at least five years of professional experience, and the person requesting documentation necessary for the legal gender change must be either surgically castrated or undergo the real-life experience test in combination with hormone replacement therapy for at least a year, unless it is contraindicated.

However, after pressure by the Conference of Slovak Bishops and members of the National Council, including the then-premier Eduard Heger, the standards of care were revoked on 18 May 2022. As such, there are no valid standards for legal gender change in Slovakia. It was claimed the attempts of approving the standards of care had been blocked by members of the then-government Ordinary People party.

On 19 October 2022, the Supreme Court overturned a decision of the Regional Court of Banská Bystrica, which ruled that undergoing surgical sterilization is required in order to change the legal gender, and confirmed Slovak law does not specify any requirements in order to change legal gender.

As of November 18, 2022, because of lack of regulation and standards, healthcare providers in Slovakia are refusing to provide transgender care, which forces trans people living in Slovakia to seek healthcare abroad, and some civil registry offices are refusing to process any applications to change legal gender, citing lack of regulation and telling them to wait for approval of the new standards of care by the Ministry of Health, meaning change of legal gender is close to impossible to achieve.

On 13 January 2023, members of People's Party Our Slovakia (ĽSNS) introduced another legal amendment that would ban legal gender change, as well as outlaw medical transition with the punishment of a prison sentence of at least 4 years. The amendment failed, with the majority abstaining.

On 24 February 2023, members of the then-government Christian Union party introduced a legal amendment that would restrict legal gender change to those "whose sex was wrongly assigned at birth," which could only be proven by a karyotype test. On 21 March 2023, the amendment passed its first reading with 87 votes for.

On 3 March 2023, the once suspended standards of care for transgender people were once again signed into force and republished by the then-minister of health Vladimír Lengvarský immediately before resigning. However, the impact of the standards in regards to access to the care and acceptance by the civil registries remains to be seen. On 21 March 2023, in an interview for Denník N, the secretary of state Michal Palkovič said the new standards of care have "some implementation issues in terms of law."

The guidelines on transition allowed people who hadn't had gender-affirming surgery to change their gender on their legal documents. On November 21, 2023, Health Minister Zuzana Dolinková told the media that "the stability of the government coalition" was at stake, and that was why the guideline was being revoked.

== Blood donation ==
Gay and bisexual people are prohibited from donating blood if they have had unprotected sexual intercourse within one year.

== Living conditions ==
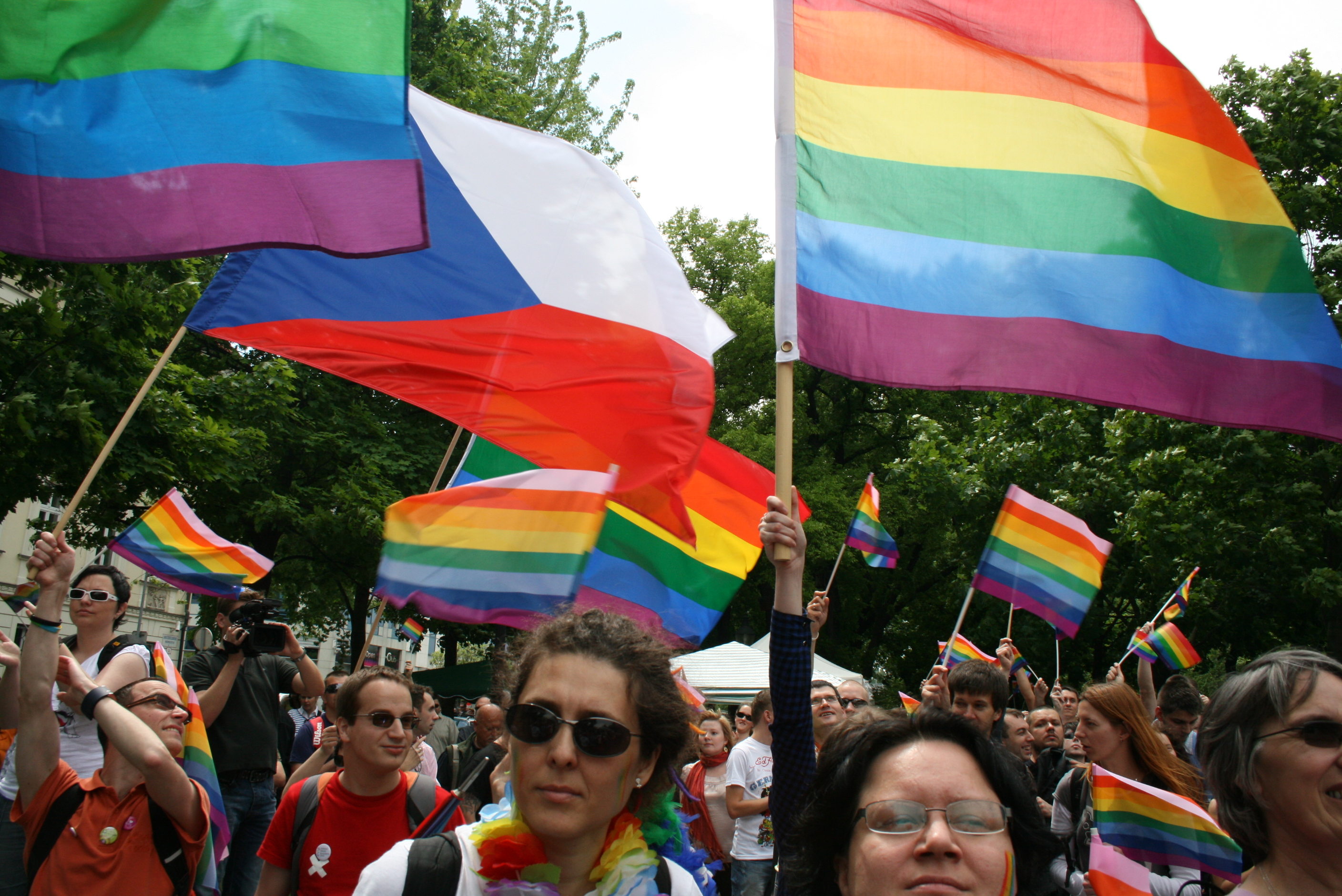
2010 Bratislava Pride

Slovakia's first gay pride event took place on 22 May 2010 in Bratislava. A crowd of about a thousand were confronted by anti-gay right-wing groups. While the National and Bratislava's municipal police forces kept the two sides apart, several anti-gay protesters were able to infiltrate the event and throw stones at speakers and disperse tear gas into the crowd. Pride demonstrators had to cancel their march through the city centre, but were able to cross the Danube under police protection. Twenty-nine people were arrested. The event has since improved its security measures and it has been supported by many foreign embassies. LGBT rights supports of some Slovak celebrities like actress Zdena Studenková, Zuzana Fialová, Petra Polnišová, gay actor Richard Stanke, singer Katarzia, and many more.

There is a small gay scene in Slovakia with a few bars and clubs in Bratislava.

== Public opinion and demographics ==
Support for the rights of same-sex couples	2008		2009		2012		2015		2016		2017		2019		2023	
Support for the rights of same-sex couples	YES [%]	NO [%]	YES [%]	NO [%]	YES [%]	NO [%]	YES [%]	NO [%]	YES [%]	NO [%]	YES [%]	NO [%]	YES [%]	NO [%]	YES [%]	NO [%]
"Same-sex registered partnership"	42	45	45	41	47	38	50	35	40	55	-	-	57	43	39.8	54.1
"Mutual maintenance duty among partners"	47	32	51	29	50	31	-	-	-	-	-	-	-	-	-	-
"Right for tax benefits"	41	43	43	39	45	38	-	-	-	-	-	-	-	-	-	-
"Right for spousal pension for deceased partner"	45	37	45	37	48	36	-	-	-	-	-	-	-	-	-	-
"Access to information about medical condition of partner"	64	21	72	16	75	15	-	-	-	-	-	-	-	-	-	-
"Right to day-off if partner requires accompaniment to doctor"	54	-	57	-	58	-	-	-	-	-	-	-	-	-	-	-
"Right to bereavement leave"	69	-	71	-	73	-	-	-	-	-	-	-	-	-	-	-
"Right to mutual inheritance"	58	-	56	-	60	-	-	-	-	-	-	-	-	-	-	-
"Possibility to establish undivided co-ownership"	55	-	56	-	57	-	-	-	-	-	-	-	-	-	-	-
"Right to nursing benefit during care for sick partner"	58	-	61	-	61	-	-	-	-	-	-	-	-	-	-	-
"Same-sex marriage"	-	-	-	-	-	-	24	69	27	69	47	47	20	70	37%	56%
"Adoption of children"	-	-	-	-	-	-	-	-	20	75	-	-	15	83	-	-

Public opinion has been fluctuating in Slovakia in the past few decades, initially becoming more favourable to granting rights to same-sex couples, then began stagnating by the end of the 2010s as a result of a coordinated homophobic campaign by conservative politicians. A 2007 Pew Global Attitudes Project survey recorded that 66% of Slovaks believed that homosexuality should be accepted by society. According to a poll conducted in 2009, 45% of respondents supported same-sex registered partnerships, 41% were opposed, and 14% were unsure. Support for specific rights was higher, with 56% supporting the right of same-sex couples to jointly own property, 72% to access medical information about their partner and 71% supporting the right to bereavement leave.

Support for same-sex marriage remains low compared to other European Union member states. A 2006 European Union poll showed that 19% of Slovaks supported same-sex marriage, and the 2015 Eurobarometer found that 24% of Slovaks supported same-sex marriage, the fourth lowest among EU member states alongside Lithuania. EU-wide support was 61%. However, a 2015 survey by AKO found that more than 50.4% of Slovaks would vote in favor of same-sex registered partnerships. A 2016 opinion poll conducted by FOCUS found that more than 27% of Slovaks supported same-sex marriage, an increase of 3% since 2015.

An LGBT social network called PlanetRomeo released its first Gay Happiness Index in May 2015. Gay men from more than 120 nations were surveyed to learn how they felt about society's perception of homosexuality, how they felt about how others treated them, and how content they were with their life. Slovakia was ranked 47th, far behind neighboring Czechia – 18th and Austria, 17th.

In 2017, Iniciatíva Inakosť conducted a survey enquiring into the lives of Slovak LGBT people. The survey found that 52% were irreligious, while 33% were Roman Catholics, 6% were Evangelicals and 2% were Greek Orthodox. 56.5% considered religion "important" in their lives. When divided by political ideology, 58.5% considered themselves either "very liberal" or "liberal". 2.5% considered themselves "conservative", and 18% said they were "centrist". Progressive Slovakia and Freedom and Solidarity were the most popular political parties among LGBT people. With regards to coming out, most respondents said it had been "positive". 71% and 52% of sisters and brothers respectively were accepting of their disclosure of lesbian, gay, and bisexual orientation. 54% of mothers, 42% of fathers and 49.5% of grandparents responded the same, and a significant number, including 28.5% of fathers and 29% of grandparents, were indifferent. Furthermore, 78% of respondents considered their relationship with their partner as "serious", and less than half were willing to hold their hand in public. Many respondents reported low self-esteem, anxiety, depression, alcohol abuse and suicidal feelings as a result of homophobic persecution, and nearly 40% of the respondents have experienced active discrimination because of their LGBT identity, with 15.2% of LGBT people experiencing it in the last year.

According to a 2017 Pew Research Center poll, 47% of Slovaks supported same-sex marriage, while another 47% were opposed and 6% were undecided. This was the highest level of support ever recorded, and the second highest among Eastern European countries, behind the Czech Republic at 65%. Among 18-34-year-olds, opposition to same-sex marriage was 42%. A 2019 survey conducted by the AKO polling agency found that 57% of Slovaks were in favour of registered partnerships for everyone, in contrast to a poll made by the FOCUS agency, which has found support for registered partnerships at 29%, a figure that was criticized by commentators and LGBT rights activists as an unusually low number, and they have questioned the strength and credibility of the poll's methodology. An AKO poll from August 2023 found support for same-sex registered partnership to be at 39.8%.

The 2023 Eurobarometer found that 37% of Slovaks people thought same-sex marriage should be allowed throughout Europe, while 56% disagreed. The 47% agreed that "there is nothing wrong in a sexual relationship between two persons of the same sex".

== Summary table ==
Same-sex sexual activity legal	Yes (Since 1962)
Equal age of consent (15)	Yes (Since 1990)
Anti-discrimination laws in employment	Yes (Since 2004)
Anti-discrimination laws in the provision of goods and services	Yes (Since 2008)
Anti-discrimination laws in all other areas (incl. indirect discrimination, hate speech)	Yes (Since 2016)
Hate crime laws include sexual orientation	Yes (Since 2013)
Same-sex marriage	No (constitutional ban since 2014)
Recognition of same-sex unions	No
Single LGBT individuals allowed to adopt	No (only heterosexual married couples can adopt, by constitutional amendment since 2025)
Stepchild adoption by same-sex couples	No
Joint adoption by same-sex couples	No
LGBT people allowed to serve openly in the military	Yes
Right to change legal gender	No (de facto since 2022 by law, by constitutional amendment since 2025)
Conversion therapy banned on minors	No
Access to IVF for lesbians	No
Commercial surrogacy for gay male couples	No (illegal for everyone by constitutional amendment since 2025)
MSMs allowed to donate blood	Yes / No (12 months deferral period)

== See also ==
- LGBT rights in Europe
- LGBT rights in the European Union
- 2022 Bratislava shooting
