= Coins of Slovakia =

Coins of Slovakia may refer to:

- Slovak euro coins
  - Euro gold and silver commemorative coins (Slovakia)
- Slovak koruna#Coins
- Slovak koruna (1939–1945)#Coins
