= Jozef Bíreš =

Slovak veterinary

Minister of Agriculture and Rural Development
- In office 15 May 2023 – 25 October 2023
- Prime Minister: Ľudovít Ódor
- Preceded by: Samuel Vlčan

Personal details
- Born: March 7, 1956 (age 70) Banská Bystrica, Czechoslovakia
- Party: Independent
- Education: University of Veterinary Medicine and Pharmacy in Košice
- Occupation: Veterinary

Jozef Bíreš (born 7 March 1956) is a Slovak veterinary and civil servant. From May to October 2023 he served as the Minister of Agriculture and Rural Development of Slovakia.

== Biography ==
Bíreš was born on 7 March 1956 in Banská Bystrica. He studied at the University of Veterinary Medicine and Pharmacy in Košice graduating in 1981. In 1987 he obtained his PhD. from the same university. Bíreš taught at the university from 1988 to 2003 and again from 2007 to 2010. From 2003 to 2007 he was the Director of the State Veterinary and Food Administration (ŠVPS SR) and from 2010 to 2023 its General Secretary.

On 15 May 2023, the president Zuzana Čaputová assigned Bíreš the Ministry of Agriculture and Rural Development in her technocratic government under the leadership of the Prime Minister Ľudovít Ódor.
