= Dunajské trstiny =

Nature reserve in Slovakia

Coordinates: 47.77171°N 17.85892°E

- IUCN category III (natural monument or feature)
- Interactive map of Dunajské trstiny
- Area: 1.041016 km²
- Established: 2002
- Governing body: ŠOP - S-CHKO Dunajské luhy

Dunajské trstiny is a nature reserve in the Slovak municipalities of Veľké Kosihy and Klížska Nemá in the Komárno District. The nature reserve covers an area of 104.1016 ha of the Danube floodplain area. It has a protection level of 4 under the Slovak nature protection system.

== Description ==
The area protects continuous reed communities. It presents a possibility to study the final stage of the silting process, houses wetland and hydrophile plant species and presents nesting places for wetland and reed birds.
