= Kremnica Mint =

Mint in Slovakia

Coordinates: 48°42′19.5″N 18°54′57.6″E

- Native name: Mincovňa Kremnica
- Industry: Metalworking
- Founded: 17 November 1328; 697 years ago
- Headquarters: Kremnica, Slovakia
- Area served: Kingdom of Hungary (1328–1918); Czechoslovakia (1921–1993); Slovakia (since 1993)
- Products: coins, medals, badges

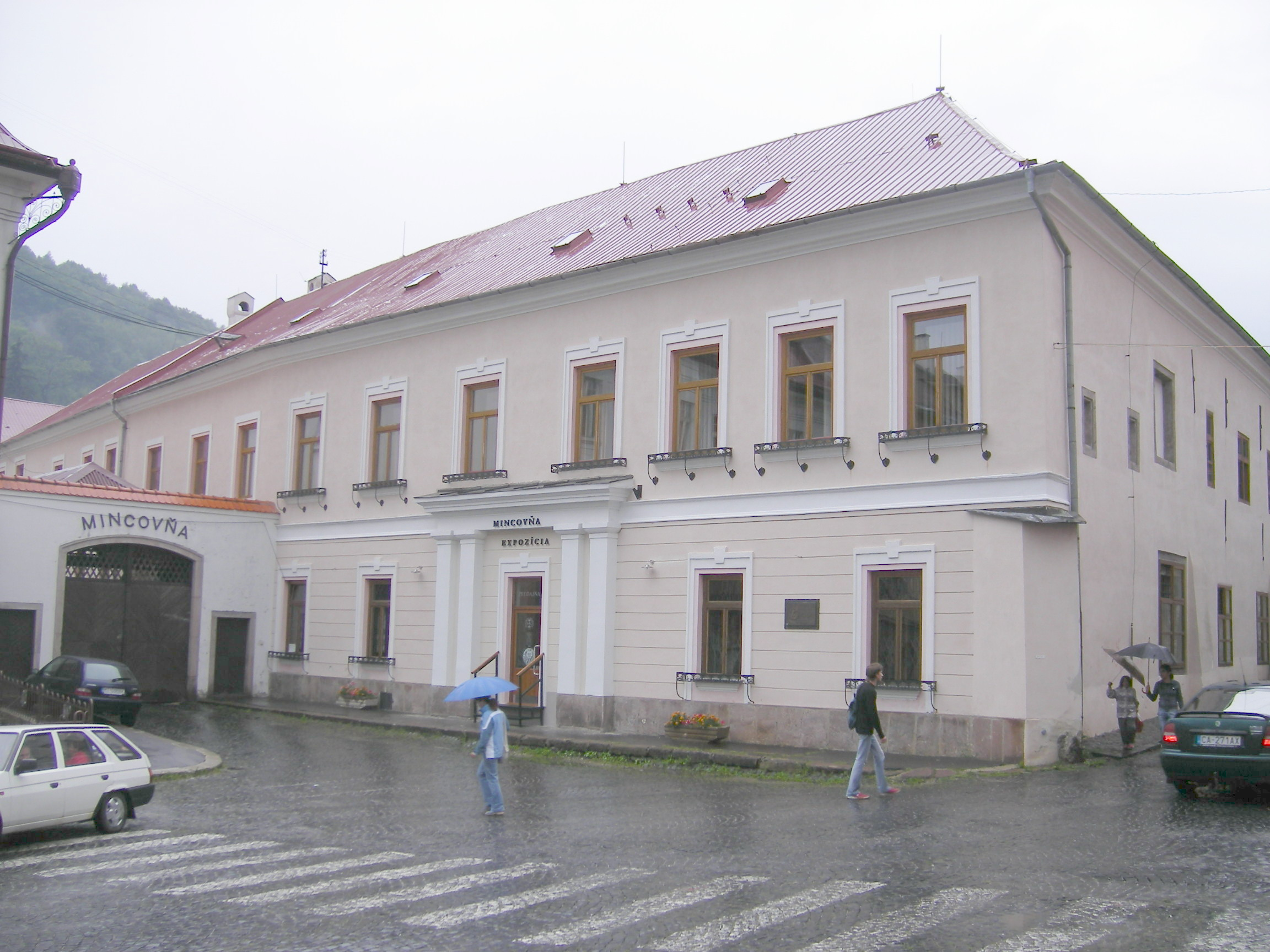
Main building

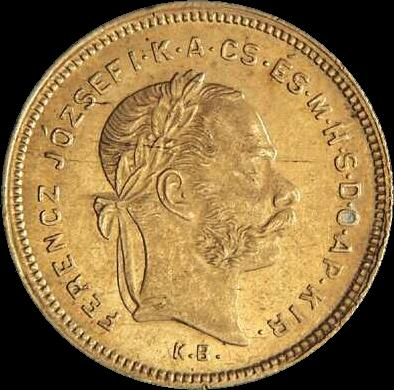
The last ducat minted in Kremnica for circulation (obverse, 1881).

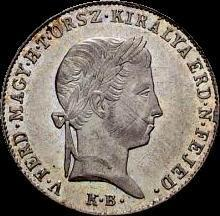
10 krajczár minted during the revolution (obverse, 1848).

The Kremnica Mint (Slovak: Mincovňa Kremnica, Hungarian: Körmöcbányai pénzverde) is one of the oldest mints in the world. It was established in 1328 by the King Charles Robert of Anjou, situated in Kremnica, Slovakia.

== History ==
Kremnica Mint was established in 1328 when Kremnica (Hungarian: Körmöcbánya) was promoted to a free royal town by the Hungarian King Charles Robert of Anjou; the mint issued several kinds of coins early on, of which the most successful was its ducat. Kremnica ducats were well known because of their good quality and were considered the hardest currency in Central Europe. Available historical records report that 21.5 million ducats were minted at the Kremnica Mint throughout its history. The aggregate value of this amount, measured at today's prices of gold, would be three billion US dollars (exclusive of the numismatic value).

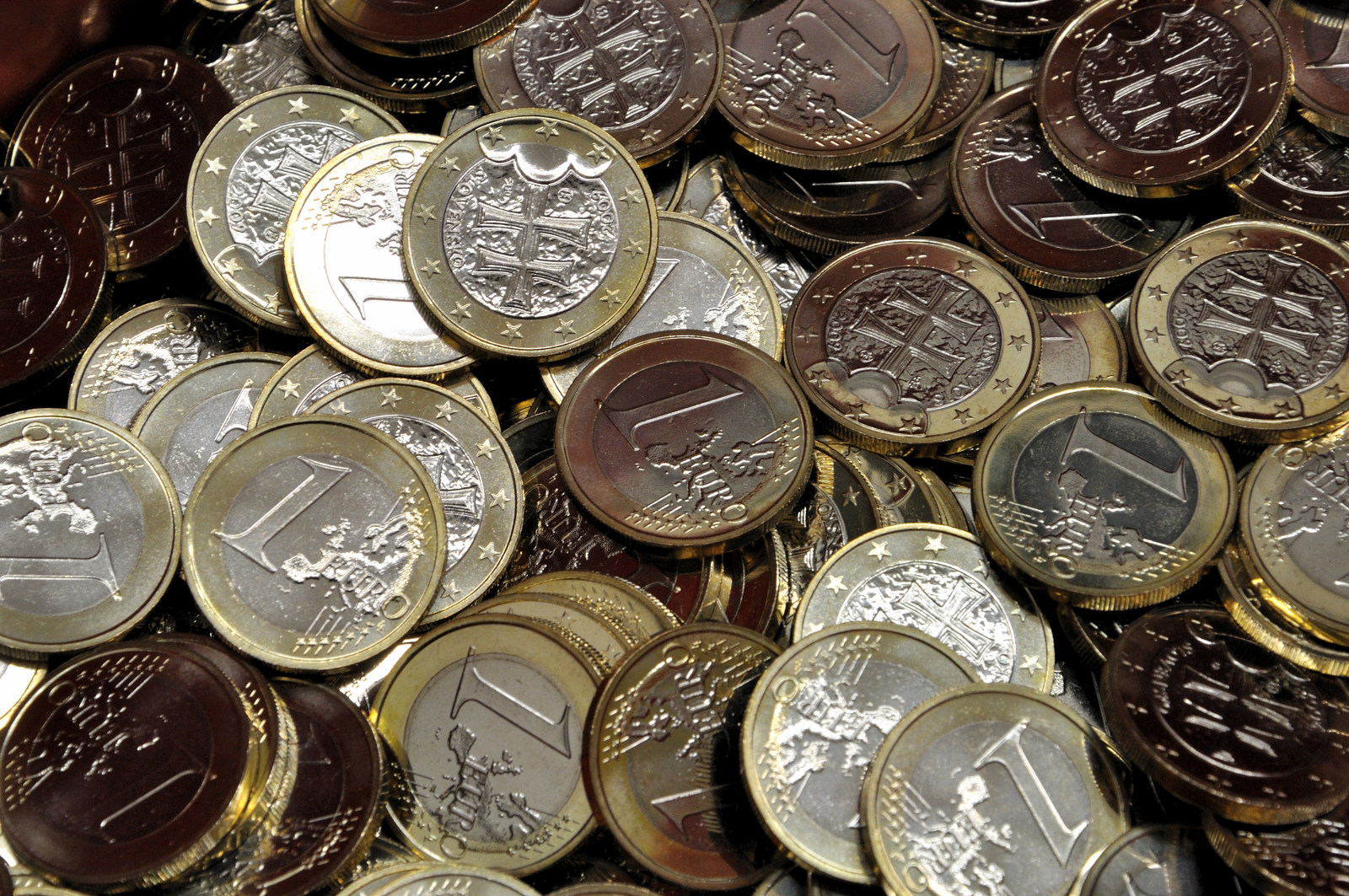
Euro coins

The mint became very outdated by the beginning of the 20th century, and many called for new equipment and for the mint to be moved to Budapest. However, this did not happen until the end of World War I. As the Czecho-Slovak troops invaded Northern Hungary (current day Slovakia), the Károlyi government ordered to move the equipment and noble metal stock to Budapest. The Hungarian Government started to mint the first coins with the faulty machines and worn-out dies in Csepel. Even coins minted in 1922 bore the KB mint mark.

The Czecho-Slovak government had to set up a new mint as well, since not more than the buildings were left in Kremnica. Work on the new machinery started in 1921. Since then, the Kremnica Mint has manufactured all the coins used by the Czecho-Slovak and Slovak state and minted coins for 25 other countries. Since Kremnica was the site of the sole mint of the Czecho-Slovak state, the Czech protectorate (1939–1945) was supplied with coins by Germany, and the Czech Republic (since 1993) established its own mint.

== Today ==
Kremnica Mint manufactures both circulation coins and commemorative coins for the National Bank of Slovakia (Slovak euro coins), but the Mint's available capacities and quality standards make it capable of supplying coins to other countries worldwide.

In March 2013 the Mint won a contract to produce 175 million Sri Lankan 10 Rupee pieces with total value of the contract of US$6.032 billion. This contract is especially valuable for Kremnica Mint as it succeeded in the field previously dominated by the Royal Mint.

== Exposition ==
Kremnica Mint established its own coin shop in 2006. The shop is placed inside the reconstructed historical building from 1450. An exposition of minting is part of the coin shop and it also includes a remaining set of a historical striking machines - Vulkan. In addition to historical striking machines, visitors could also observe coinage on modern striking machines.

== Mint marks ==
The first mint mark on coins minted in Kremnica was C (for Latin Cremnicium), this was changed to K (for Hungarian Körmöcz or German Kremnitz) under Sigismund and later K-B (Hungarian Körmöcz-Bánya or German Kremnitz-Bergstadt). With a decree from 16 June 1766, Maria Theresa uniformized the mint marks of the Austrian Empire, the new alphabetical system showed the importance of the mint: Körmöcbánya received letter B (Vienna mint received A, Prague mint C, etc.). This was changed back to K.B. (for Körmöczbánya) temporarily in 1848-49 and finally in 1868. The K.B. mint mark was used after evacuation of the mint to Budapest until 1922. The Mincovňa Kremnica uses its initials (MK) as mint mark.

== See also ==
- List of oldest companies
