= Marek Krajčí =

Slovak politician (born 1974)

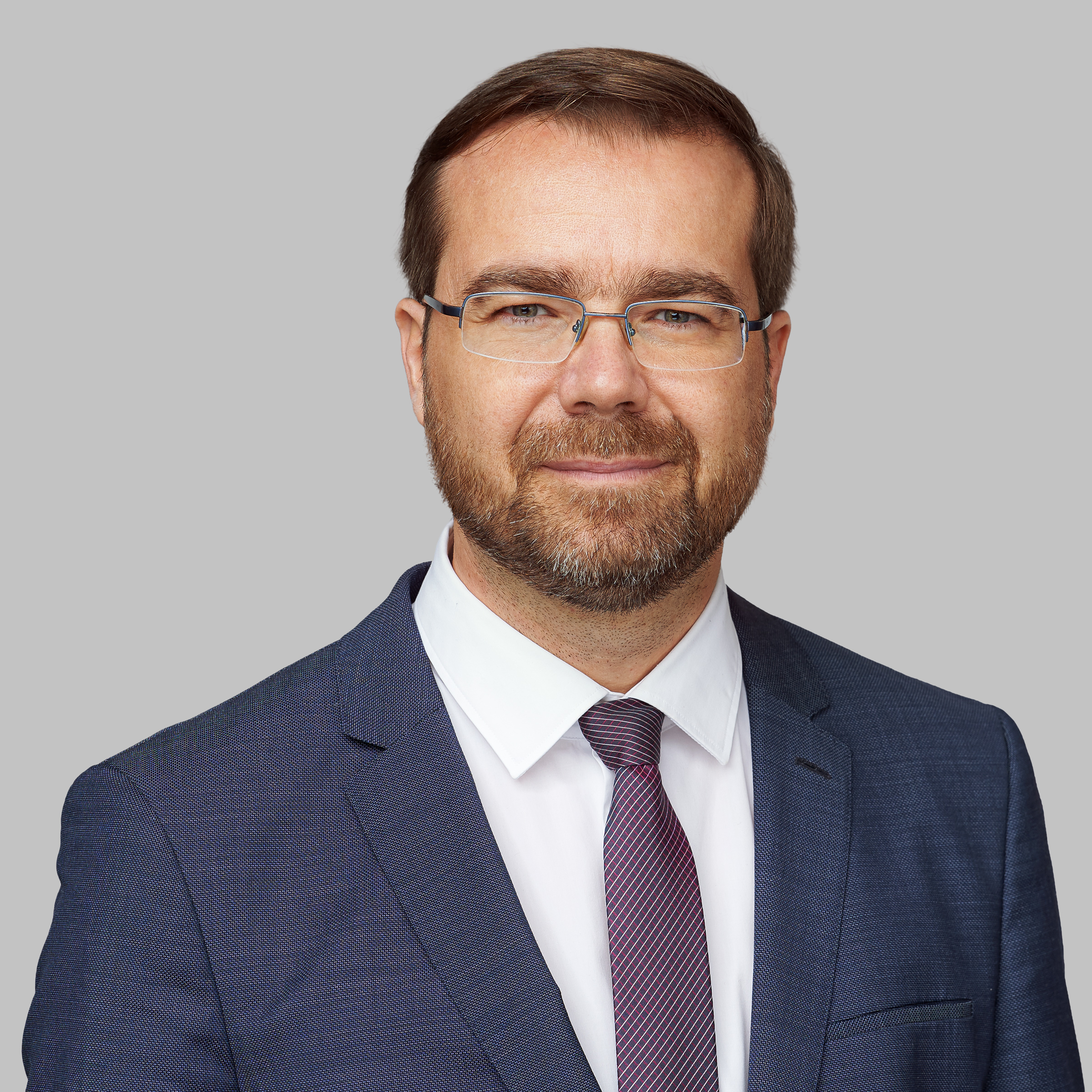
- President: Zuzana Čaputová
- Preceded by: Peter Pellegrini
- Succeeded by: Eduard Heger (acting); Vladimír Lengvarský

Member of the National Council of the Slovak Republic
- Incumbent
- Assumed office 16 March 2021
- In office 23 March 2016 – 21 March 2020

Minister of Health
- In office 21 March 2020 – 12 March 2021

Personal details
- Born: 24 March 1974 (age 52) Bratislava, Czechoslovakia (now Slovakia)
- Party: Slovakia
- Spouse: Kamila Krajčíová
- Children: 6

Marek Krajčí (born 24 March 1974) is a Slovak politician, member of the National Council and a member of the parliamentary caucus of the political party Slovakia (Hnutie Slovensko).

Krajčí served as deputy in the National Council from 2016 to 2020 as Ordinary People and Independent Personalities (OĽaNO) candidate. From 21 March 2020 to 12 March 2021, he served as the Minister of Health. Amidst pressure from the public and political parties on 11 March 2021, he announced his resignation as Minister of Health. After his resignation, he resumed his seat in the parliament.

He is the founder and chairman of the board of the Christians in the City platform.

== Political career ==
=== 2016 and 2020 Slovak parliamentary elections ===
Krajčí ran 2016 Slovak parliamentary election from fourth place as an independent OĽaNO candidate. He received 31,781 preferential votes and was elected as a member of the National Council of the Slovak Republic.

During the 2020 Slovak parliamentary election, Krajčí received 143rd place on OĽANO candidate list. He received 35,515 preferential votes and was elected. On 21 October 2020, Krajčí served as Minister of Health of Slovakia in Matovič's Cabinet.

=== Minister of Health ===
In 2020, Krajčí managed to enforce a strict curfew and approve a COVID-19 machine. However, the situation did not improve for two months as expected.

During the COVID-19 pandemic, Krajčí deployed Peter Stachura to manage the reprofiling of the hospital bed pool. Krajčí made sure affordable health care for people with COVID-19 by gradually sending the hospital bed pool and managing patient transfers.

Together with Igor Matovič, Krajčí secured the Russian Sputnik V vaccine for Slovakia, which they welcomed together at Košice Airport on 1 March 2020. This escalated long-standing tensions between the main representatives of the coalition and finally led to the outbreak of a government crisis.

== Personal life ==
Krajčí worked for over 20 years as a pediatric cardiologist. He is married with his wife Kamila, with whom he fathered 6 children. They reside in his native Bratislava.

Krajčí is a Baptist. He also served as a lay minister in Slovak congregations. He is an author of various Christian music, including three albums of praise and worship and one children's album. He was also the editor-in-chief of the magazine Step of Christians in Society.

=== Christians in The City ===
Krajčí is the founder of the Christians in the City platform, which connects Christian communities and various non-governmental organizations in Bratislava. Among the platform’s best-known projects is its I Love My City festival, during which hundreds of volunteers help people in need, support social care facilities and in cooperation with city districts, clean and revitalize public spaces, parks, and forests.

== Fake Election Observer ==
Krajčí participated as an international observer in the local and regional elections in Russia in September 2017 and in the presidential elections in March 2018. These were not official missions of Organization for Security and Co-operation in Europe (OCSE). Krajčí was presented by Russian media as a Member of the National Council of the Slovak Republic (Slovak Parliament).

Stephanie Schiffer, President of Berlin-based European Platform for Democratic Elections (EPDE), stated in a letter addressed to the speaker of Slovak parliament in connection with the 2018 mission that Krajčí "deliberately contradicted the conclusions of the observation mission of the OSCE" and sought "to misinform the Russian public about the true nature of international public opinion on the electoral process."

The Office of the National Council replied that no department had been informed about this mission and that “the National Council of the Slovak Republic, nor its Office, in no way organised or financed this trip,” and therefore “the trip must be viewed exclusively as a private trip by Mr. Marek Krajčí.”

The missions were allegedly financed by the Russian side. These conclusions were also confirmed by Krajčí himself, who stated in his position: "I took part in them as an independent international observer. Not within the framework of the OSCE, but as a private person at the invitation of the Russian State Duma. The trip was financed by the Russian Peace Foundation, with which I have never had, and do not have, any ties or contacts."

The circumstances, participants, and course of both missions are described in detail in a November 2021 report by the EPDE.

Both observer missions were organized by Janusz Niedźwiecki, a Polish citizen and founder of the European Council on Democracy and Human Rights (ECDHR), who was arrested in Poland on 31 May 2021 and charged with espionage on behalf of the Russian intelligence services. His arrest and the charges were part of a broader investigation by the Polish Internal Security Agency (Agencja Bezpieczeństwa Wewnętrznego, ABW).

Investigative reporting by T-Online revealed that Niedźwiecki was part of an influence network in Europe linked to sanctioned Ukrainian oligarch Viktor Medvedchuk, who has close ties to Vladimir Putin. Niedźwiecki was also closely connected to the pro-Russian milieu in Poland, particularly through his involvement in the extra-parliamentary party Zmiana of Mateusz Piskorski, who was arrested in May 2016 for spying for Russia.

According to T-Online’s investigation, Krajčí also participated with Niedźwiecki in monitoring the 2018 presidential elections of the Azerbaijani regime of President Ilham Aliyev.

Marek Krajčí was included in the international database of fake election observers of the EPDE.
