= 2015 Slovak same-sex marriage referendum =

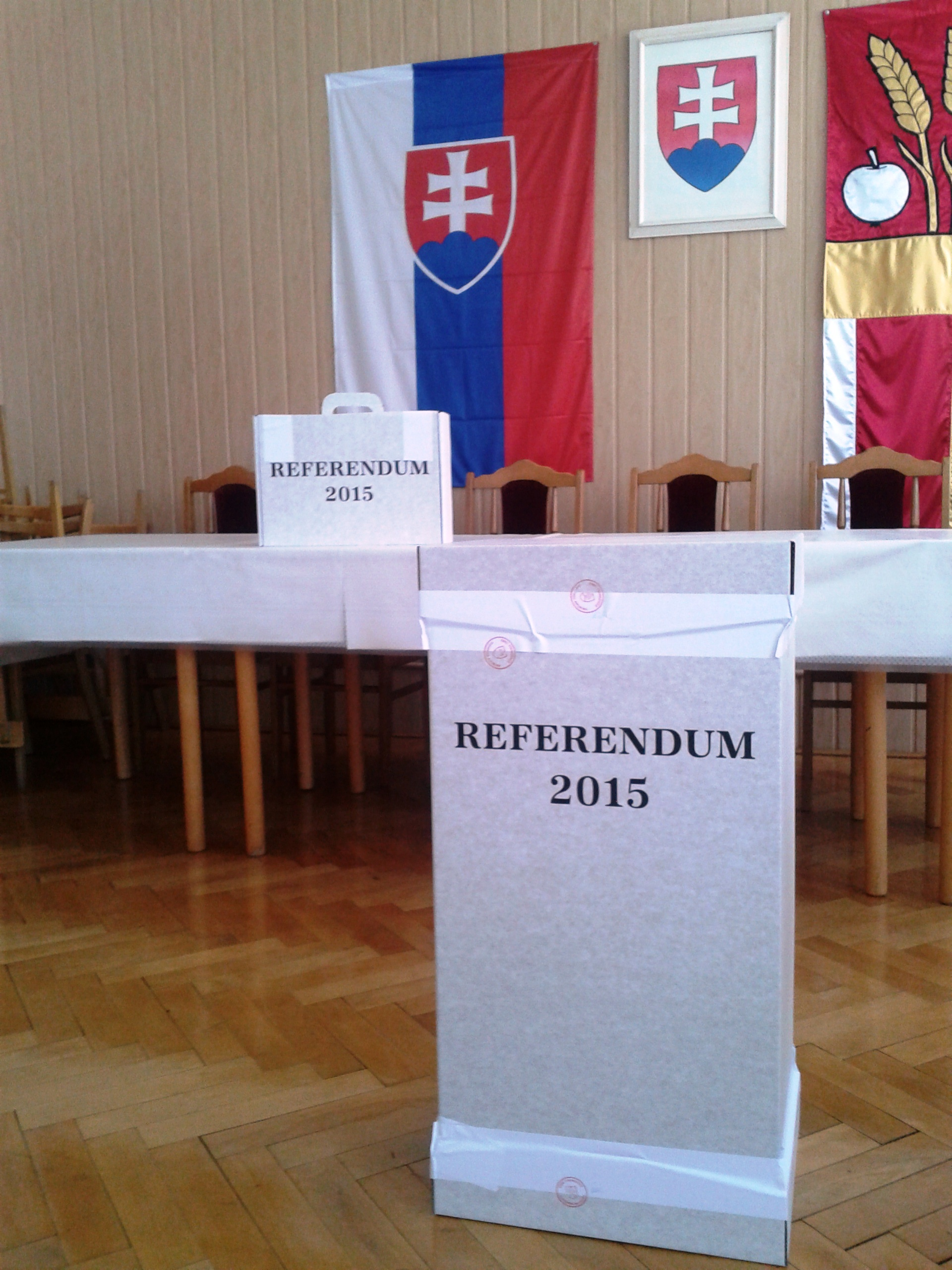
Ballot box and portable ballot box (on the table) used in referendum in Slovakia, 2015

A referendum on banning same-sex marriage was held in Slovakia on 7 February 2015. Critics claimed the referendum was pushed by religious and conservative organisations, aiming to block gay couples from gaining more rights.

The referendum was not valid as the turnout did not reach the required threshold of 50%, with only 21.4% of citizens casting a vote.

== Background ==
In June 2014, the Slovakia National Council amended the country's constitution to specifically deny same-sex couples the legal protections associated with marriage.

The referendum was initiated after the conservative church backed group Alliance for Family gathered 400,000 signatures calling for a vote on the law. The Conference of Slovak Bishops, which organises anti-abortion and anti-euthanasia rallies overwhelmingly supported the move.

== Questions ==
Voters were asked questions on three issues:

- Do you agree that only a bond between one man and one woman can be called marriage?
- Do you agree that same-sex couples or groups should not be allowed to adopt and raise children?
- Do you agree that schools cannot require children to participate in education pertaining to sexual behaviour or euthanasia if the children or their parents don't agree?

A fourth question on registered partners was rejected by the Constitutional Court.

In order for the proposal to be approved, voter turnout needed to be at least 50%.

== Campaign ==
Supporters of the referendum campaigned predominantly in churches, with the Conference of Slovak Bishops raising funds for the campaign. 62% of Slovaks identify as Catholics, and although less than 40 percent of those attend mass regularly, Reuters describes Slovakia as "one of the most religious countries in Europe on the surface".

The vote, which cost more than €6.3 million to run, led to conservative groups spending around €110,000 on advertisements. The Christian conservative activism platform CitizenGo, run by Brian S. Brown, the American founder of the National Organization for Marriage, supported the referendum.

Slovakia's LGBTQ groups, which are smaller and less organised than their opponents, encouraged people not to vote at all, for fear that "no" voters might push turnout over 50%.

== Reactions ==
Former Slovak Prime Minister Iveta Radičová said that if the referendum passes, "It will not improve the standing of families and marriages; and there won’t be any more children, either." She criticised the referendum as being pushed by people who want to "want to cover up the real problems" in Slovakia, like "balancing of work responsibilities with childcare, unemployment," financial insecurity and domestic violence. Radičová described the movement as motivated by "the fear of the new, the unknown, and the other" and condemned opposition to sex education, pointing out that it is proven to reduce sexually transmitted diseases, unwanted pregnancies, and delay sexual experimentation.

The libertarian party Freedom and Solidarity criticised the referendum, as did the EU parliament's Socialists and Democrats.

Boris Dittrich criticised the involvement of American Evangelical donors like Alliance Defending Freedom in determining the social agenda in Eastern European democracies, when they had lost on same-sex marriage in America. Amnesty International has condemned the country's discrimination against LGBTQ people and the international media, including The Economist, critiqued the political process in the country. Gay rights groups criticised the referendum, saying "unemployment, social problems and alcoholism" would not be solved by a vote to ban gay marriages or adoptions. International critics criticised the ruling social democratic party for pandering to populist religious homophobia, and critiqued the ballot as a waste of millions of euros, and a distraction from Slovakia's economic woes, and "genuine problems of Slovak public policy."

Pope Francis supported the referendum, blessing the opponents of gay rights, stating “I greet the pilgrims from Slovakia and, through them, I wish to express my appreciation to the entire Slovak church, encouraging everyone to continue their efforts in defense of the family, the vital cell of society.”

A group of theologians issued a position paper claiming that the referendum is touching on ethical questions and those should be solved by discussion rather than by voting. The authors of the position Ondrej Prostredník, František Ábel and Igor Kišš, all from the Lutheran Theological Faculty of Comenius University in Bratislava also claimed that several times in history the way of shortcuts and authoritarian decisions in favor of Christian values proved to be bad and damaged the very cause of Christ's Gospel. They also criticized the referendum as an immoral attempt to shift the responsibility for the crisis of family values in the Slovak society to homosexuals. The position paper as joined by 48 theologians and intellectuals from different churches and sectors of the society.

Another EU nation, Croatia, banned same-sex marriages in a constitutional referendum on 1 December 2013. Turnout in Croatia was also less than 50%, but its constitution does not invalidate a referendum based on turnout.

== Opinion polls ==
A Eurobarometer poll on in 2006 found that 19% of Slovaks supported same-sex marriage and 81% opposed, while 12% supported and 84% opposed LGBTQ adoption. A European Social Survey in 2010 found that 42% of Slovaks believe that “gay men and lesbians should be free to live their own lives as they wish.”

Polls suggested that only 35% of the population intended to vote in the referendum, with 85% of respondents supporting the first motion banning same-sex marriage, 78% supporting a ban on LGBTQ adoption, and 70% supporting the third question on sex education. Opposition towards the referendum questions was higher amongst students, single people, those under 35, supporters of the libertarian party Freedom and Solidarity, those with openly gay family members or colleagues, people who live in more progressive town environments, and atheists and people with weaker religious beliefs.

== Results ==
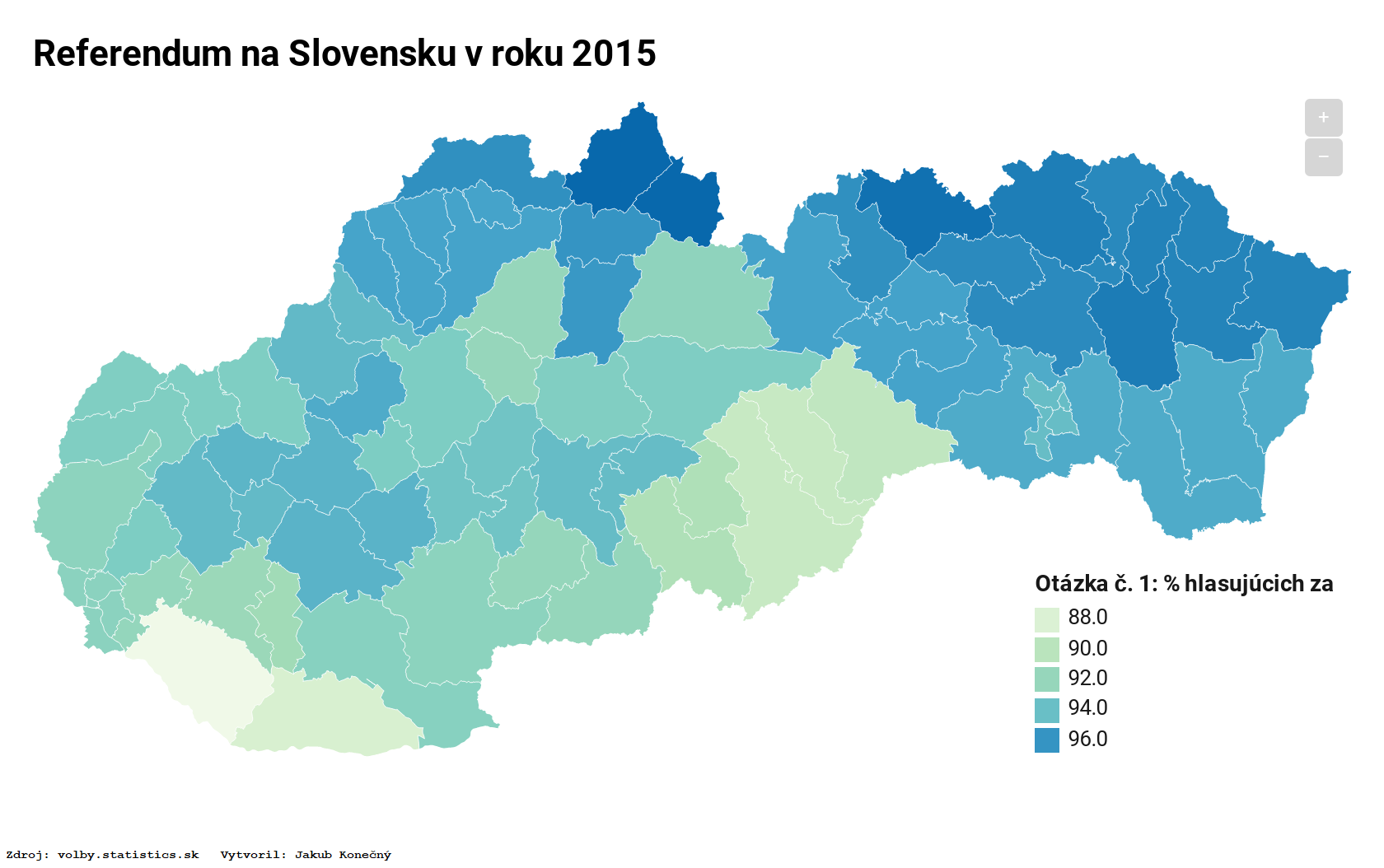
The percentage of voters voting in favour of the question no.1 in districts of Slovakia

The referendum was deemed invalid due to low turnout, with just 21.4% of eligible voters casting votes, far short of the 50% required for the results to be legally binding.

Question	For		Against		Invalid/ blank	Total	Registered voters	Turnout
Question	Votes	%	Votes	%	Invalid/ blank	Total	Registered voters	Turnout
Question 1 – marriage ban	892,719	94.50	39,088	4.13	12,867	944,674	4,411,529	21.41%
Question 2 – adoption ban	873,224	92.43	52,389	5.54	19,061	944,674	4,411,529	21.41%
Question 3 – sex education choice	853,241	90.32	69,349	7.34	22,084	944,674	4,411,529	21.41%
Source: Statistical Office of the Slovak Republic

== See also ==
- Recognition of same-sex unions in Slovakia
- LGBT rights in Slovakia
