= Pavol Lančarič =

Slovak manager

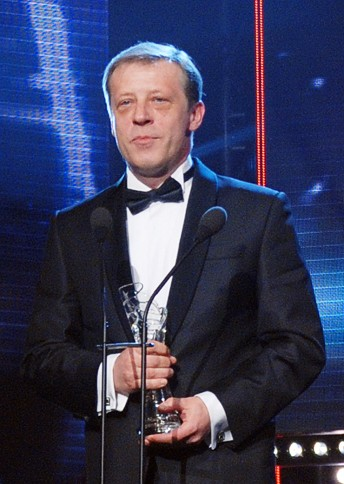

Minister of Transport
- In office 15 May 2023 – 25 October 2023
- Prime Minister: Ľudovít Ódor
- Preceded by: Andrej Doležal
- Succeeded by: Jozef Ráž

Personal details
- Born: 31 May 1963 (age 62) Bojnice, Czechoslovakia

Pavol Lančarič (born 31 May 1963) is a Slovak Manager, who was the CEO of Orange Slovensko for 20 years. From May to October 2023, he served as the Minister of Transportation of Slovakia.

Lančarič was born on 31 May 1963 in Bojnice. He studied commerce at the University of Economics in Bratislava, graduating in 1985. He obtained a PhD from the same university in 1991. Following his graduation he worked for the Deloitte, Tchibo and Rheinische Post. He spent most of his career at the Slovak branch of the global mobile network Orange, which he led as its CEO from 1999 to 2019. He was named the Manager of the Year by the economic monthly Trend in 2010. In May 2019 he was replaced as the CEO of Orange by the Spanish Manager Federico Colom.

On 15 May 2023, president Zuzana Čaputová installed Lančarič as Minister of Transportation in her technocratic government.
