= Church of Saint Nicolas of Ruská Bystrá =

Church of Saint-Nicolas of Ruská Bystrá
- Chrám Prenesenia ostatkov svätého Mikuláša
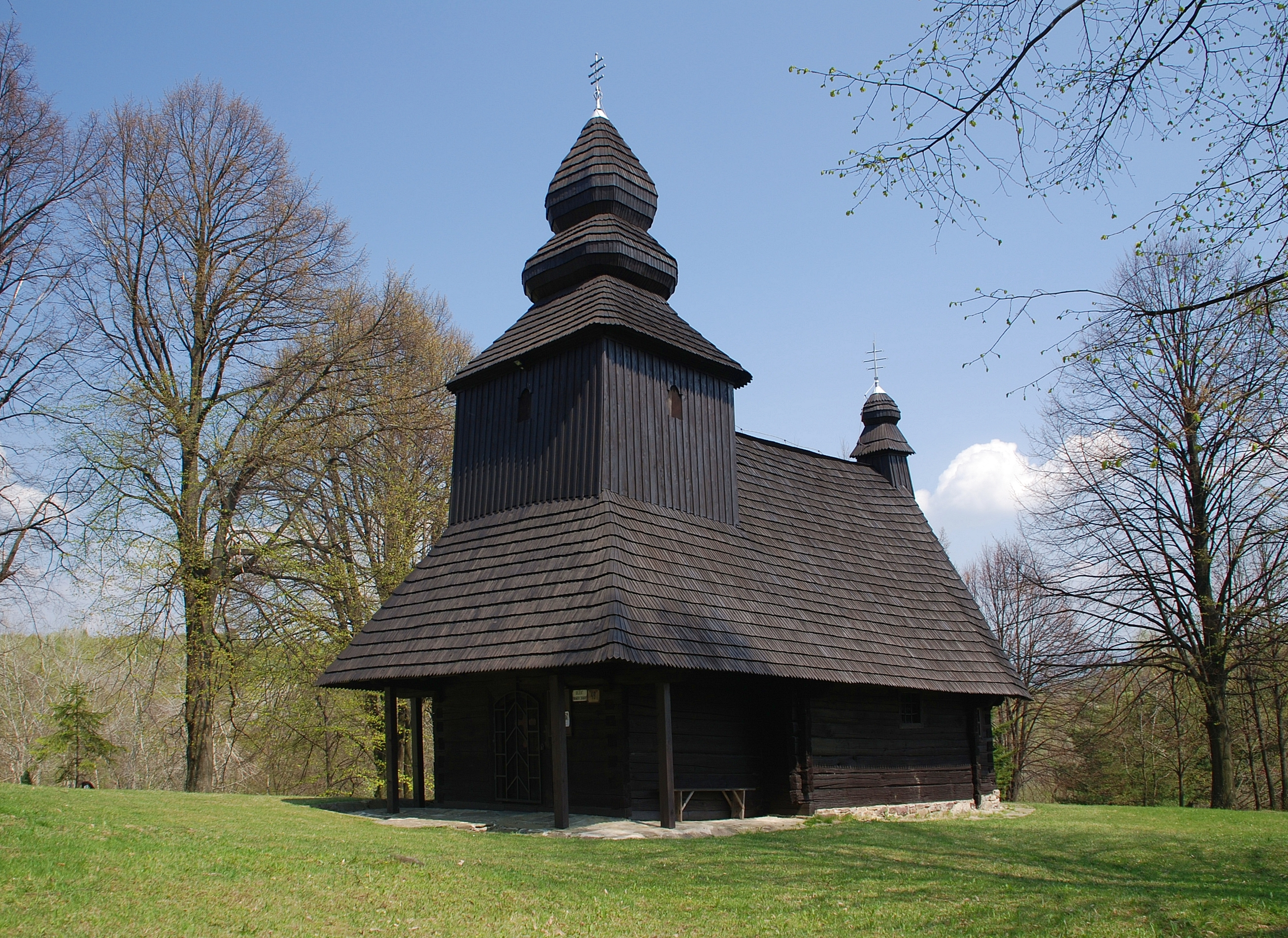
- Church of Saint-Nicolas of Ruská Bystrá

Religion
- Affiliation: Slovak Greek Catholic Church
- District: Sobrance
- Region: Košice
- Leadership: Slovak Catholic Eparchy of Košice
- Year consecrated: 1730

Location
- Location: Ruská Bystrá
- Country: Slovakia
- Interactive map of Church of Saint-Nicolas of Ruská Bystrá
- Coordinates: 48.856667°N 22.296667°E

Architecture
- Type: Church
- Church of Saint Nicolas of Ruská Bystrá

UNESCO World Heritage Site
- Part of: Wooden Churches of the Slovak part of the Carpathian Mountain Area
- Criteria: Cultural: (iii), (iv)
- Reference: 1273-009
- Inscription: 2008 (32nd Session)

Church of Saint-Nicolas of Ruská Bystrá is a Greek-catholic church situated in the village of Ruská Bystrá.

== History ==
The church was constructed in wood in 1730 by the parishioners. On July 7, 2008, the church along with seven other monuments was declared UNESCO world heritage site under the name "Wooden Churches of the Slovak part of the Carpathian Mountain Area".

The most dramatic feature is the five-row iconostasis that separates the sanctuary (Altar) from the nave. In the first row are icons depicting St Nicholas, the Mother of God, Christ the Teacher, and St Paraskieva.
