= Daniel Bútora =

Slovak educator

Daniel Butora
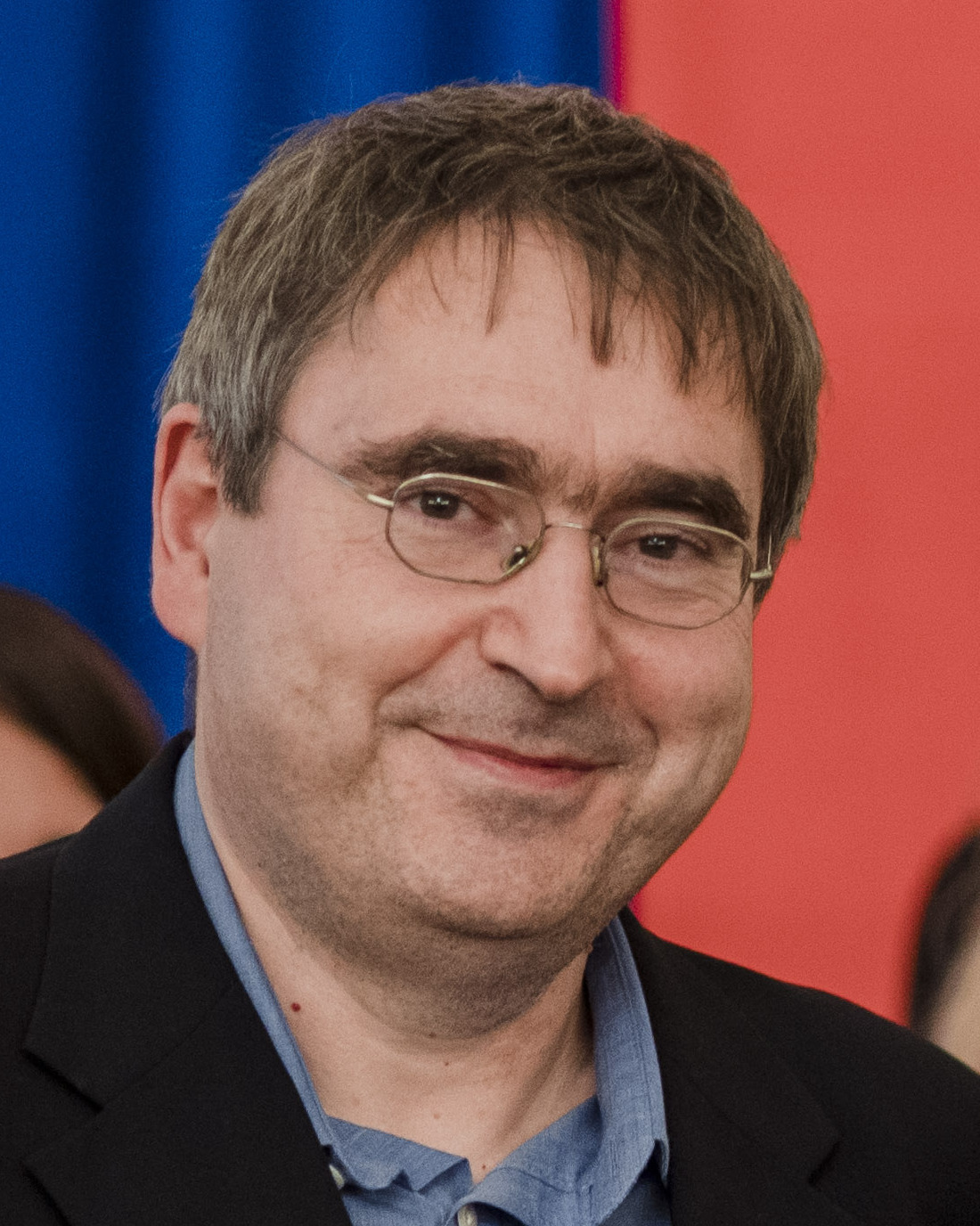
- Butora in 2019

Minister of Education
- In office 15 May 2023 – 25 October 2023
- Prime Minister: Ľudovít Ódor
- Preceded by: Ján Horecký
- Succeeded by: Tomáš Drucker

Personal details
- Born: 1967 (age 58–59) Bratislava, Czechoslovakia
- Party: Independent
- Children: 5
- Education: Charles University
- Occupation: Educator and journalist

Daniel Bútora (born in 1967) is a Slovak educator and journalist. From May to October 2023, he served as the Minister of Education of Slovakia.

== Biography ==
Bútora was born in 1967 in Bratislava. His father is the sociologist and diplomat Martin Bútora and his grandfather from his mother side was the poet Laco Novomeský. In the 1980 he started participating on the activities of the Underground church and eventually in the wider anti-communist dissent. Bútora enrolled to study Library and Information Science at the Comenius University but did not graduate due to his focus on political activism and journalism.

In 1992 he moved to Prague where he studied American studies at the Charles University, graduating in 1998. Following his graduation, he started working for the Prague branch of Radio Free Europe and lead English language training courses for journalists.

In 2004, Bútora returned to Bratislava, where he is in charge of the Church of the Brethren education activities, in particular establishment and management of a network of private elementary schools Narnia and the bilingual private C.S.Lewis High School. He was also one of the founders of the Teach for Slovakia movement, which facilitates sending qualified teachers to schools located in the socially marginalized communities. On 15 May 2023, the president Zuzana Čaputová assigned Bútora the Ministry of Education in her technocratic government under the leadership of the Prime Minister Ľudovít Ódor.

== Personal life ==
Bútora is a member of the Church of the Brethren. He is married and has five children.
