= University of Veterinary Medicine and Pharmacy in Košice =

University in Slovakia

Coordinates: 48°44′20″N 21°14′46″E

- Univerzita veterinárskeho lekárstva a farmácie v Košiciach
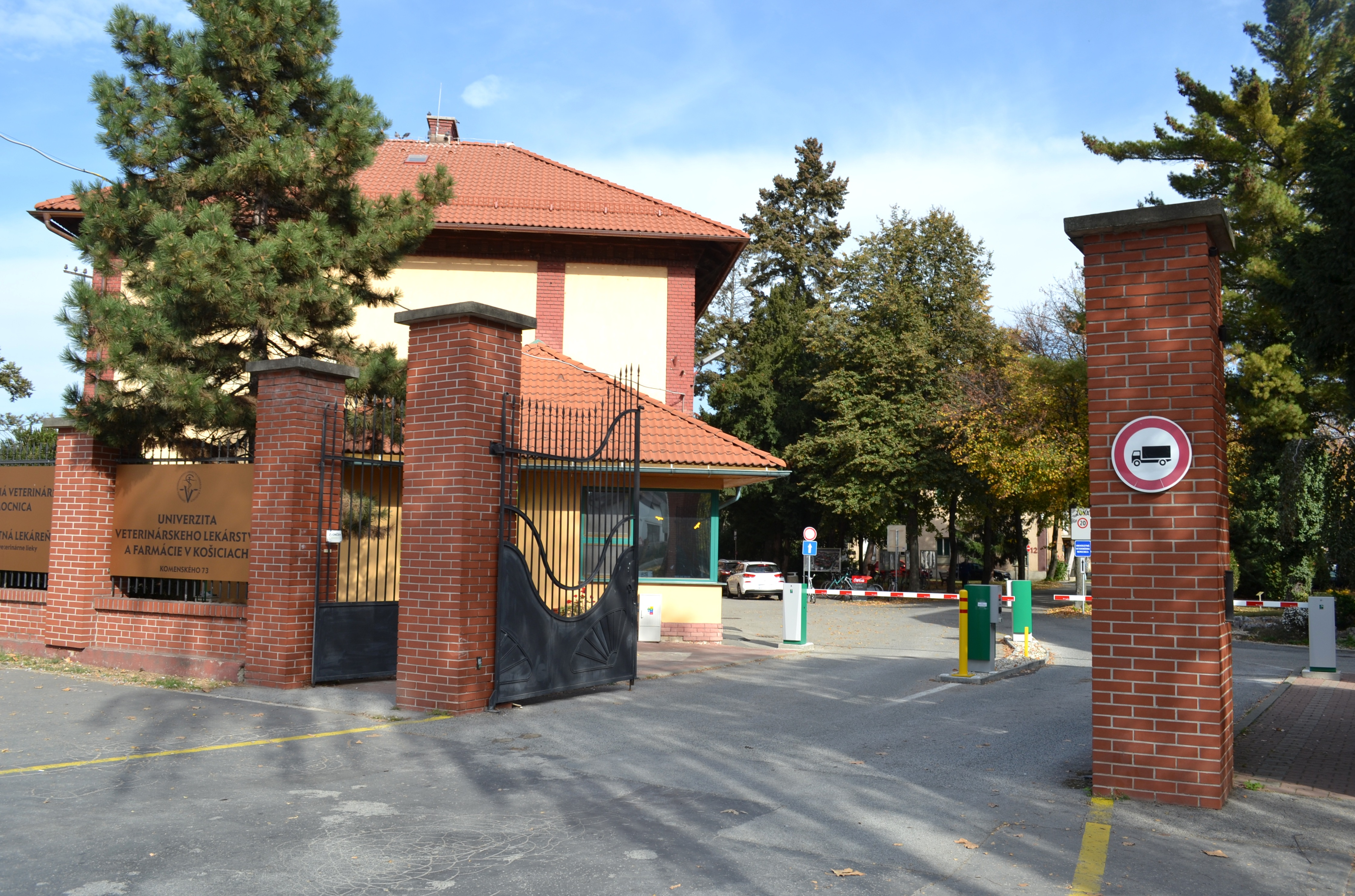
- Entrance to the university campus
- Established: 1949
- Website: uvlf.sk

The University of Veterinary Medicine and Pharmacy in Košice (Slovak: Univerzita veterinárskeho lekárstva a farmácie v Košiciach; UVLF) is a public single faculty university in Košice, Slovakia that provides undergraduate, graduate and postgraduate education in veterinary medicine, animal science, cynology, pharmacy and food safety.

The university was established as the Veterinary College in Košice (Slovak: Vysoká škola veterinárska v Košiciach) by the Act of the Slovak National Council No. 1/1950 Coll. of 16 December 1949 on the establishment of the Veterinary College in Košice (Slovak: zákon Slovenskej národnej rady č. 1/1950 Zb. zák. SNR o zriadení Vysokej školy veterinárskej v Košiciach), though the Preparatory Committee for the Establishment of the Veterinary College in Košice (Slovak: Prípravný výbor pre založenie Vysokej školy zverolekárskej v Košiciach) appointed on 19 July 1949 under the chairmanship of Professor Ján Hovorka, the head of the Faculty of Agriculture of the Agricultural and Forestry Engineering College in Košice. The college began its teaching activities with its first lecture on 5 October 1949.

It became the first school of veterinary medicine in Slovakia and the second one in Czechoslovakia since the establishment of the Veterinary College in Brno on 12 December 1918. It still remains the only institution in Slovakia offering courses in veterinary medicine.
