= Vladimír Lengvarský =

Slovak politician

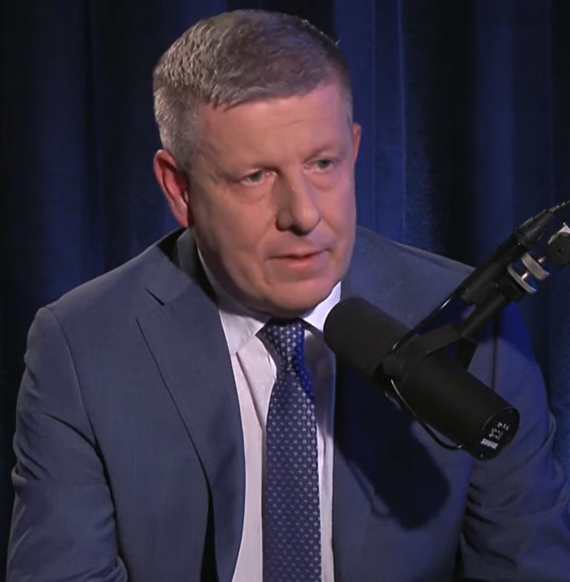

Minister of Health of the Slovak Republic
- In office 1 April 2021 – 3 March 2023
- President: Zuzana Čaputová
- Prime Minister: Eduard Heger
- Preceded by: Marek Krajčí
- Succeeded by: Eduard Heger (interim); Michal Palkovič

Personal details
- Born: 18 August 1969 (age 56) Levoča, Slovakia

Vladimír Lengvarský (born 18 August 1969) is a Slovak general and doctor. Between April 2021 and March 2023 he served as the Minister of Health in the cabinet of Prime Minister Eduard Heger.
