= Lívia Vašáková =

Slovak economist and manager

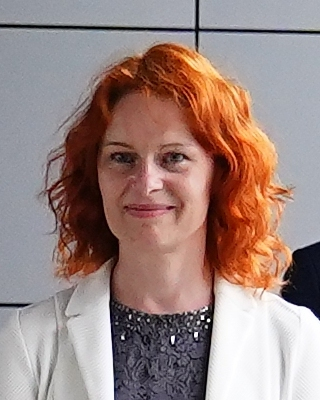
- Vašáková in 2021

Deputy Prime Minister of Slovakia for European Union Subsidies and the Recovery Plan
- In office 15 May 2023 – 25 October 2023
- Prime Minister: Ľudovít Ódor
- Preceded by: Office established
- Succeeded by: Peter Kmec

Personal details
- Born: Lívia Zemanovičová; 1977 (age 48–49) Bratislava, Czechoslovakia
- Education: Comenius University

Lívia Vašáková (née Zemanovičová; * 1977, Bratislava) is a Slovak economist and manager. She held the position of Deputy Prime Minister of the Slovak Republic for the Recovery and Resilience Plan and the use of EU funds from May to October 2023. Previously, she headed the Recovery Plan Section at the Slovak Government Office as Director General, the Economic Analysis Section at the Representation of the European Commission in Slovakia and worked at the Directorate General for Energy at the European Commission in Brussels.

== Early life and education ==
Lívia Vašáková has both Slovak and French Baccalaureate degrees from the Gymnázium na Metodovej ulici, in Bratislava, and graduated from the Faculty of Business Management of the University of Economics in Bratislava in 1997-2002. She completed her studies at Johannes Kepler University in Linz, LMU Munich, University of Aix-en-Provence in France and University of Ljubljana in Slovenia. She has a postgraduate diploma from Europa-Kolleg in Hamburg and in 2018 she completed her doctoral studies in management at the Faculty of Management of Comenius University in Bratislava.

== Professional career ==
From 2000 to 2004, Lívia Vašáková worked at INEKO - Institute for Economic and Social Reforms, where she worked on projects to improve corporate governance.

From 2003 to 2004 she worked in the European Committee of the Regions, then from 2005 to 2013 she worked as an economic analyst at the European Commission's Directorate-General for Energy, where she focused on energy modelling and economic impact assessment of energy legislation, particularly in the areas of greenhouse gas reduction, energy efficiency and renewables.

From February 2013 to 2020, she worked at the Representation of the European Commission in Slovakia, where she worked on the communication of European economic and social policies and led the economic analysis team.

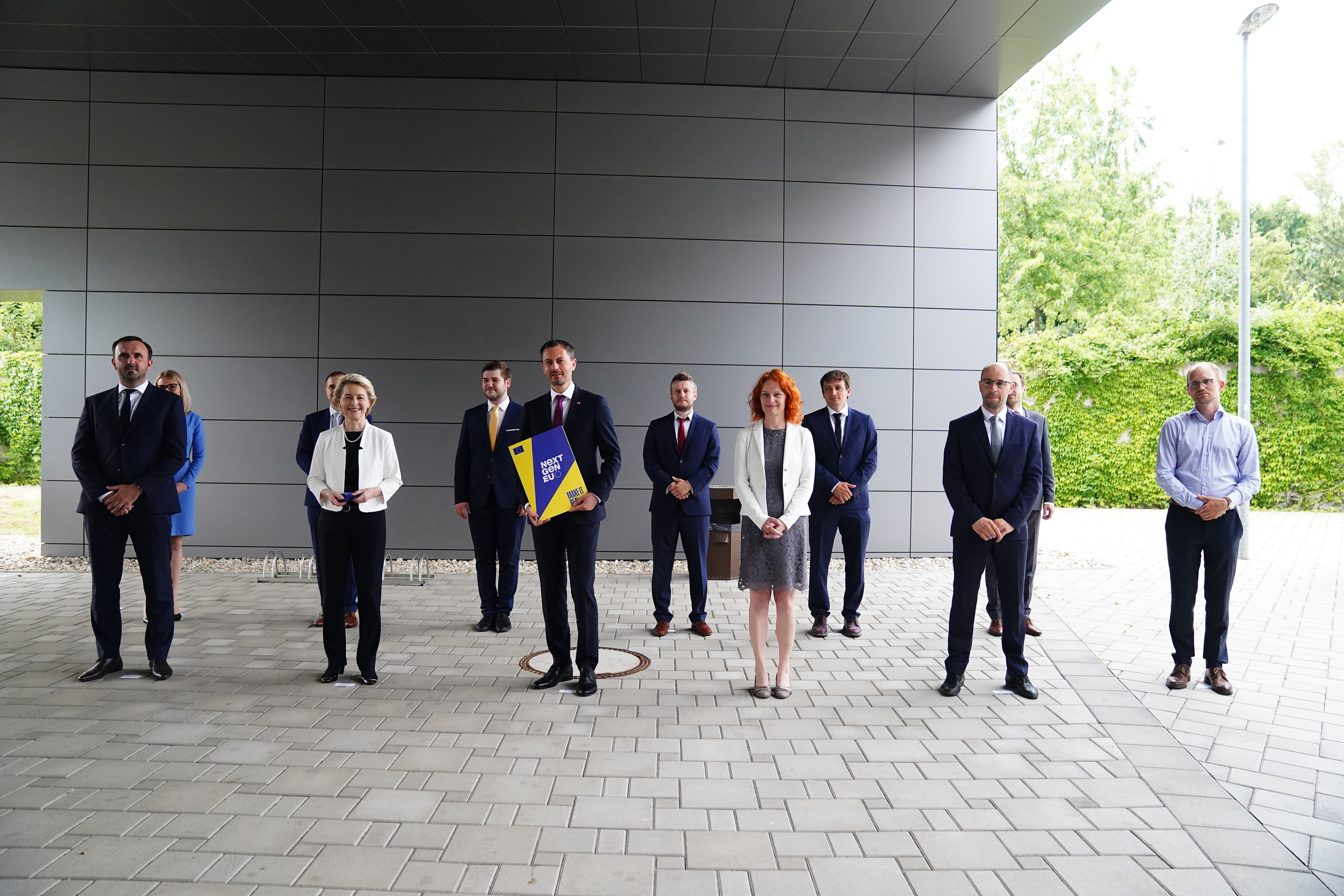
During her visit to Bratislava, European Commission President Ursula von der Leyen presents the official assessment of the Slovak recovery plan.

Since 2020, she has been Director General of the Recovery Plan Section at the Slovak Government Office. The Section also acts as the National Implementation and Coordination Authority (NIKA), which coordinates the implementation of the Recovery Plan at the national level and communicates with the European Union on payment requests.

The Recovery and Resilience Facility is the EU's joint response to the severe economic downturn caused by the COVID-19 pandemic. Its main objective is to support reforms and investments that will allow Slovakia to start catching up to the EU average standard of living again. Slovakia submitted its Recovery and Resilience Plan in April 2021 as the 5th European Union country. President of the European Commission Ursula von der Leyen described it as ambitious and of high quality: "Because speed is good, but there must also be quality, and there is a lot of quality in this plan," von der Leyen said.

Slovakia ranks among the European leaders in the implementation of the Recovery Plan and is one of the first countries to have already received money from the 2nd payment request of the Recovery Plan.

Since 15 May 2023, Lívia Vašáková has held the post of Deputy Prime Minister for the Recovery and Resilience Plan and the use of EU funds in the cabinet of Ludovít Ódor.

During her time in the caretaker government, Slovakia has submitted its 3rd payment application worth €815 million, the fifth country in the European Union to do so, and is preparing to submit its 4th application. Slovakia thus maintains its position as a European leader in the implementation of the Recovery and Resilience Plan. The introduction of regular "euro-governments" under her leadership brought about more rigorous monitoring and project management in the use of EU funds and the bureaucratic government managed to reduce the risk of a fall in EU funds by EUR 700 million. The Deputy Prime Minister's Office under her leadership also undertook an analysis of the use of EU funds in Slovakia. She analysed the main reasons for the poor use of EU funds in Slovakia in a publication entitled Catching up: 15 years of (un)used EU funds? and in cooperation with the Ministry of Investment, Regional Development and Informatisation proposed recommendations for their improvement.
