= Veľké Kosihy =

Veľké Kosihy Nagykeszi
- Municipality
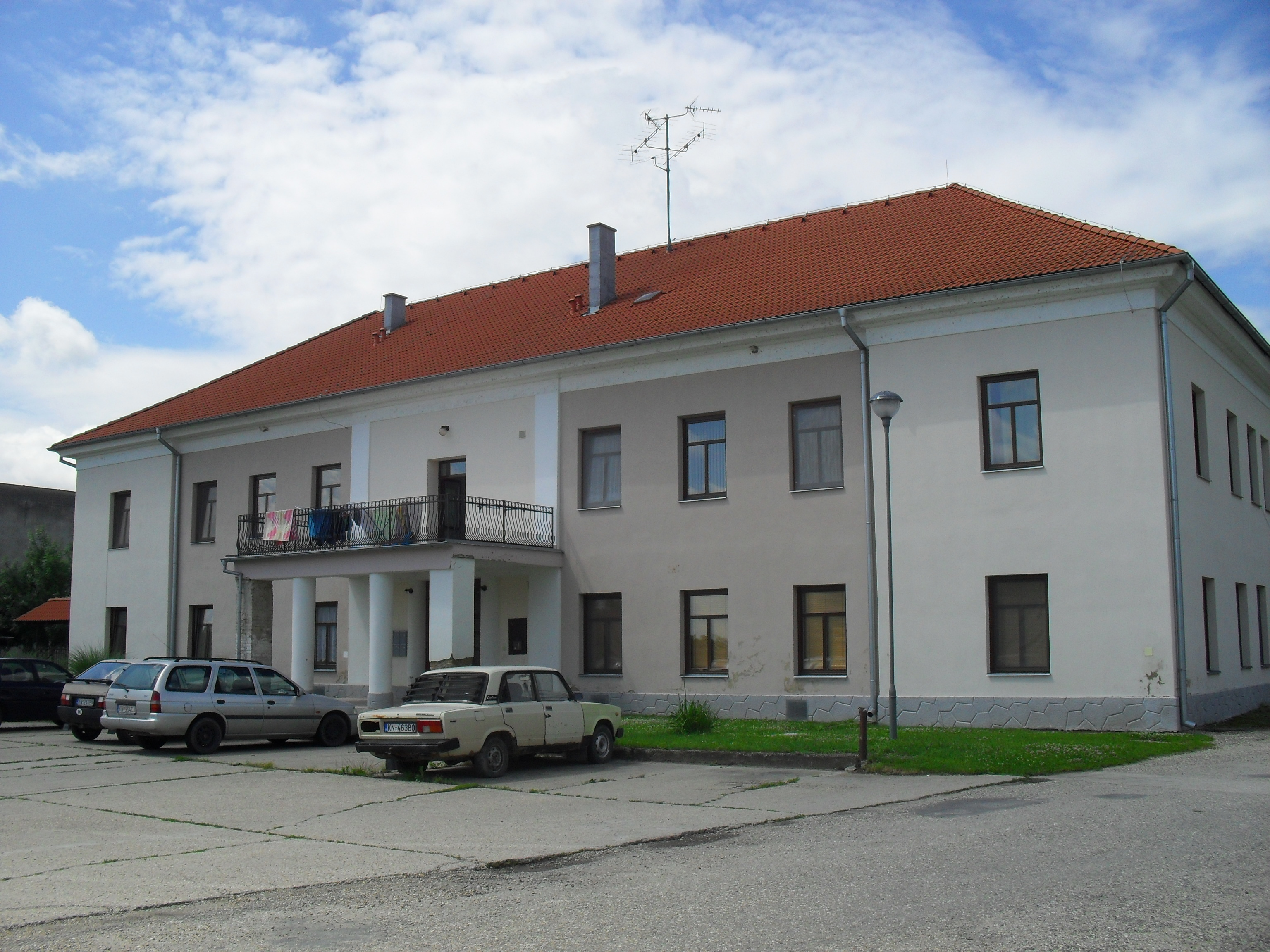
- Manor in the village

- Flag Coat of arms

- Location of Veľké Kosihy in the Nitra Region Location of Veľké Kosihy in Slovakia
- Coordinates: 47.77°N 17.88°E
- Country: Slovakia
- Region: Nitra Region
- District: Komárno District
- First mentioned: 1268

Government
  - Mayor: Lajos Csóka (Most–Híd)

Area
  - Total: 24.43 km^{2} (9.43 sq mi)
- Elevation: 110 m (360 ft)

Population (2025)
  - Total: 937
- Time zone: UTC+1 (CET)
  - Summer (DST): UTC+2 (CEST)
- Postal code: 946 21
- Area code: +421 35
- Vehicle registration plate (until 2022): KN
- Website: www.velkekosihy.sk

Veľké Kosihy (Hungarian: Nagykeszi, pronounced [ˈnɒɟkɛsi]) is a village and municipality in the Komárno District in the Nitra Region of southwest Slovakia.

== Etymology ==
The village was named after the Magyar tribe Keszi.

== Geography ==
The municipality lies at an altitude of 110 metres (360 ft) and covers an area of 24.43 km^{2} (9.43 sq mi) (2025).

== Population ==
Population statistic (10 years)
Year	1995	2005	2015	2025
Count	959	991	963	937
Difference		+3.33%	−2.82%	−2.69%

Population statistic
Year	2024	2025
Count	956	937
Difference		−1.98%

It has a population of 937 people (31 December 2025).

=== Ethnicity ===
Census 2021 (1+ %)
Ethnicity	Number	Fraction
Hungarian	750	79.36%
Slovak	185	19.57%
Not found out	83	8.78%
Romani	15	1.58%
Total	945	

In year 2021 was 945 people by ethnicity 750 as Hungarian, 185 as Slovak, 83 as Not found out, 15 as Romani, 2 as Russian, 2 as Other, 1 as Czech, 1 as Irish and 1 as Romanian.

Note on population: The difference values of population numbers in the table "Population statistic" and in the sections "Ethnicity" & "Religion" is caused by the use of various statistical methods.

=== Religion ===
Census 2021 (1+ %)
Religion	Number	Fraction
None	343	36.3%
Calvinist Church	248	26.24%
Roman Catholic Church	244	25.82%
Not found out	63	6.67%
Evangelical Church	22	2.33%
Greek Catholic Church	10	1.06%
Total	945	

In year 2021 was 945 people by religion 343 from None, 248 from Calvinist Church, 244 from Roman Catholic Church, 63 from Not found out, 22 from Evangelical Church, 10 from Greek Catholic Church, 4 from Christian Congregations in Slovakia, 3 from Other and not ascertained christian church, 2 from Eastern Orthodox Church, 2 from Jehovah's Witnesses, 2 from Other, 1 from Islam and 1 from Church of the Brethren.

== History ==
In the 9th century, the territory of Veľké Kosihy became part of the Kingdom of Hungary. In historical records the village was first mentioned in 1268. After the Austro-Hungarian army disintegrated in November 1918, Czechoslovak troops occupied the area, later acknowledged internationally by the Treaty of Trianon. Between 1938 and 1945 Veľké Kosihy once more became part of Miklós Horthy's Hungary through the First Vienna Award. From 1945 until the Velvet Divorce, it was part of Czechoslovakia. Since then it has been part of Slovakia.

== Facilities ==
The village has a public library and a football pitch.

== Notable people ==
- Ľudovít Ódor - Prime Minister of Slovakia (2023)
