= Ruská Bystrá =

Village and municipality in Slovakia

Ruská Bystrá Oroszsebes
- Municipality
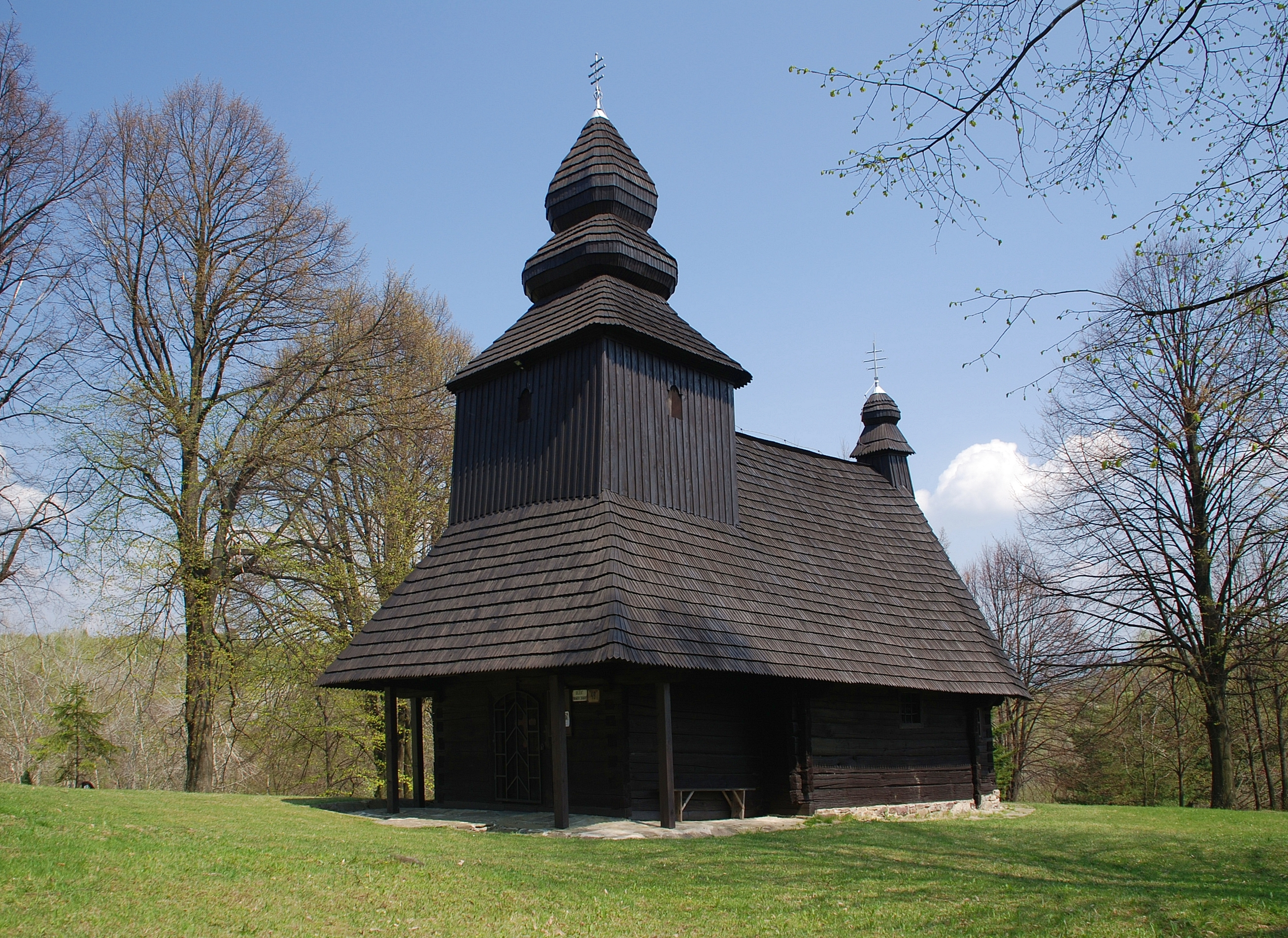
- Church of Saint Nicolas of Ruská Bystrá

- Flag

- Location of Ruská Bystrá in the Košice Region Location of Ruská Bystrá in Slovakia
- Coordinates: 48.85°N 22.30°E
- Country: Slovakia
- Region: Košice Region
- District: Sobrance District
- First mentioned: 1405

Area
  - Total: 11.77 km^{2} (4.54 sq mi)
- Elevation: 418 m (1,371 ft)

Population (2025)
  - Total: 109
- Time zone: UTC+1 (CET)
  - Summer (DST): UTC+2 (CEST)
- Postal code: 726 4
- Area code: +421 56
- Vehicle registration plate (until 2022): SO
- Website: www.ruskabystra.sk

Ruská Bystrá is a village and municipality in the Sobrance District in the Košice Region of east Slovakia.

== History ==
In historical records the village was first mentioned in 1405. There is a Church of St. Nicholas in Ruská Bystrá built at the beginning of the 18th century which has just 2 towers and the shape of its almost perfect geometric roof resembles traditional houses of peasants. Interior with religious artefacts dates back to the 18th century as well.

== Geography ==
The municipality lies at an altitude of 418 metres (1,371 ft) and covers an area of 11.77 km^{2} (4.54 sq mi) (2025).

== Population ==
Population statistic (10 years)
Year	1995	2005	2015	2025
Count	156	132	118	109
Difference		−15.38%	−10.60%	−7.62%

Population statistic
Year	2024	2025
Count	107	109
Difference		+1.86%

It has a population of 109 people (31 December 2025).

=== Ethnicity ===
Census 2021 (1+ %)
Ethnicity	Number	Fraction
Slovak	98	90.74%
Rusyn	40	37.03%
Not found out	3	2.77%
Total	108	

In year 2021 was 108 people by ethnicity 98 as Slovak, 40 as Rusyn, 3 as Not found out, 1 as Czech and 1 as Ukrainian.

Note on population: The difference values of population numbers in the table "Population statistic" and in the sections "Ethnicity" & "Religion" is caused by the use of various statistical methods.

=== Religion ===
Census 2021 (1+ %)
Religion	Number	Fraction
Greek Catholic Church	93	86.11%
Roman Catholic Church	8	7.41%
Not found out	3	2.78%
None	3	2.78%
Total	108	

In year 2021 was 108 people by religion 93 from Greek Catholic Church, 8 from Roman Catholic Church, 3 from Not found out, 3 from None and 1 from Eastern Orthodox Church.

== Facilities ==
The village has a public library
