= Michal Palkovič (pathologist) =

Slovak pathologist (born 1974)

Minister of Health
- In office 15 May 2023 – 25 October 2023
- Prime Minister: Ľudovít Ódor
- Preceded by: Eduard Heger (acting); Vladimír Lengvarský
- Succeeded by: Zuzana Dolinková

Personal details
- Born: 11 June 1974 (age 51) Bratislava, Czechoslovakia

Michal Palkovič (born 11 June 1974) is a Slovak pathologist. He served as the State Secretary in charge of the Ministry of Health since March 2023 and as Minister of Health from May to October 2023.

== Biography ==
Palkovič was born in Bratislava. He studied medicine at the Comenius University, graduating in 1999. In 2006 he received a Ph.D. in Pathology from the same university. He has taught both at the Comenius University as well as the University of Ss. Cyril and Methodius.

In 2005 he has been employed at the Healthcare Surveillance Authority, where he has led the Pathology section. He was involved with digitalization of autopsy documentation as well as establishing a system for reporting the COVID-19 pandemic victims in Slovakia.

On 14 March 2023 the Prime Minister Eduard Heger put Palkovič in charge of the Health Ministry following the resignation of Vladimír Lengvarský. The government had previously failed a no-confidence vote and thus it was not allowed to add new ministers. For this reason, Palkovič was formally appointed a State Secretary and Heger himself took the position of the interim health minister. As Heger was already the interim Finance and Economy minister, Palkovič was given the authority to de facto lead the ministry. Following the collapse of the Cabinet of Eduard Heger, the president Zuzana Čaputová appointed Palkovič to the office of the Minister of Health in the technocratic government of Ľudovít Ódor.
