= Ľudovít Ódor =

Prime Minister of Slovakia in 2023

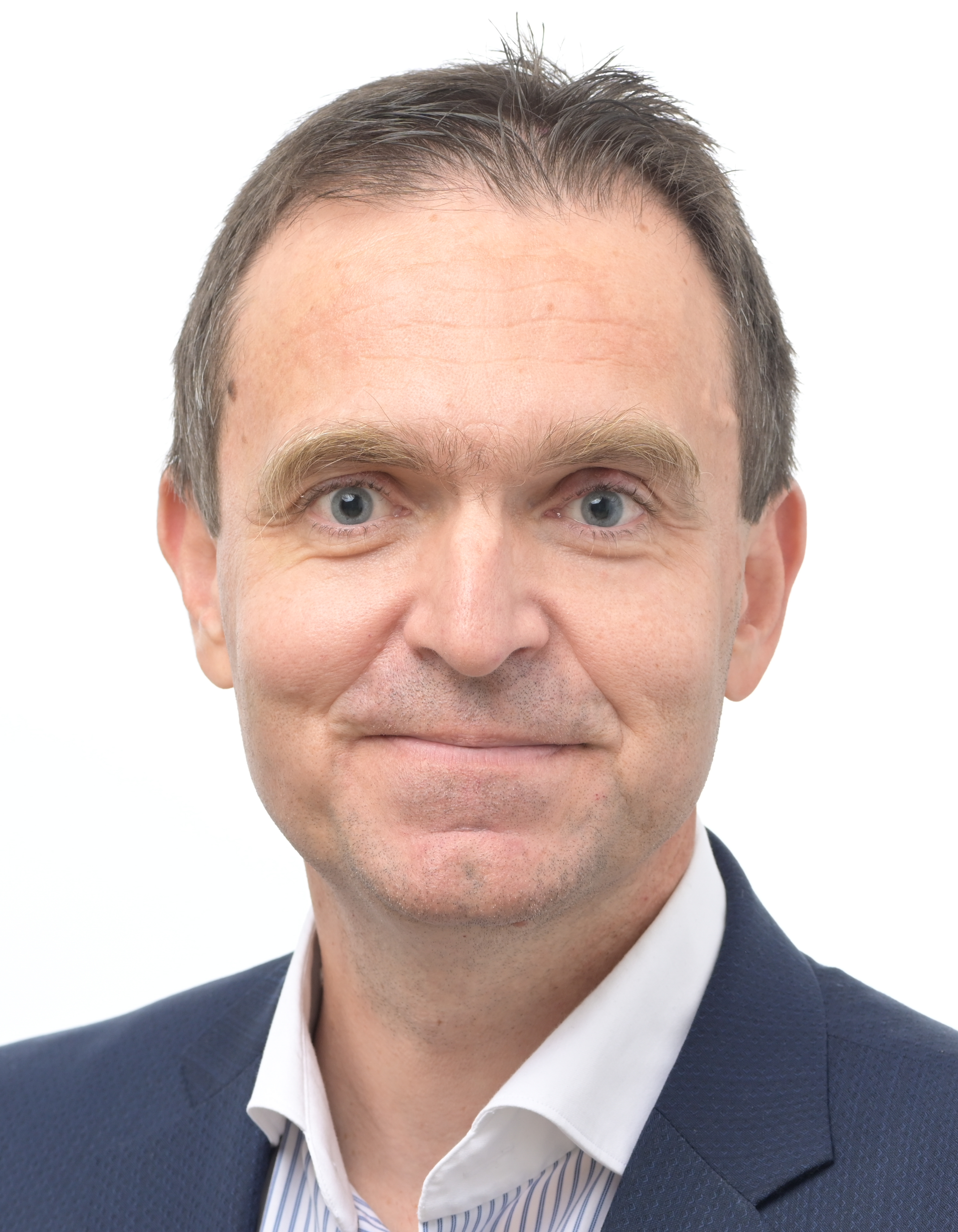

Member of the European Parliament for Slovakia
- Incumbent
- Assumed office 16 July 2024

Prime Minister of Slovakia
- In office 15 May 2023 – 25 October 2023
- President: Zuzana Čaputová
- Deputy: Lívia Vašáková
- Preceded by: Eduard Heger
- Succeeded by: Robert Fico

Minister of Interior
- Acting; 19 July 2023 – 25 October 2023
- Prime Minister: Himself
- Preceded by: Ivan Šimko
- Succeeded by: Matúš Šutaj Eštok

Deputy Governor of the National Bank of Slovakia
- In office 20 February 2018 – 14 May 2023
- Governor: Jozef Makúch; Peter Kažimír
- Preceded by: Ján Tóth

Personal details
- Born: 2 July 1976 (age 50) Veľké Kosihy, Czechoslovakia
- Party: Progressive Slovakia
- Other political affiliations: Alliance of Liberals and Democrats for Europe
- Children: 2
- Education: Comenius University (Mgr.)
- Occupation: Economist; politician
- Website: www.odor.sk

Ľudovít Ódor (Hungarian: Ódor Lajos; born 2 July 1976) is a Slovak economist and politician who served as Prime Minister of Slovakia from May to October 2023, heading a technocratic cabinet. From July to October 2023, he also served as Minister of the Interior. Prior to his appointment as prime minister, Ódor served as Deputy Governor of the National Bank of Slovakia, from 2018 to 2023. He was the first Slovak prime minister to hail from the ethnic Hungarian minority in Slovakia.

Ódor led the liberal Progressive Slovakia's list for the 2024 European parliament election.

== Early life and education ==
Ľudovít Ódor was born into an ethnically Hungarian family in the village of Veľké Kosihy (Hungarian: Nagykeszi), near Komárno, on 2 July 1976. He finished his secondary studies at the Hungarian-language Selye János Gymnasium in his hometown. He attended Comenius University in Bratislava, graduating in 1999 with a master's degree in mathematics and management. In addition to his native Hungarian, he speaks Slovak and English fluently.

== Economic career (1999–2023) ==
After completing his studies at Comenius University, Ódor became an analyst for Československá obchodní banka in April 1999, leaving his position in 2001 to work for the Slovak Rating Agency; after two years, Ódor became the chief economist of the Ministry of Finance of the Slovak Republic. In January 2006, he became a board member of the National Bank of Slovakia and advised then-prime minister Iveta Radičová and then-finance minister Ivan Mikloš from 2010 to 2012. In September 2015, Ódor was appointed vice-chairman of the European Union's Network of Independent Fiscal Institutions, serving until October 2017, when he became a member of the supervisory board of Slovenská sporiteľňa and a member of the Council for Budget Responsibility until February 2018.

In February 2018 Ódor became vice-governor of the National Bank of Slovakia, following a nomination by Most–Híd. He is a co-founder of the Institute for Financial Policy, which he managed from 2003 to 2005, and the Value for Money Department at the Ministry of Finance as well as the independent Council for Budget Responsibility. In addition, Ódor has been a visiting professor at the Central European University since 2016. He is also a member of the study council of the Hungarian College for Advanced Studies in Bratislava (PMSZ).

During his career Ódor co-authored the introduction of a 19% flat tax as part of Mikuláš Dzurinda's 2004 tax reform, which improved Slovakia's image among foreign investors and set the country on course to become a European tiger economy. He also played a role in the reform of the pension system, the adoption of the euro, and the creation of budget rules.

== Premiership (2023) ==
On 7 May 2023, caretaker prime minister Eduard Heger—who led a majority in parliament until September 2022—resigned after a series of resignations by ministers who could not be replaced during a caretaker government. Heger asked the president to appoint a technocratic government. Ódor and his cabinet, picked by President Zuzana Čaputová, were inaugurated on 15 May. On 19 July Interior Minister Ivan Šimko's mandate was revoked following disagreements between him and the leadership of the police, after which Ódor took over Šimko's ministerial duties. A snap parliamentary election was held on 30 September 2023, which resulted in a new coalition government helmed by Robert Fico. Fico succeeded Ódor as prime minister on 25 October 2023.

=== Domestic policy ===
According to his website, Ódor believes in pragmatism and evidence-based economics.

== Personal life ==
Ódor is married and the father of two children.

== Publications ==
- Beblavý, Miroslav; Cobham, David; Ódor, L'udovít, eds. (2011). The Euro Area and the Financial Crisis. New York: Cambridge University Press. doi:10.1017/CBO9781139044554. ISBN 978-1-107-01474-9. LCCN 2011027489.
- Ódor, L'udovít, ed. (2017). Rethinking Fiscal Policy after the Crisis. New York: Cambridge University Press. doi:10.1017/9781316675861. ISBN 978-1-107-16058-3. LCCN 2016050853.

Political offices
Preceded by Eduard Heger	Prime Minister of Slovakia; 2023	Succeeded by Robert Fico
Preceded by Ivan Šimko	Minister of the Interior; 2023	Succeeded by Matúš Šutaj Eštok
