= Slovak euro coins =

Designs of Slovak currency

The Slovak euro coins are the European monetary union euro coins issued by Slovakia since 2009. They feature three separate designs for the three series of coins.

Slovakia has been a member of the European Union since May 2004, and is a member of the European Economic and Monetary Union. Slovakia adopted the euro on 1 January 2009, replacing its previous currency, the Slovak koruna.

== Slovak euro design ==
For images of the common side and a detailed description of the coins, see euro coins.

Depiction of Slovak euro coinage | Obverse side
€0.01	€0.02	€0.05
Kriváň, a symbolic mountain in the High Tatras as designed by Drahomír Zobek.
€0.10	€0.20	€0.50
Bratislava Castle as designed by Ján Černaj and Pavol Károly.
€1.00	€2.00	€2 Coin Edge
The Coat of arms of Slovakia, the Double Cross on Three Hills, as designed by Ivan Řehák.

== Circulating mintage quantities ==
Face Value	€0.01	€0.02	€0.05	€0.10	€0.20	€0.50	€1.00	€2.00
2009	90,828,000	80,905,000	84,957,000	74,800,000	66,602,000	59,400,000	46,860,000	35,750,000
2010	30,070,000	50,070,000	s	s	s	s	s	s
2011	20,455,000	15,055,000	s	s	s	s	s	5,055,000
2012	10,545,000	s	s	s	s	s	s	s
2013	26,058,800	s	s	s	s	s	s	s
2014	26,275,000	5,025,000	s	s	s	s	s	s
2015	23,111,000	12,564,000	s	s	s	s	s	7,350,000
2016	28,899,000	17,026,000	s	s	s	s	s	2,026,000
2017	20,538,000	13,668,000	6,138,000	s	s	s	s	2,118,000
2018	20,606,000	12,130,000	8,026,000	s	s	s	s	s
2019	30,020,100	14,470,100	4,045,100	3,020,100	s	s	s	s
2020	57,702,100	25,122,100	16,510,100	12,137,100	s	s	s	3,134,100
2021	14,669,400	7,335,400	6,319,400	4,019,400	s	s	1,444,400	s
2022	s	s	10,513,800	2,113,800	s	s	s	3,013,800
2023	s	s	3,065,300	3,015,300	s	s	s	s
2024	s	s	10,000,000	5,000,000	s	s	1,000,000	2,300,000
2025	s	s	10,000,000	9,000,000	s	s	1,000,000	5,000,000
2026	s	s	10,000,000	4,000,000	1,500,000	s	s	11,000,000
s Small quantities minted for sets only

== Identifying marks ==
National Identifier	"SLOVENSKO"
Mint Mark	
Engravers Initials	1, 2, 5-cent Z 10, 20, 50-cent JČ (stylised) and 'PK' (stylised) 1, 2 euro IŘ (stylised)
€2 Edge inscription	

== €2 commemorative coins ==
Year	Subject	Volume

== Euro adoption ==
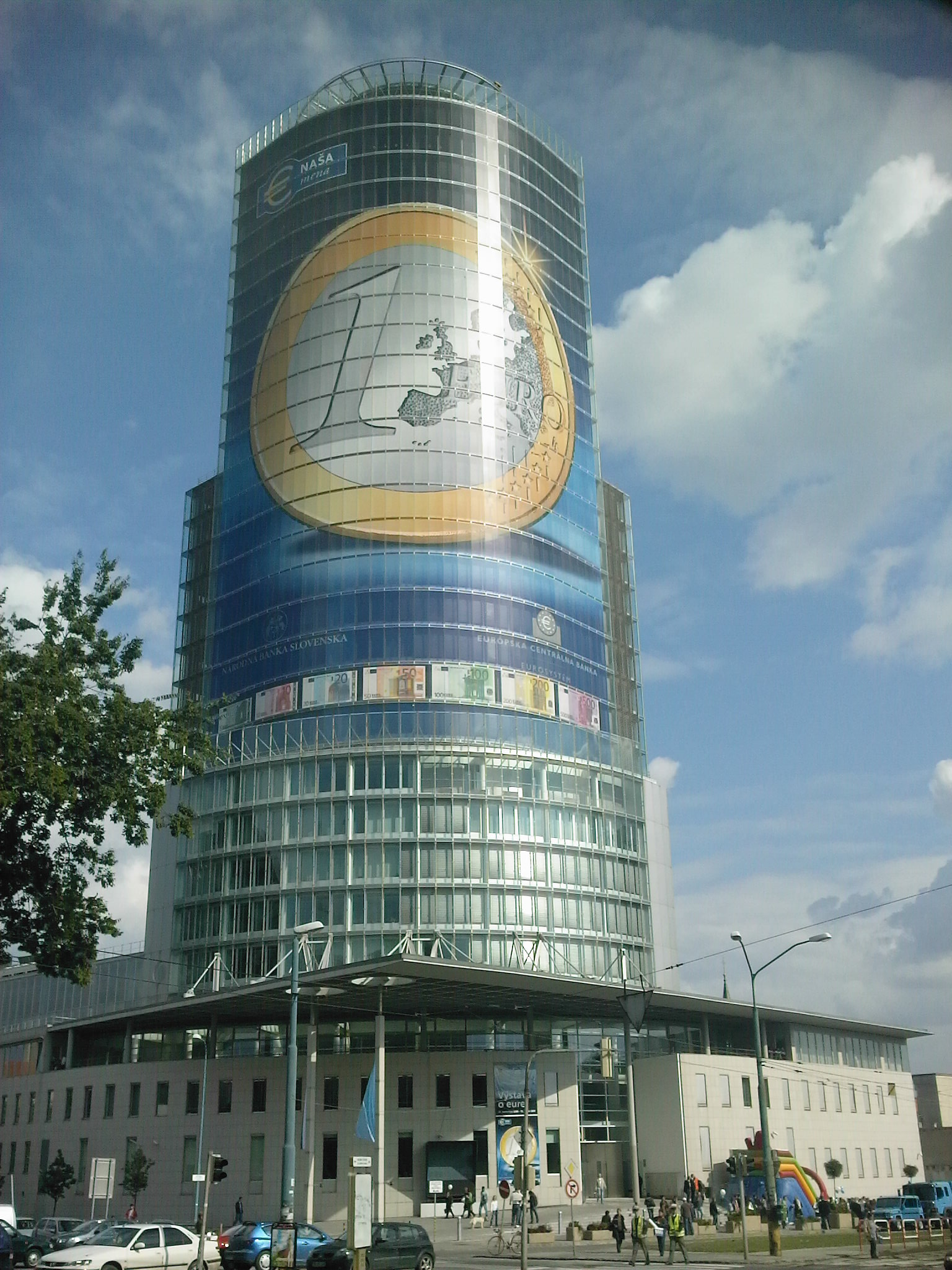
Decoration at the building of National Bank of Slovakia in September 2008, ahead of Slovakia's adoption of the euro

In 2005, an official public contest for Slovak euro coin designs was held, which took place over two rounds. The deadline for the first round was 31 January 2005, after which the ten top designers chosen by the National Bank of Slovakia (NBS) were invited to make plaster reliefs of their designs. In the second round, the NBS called a public vote conducted from 12 November until 20 November 2005 on the ten designs that were picked from the over 200 submissions. On 21 November 2005, the results were made public; the most popular design was the coat of arms of Slovakia. On 20 December 2005, the design for the Slovak euro coins was officially made public on the NBS website. Since then Slovakia has been doing economic reforms to be able to adopt the euro.

After three years of reforms, on 1 April 2008, the NBS announced their plan for withdrawal, disposal and destruction of the Slovak koruna notes and coins. On 7 May 2008, the European Commission approved the application and asked member states to endorse the bid during the EU finance minister's meeting in July 2008. Slovakia's 12-month inflation was 2.2% compared with 3.2% that is required. Annual inflation however was 3.6% for March 2008. Fiscal deficit was 2.2% versus the reference value of 3.0%. And finally the government debt ratio was 29.4% of GDP in 2007, well below the maximum ratio of 60.0%.

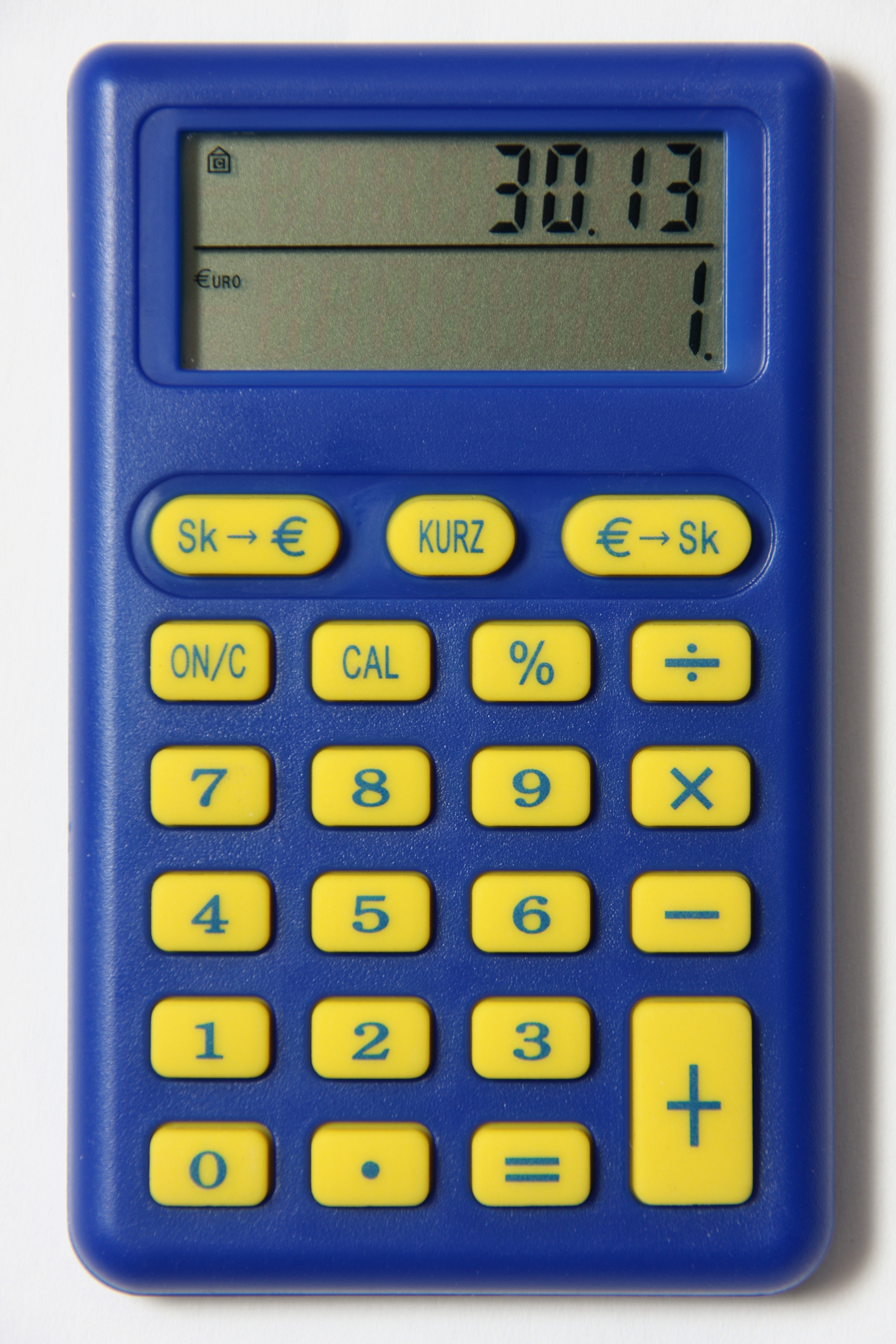
Slovak koruna-euro converter calculator

On 3 June 2008, the European Union finance ministers gave Slovakia the green light to join the euro zone in 2009 while urging the country to be ready to fight inflation with tight fiscal policies. "We are happy to see Slovakia join the euro zone on 1 January 2009," Jean-Claude Juncker, who chairs the Eurogroup of euro zone finance ministers, told reporters.

Slovakia's mint has been tasked to produce some 500 million euro and cent coins. As a preparation for the change on 1 January, starting from November 2008, these coins will be distributed to businesses all over Slovakia.

On 17 June 2008, the European Parliament agreed to Slovakia's bid to join the euro zone from the start of 2009, urging the country to tighten fiscal policies to avoid inflationary risks. The assembly voted 589 to 17 with 86 abstentions to approve a report that said the European Union newcomer met all euro entry criteria. However, the parliament's role is consultative only. Slovakia's bid to become the euro zone's 16th member was approved by EU leaders. EU finance ministers set the final conversion rate of the Slovak koruna into the euro on 8 July 2008.

On 19 June 2008, the leaders of the EU Member States confirmed Slovakia's readiness to join the eurozone on 1 January 2009. "I congratulate Slovakia for meeting all the relevant criteria", said the current President of the European Council and Slovenian Prime Minister Janez Janša.

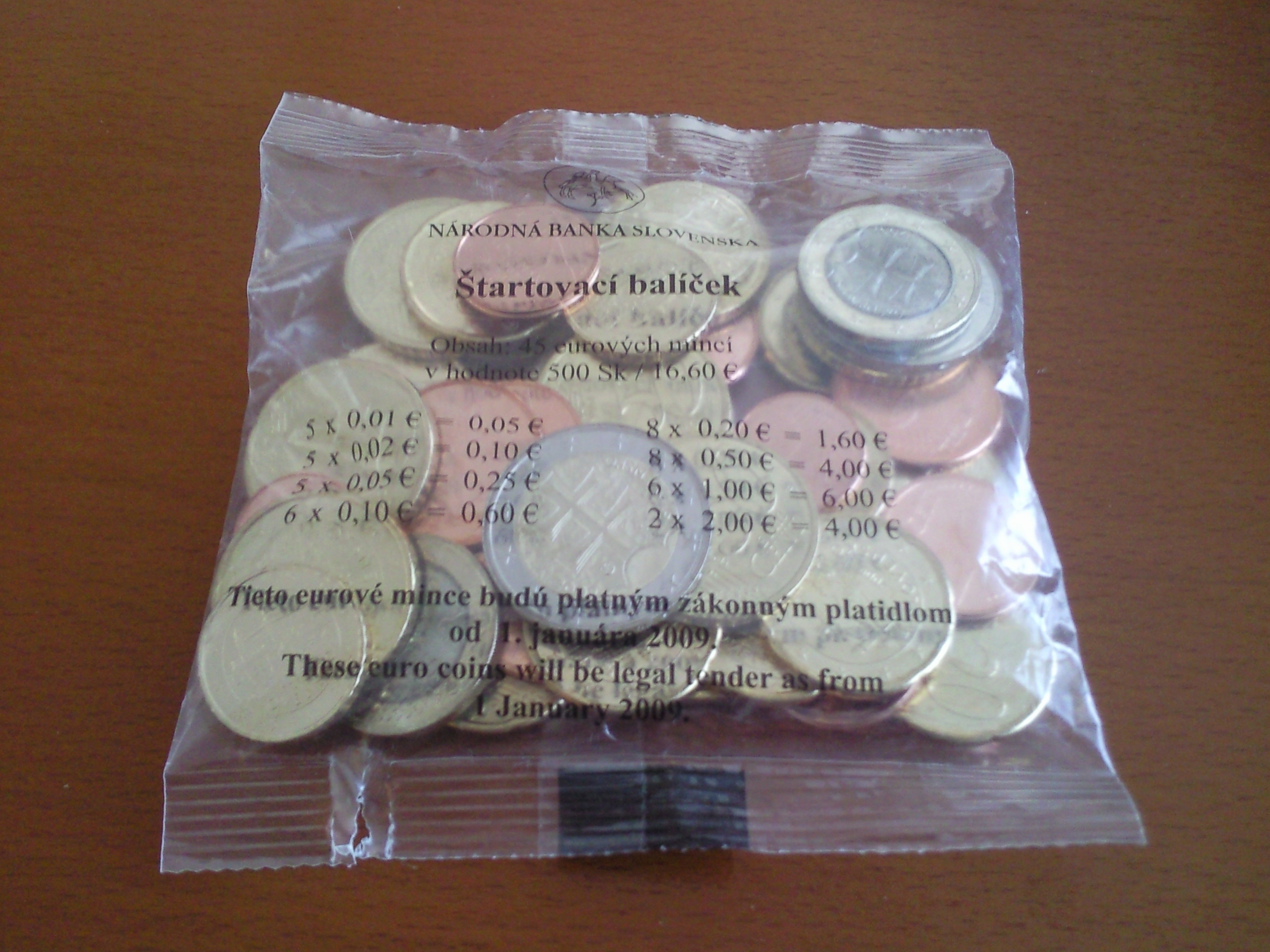
Slovak euro coins starting set

On 8 July 2008, the European Union formally invited Slovakia to join the European single currency and set the official rate at which korunas will be exchanged for euros – 30.1260 korunas to the euro.

On 5 September 2008, as part of the preparations for euro adoption, the NBS announced that by the end the year Slovakia planned to transport over €7 billion in banknotes from Austria and to mint coins worth €167 million to pre-stock itself with the new currency. Start-up packages containing the EUR equivalent of 500 Sk (€16.60 ) were sold at all post offices from 1 December 2008. The package contained 45 Slovak euro coins with nominal values from 1-cent (0.30 Sk) to 2 euro (60.25 Sk).

A few days before the €-day, the government spent €6.5 million to educate the public about the new currency.
