= Žilina Region =

Region of Slovakia

Žilina Region Žilinský kraj
- Region
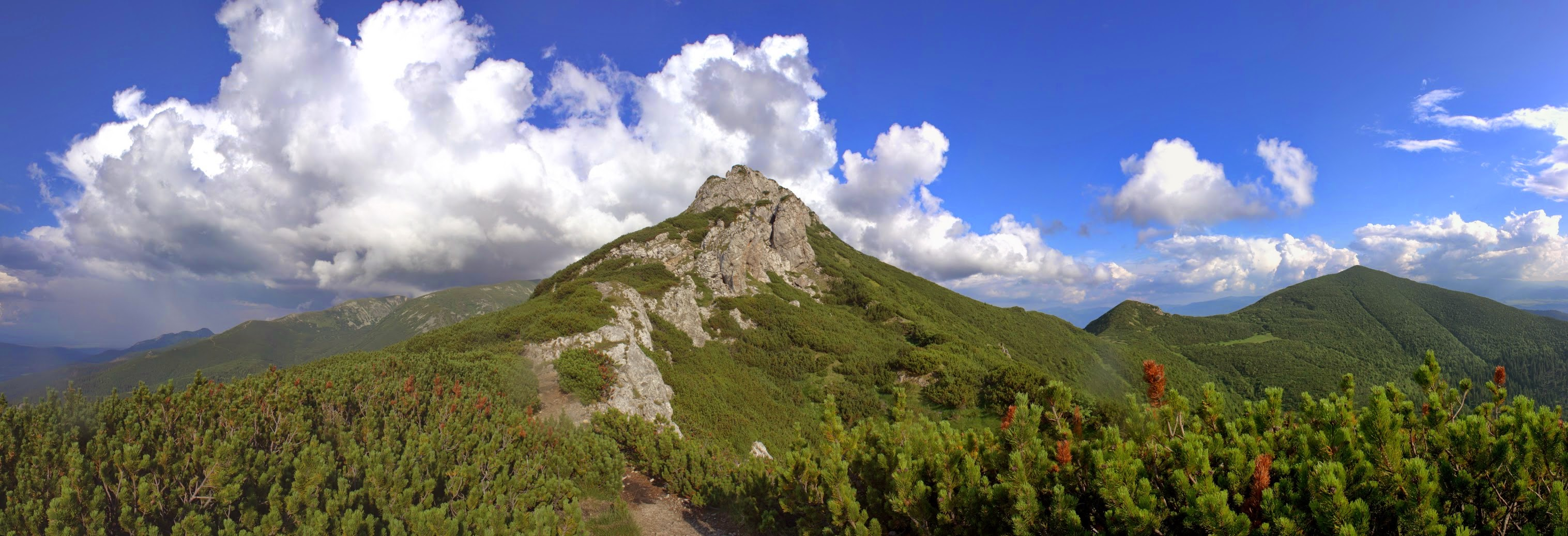
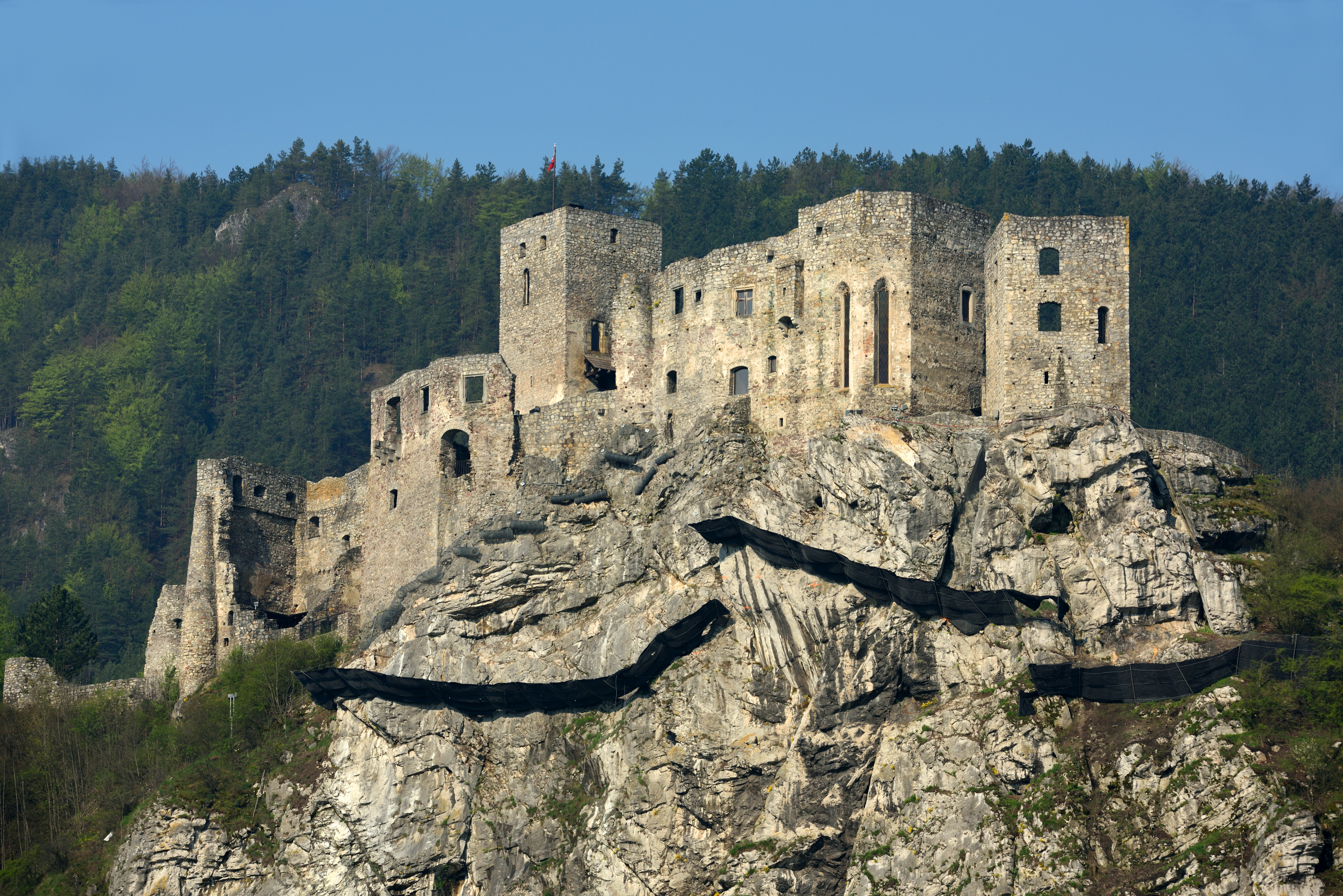
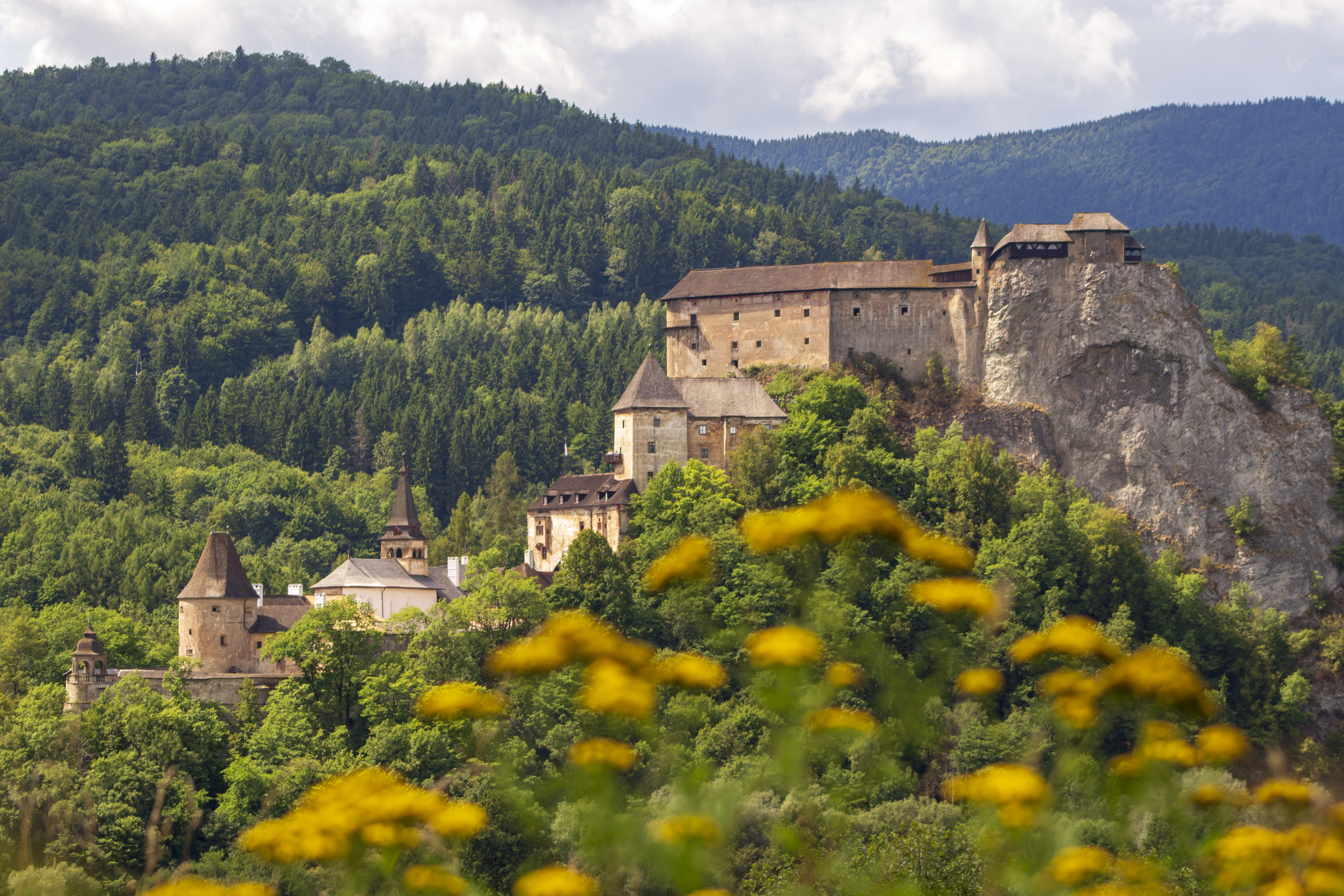
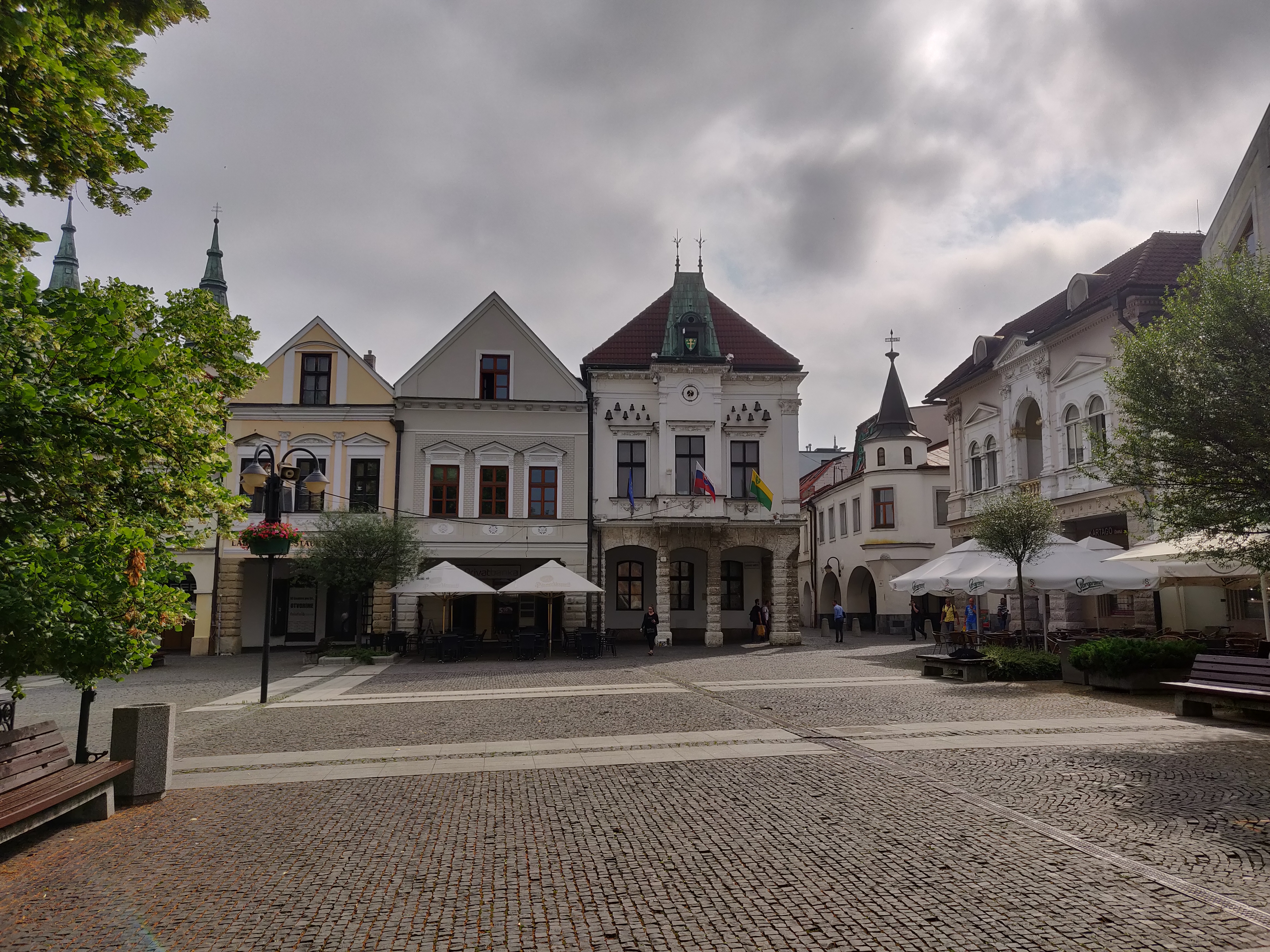
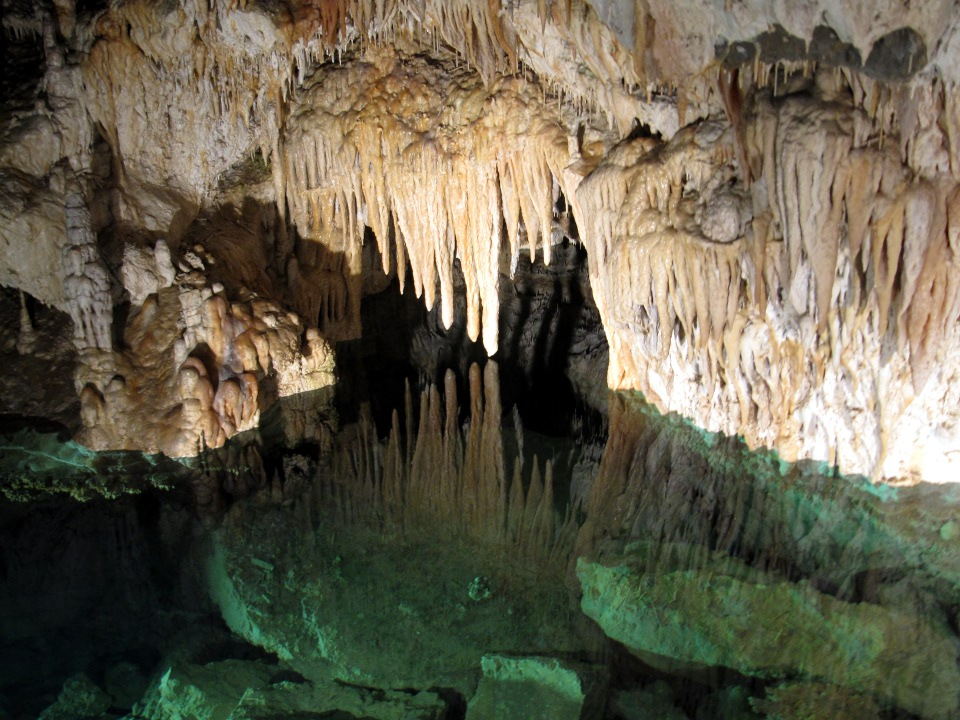
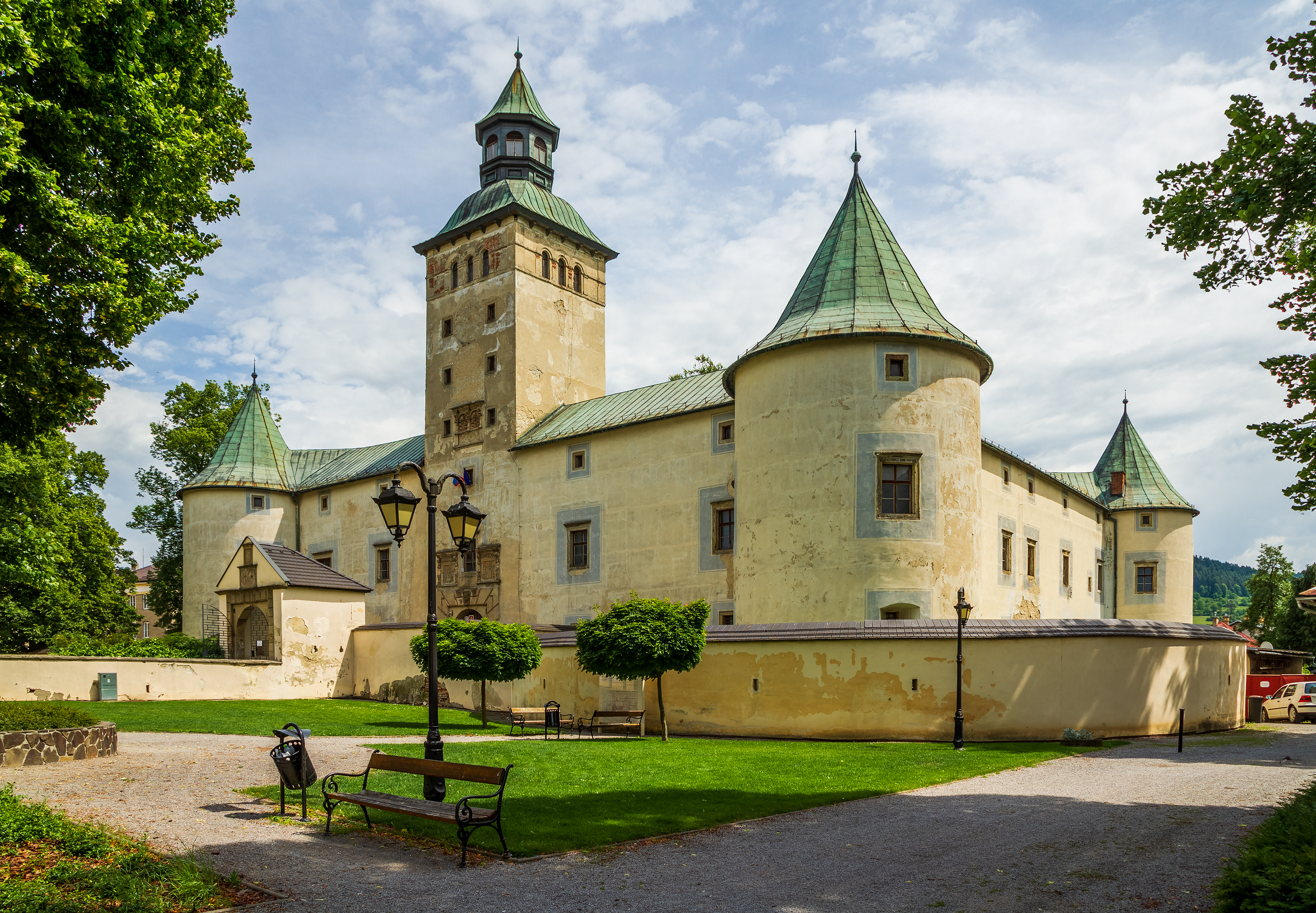
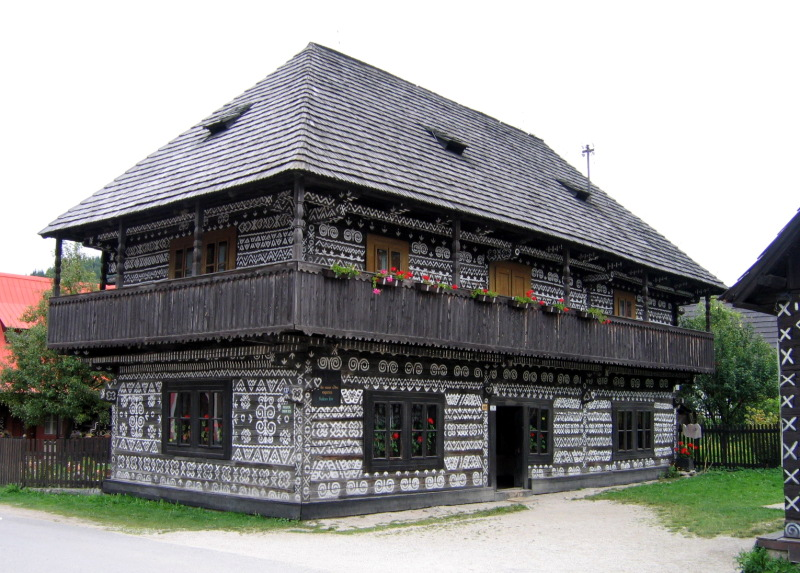
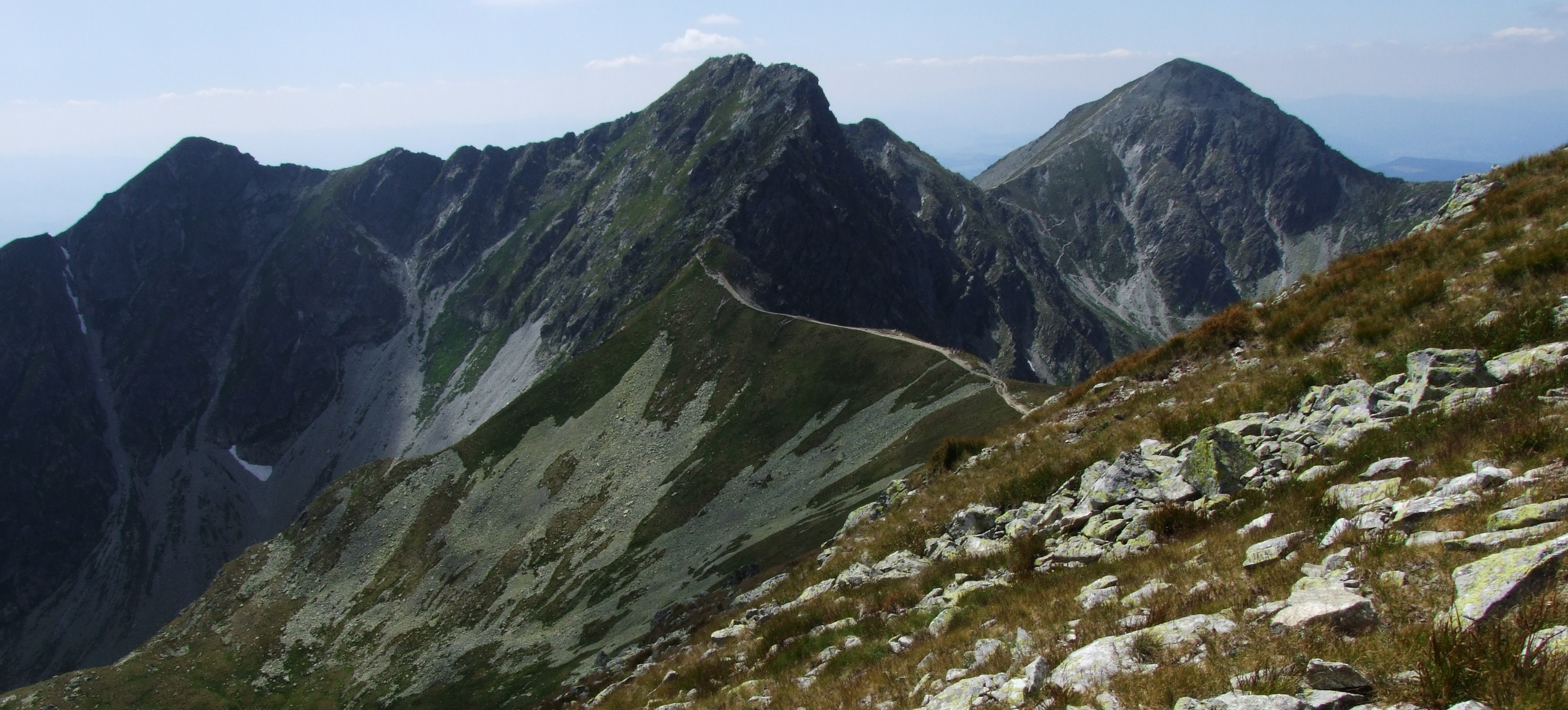
- From the top to bottom-left; Sivý Vrch, Strečno Castle, Orava Castle, Žilina, Demänovská Cave of Liberty, Bytča, Čičmany, Tatras - Western Tatras

- Flag Coat of arms

- Location of the Žilina Region in Slovakia
- Country: Slovakia
- Capital: Žilina

Government
  - Body: Regional Council of Žilina Region
  - Governor: Erika Jurinová (Slovakia Movement)

Area
  - Total: 6,808.40 km^{2} (2,628.74 sq mi)
- Highest elevation: 2,495 m (8,186 ft)
- Lowest elevation: 301 m (988 ft)

Population (2025)
  - Total: 684,190

GDP
  - Total: €8.901 billion (2016)
  - Per capita: €12,889 (2016)
- Time zone: UTC+1 (CET)
  - Summer (DST): UTC+2 (CEST)
- ISO 3166 code: SK-ZI
- Website: www.zilinsky-kraj.sk

The Žilina Region (Slovak: Žilinský kraj; Polish: Kraj żyliński; Hungarian: Zsolnai kerület) is one of the eight Slovak administrative regions and consists of 11 districts (okresy) and 315 municipalities, from which 18 have a town status. The region was established in 1923, however, in its present borders exists from 1996. It is a more industrial region with several large towns. Žilina is the region administrative center and there is a strong cultural environment in Martin.

== Geography ==
It is located in northern Slovakia and has an area of 6808.40 km². The whole area is mountainous, belonging to the Western Carpathians. Some of the mountain ranges in the region include Javorníky, the Lesser Fatra and the Greater Fatra in the west, Oravská Magura, Chočské vrchy, Low Tatras and Western Tatras in the east. The whole area is part of the Váh river basin. Its main left tributaries are the Turiec and Rajčanka rivers and its right tributaries are Belá, Orava and Kysuca. The national parks on the region's territory are the Lesser, Greater Fatra, Low Tatras and Tatra; landscape protected areas are Strážovské vrchy, Kysuce and Horná Orava. The region borders Prešov Region in the east, Banská Bystrica Region in the south, Trenčín Region in the south-west and west, Czech Zlín Region and Moravian-Silesian regions in the north-west and Polish Silesian and Lesser Poland voivodeships in the north and north-east.

== History ==
After the fall of Great Moravia in the early 9th century, the area became part of the Kingdom of Hungary in the 11th century practically to 1920. Before the break it was part of the Hungarian counties of Trencsén, Turóc, Árva and Liptó. After incorporation into Czechoslovakia, the counties continued to exist under their Slovak names of Trenčín, Turiec, Orava and Liptov, but only to 1923, when they were replaced by (grand) counties ((veľ)župy) From 1928 it was part of the administrative unit "Slovak Land". During the WWII Slovak Republic, the area was split between Trenčín and Tatra counties. Since 1928 it was part of the administrative after reincorporation into Czechoslovakia in 1945, the pre-war state was restored. In 1949-1960 there was a unit with the name Žilina Region but it was abolished in 1960 and the area became part of new Central Slovak Region, of which it was part until 1990 (except 1969-70) when it was abolished. After the independence of Slovakia in 1993, the current region was established in 1996. Since the administrative regions became autonomous in 2002, it is governed by the Žilina Self-Governing Region.

== Population ==
Historical population
Year	Pop.	±%
1970	570,624	—
1980	629,927	+10.4%
1991	668,771	+6.2%
2001	692,332	+3.5%
2011	688,851	−0.5%
2021	691,613	+0.4%
Source: Censuses

Population statistic (10 years)
Year	1995	2005	2015	2025
Count	685,365	694,763	690,434	684,190
Difference		+1.37%	−0.62%	−0.90%

Population statistic
Year	2024	2025
Count	686,063	684,190
Difference		−0.27%

It has a population of 684,190 people (31 December 2025). The population density in the region is 100.49/km^{2} (260.3/sq mi) (2025). The largest towns are Žilina, Martin, Liptovský Mikuláš, Ružomberok, Čadca and Dolný Kubín.

=== Ethnicity ===
Census 2021 (1+%)
Ethnicity	Number	Fraction
Slovak	659,150	95.3%
Not found out	29,038	4.19%
Total	691,613	

In year 2021 was 691,613 people by ethnicity 659,150 as Slovak, 29,038 as Not found out, 6465 as Czech, 2645 as Romani, 2198 as Other, 932 as Hungarian, 923 as Polish, 905 as Russian, 710 as German, 647 as Rusyn, 515 as Ukrainian, 244 as Moravian, 217 as Italian, 190 as English, 172 as Vietnamese, 135 as Korean, 133 as Jewish, 129 as Serbian, 128 as Chinese, 105 as French, 101 as Bulgarian, 100 as Irish, 100 as Austrian, 93 as Croatian, 78 as Canadian, 67 as Romanian, 54 as Greek, 48 as Turkish, 46 as Albanian, 44 as Silesian and 23 as Iranian.

Note on population: The difference values of population numbers in the table "Population statistic" and in the sections "Ethnicity" & "Religion" is caused by the use of various statistical methods.

=== Religion ===
Census 2021 (1+%)
Religion	Number	Fraction
Roman Catholic Church	454,957	65.78%
None	133,335	19.28%
Evangelical Church	54,399	7.87%
Not found out	31,338	4.53%
Total	691,613	

In year 2021 was 691,613 people by religion 454,957 from Roman Catholic Church, 133,335 from None, 54,399 from Evangelical Church, 31,338 from Not found out, 3890 from Greek Catholic Church, 2159 from Christian Congregations in Slovakia, 2117 from Ad hoc movements, 1780 from Other, 1500 from Other and not ascertained christian church, 1080 from Jehovah's Witnesses, 832 from Eastern Orthodox Church, 726 from Buddhism, 645 from Calvinist Church, 518 from Paganism and natural spirituality, 369 from United Methodist Church, 365 from Islam, 290 from Baptists Church, 282 from Seventh-day Adventist Church, 225 from Apostolic Church, 224 from Church of the Brethren, 184 from Old Catholic Church, 112 from Hinduism, 110 from Jewish community, 95 from Czechoslovak Hussite Church, 59 from Church of Jesus Christ of Latter-day Saints, 16 from Bahá'i Community and 6 from New Apostolic Church.

== Economy ==
From the stagnation in the 1990s the region now enjoys relative prosperity. The main employers are industry and tourism. The river Váh valley, which runs across the entire region, forms a strong industrial base with wood pulp and engineering factories as well as Volkswagen and Kia plants in Žilina and Martin.

== Politics ==
Current governor of Žilina region is Erika Jurinová (Slovakia Movement) - first woman in this office in Slovakia. She won with 32 %. In election 2022 was elected also to the regional parliament :

Regional Council of Žilina region

Type
- Type: Unicameral
- Houses: Regional Council

Leadership
- Governor: Erika Jurinová, Slovakia Movement

Structure
- Seats: 57
- Political groups: A just region (16) (Note: Independent (15) OĽaNO, NOVA, KÚ, ZZ, Chance, DS, ODS (1)) Voice (12) Christian Democrats (12) For our region (9) (Note: Independent (8) Direction (1)) Non-affiliated (8) (Note: Independent (4) Direction (1) SNS (1) Home (1) SaS, OKS, Let's try it differently (1))

Elections
- Last election: 29 October 2022

Meeting place
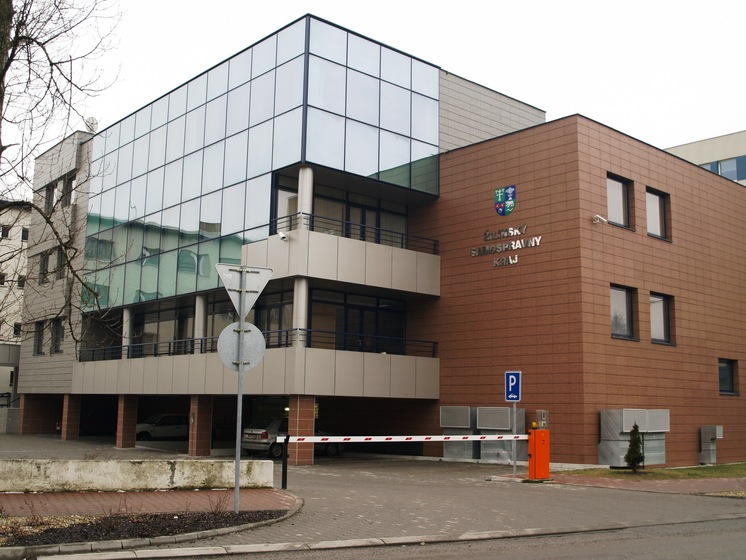
- Governor's office, Žilina

Website
- Council of Žilina region region

Political party	Seats won	Percentage
Independents	25 / 57	43.9 %
Centre-right coalition (Note: SaS, OKS, OĽaNO, NOVA, Christian Democratic Movement)	17 / 57	29.8 %
Smer-SD	10 / 57	17.5 %
SNS	5 / 57	8.8 %

Parliamentary groups were formed after the elections. Their status in August 2022 is as follows :

Political group	Seats	Status
Independents II	14 / 57	—
SaS, HS	9 / 57	Support
KDH	9 / 57	—
Smer-SD	6 / 57	—
Hlas-SD	5 / 57	—
Independents I	4 / 57	—
Independents III	4 / 57	—
Non-Inscrits	6 / 57	—

== Administrative divisions ==
The region is divided into 11 districts. There are 315 municipalities in the region of which 18 are towns.

District	Area [km^{2}]	Population
Bytča	281.51	31,511
Čadca	760.61	86,104
Dolný Kubín	491.83	38,608
Kysucké Nové Mesto	173.68	32,370
Liptovský Mikuláš	1340.99	70,995
Martin	735.63	92,401
Námestovo	690.45	64,935
Ružomberok	646.79	56,022
Turčianske Teplice	392.86	15,580
Tvrdošín	478.92	35,667
Žilina	815.08	159,997

Population and area values are current for year 2025.

== Places of interest ==
- Bytča with Bytča Castle and Marriage palace
- Čičmany: Village with special folk architecture
- Horná Orava Protected Landscape Area
- Kysuce Protected Landscape Area
- Low Tatras National Park
- Lesser Fatra National Park
- Museum of the Slovak Village in Martin, Museum of the Kysuce village in Nová Bystrica, Museum of the Orava village in Zuberec and Museum of the Liptov village in Pribylina
- Orava Castle
- Strážov Mountains Protected Landscape Area
- Tatra National Park - Western Tatras
- Towns in the Liptov region: Ružomberok, Liptovský Mikuláš and Liptovský Hrádok
- Demänovská Ice Cave
- Važecká Cave
- Greater Fatra National Park
- Vlkolínec near Ružomberok (UNESCO World Heritage Site)
- Wooden churches of the Slovak Carpathians - Wooden churches in Leštiny and Tvrdošín (UNESCO World Heritage Site)
- Žilina with Holy Trinity Cathedral, Church of Saint Stephen the King, Budatín Castle, etc.
- Stará Bystrica astronomical clock, the youngest astronomical clock in the world and the only in Slovakia. Located in the village of Stará Bystrica.

== Photo gallery ==
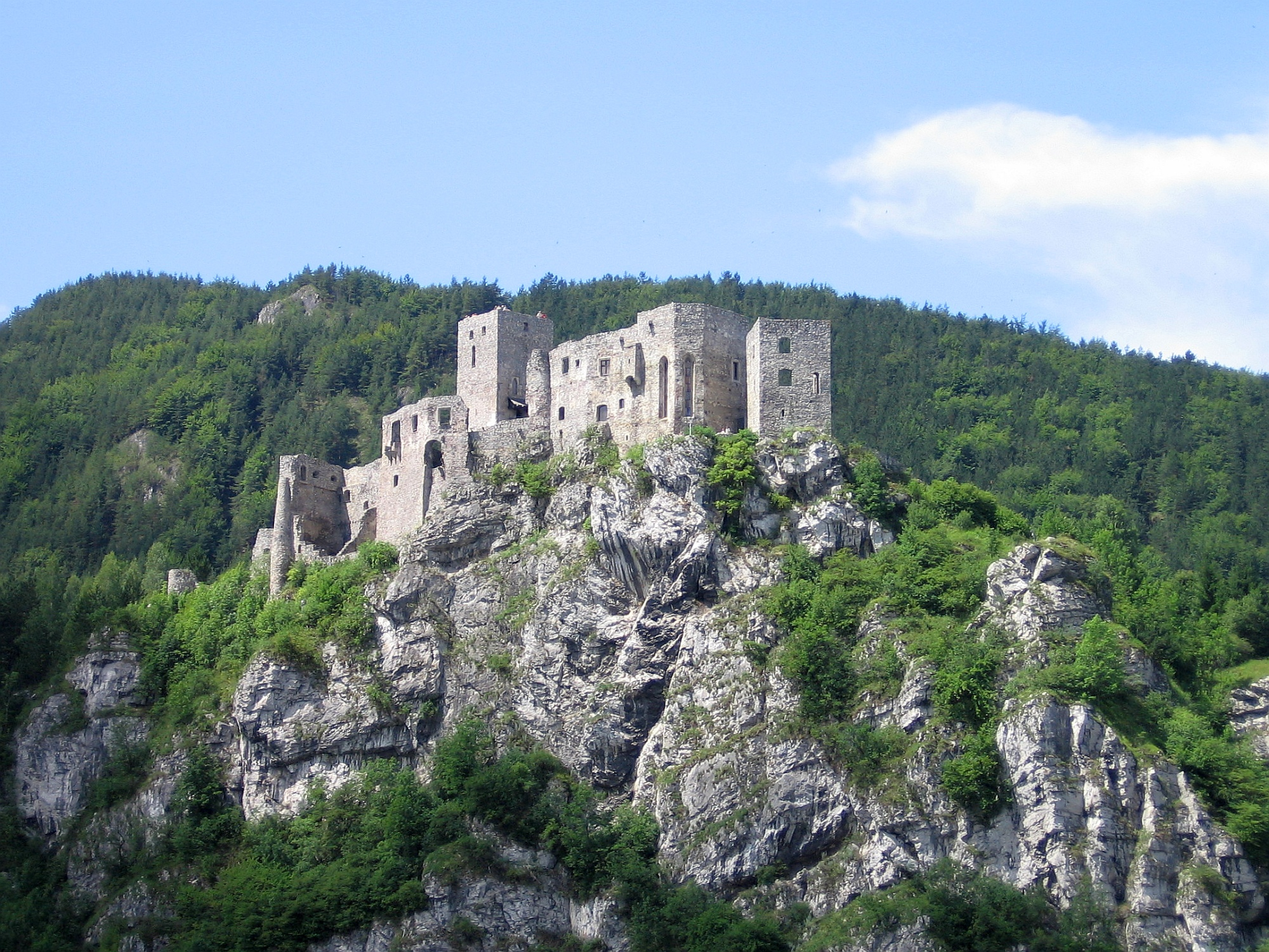
Strečno Castle

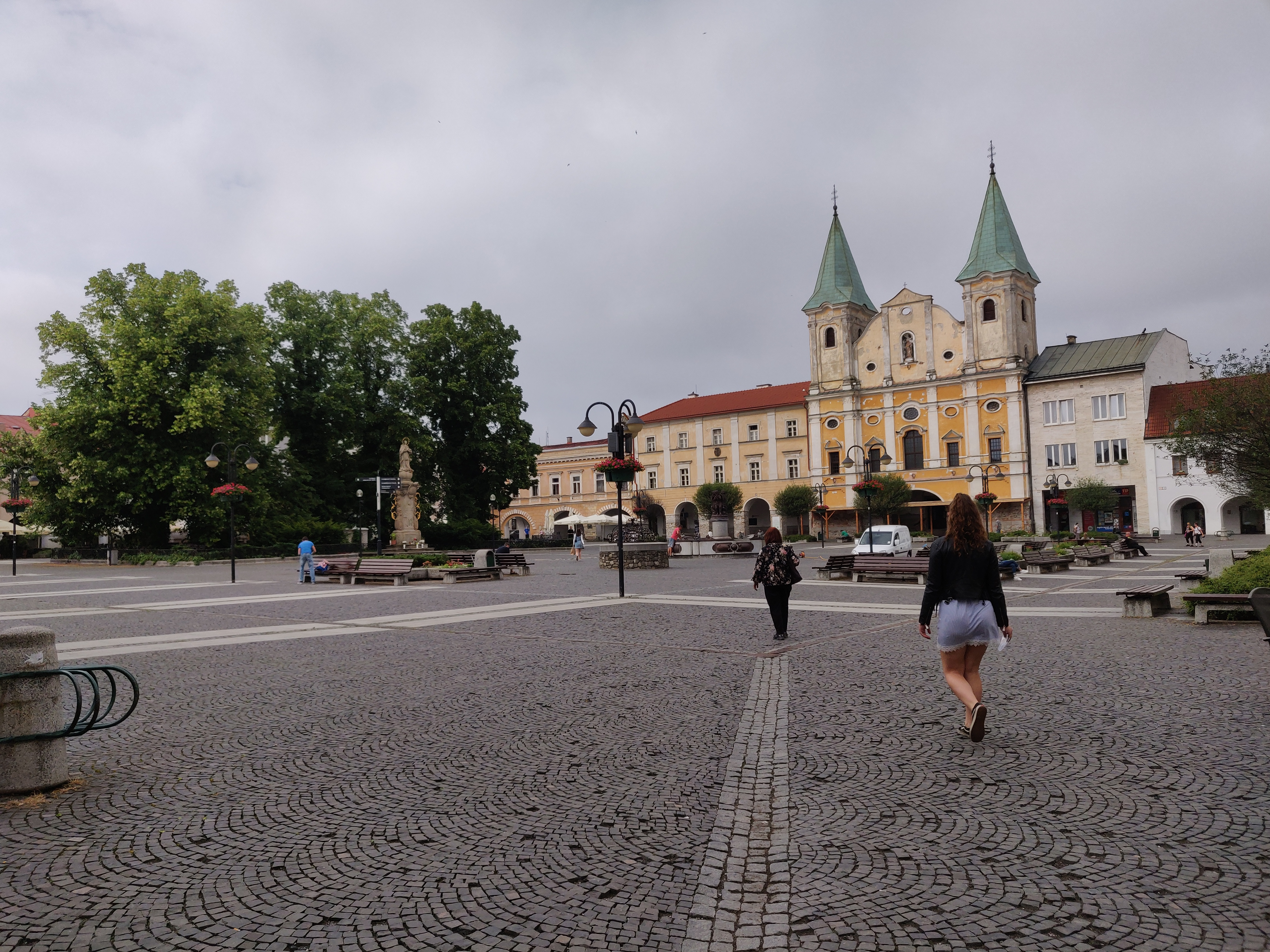
Žilina

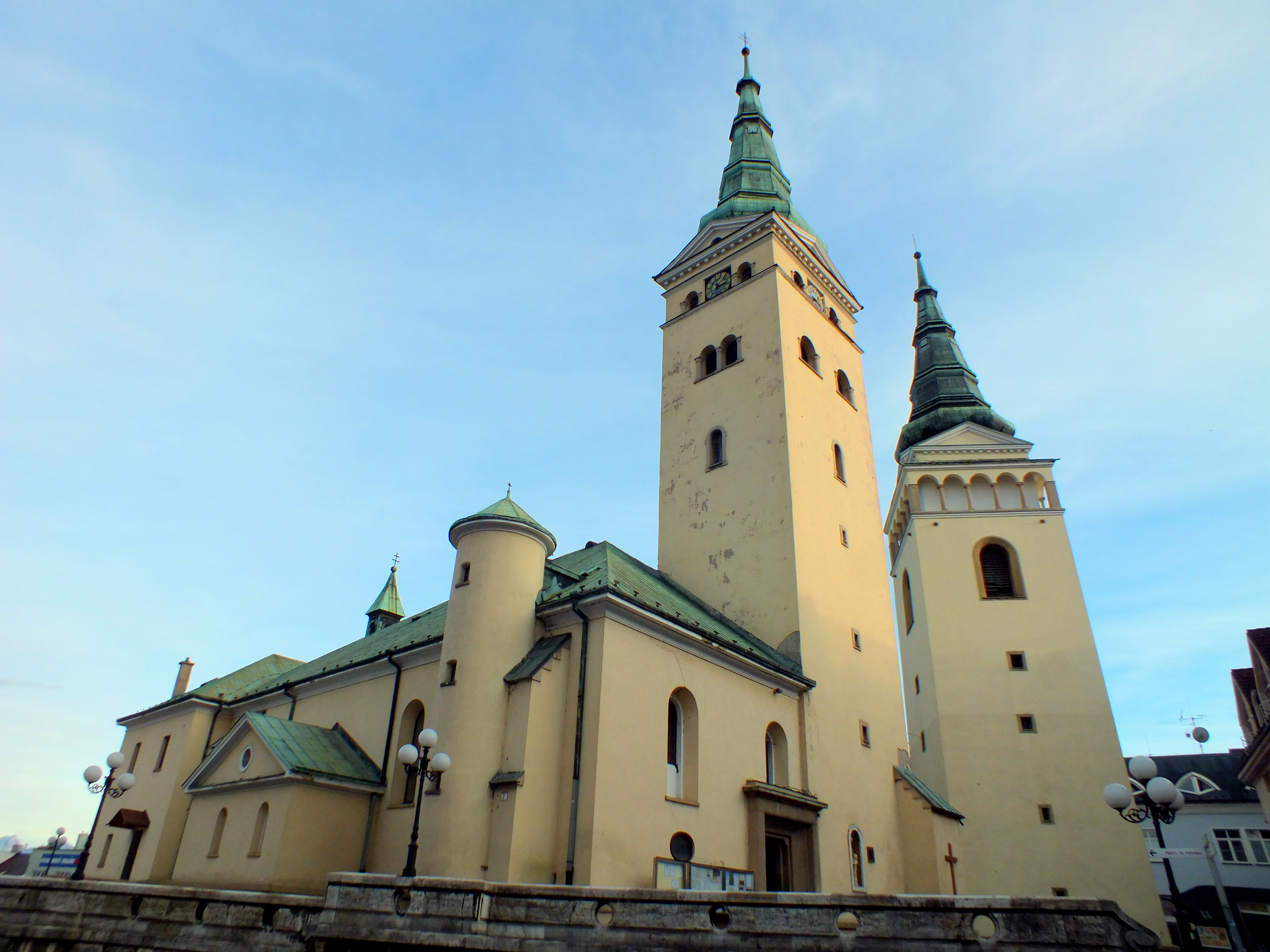
Holy Trinity Cathedral, Žilina

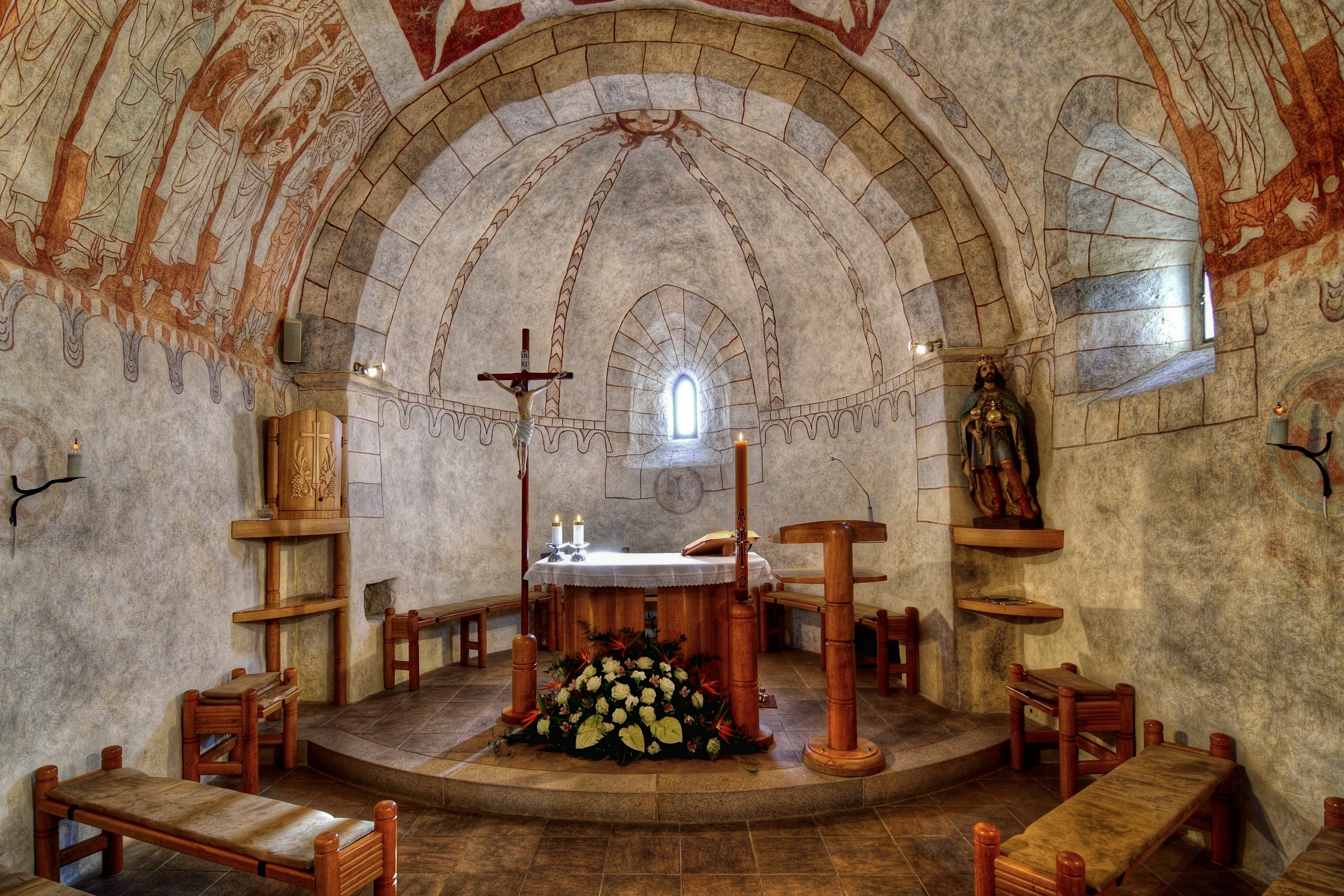
Church of Saint Stephen the King, Žilina

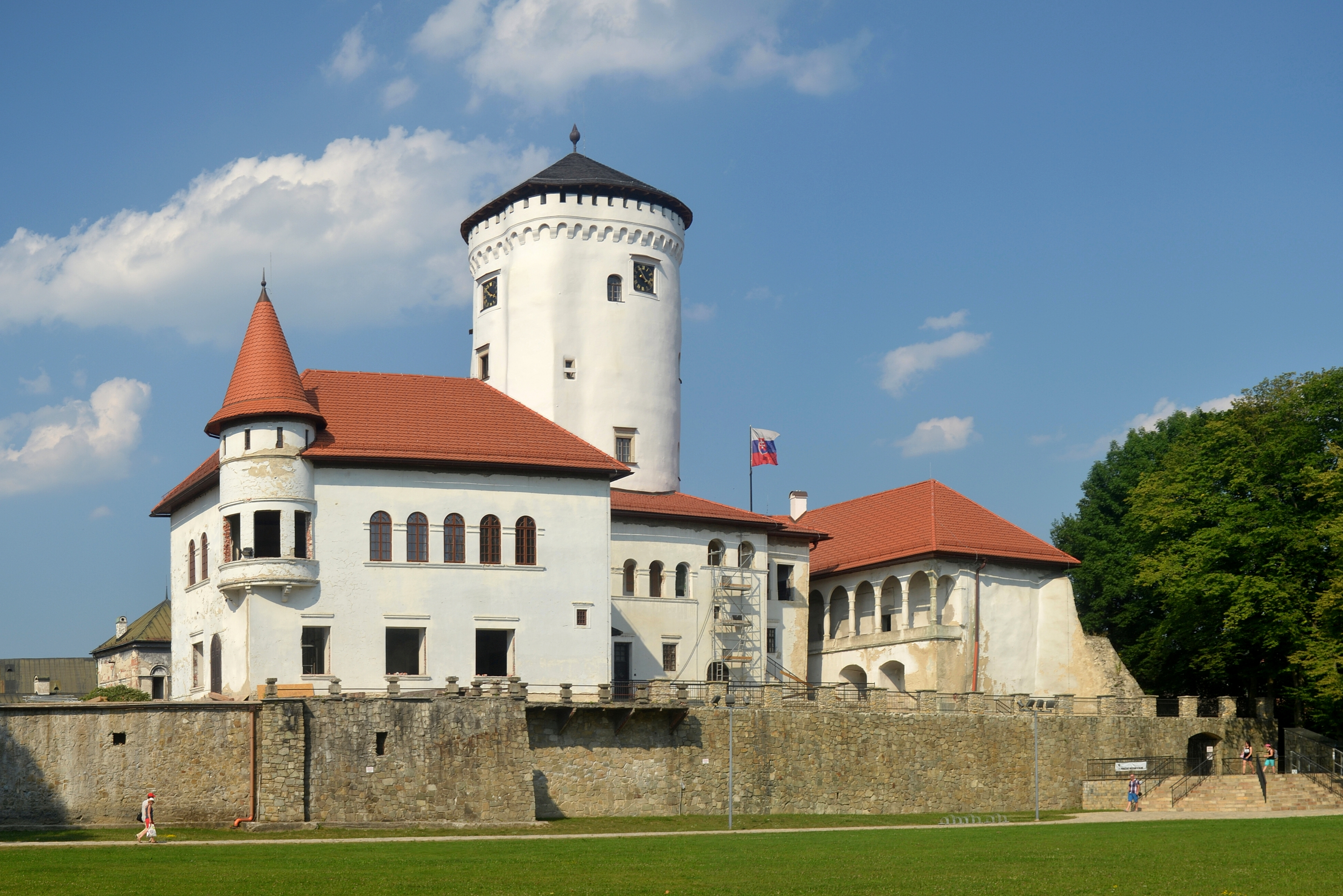
Budatín Castle, Žilina

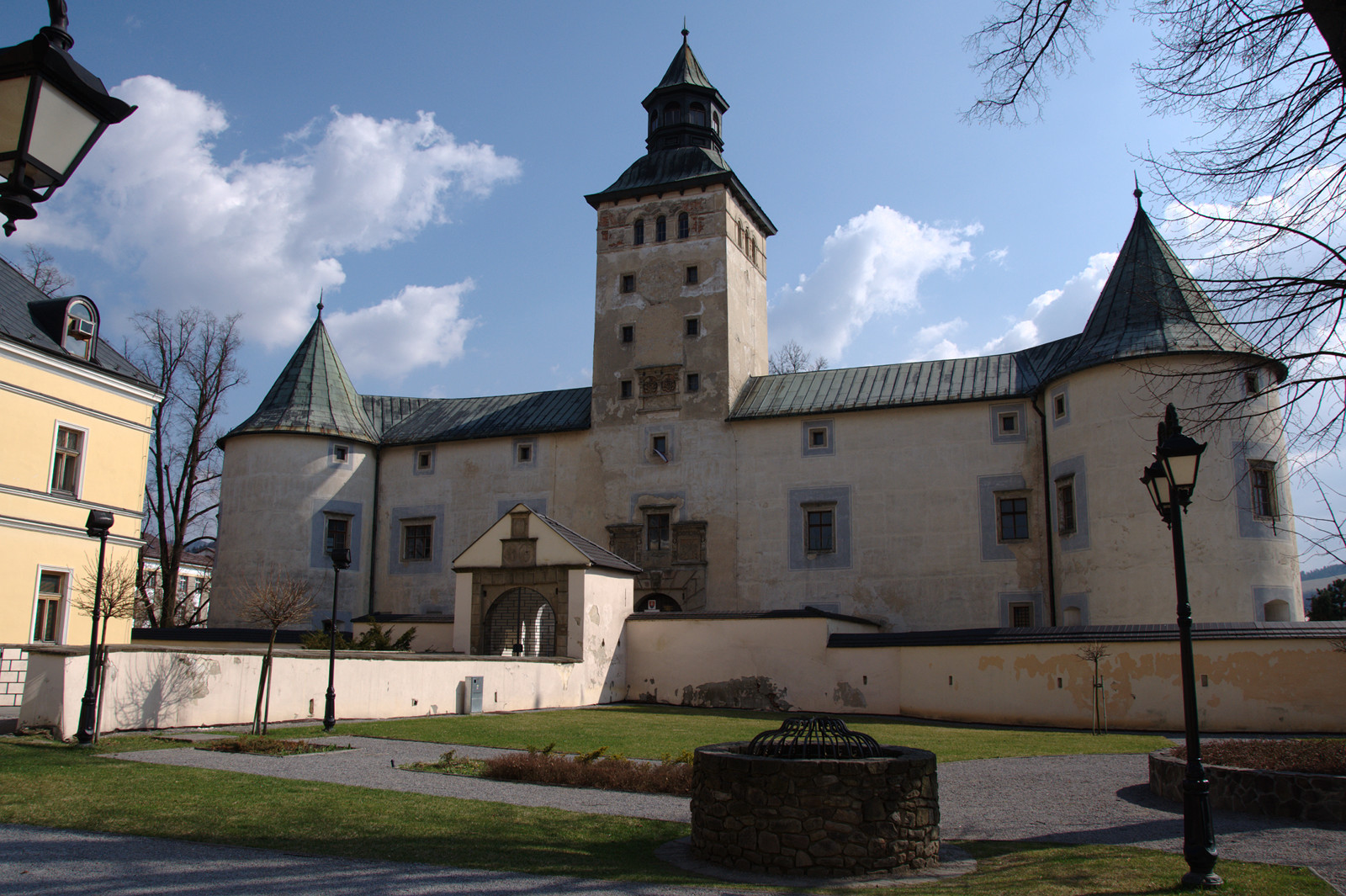
Bytča Castle, Bytča

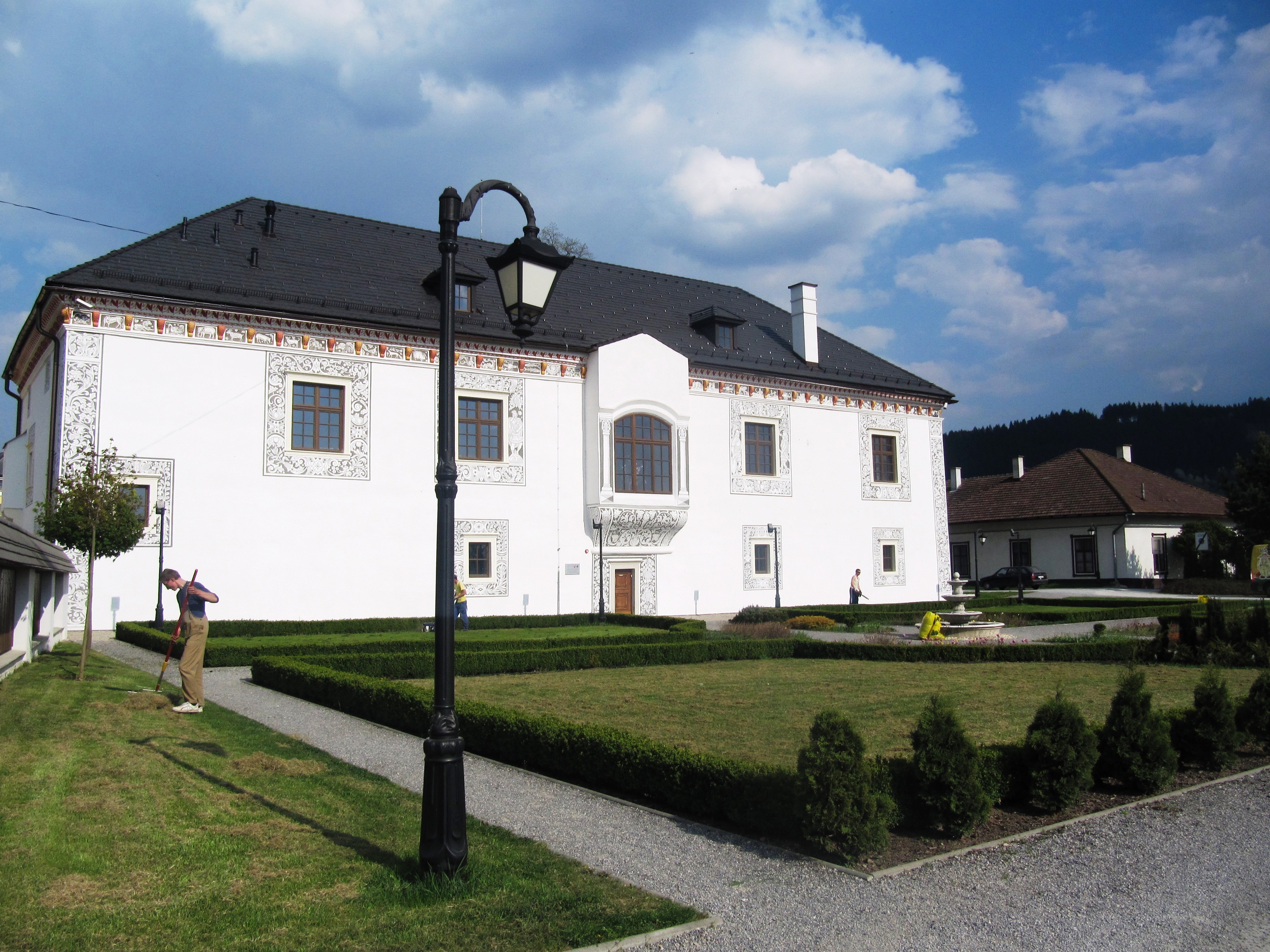
Marriage palace, Bytča

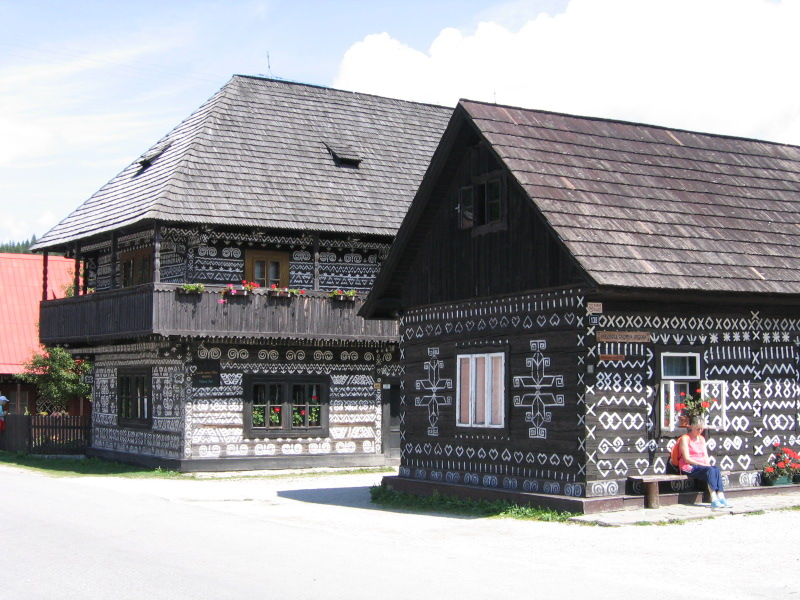
Čičmany

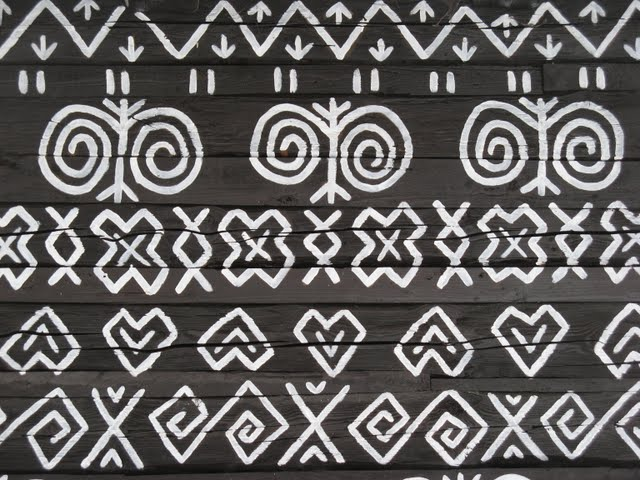
Typical ornaments of Čičmany

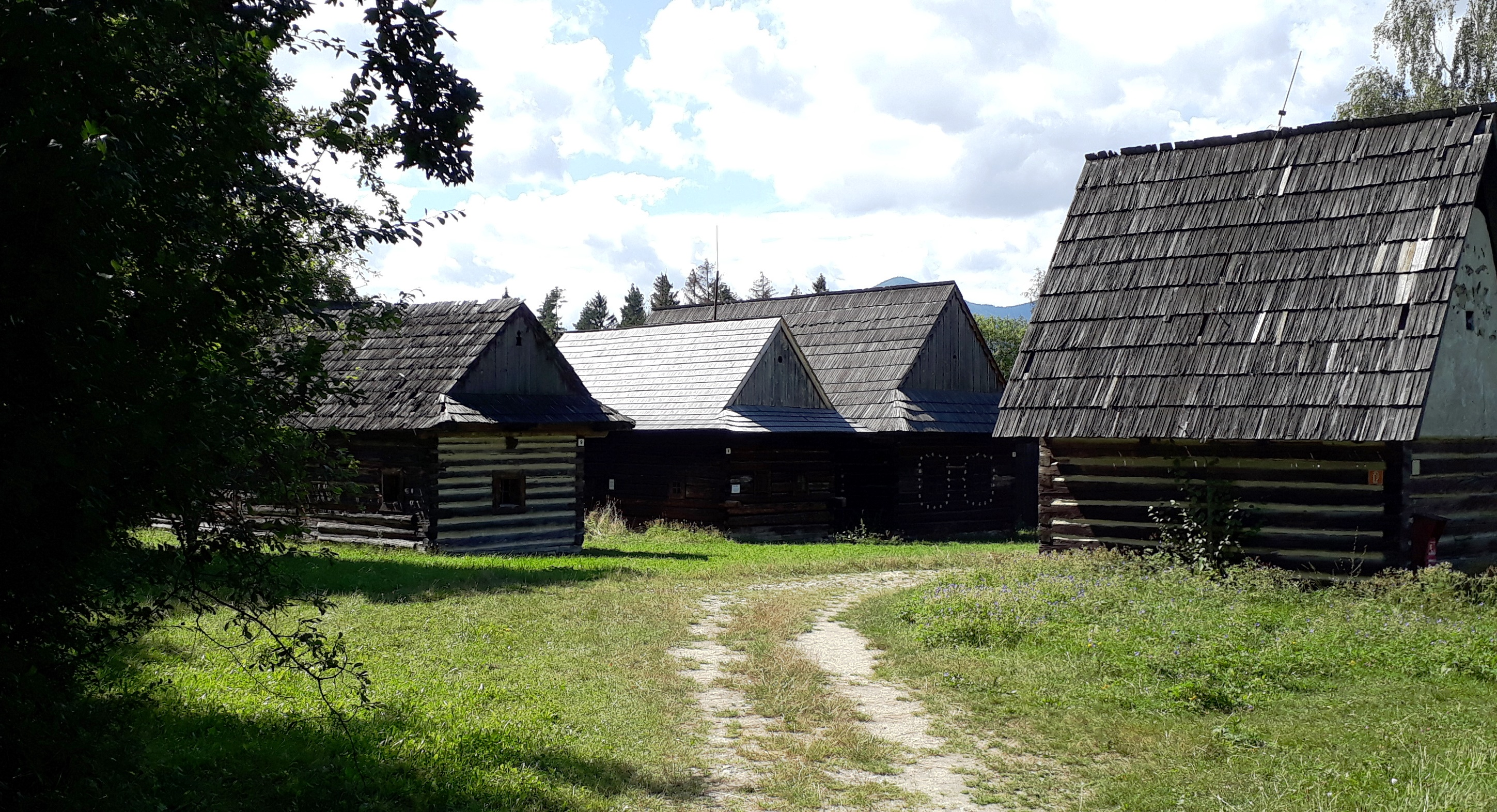
Museum of the Slovak village, Martin

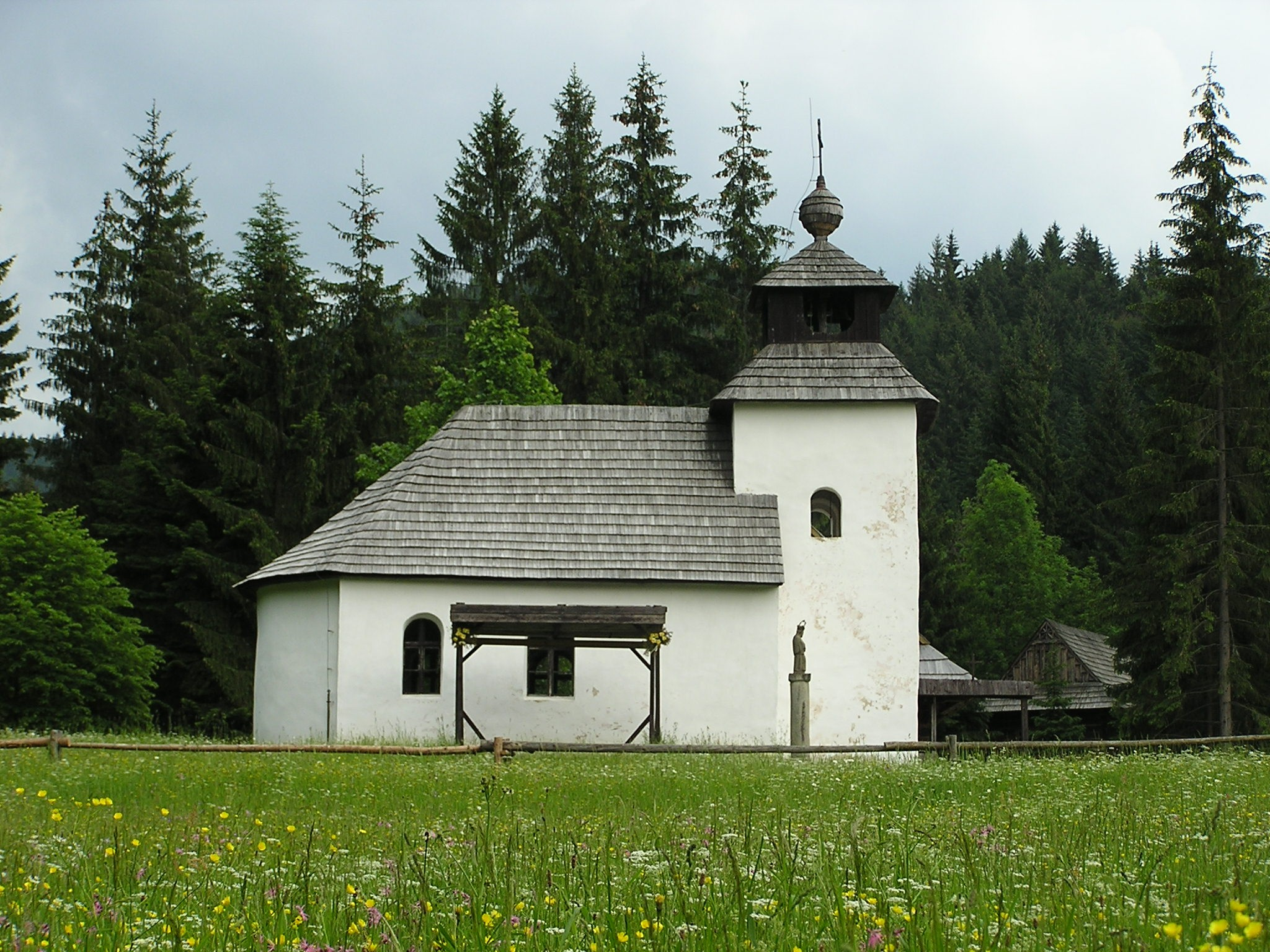
Museum of the Kysuce village, Nová Bystrica

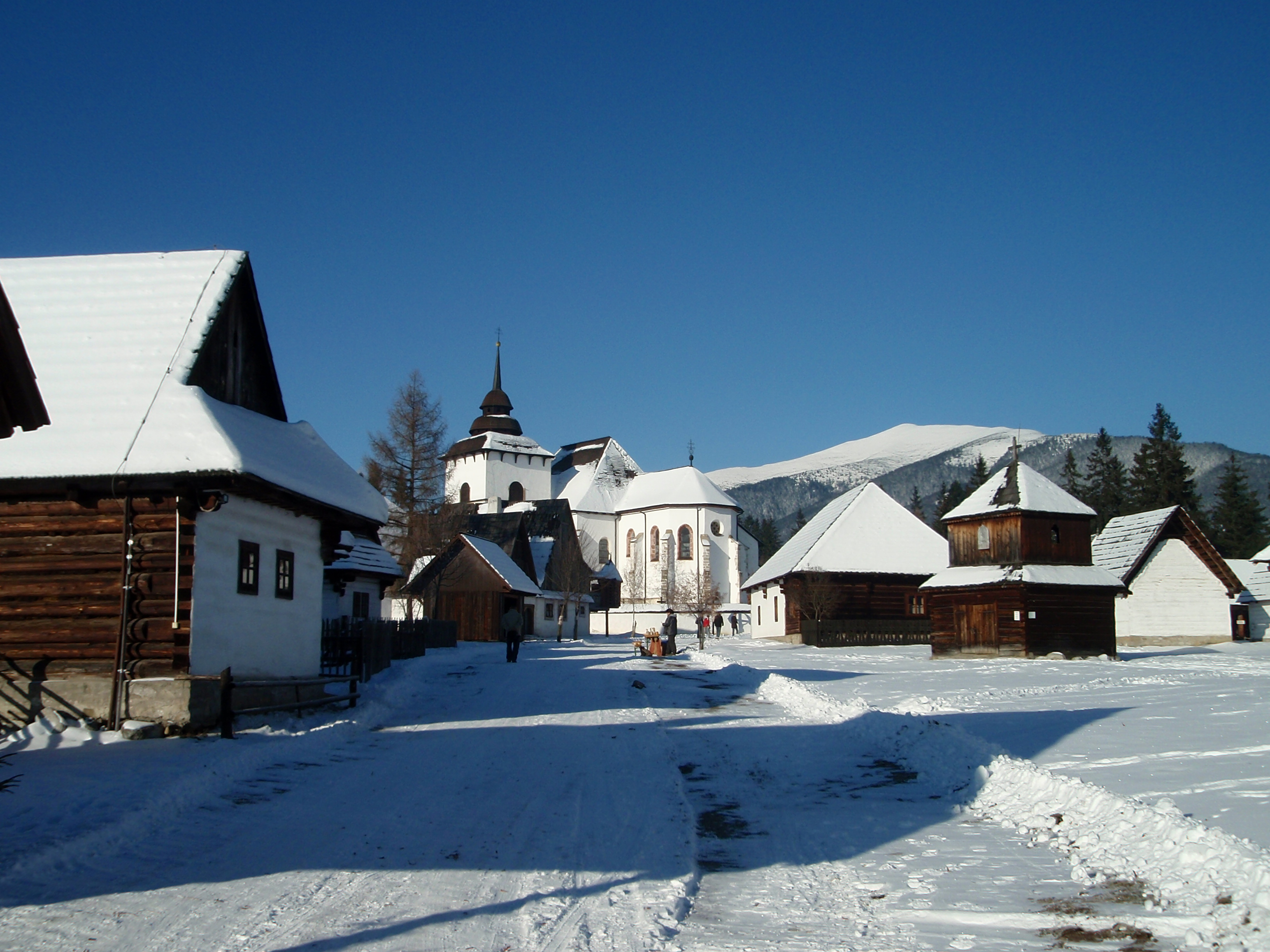
Museum of the Liptov village, Pribylina

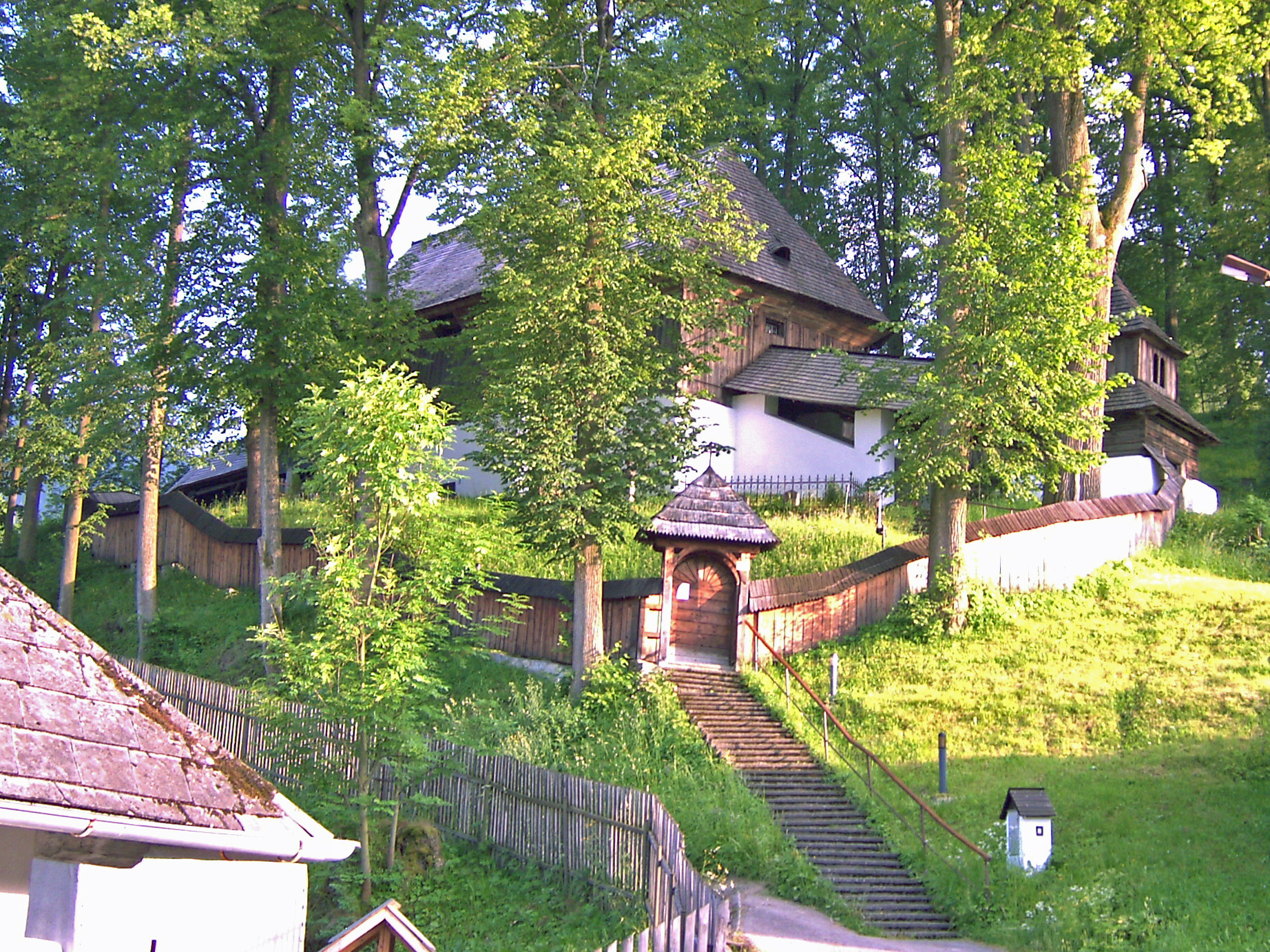
Wooden church in Leštiny (UNESCO World Heritage Site)

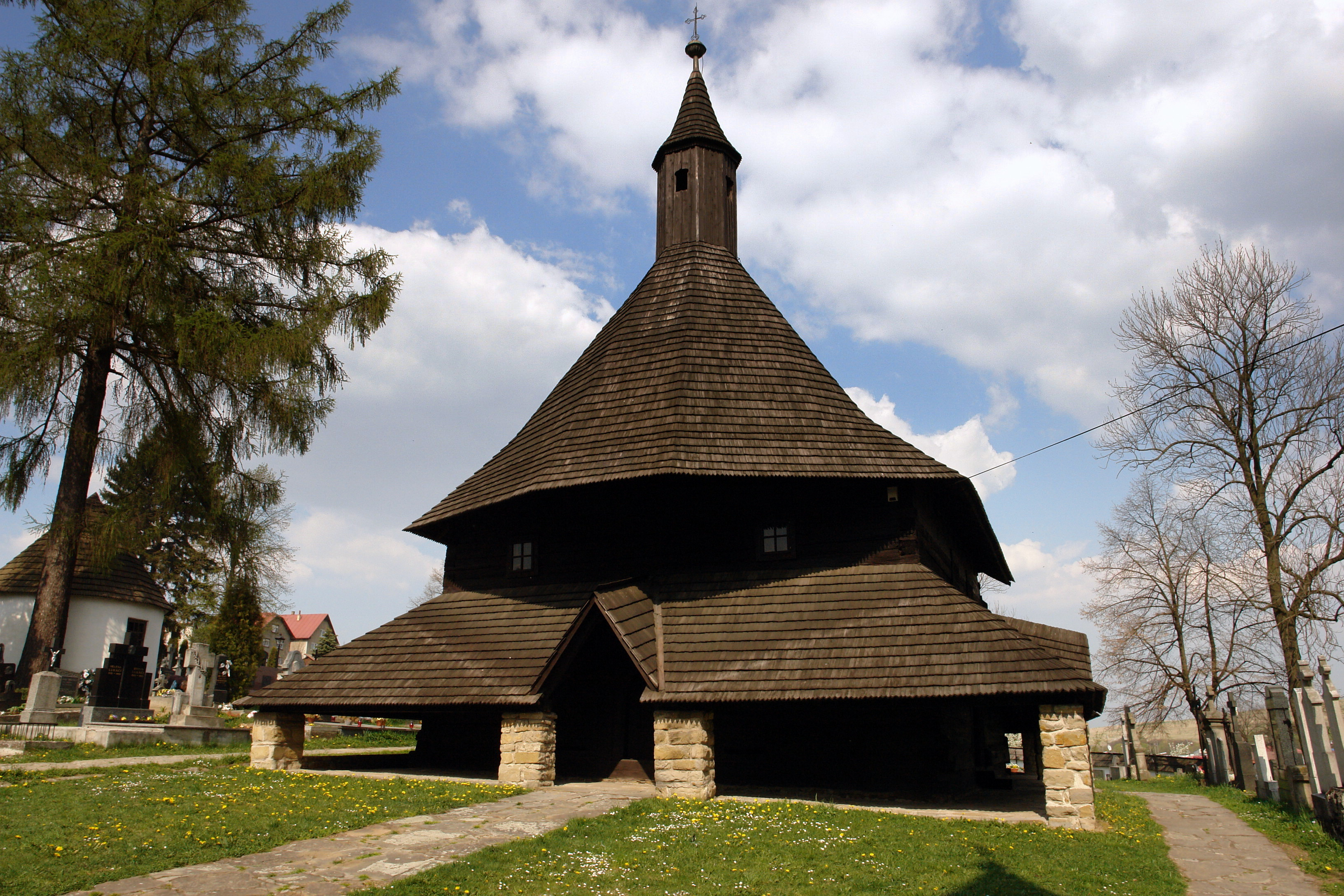
Wooden church in Tvrdošín (UNESCO World Heritage Site)

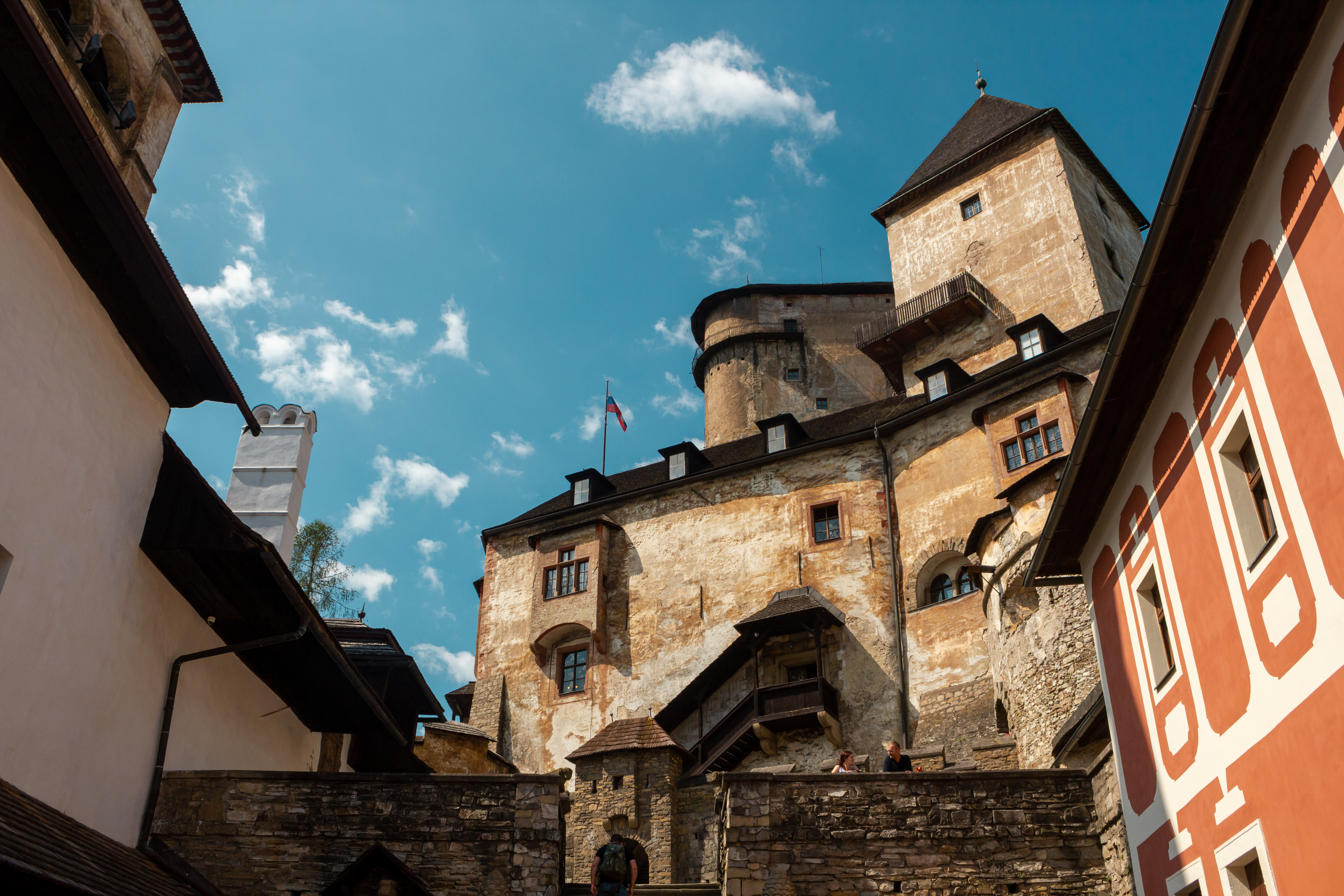
Orava Castle

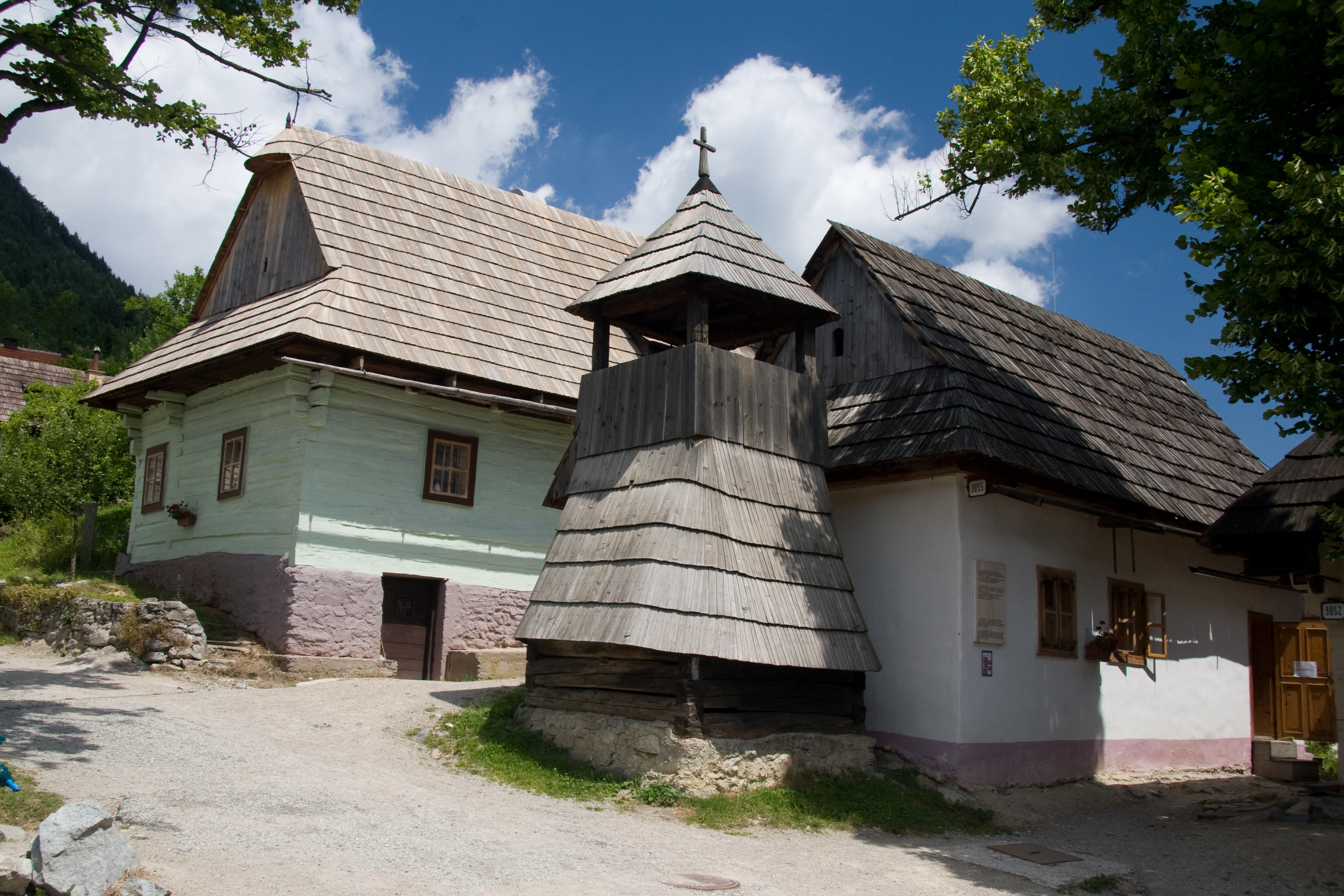
Vlkolínec (UNESCO World Heritage site)

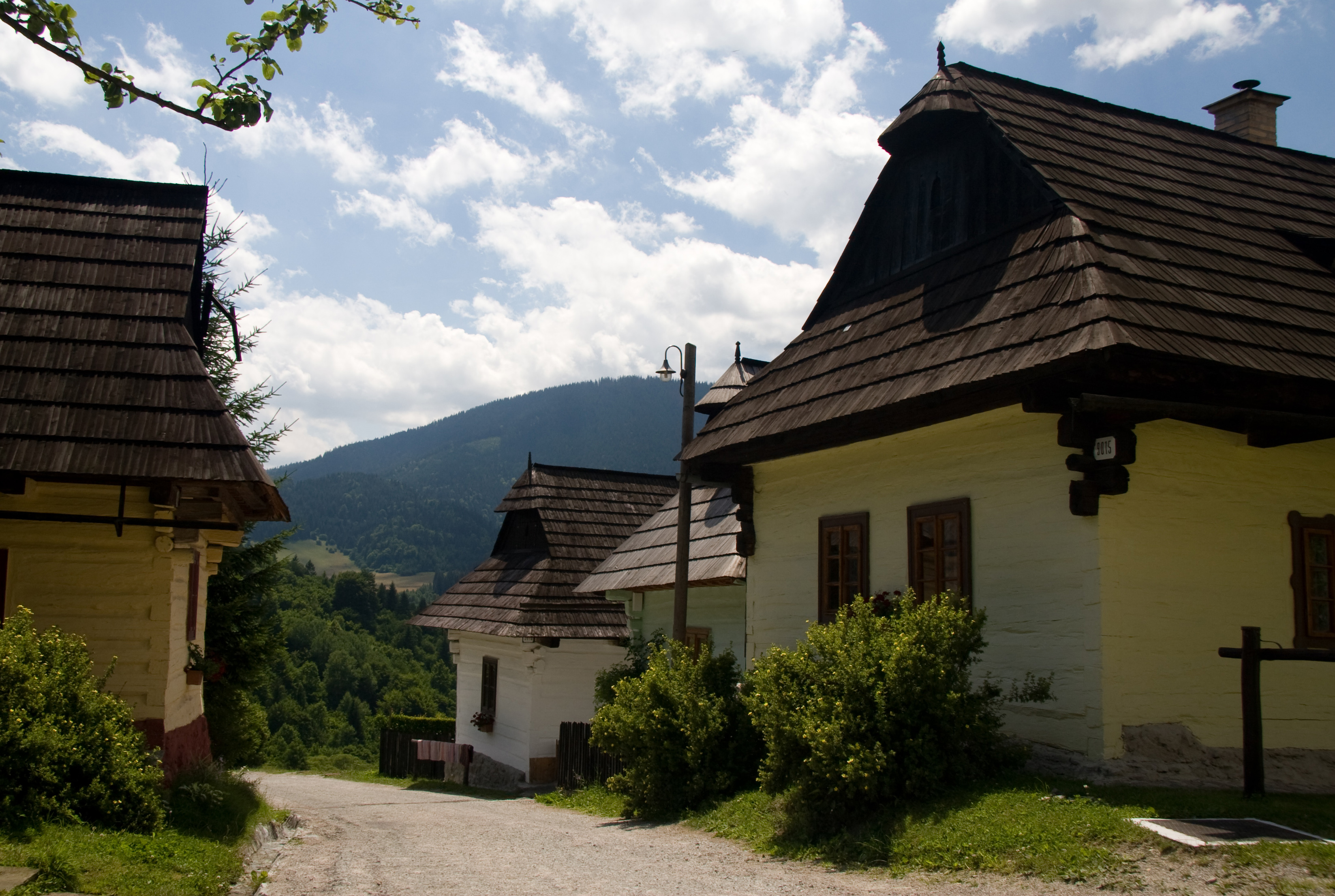
Street in Vlkolínec

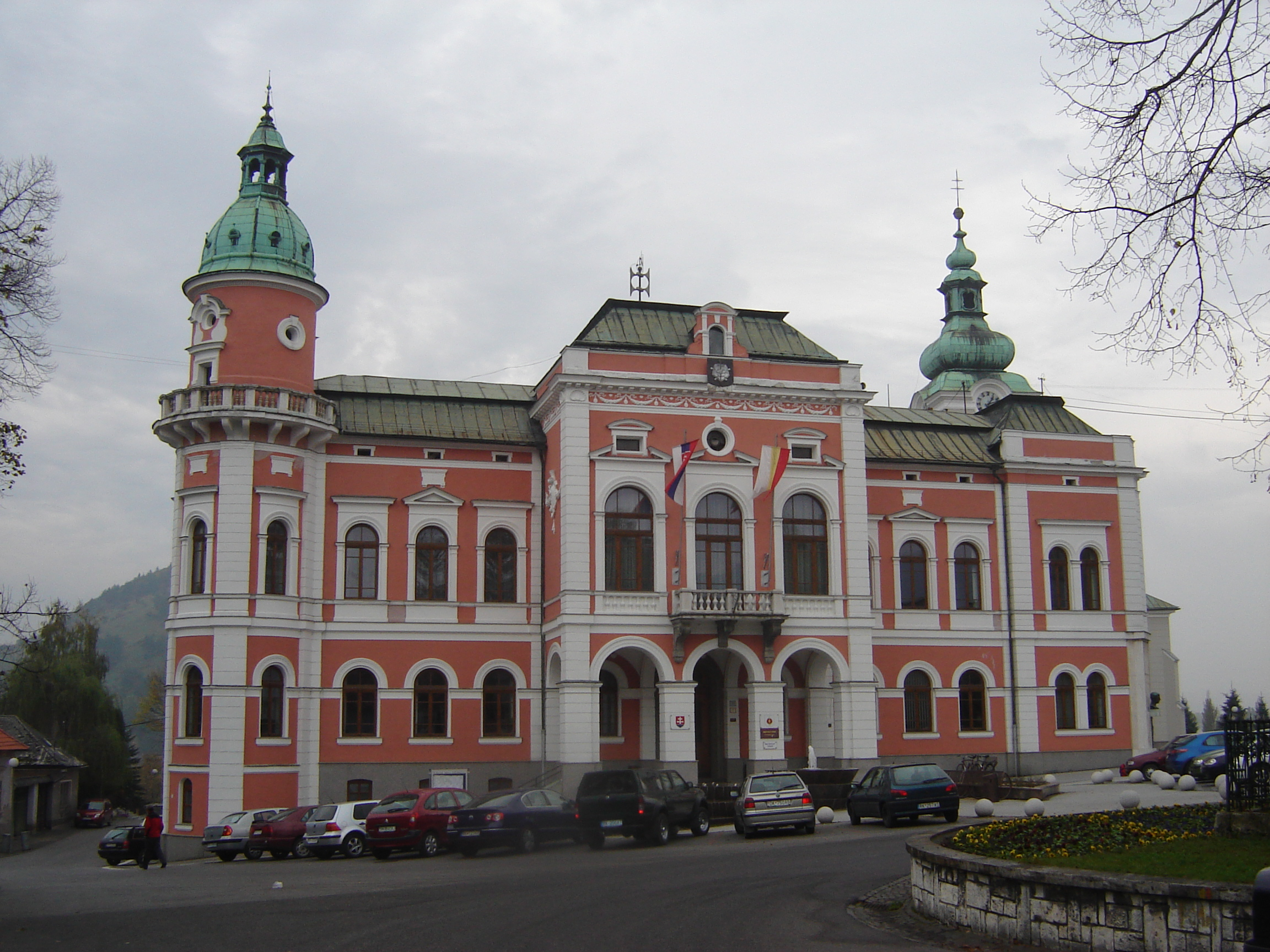
Ružomberok

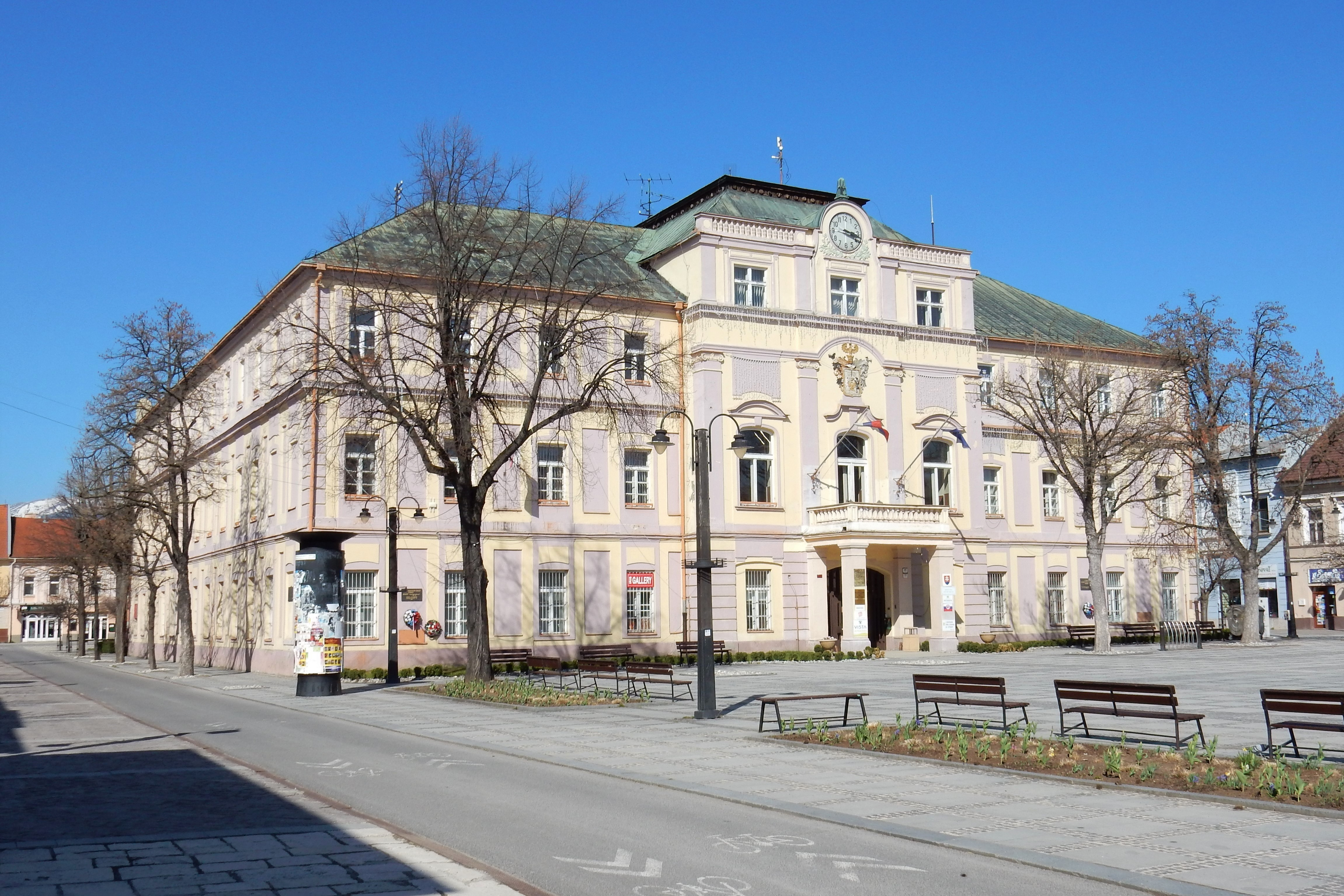
Liptovský Mikuláš

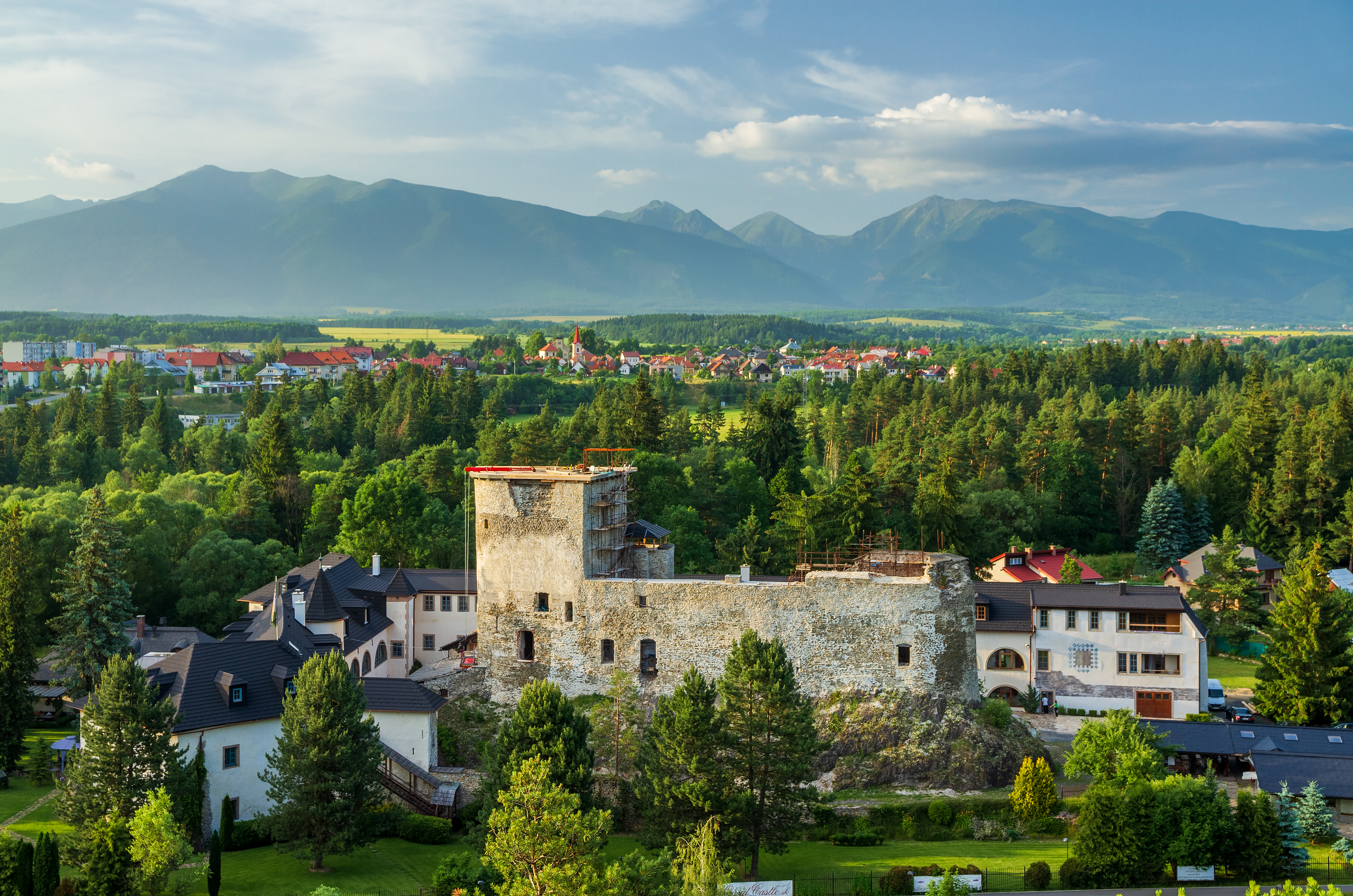
Liptovský Hrádok

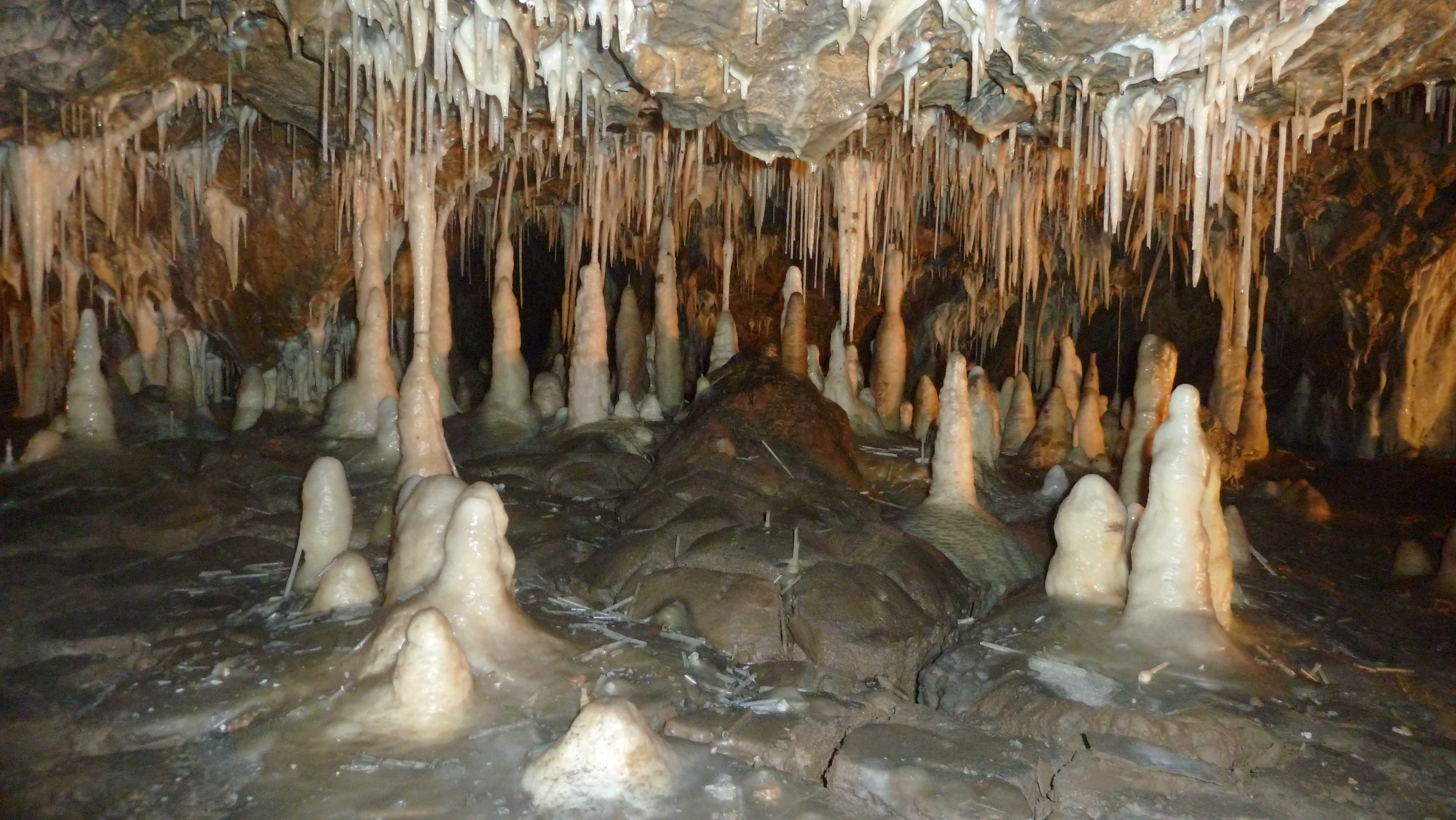
Važecká Cave, Važec

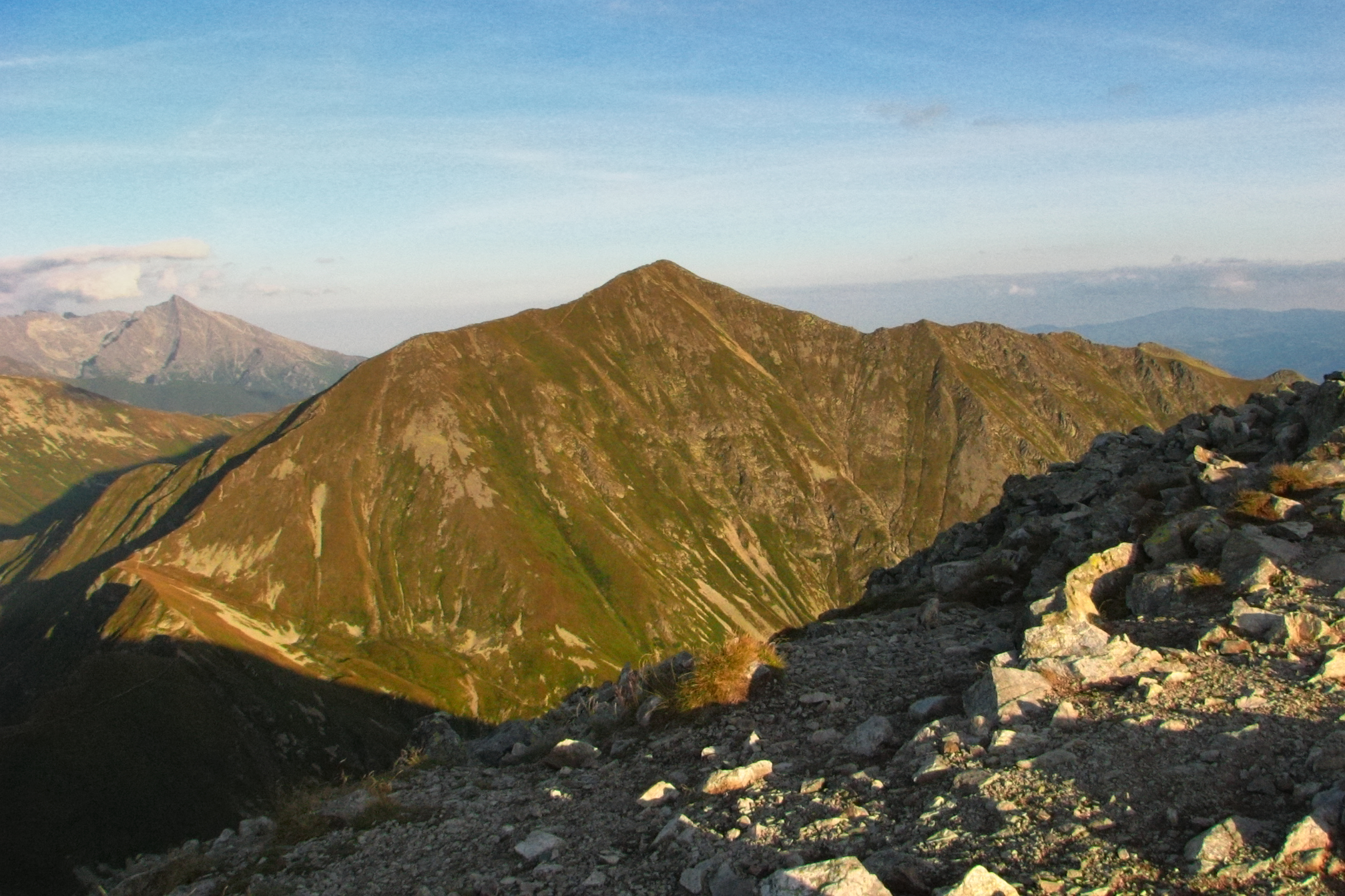
Tatra National Park - Western Tatras

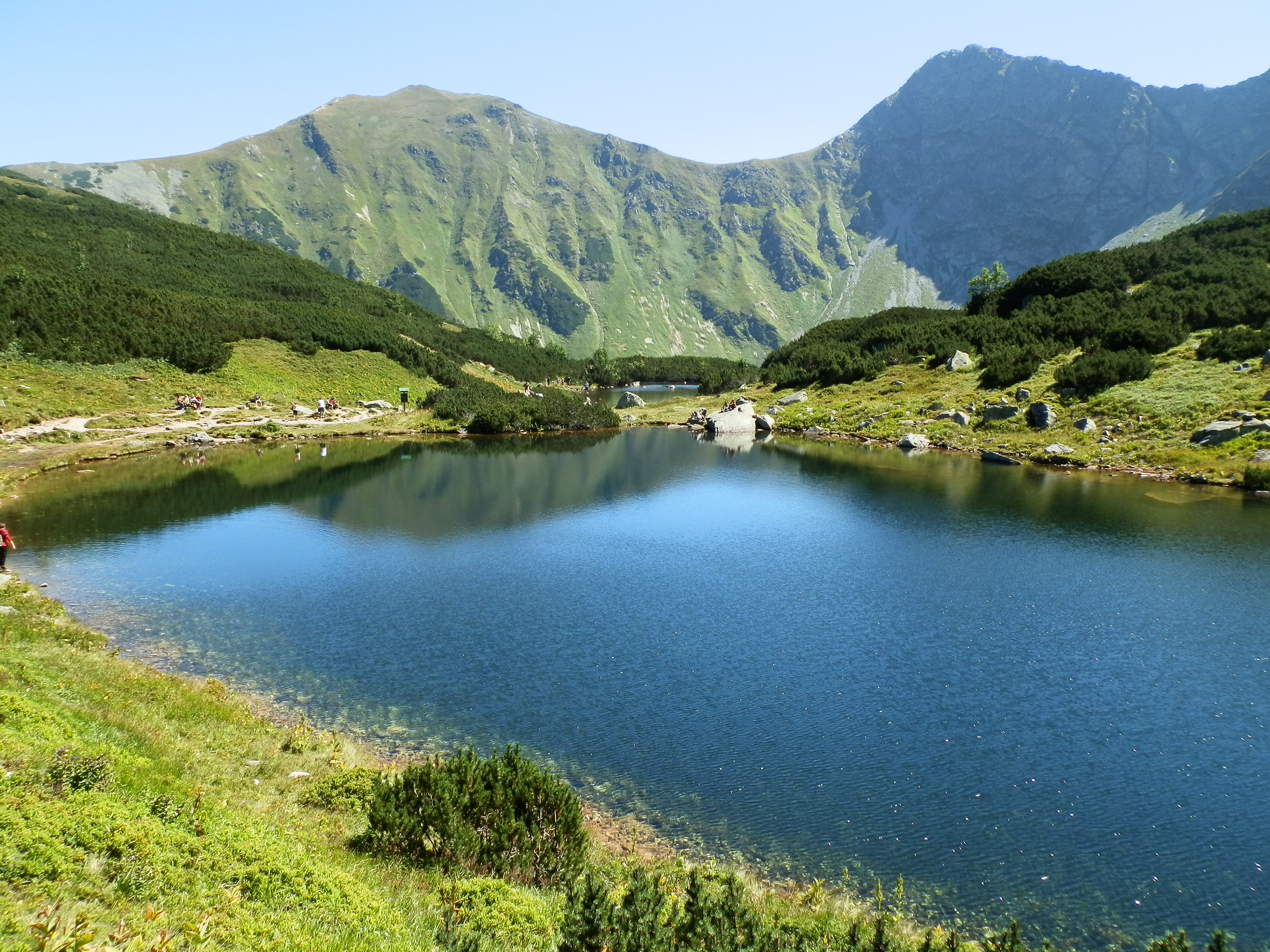
Roháčske tarns in Western Tatras

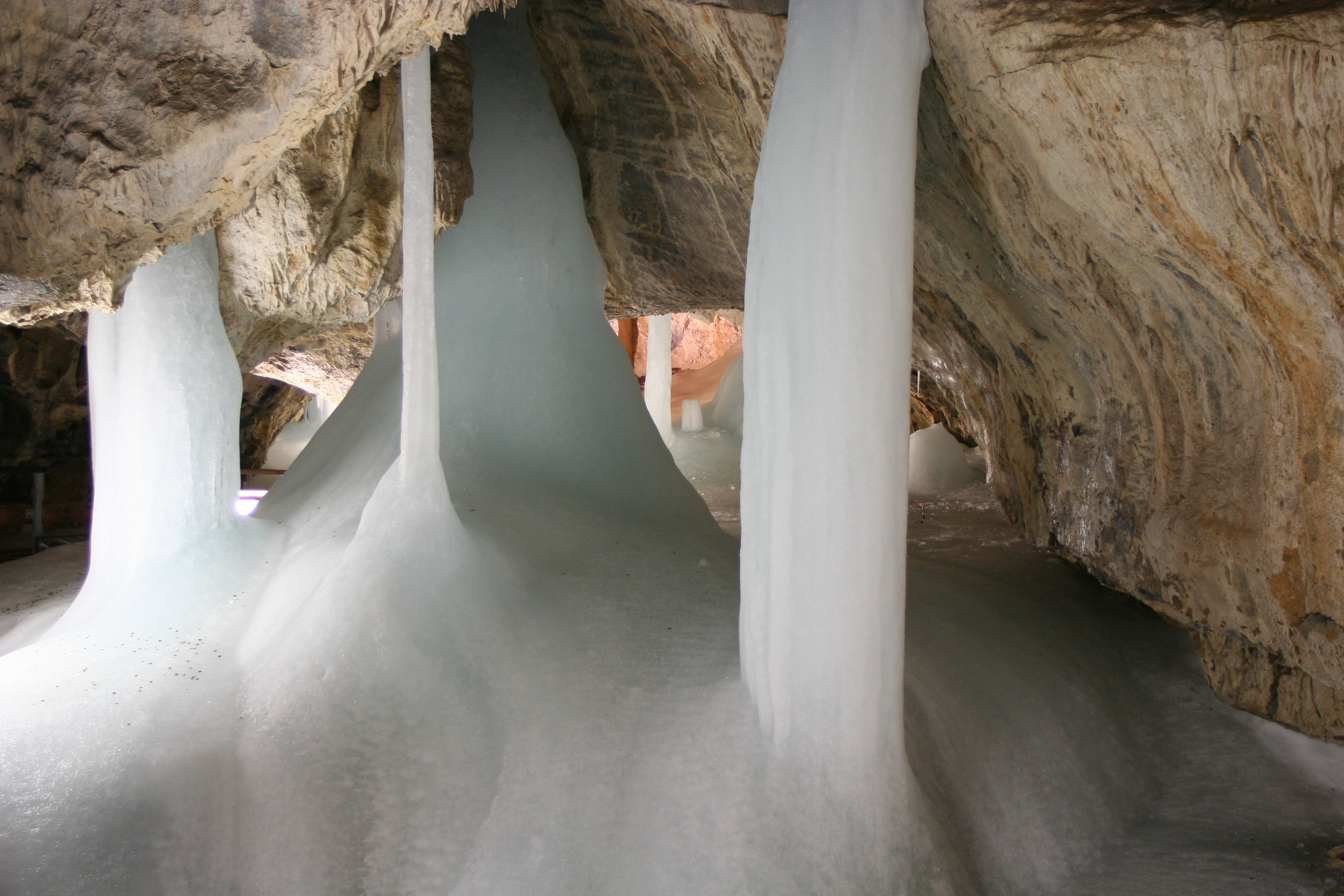
Demänovská Ice Cave

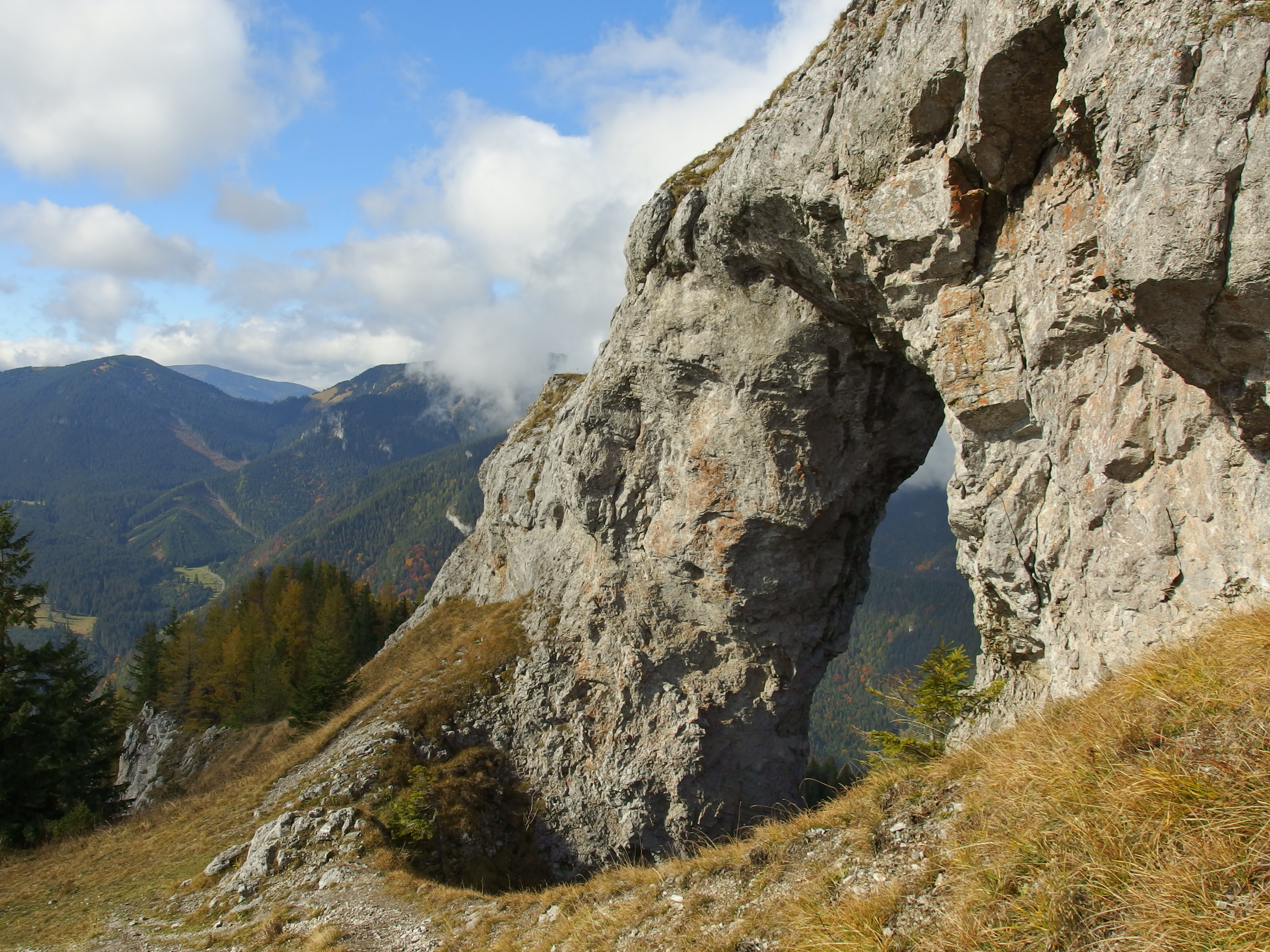
Low Tatras National Park

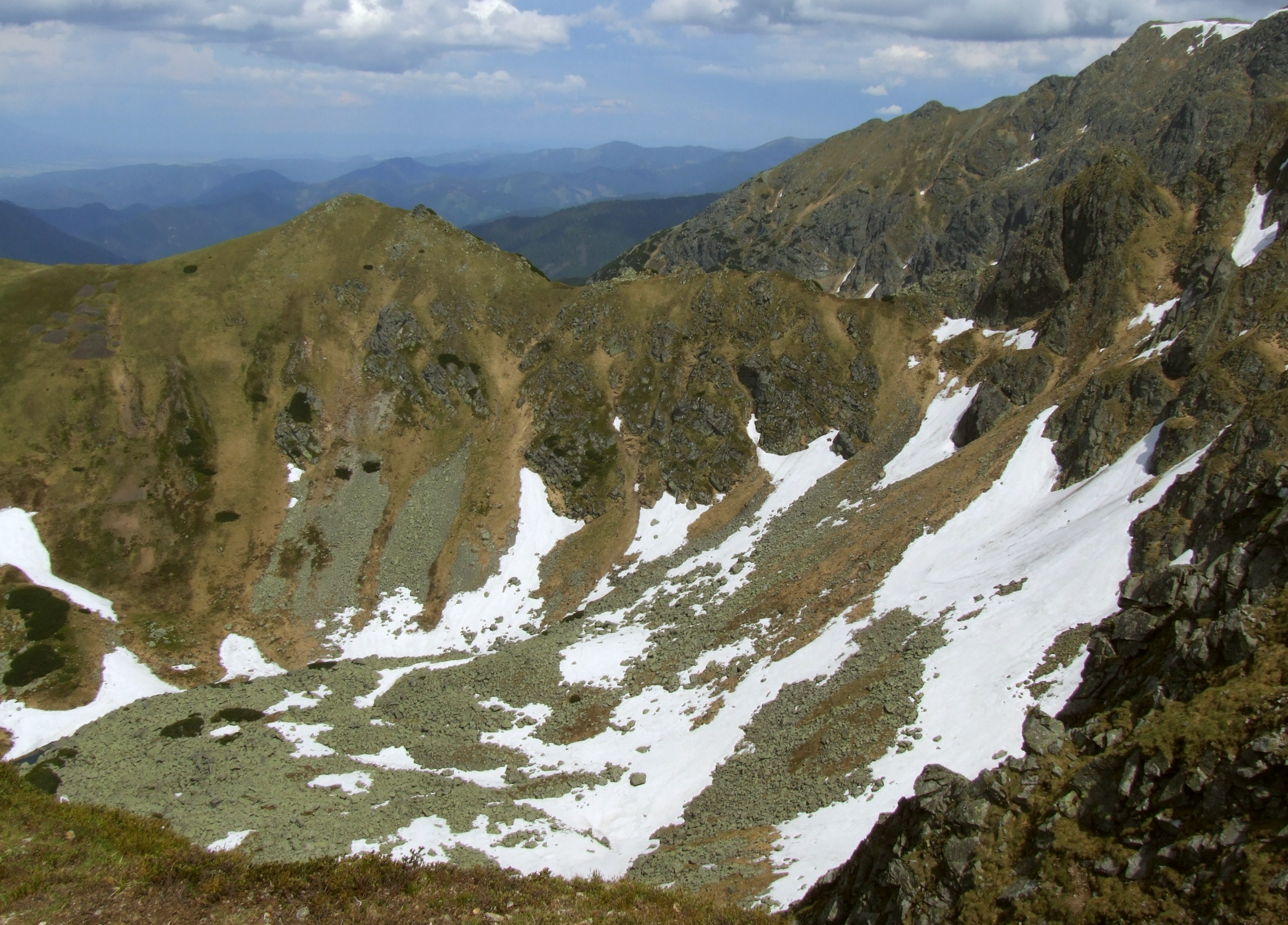
Low Tatras National Park

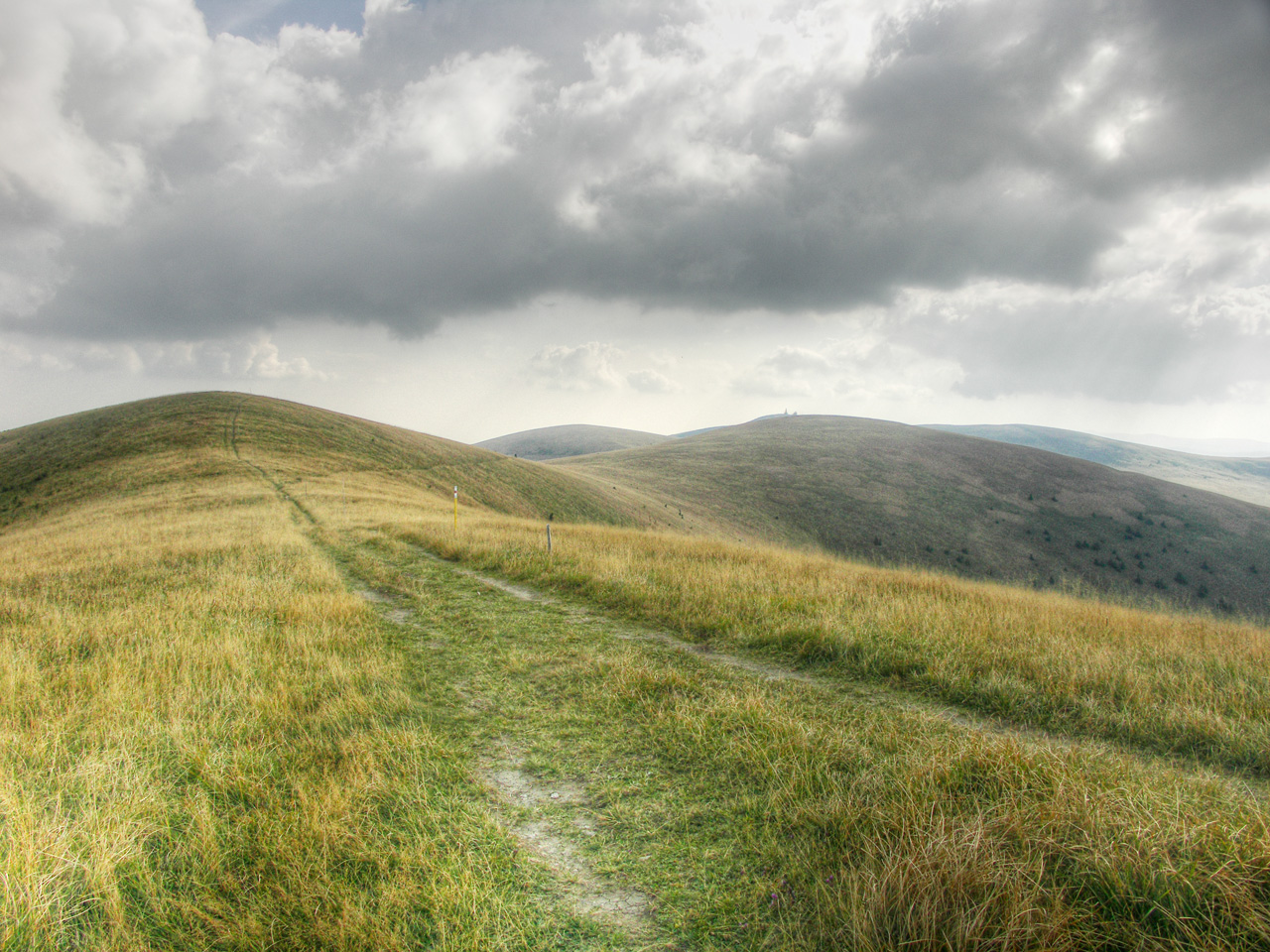
Greater Fatra National Park

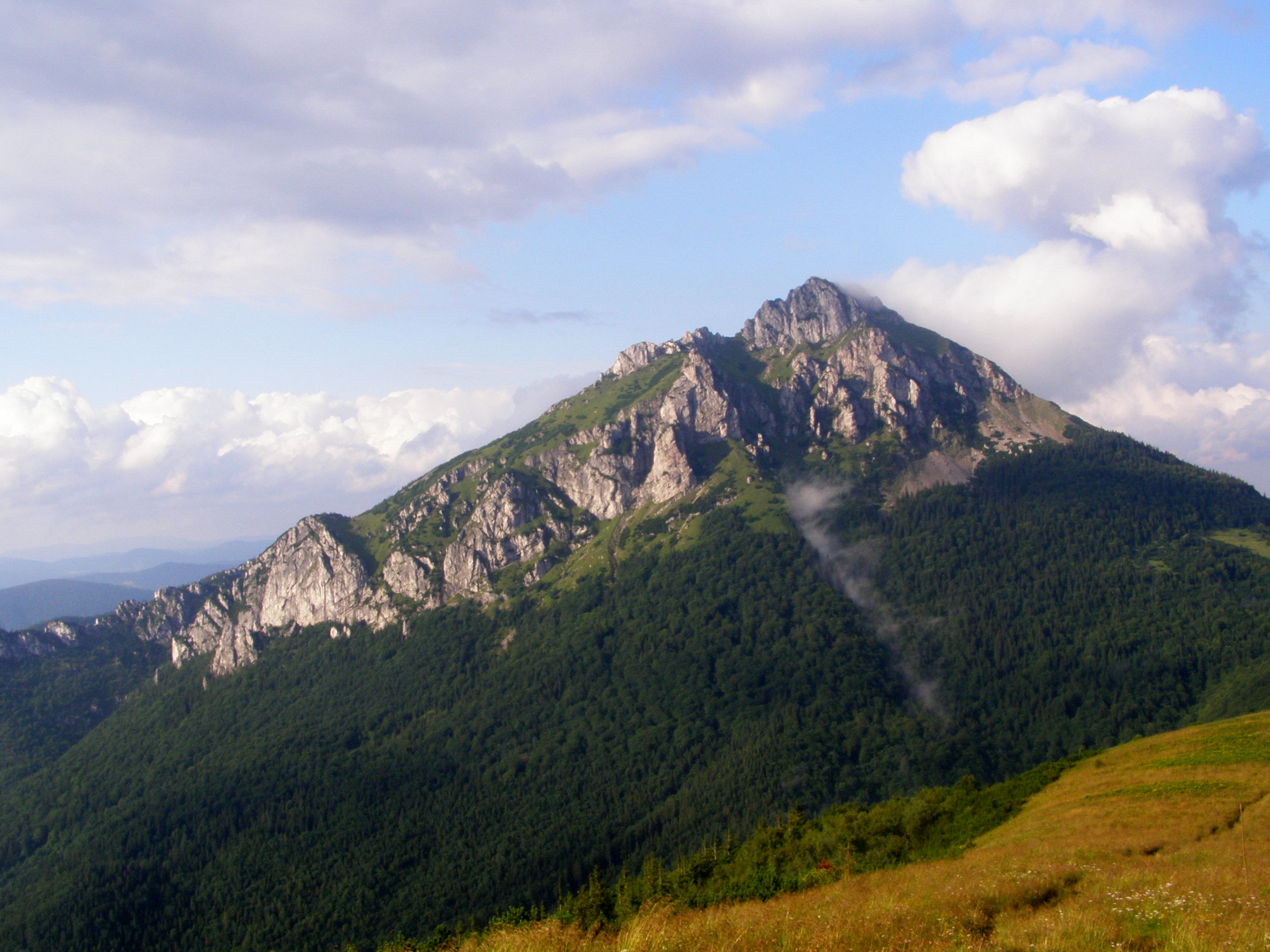
Lesser Fatra National Park

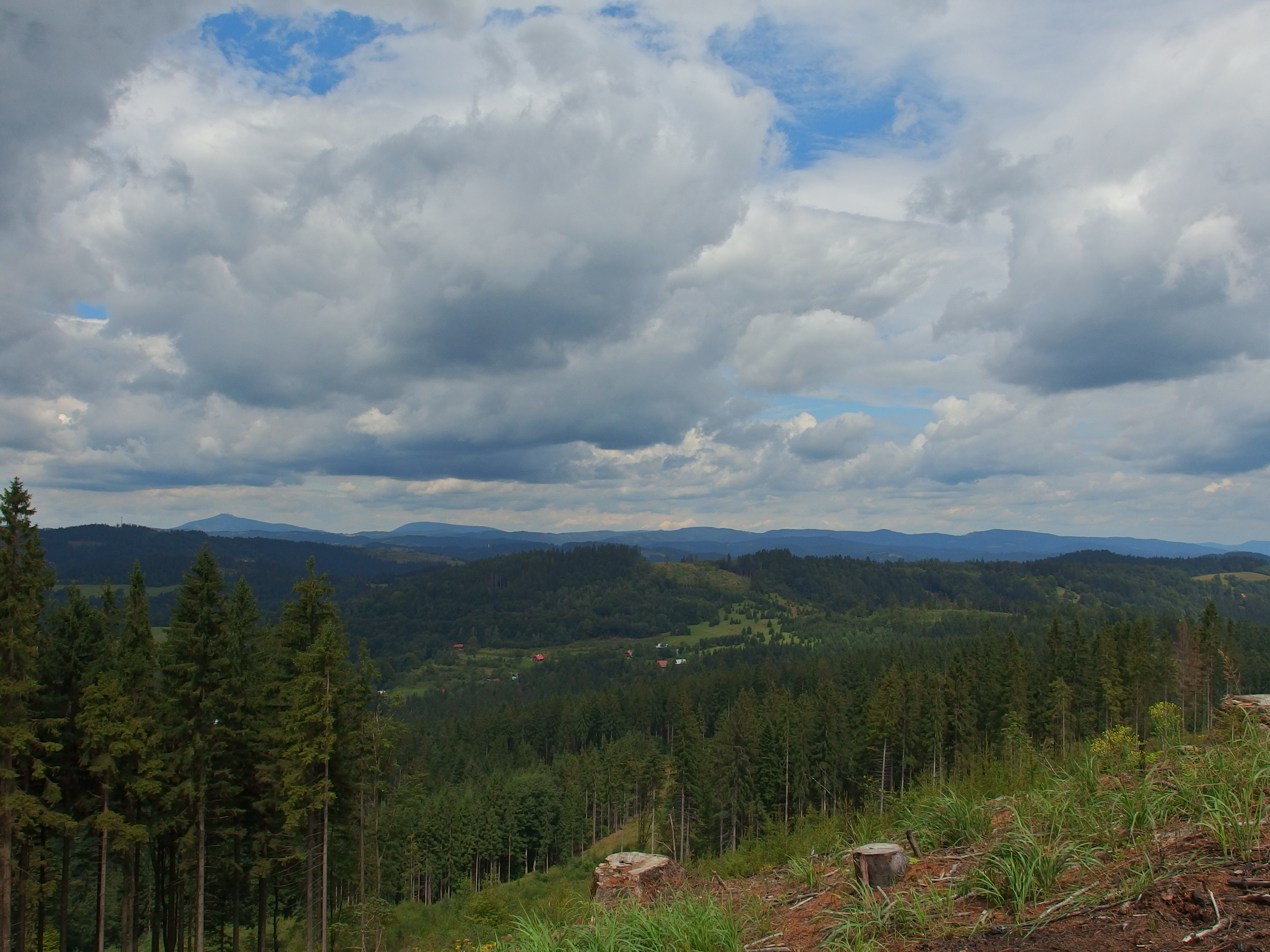
Kysuce Protected Landscape Area

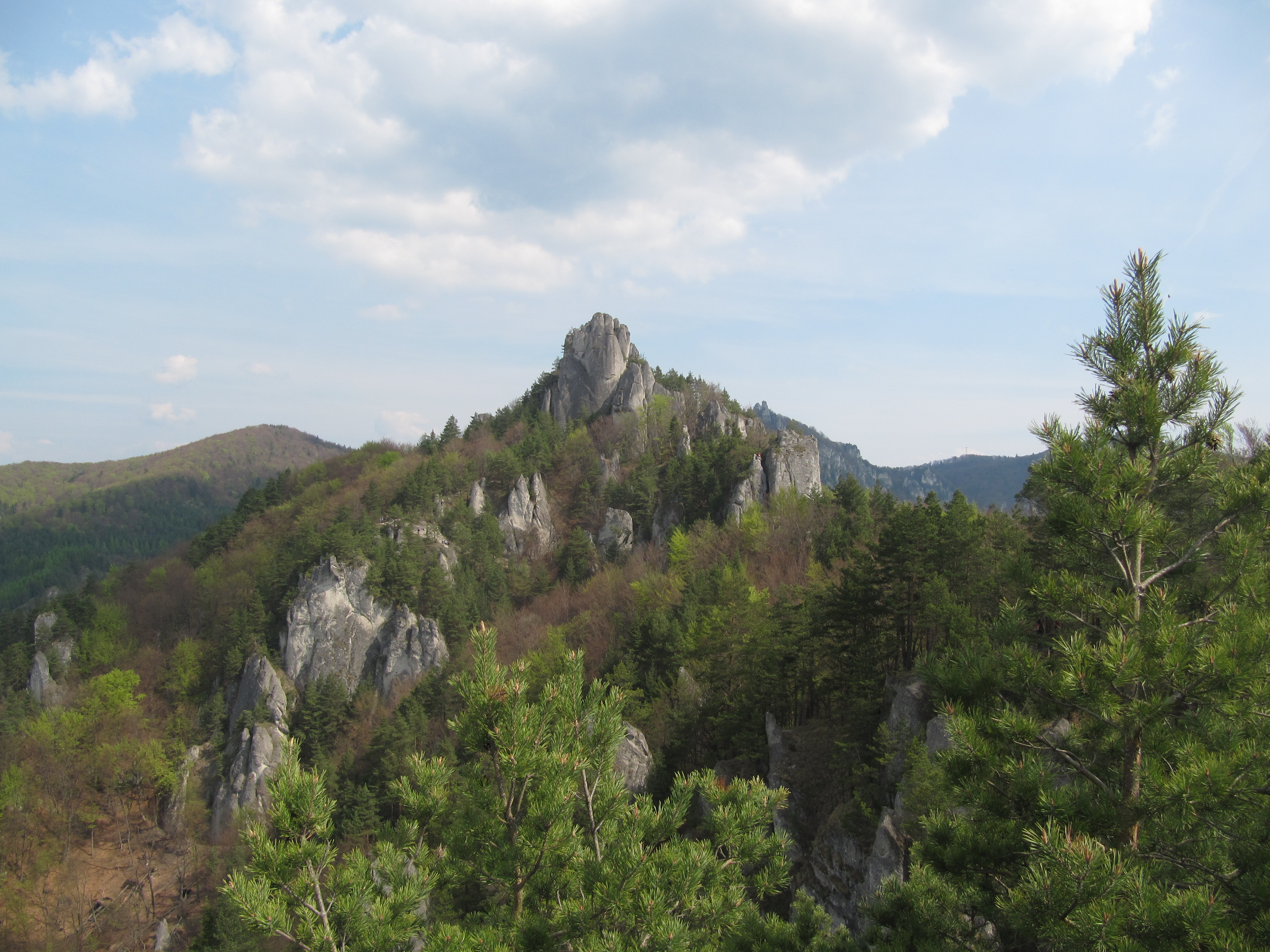
Súľov Rocks in Strážov Mountains Protected Landscape Area

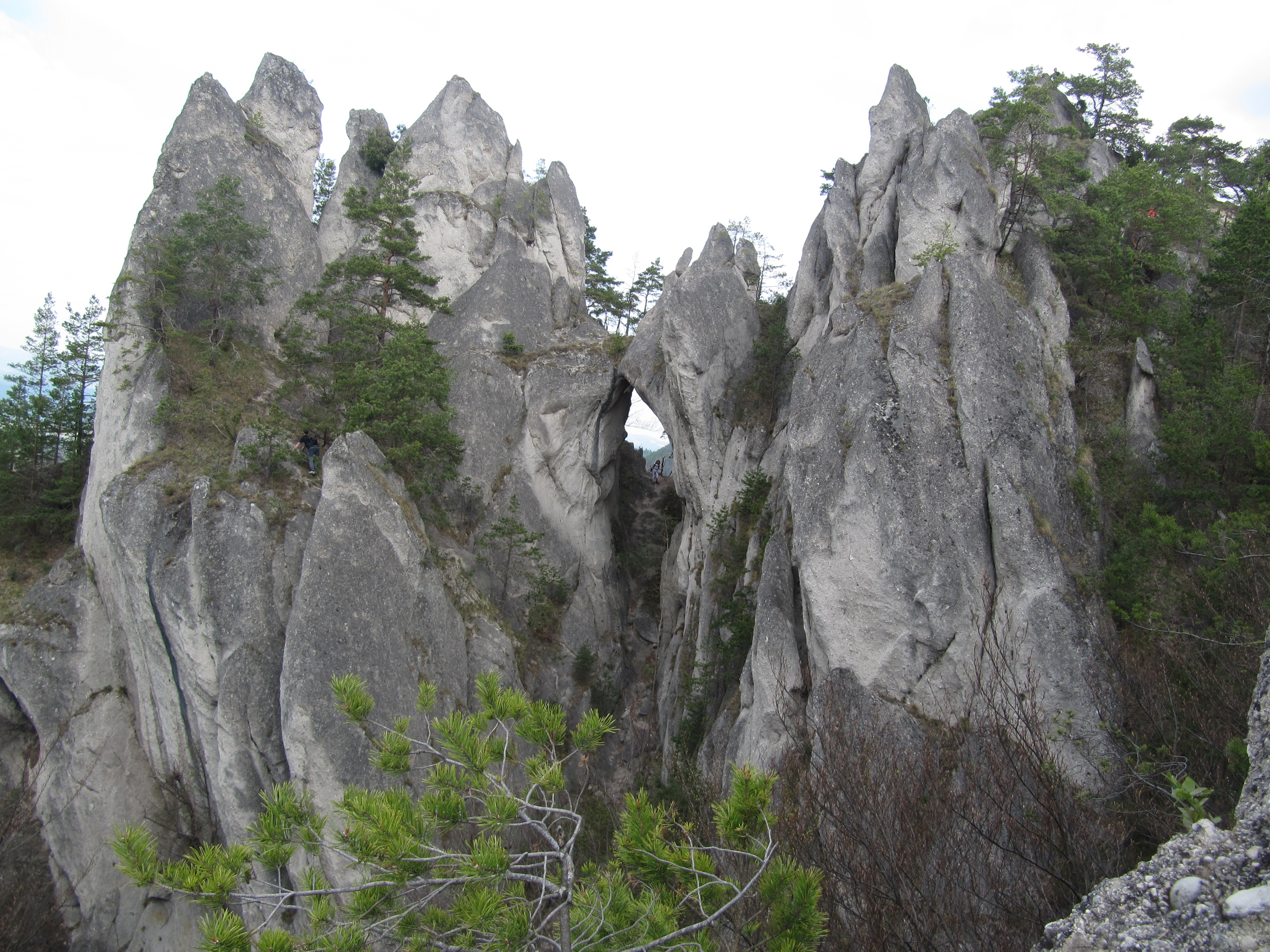
Súľov Rocks in Strážov Mountains Protected Landscape Area

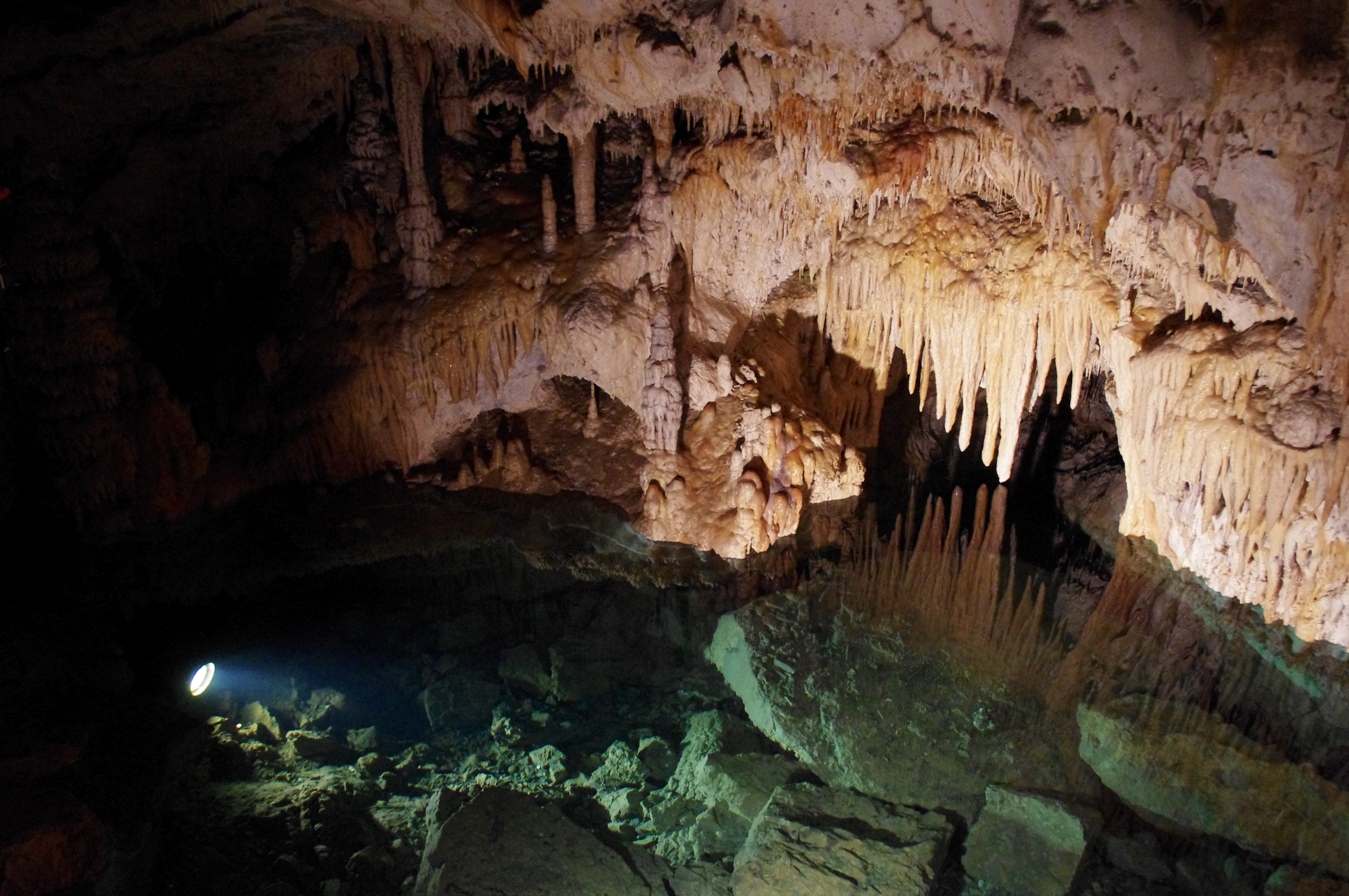
Demänovská Cave of Liberty
