= Wooden churches of the Slovak Carpathians =

Wooden Churches of the Slovak part of the Carpathian Mountain Area
UNESCO World Heritage Site
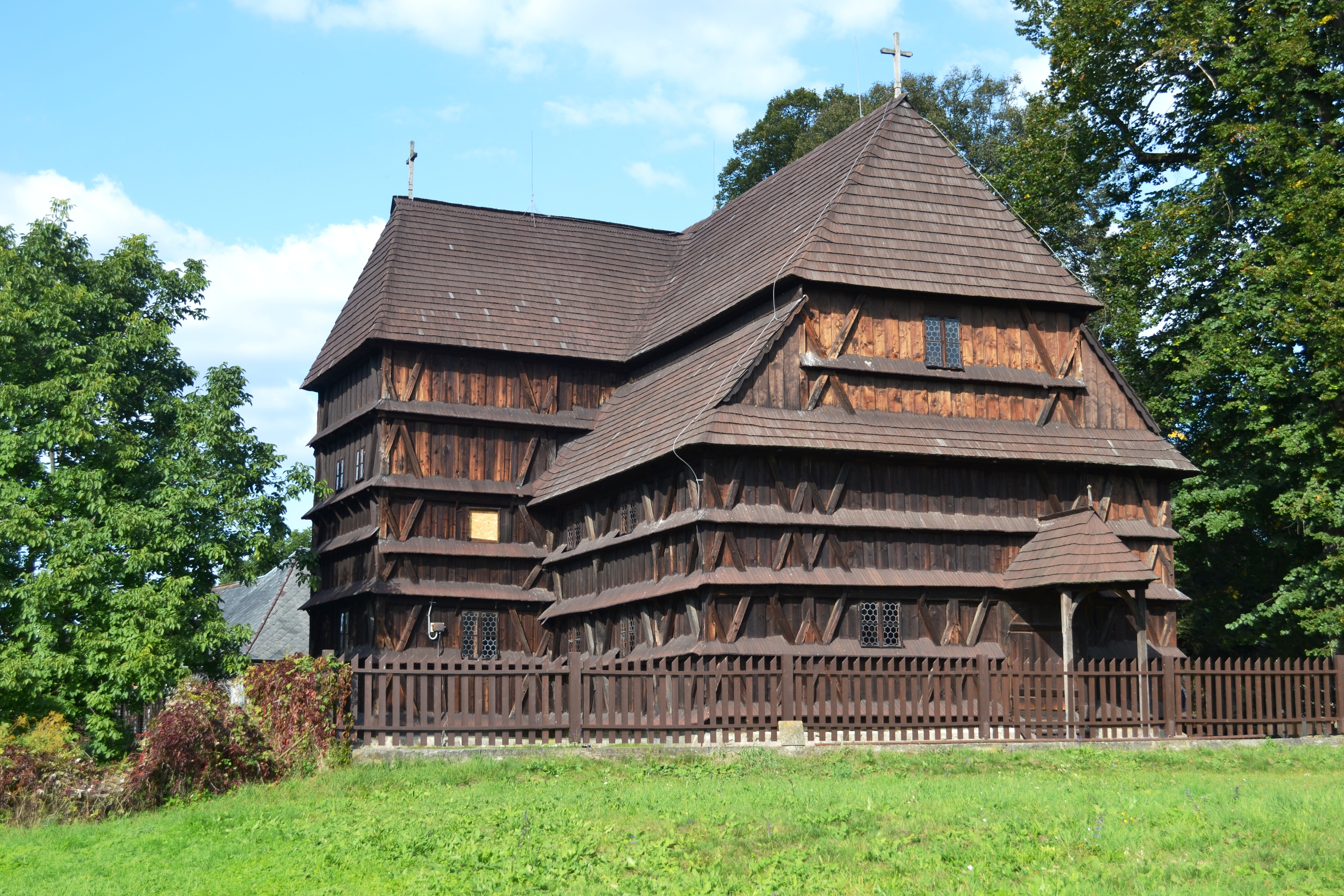
- Wooden church in Hronsek
- Interactive map of Wooden Churches of the Slovak part of the Carpathian Mountain Area
- Location: Slovakia
- Includes: 1. Hervartov; 2. Tvrdosin; 3. Kezmarok; 4. Lestiny; 5. Hronsek (church); 6. Hronsek (belfry); 7. Bodruzal; 8. Ladomirová; 9. Ruská Bystrá
- Criteria: Cultural: (iii), (iv)
- Reference: 1273
- Inscription: 2008 (32nd Session)
- Area: 2.5644 ha (6.337 acres)
- Buffer zone: 90.4141 ha (223.418 acres)
- Coordinates: 49°20′10″N 19°33′30″E

Carpathian Wooden Churches is the name of a UNESCO World Heritage Site that consists of nine wooden religious buildings constructed between the 16th and 18th centuries in eight different locations in Slovakia. They include two Roman Catholic (Hervartov, Tvrdošín), three Protestant (so-called Articular churches in Hronsek, Leštiny, Kežmarok) and three Greek Catholic churches (Bodružal, Ruská Bystrá, Ladomirová) plus one belfry in Hronsek.

In addition to these churches there are about 50 more wooden churches in the territory of present-day Slovakia mainly in the northern and eastern part of the Prešov Region (see e.g. this map).

== Location map ==
Wooden churches of the Slovak Carpathians
Wooden churches in Slovakia inscribed in the World Heritage Site list.

== List of the sites ==
Following is the list of wooden religious buildings included in the World Heritage site.

Church	Location	Period	Coordinates	Photo
Church of Saint-Francis of Assisi	Hervartov (Prešov Region)	15th century	49°14′50″N 21°12′15″E	
Church of All Saints	Tvrdošín (Žilina Region)	15th century	49°20′10″N 19°33′30″E	
Wooden articular church in Kežmarok	Kežmarok (Prešov Region)	1717	49°8′35″N 20°25′50″E	
Wooden articular church	Leštiny (Žilina Region)	1688	49°11′25″N 19°21′37″E	
Wooden articular church	Hronsek (Banská Bystrica Region)	1726	48°38′56″N 19°9′17″E	
Belfry	Hronsek (Banská Bystrica Region)		48°38′56″N 19°9′19″E	
Church of Saint-Nicolas	Bodružal (Prešov Region)	1658	49°21′9″N 21°42′28″E	
Church of Saint Michael the Archangel	Ladomirová (Prešov Region)	1742	49°19′42″N 21°37′35″E	
Church of Saint Nicolas	Ruská Bystrá (Košice Region)	18th century	48°51′25″N 22°17′47″E	

=== Roman Catholic ===
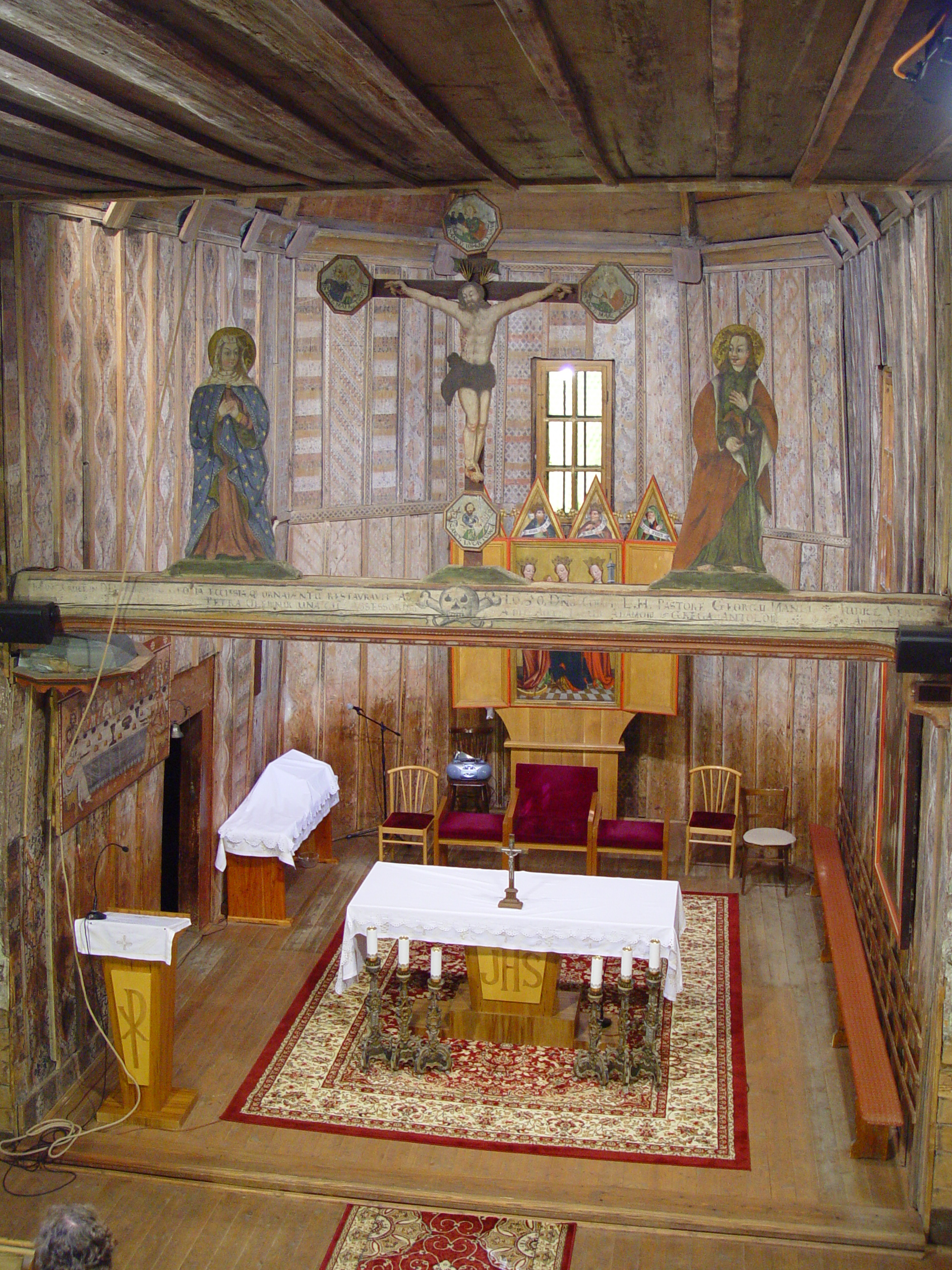
Inner view of the wooden church in Hervartov

The Roman Catholic wooden church of St. Francis of Assisi in Hervartov has a Gothic character as represented by its tall but narrow structure unusual for a wooden church. It was built in the second half of the 15th century and thus represents the oldest of its type in Slovakia. The floor is made of stones again unlike in most of wooden churches where it is usually made of wood. Rare wall paintings were added in 1665 during the reformation period and they depict, among others, Adam and Eve in the Eden or the struggle of St. George with the dragon. The main altar of Virgin Mary, St. Catherine of Alexandria, and St. Barbara was made between 1460 and 1470 and restored in the second half of the 20th century.

Roman Catholic Gothic church of All Saints in Tvrdošín was built in the second half of the 15th century and modified in a Renaissance style in the 17th century. The baroque main altar depicting All Saints is from the end of the 17th century. The remaining part of the original Gothic altar with St. Peter and St. John the Baptist ended up in a museum in Budapest after World War I. Also worthy of notice are the painted ceiling depicting the starry heaven, as well as many religious artefacts from the 17th century.

=== Protestant ===
Severe restrictions embodied in the articles of the Congress of Sopron (1681) that enabled building of Protestant, so called articular, churches caused their extraordinary appearance. They must have been built within the single year, without any metal parts such as nails, and without any tower. Thus the construction of the church in Hronsek began on 23 October 1725 and was finished in the autumn of the 1726, the same year when the adjacent belfry was built as well. Church is 8m high and has a shape of the cross with arms 23 and 18m long. As there are many unusual motives from Scandinavian architecture, it is assumed that craftsmen from Norway and/or Sweden participated on the construction site. Unique is also the ordering of the benches on the choirs so that the church can accommodate 1100 worshipers through its 5 doors. The altar has 6 tables from 1771 by Master Samuel Kialovič.

Construction of the wooden evangelical articular church in Leštiny in the Orava region of Slovakia was ordered by Jób Zmeškal and finished in 1688. Interior dates back to the 17th and 18th century and it is whole beautifully painted. Main altar is from the 18th century and the famous Slovak poet Pavol Országh Hviezdoslav was baptised here as well.

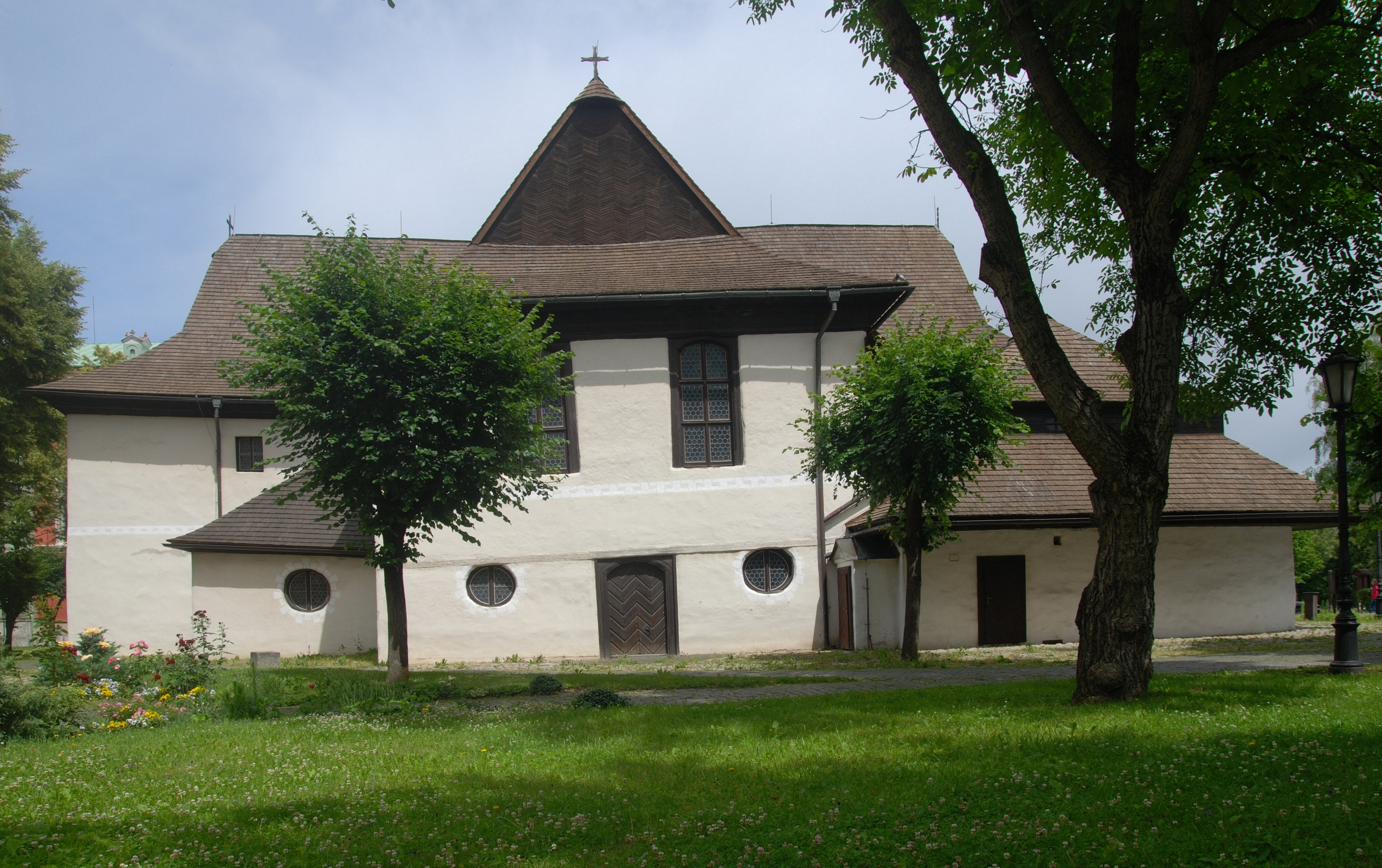
Articular wooden church in Kežmarok

Built in 1717, church in Kežmarok with one of the most fascinating interiors with exceptional wall paintings as well as wood carvings is considered to be the most beautiful of the last 5 remaining articular churches in Slovakia. In order to raise money for the construction of the church, fund-raising campaigns were conducted in many parts of Europe, e.g. Sweden and Denmark. The architect of the church was Juraj Müttermann from Poprad and with its width of 30.31m, length of 34.68m, and height of 20.60m, it together with 6 side choirs it can serve more than 1500 worshipers, which is quite an achievement for a wooden church. Ceiling paintings started in 1717 and continued for several decades. They depict blue heaven, 12 apostles, 4 evangelists, plus the Holy Trinity above the altar. Ján Lerch from Kežmarok made the altar between 1718 and 1727 with the central motive of the Calvary. Extraordinary masterwork is also the organ built between 1717 and 1720 by Vavrinec Čajkovský, and extended in 1729 by Master Martin Korabinský from Spišská Nová Ves. After general restoration in the 1990s services are again regularly hold there.

=== Greek Catholic ===
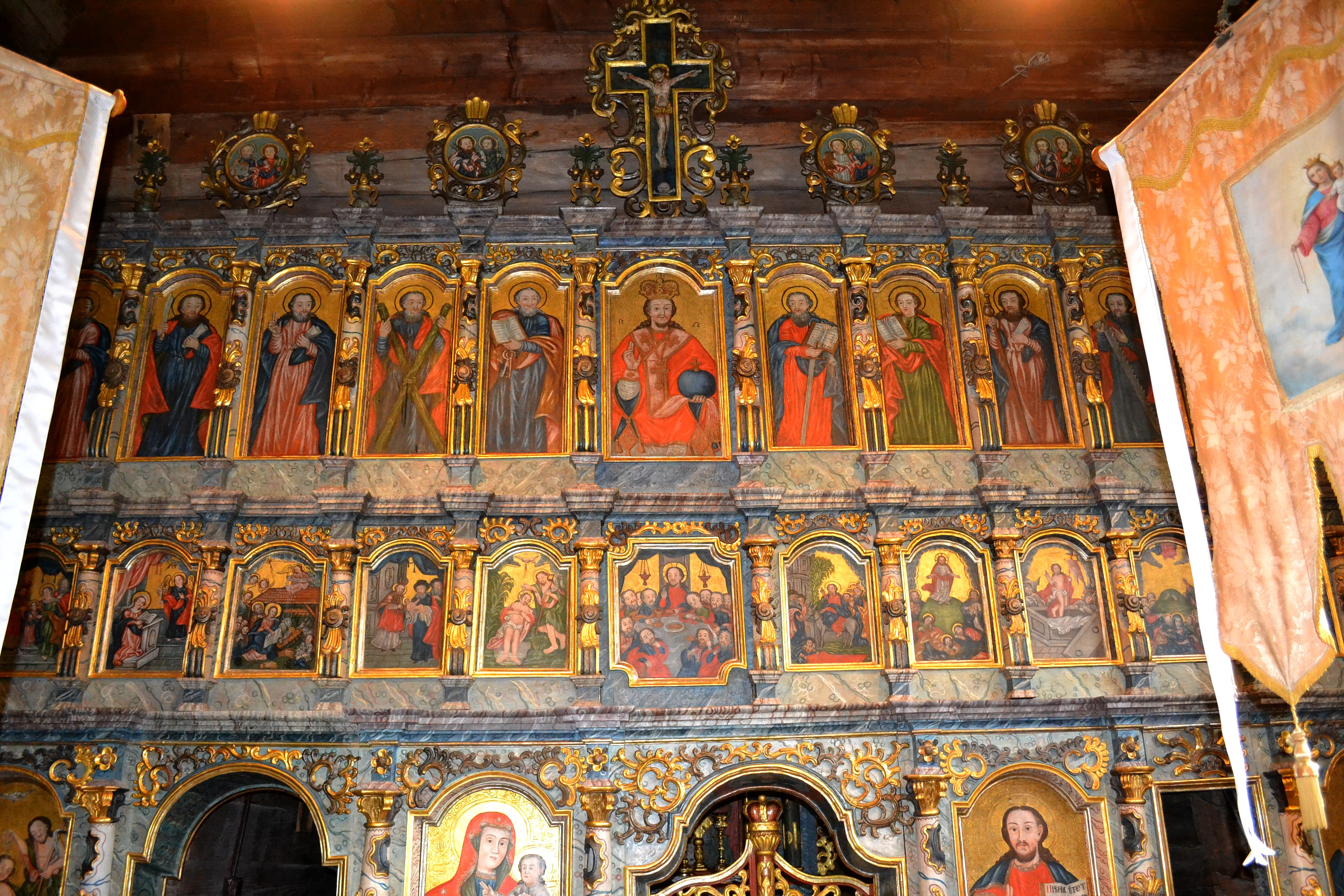
Greek Catholic wooden church of Saint Nicholas in Bodružal

Greek Catholic church of St. Nicholas in Bodružal built in 1658 consists of three interconnected square-shaped parts along the east–west axis with 3 towers (the biggest one with the bells) topped with little onion domes and iron crosses. Artistically it belongs to folk Baroque style. Church is surrounded with the cemetery, wall, and the belfry from the 19th century. Some of the 18th century wall paintings are still preserved as well as iconostasis, and other icons from the same century. Altar was reconstructed in 1990s and the whole building subsequently in the 2004. Two of the three bells was melted down in the World War I and replaced only in the second half of the 1920s. From 1968 until the middle of the 1990s the church was biritual, i.e. holding Greek Catholic as well as Eastern Orthodox services. Nowadays it belongs only to the Greek Catholic Church.

Church of St. Nicholas in Ruská Bystrá built at the beginning of the 18th century has just 2 towers and the shape of its almost perfect geometric roof resembles traditional houses of peasants. Interior with religious artefacts dates back to the 18th century as well. Church of Archangel Michael in Ladomirová built in 1742 without a single nail has basically the same design as the one in Bodružal including its surroundings (wall, cemetery, belfry).

== See also ==
- Similar World Heritage Sites
  - Wooden churches of Southern Lesser Poland
  - Wooden churches of Maramureș in Romania
  - Kizhi in Russia
- Wooden tserkvas of the Carpathian region in Poland and Ukraine
- Wooden churches in Ukraine
- Vernacular architecture of the Carpathians

== Resources ==
- "Wooden Churches of the Slovak part of the Carpathian Mountain Area". UNESCO World Heritage Centre.
- "Wooden Churches in Slovakia". Drevené kostolíky na Slovensku. Archived from the original on 28 July 2009.
- "Wooden Churches as National Cultural Monuments in eastern Slovakia". Drevené kostolíky Karpát. Archived from the original on 9 December 2008.
- "Drevený artikulárny kostol v Kežmarku". Evangelic churches in Slovakia. Archived from the original on 4 September 2009.
- Slotová, Mária (2002). Carpathian Wooden Pearls. trans. Magdaléna Lazarová. Prešov: Dino. ISBN 978-80-85575-22-4.
