= Wooden articular church of Hronsek =

- Drevený artikulárny kostol v Hronseku
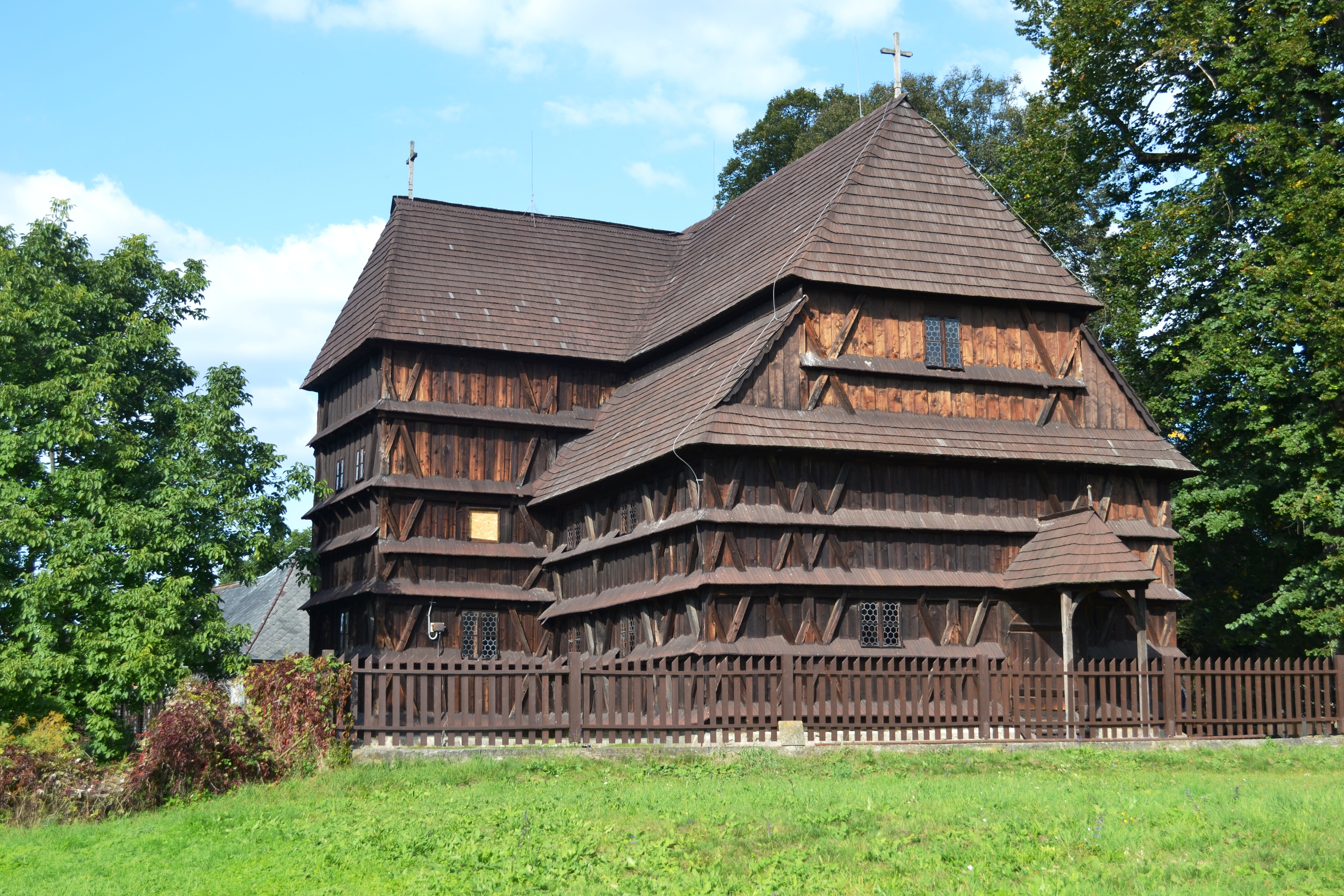
- Wooden articular church of Hronsek

Religion
- Affiliation: Lutheranism
- Region: Banská Bystrica

Location
- Location: Hronsek
- Country: Slovakia
- Interactive map of Wooden articular church of Hronsek
- Coordinates: 48.649167°N 19.155°E

Architecture
- Type: Church
- Completed: autumn of 1726
- Wooden articular church of Hronsek

UNESCO World Heritage Site
- Part of: Wooden Churches of the Slovak part of the Carpathian Mountain Area
- Criteria: Cultural: (iii), (iv)
- Reference: 1273-005
- Inscription: 2008 (32nd Session)

Wooden articular church of Hronsek is a Lutheran church situated in the village of Hronsek, in Slovakia.

== Dimensions ==
The church is in the form of a cross with the longer arm measuring 23 m and the shorter arm measuring 18 m. The height of the church is 8 m.

== History ==
Construction of the church started on October 23, 1725 and finished in the autumn of 1726.

On July 7, 2008, the church along with seven other monuments was declared a UNESCO world heritage site under the name "Wooden Churches of the Slovak part of the Carpathian Mountain Area".

The name refers to churches that were built as a result of new freedoms due to articles No. 25 and No. 26 adopted at the Diet of Sopron in 1681. The Diet of Sopron was a meeting of the Nobel families of Hungary, at the request of the Habsburg King (Holy Roman Emperor) Leopold I in the city of Sopron. He was compelled to find compromises and concessions with the nobility in order to quell their rebellion, regain their loyalty and stabilise the empire. The prior decade was known as the "Sorrowful Decade" where Leopold had suspended the Hungarian constitution and pursued a vigorous, often brutal, Counter-Reformation policy against Evangelists (Protestant and Lutherans).

Articles 25 and 26 granted limited religious freedoms to the Evangelists, allowing the building of 38 churches. However, the stipulations were the land would be granted by the state, often resulting in difficult or swampy building locations and would be outside city walls, which made them vulnerable to attacks. They also could only be made of wood making them vulnerable to fire and could not have bell towers. Out of the 38 Articular churches built only five have survived today: Hronsek, Istebné, Leštiny, Paludza and the church here at Kežmarok.

The church was built 1726. The peaceful courtyard is shaded by four massive linden trees, two of which have stood since the church’s construction. The roof is covered with wooden shingles and crowned with oak crosses on three sides, while a single rooster, symbolizing Christian vigilance, perches above one entrance. The church is large with 1,100 seats, with a barrel vaulted ceiling that gives the church outstanding acoustics, making it ideal for classical music concerts. There are while oak columns carved with Ionic ornaments and spruce beams create a striking structural and decorative effect, and thirty windows illuminating the interior. The choir galleries are adorned with linden leaf motifs, symbolizing Slavic identity.

The altar features six paintings by Samuel Mialovič from 1771, which are rotated according to the church calendar. The paintings depict central scenes from the life of Christ and key biblical events, designed to guide the congregation’s meditation and devotion. Among them are images of the Last Supper, the Crucifixion, the Risen Christ, and various saints significant to the Evangelical tradition. Each panel is executed in the Baroque style, with expressive figures, vibrant colors, and dynamic compositions that draw the eye and emphasize the spiritual drama of the scenes.

== Gallery ==
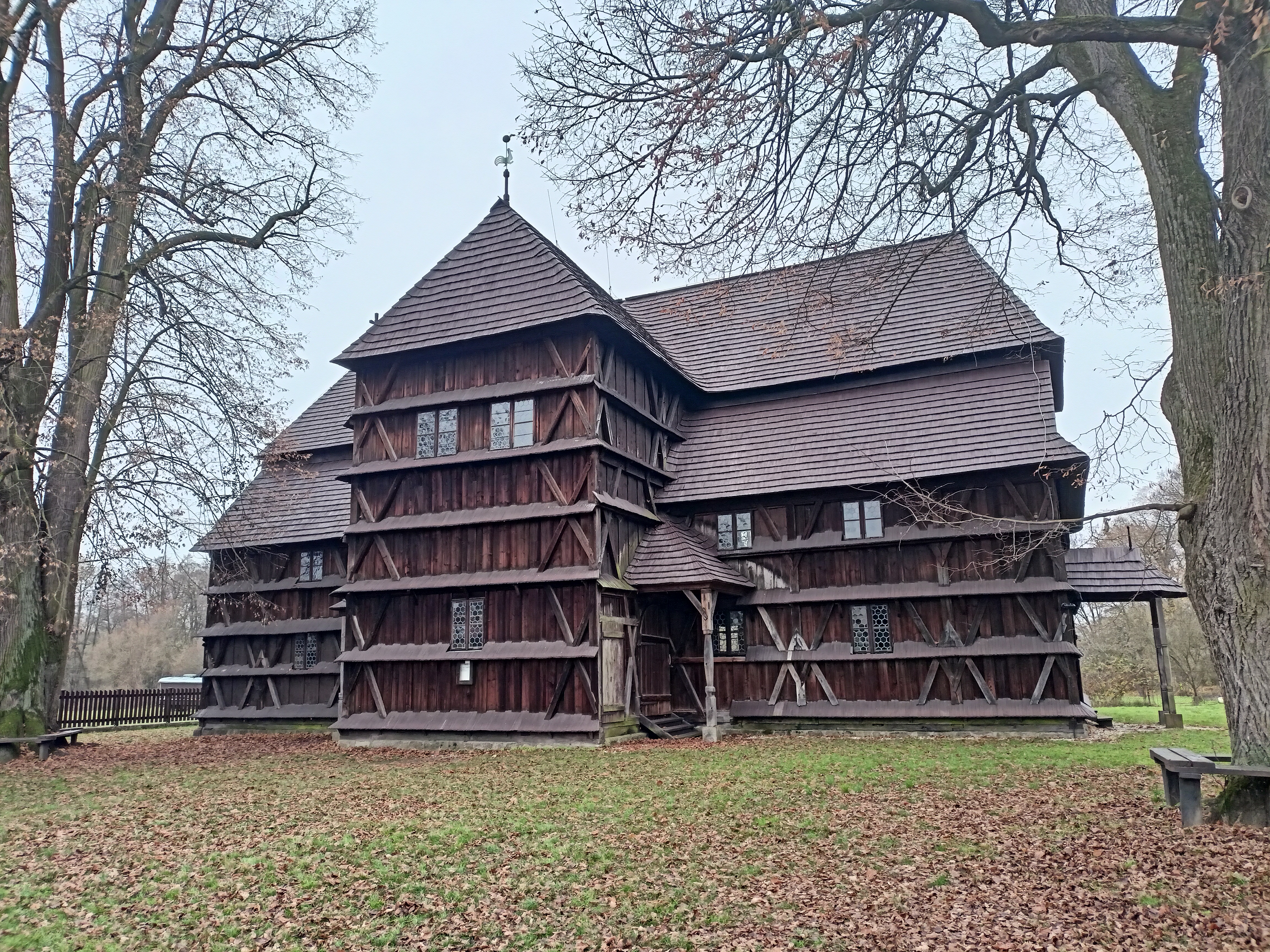
General view of the church

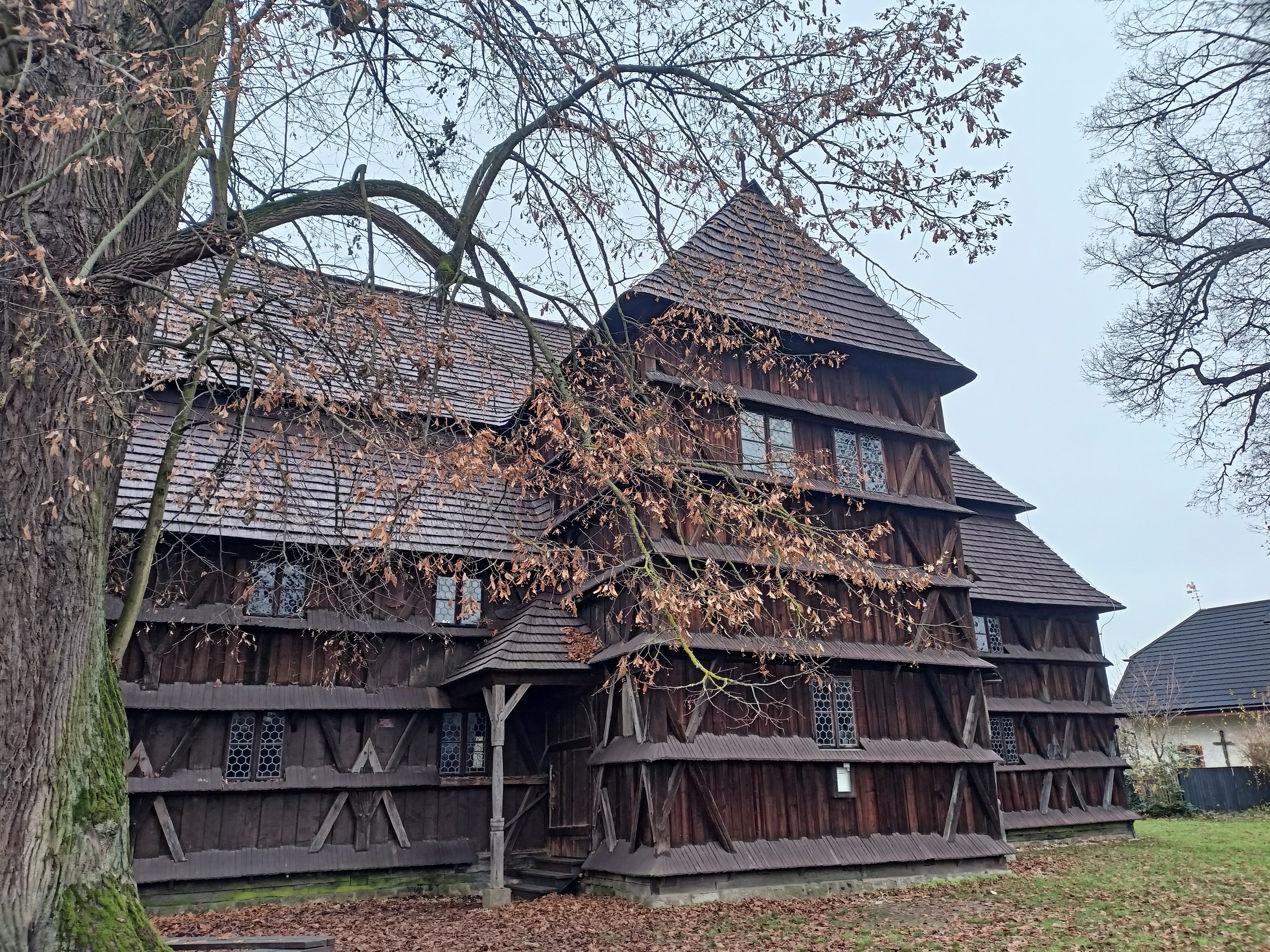
Eastern part of the church

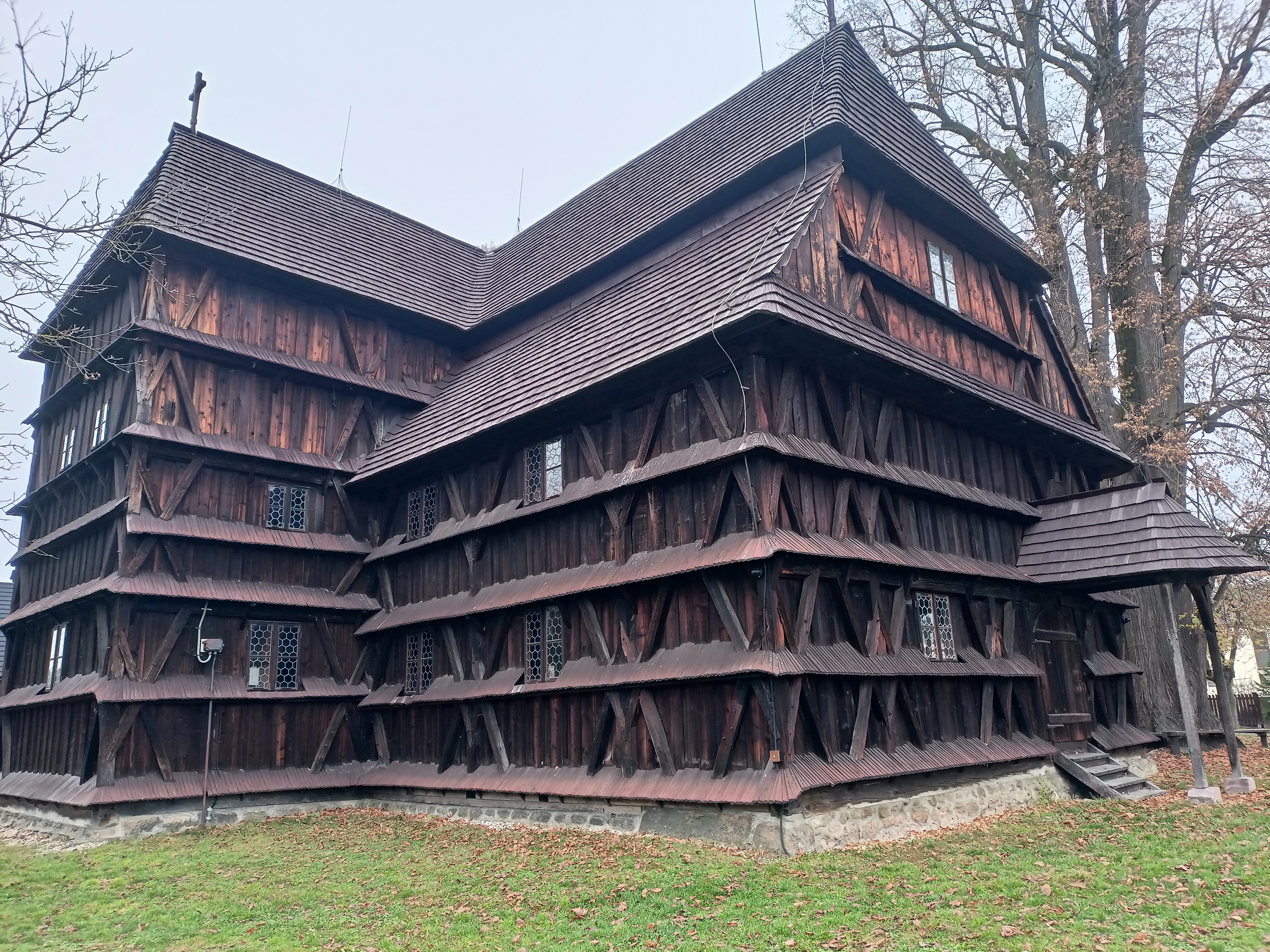
View from the North-East

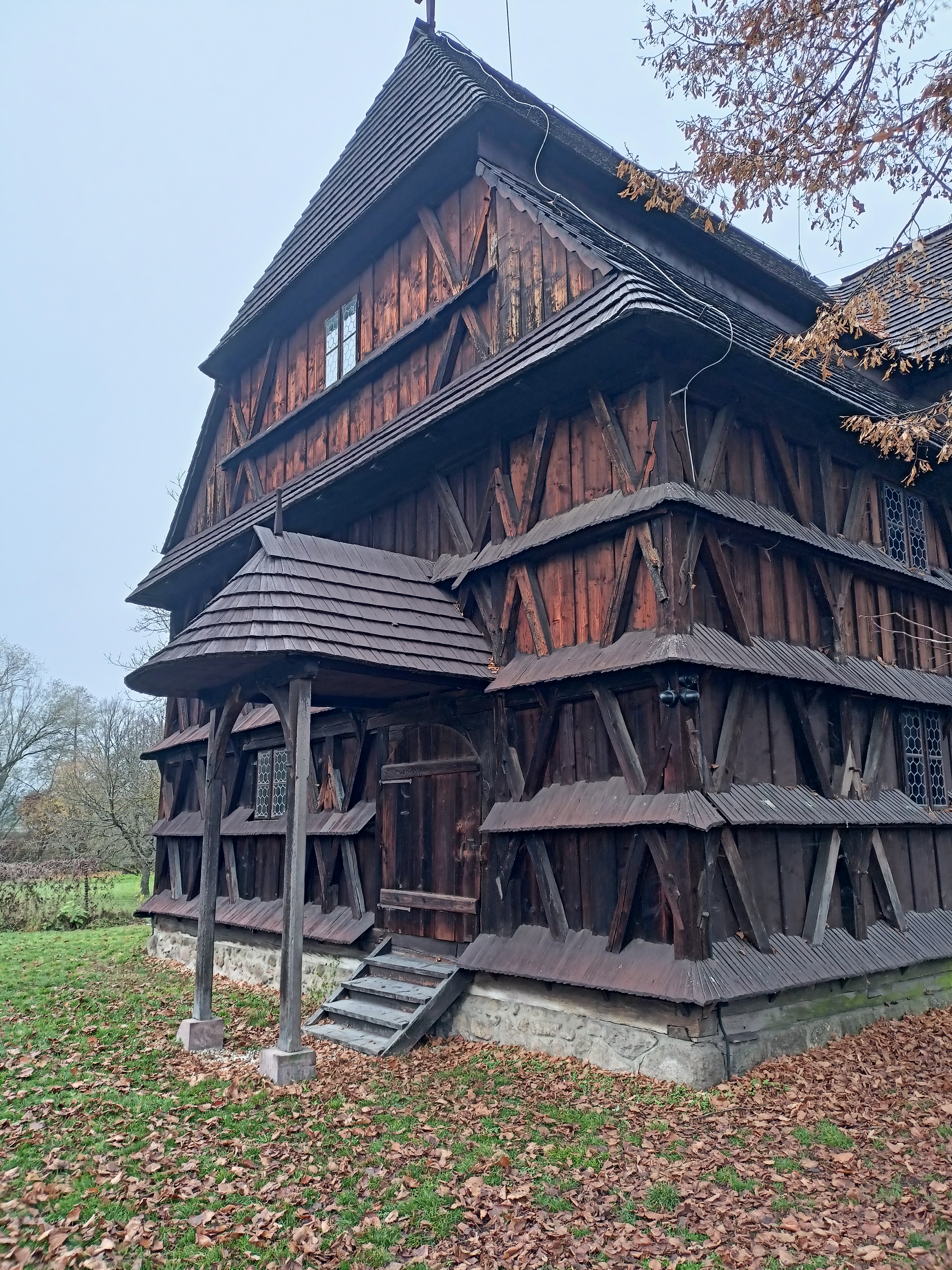
One of the church entrances

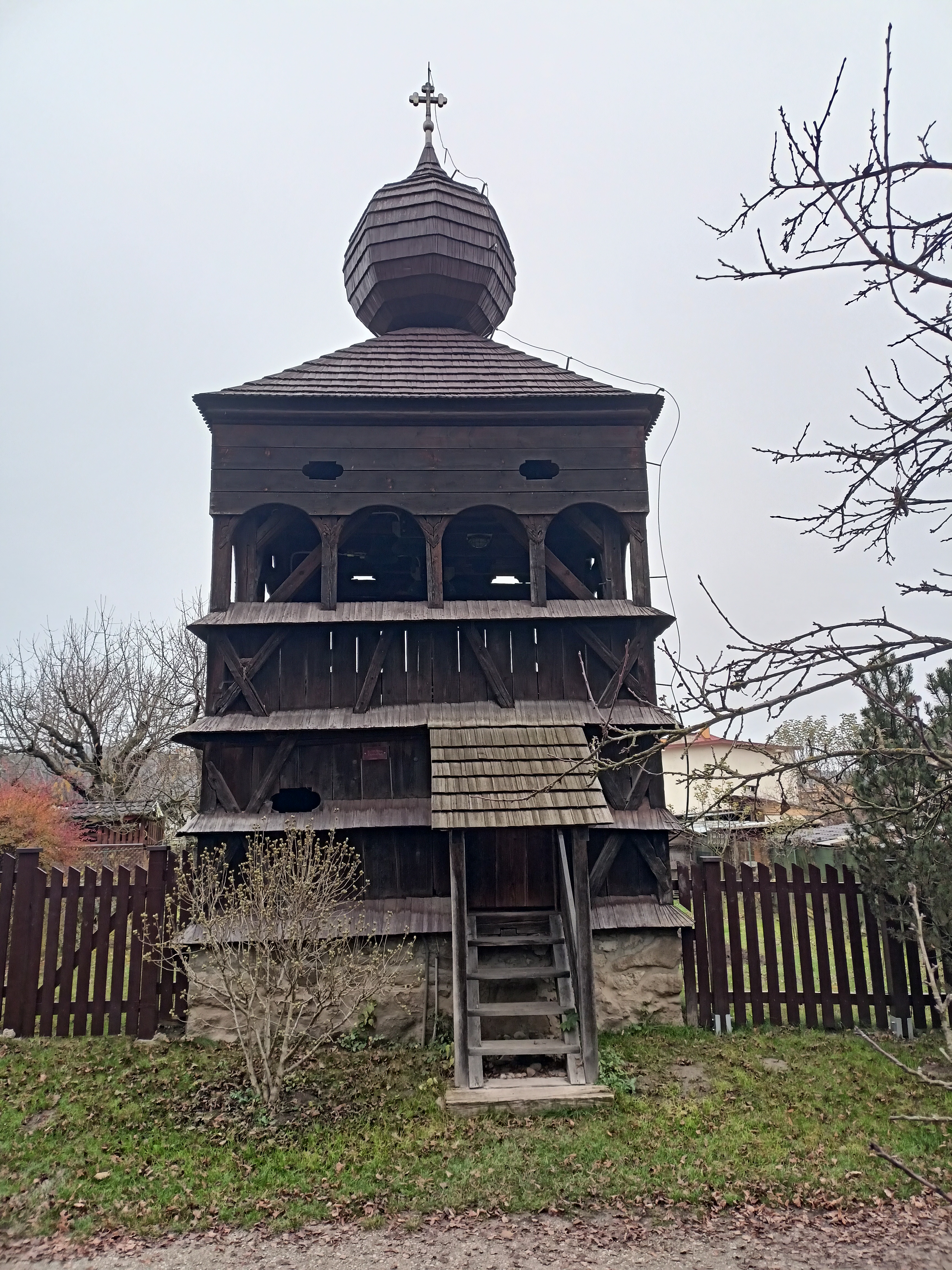
Nearby belltower

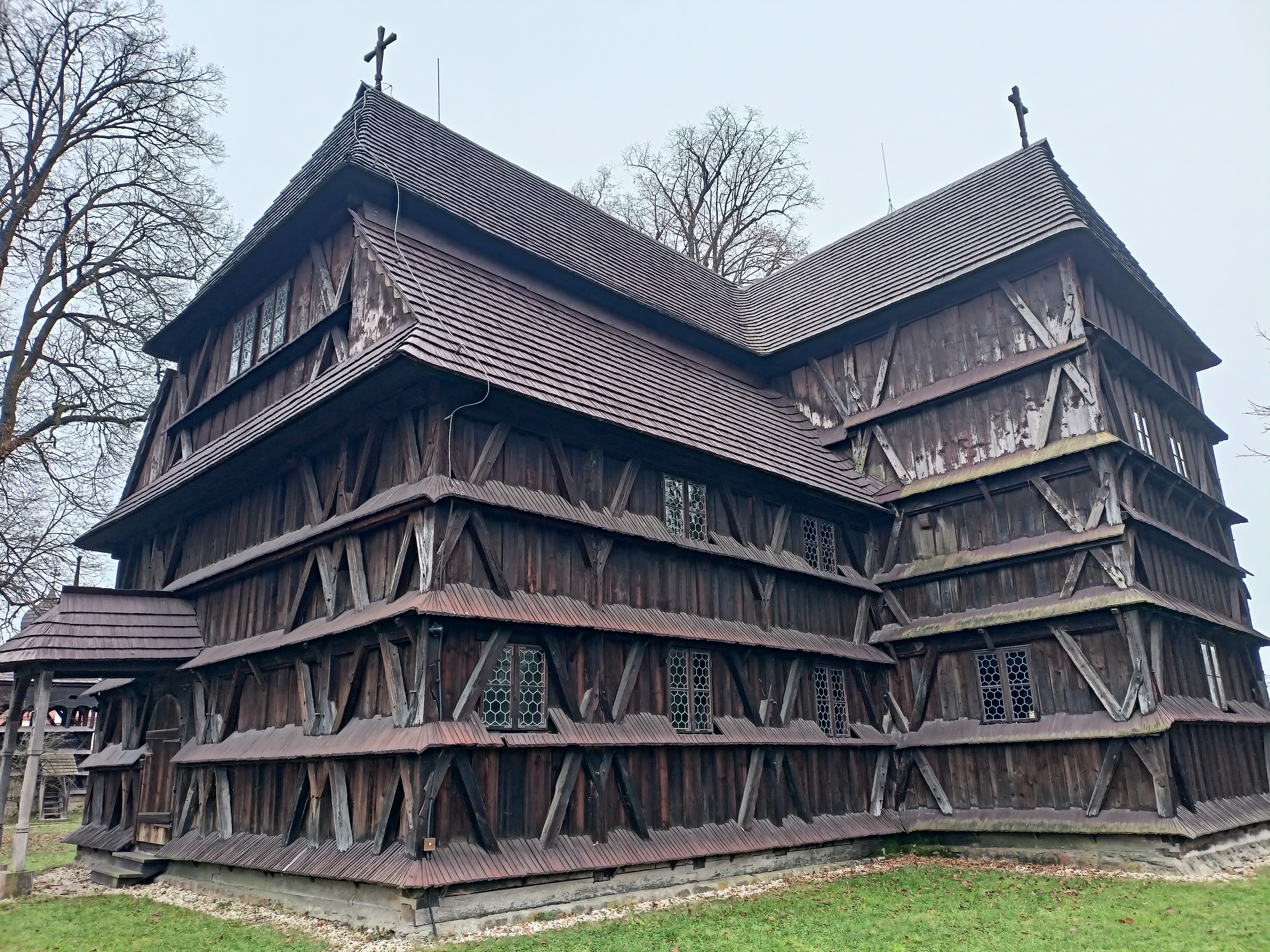
Side view of the church with one of its entrances
