= Vernacular architecture of the Carpathians =

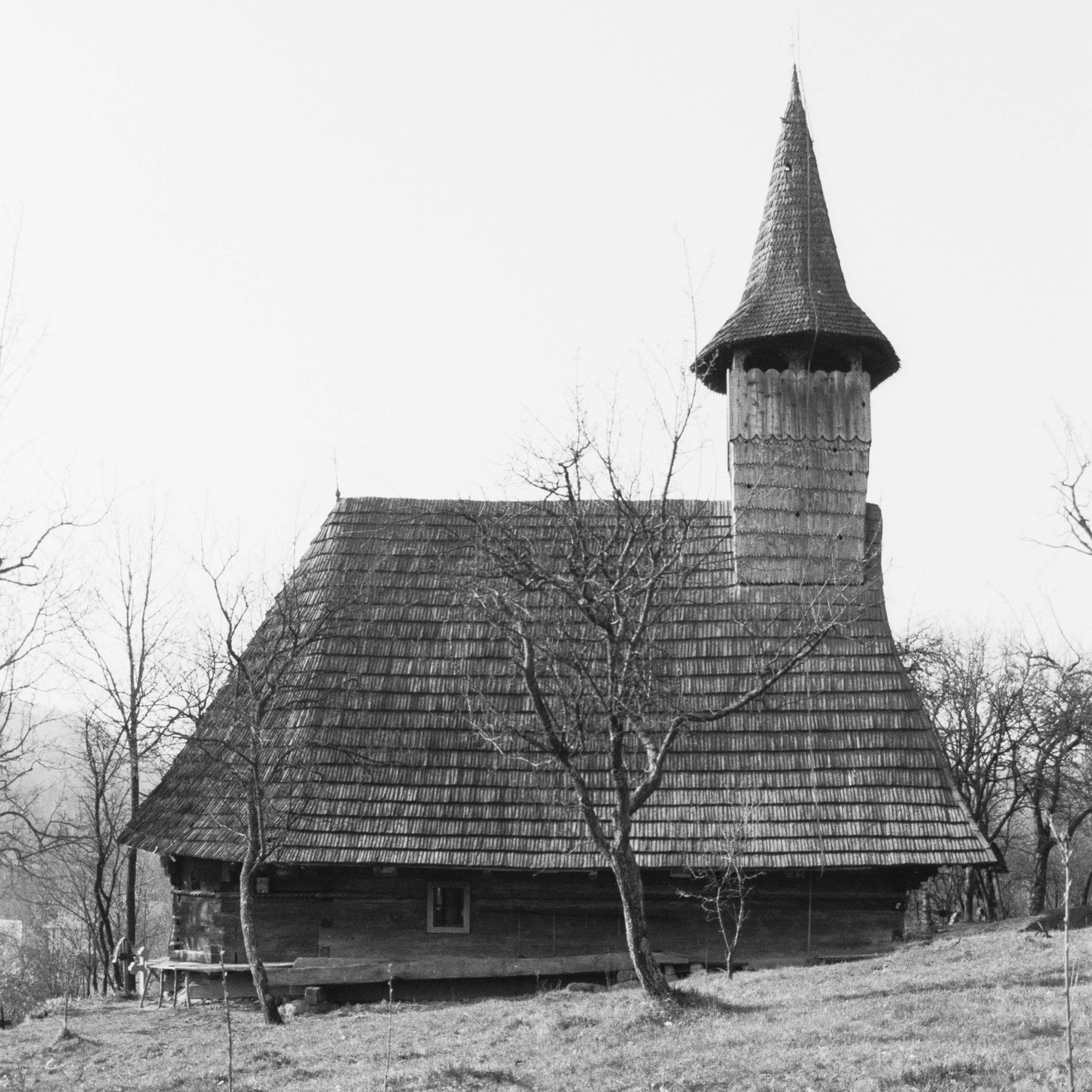
Sârbi Susani church, one of the Wooden Churches of Maramureş.

The vernacular architecture of the Carpathians draws on environmental and cultural sources to create unique designs. Vernacular architecture refers to non-professional, folk architecture, including that of the peasants. In the Carpathian Mountains and the surrounding foothills, wood and clay are the primary traditional building materials.

== Effect of culture and religion ==
=== Eastern Christianity ===
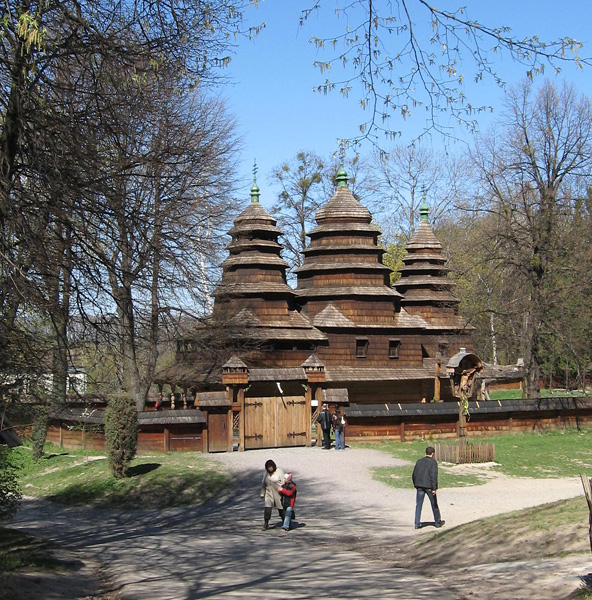
Kryvka Church (now on display at the Lviv Museum of Folk Architecture and Culture in Lviv, Ukraine) was originally from Sambir Raion, in the ethnographic territory of the Boyko people. Its tripartite, domed design and all-wooden construction are representative of the regional style.

Because most Ukrainian, Rusyn, and Romanian people are Eastern Orthodox Christians, their building techniques have traditionally incorporated religious considerations into their buildings that are distinct from their Western Christian and Jewish neighbours.

Firstly, all churches are divided into three parts (the narthex, the nave, and the sanctuary) and include an iconostasis (a wall of icons). The outer shape is often cruciform (cross shaped), but will always include a central dome and often several other domes. Parishioners face east during worship and there are no pews.

The main door and windows of the home face south (as in passive solar design), and icons and other religious paraphernalia are displayed in a special icon corner, usually on the east wall.

=== Judaism ===
East-Central European synagogues are noted for their unique all-wooden design.

== Materials and techniques ==
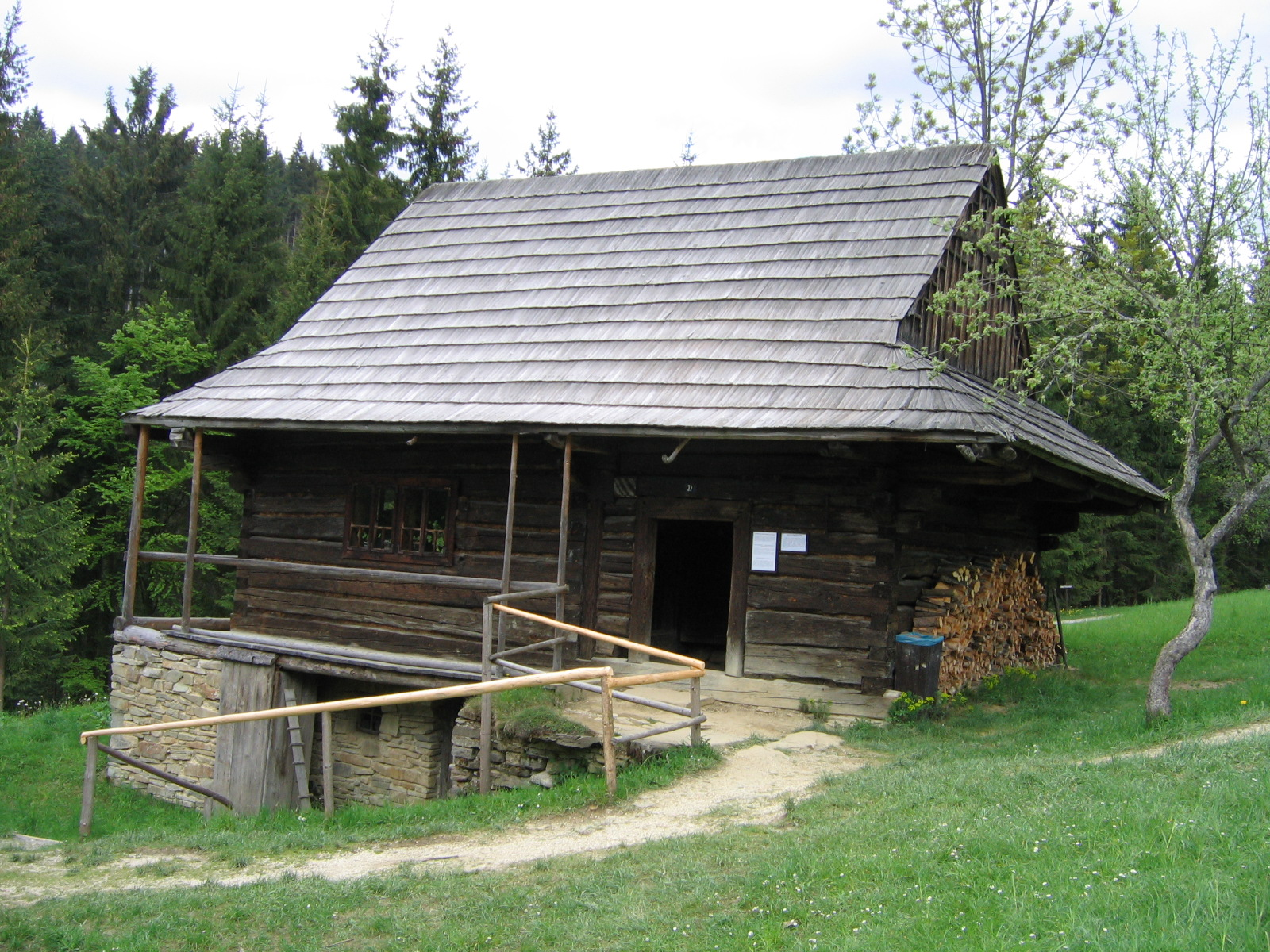
A log cottage from an open-air museum in the Kysuce region of Slovakia. This foothills region is bordered by two Carpathian sub-ranges, the Maple Mountains to the west and the Moravian-Silesian Beskids to the north. Cold snowy winters and a relative abundance of timber combine to inform the use of log wall construction and wooden shakes.

Details vary from locale to locale but the majority of homes in this area have traditionally been a single-storey rectangular plan; one or two rooms; a central chimney; a gable, hipped-gable or hipped roof; and plastered and limewashed exteriors.

Materials used were those that could be procured locally, including wood (usually oak), mud, straw, fieldstone, lime, and animal dung. Roofs in densely wooded and hilly areas are typically clad in wooden shakes or shingles, while flatter and more open areas have traditionally used rye straw.

In the late 19th century two types of construction predominated, horizontal log construction, and frame and fill construction. Log walls were common in areas where wood was available. In places with very poor timber or with an extreme timber shortage post and sill or wattle and daub techniques could also be used.

For horizontal log construction, logs needed to be notched in order to hold together. The simple saddle notch is the easiest and therefore common. Dovetailing is used by people with more experience in woodworking.

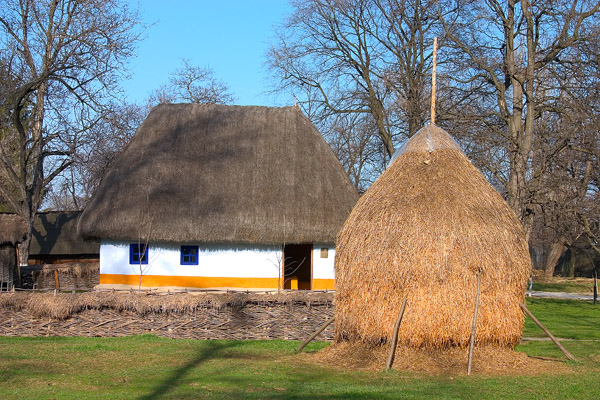
A house with a thatched roof and limewashed plaster walls from the Dimitrie Gusti National Village Museum in Bucharest, Romania. The use of plaster and straw suggests it is not from the highlands of the Carpathians proper, but a nearby valley or plain.

Many peoples in this area plaster their log homes inside and out to keep out moisture, improve insulation, to hide imperfections in construction, and for general aesthetic value. Traditional plaster is made of clay, water, dung, and straw or chaff. Several coats may be applied to create a smooth finish, and then coated with lime and water to produce a pleasing white colour and protect the clay from the rain.

Thatched roofs are traditional, but have been declining in popularity for over a century because they may pose a fire hazard. Dirt floors are common, and are made hard by washing with a dung mixture, although wooden floors are preferred.

Typically the long wall of a house is between 26 feet (7.9 m) and 30 feet (9.1 m) and the side wall between 12 feet (3.7 m) and 17 feet (5.2 m). The centre of the home is dominated by a traditional clay oven (Ukrainian: pich or pietz)

== World Heritage ==
- Wooden churches of Maramureş – Romania
- Wooden churches of the Slovak Carpathians – Slovakia
- Wooden churches of Southern Lesser Poland – Poland
- Wooden tserkvas of the Carpathian region in Poland and Ukraine – Poland and Ukraine

Tentative lists

- Worship wooden architecture (17th-18th centuries) in Polesye – Belarus
- Wooden bell-towers in the Upper Tisza-Region – Hungary

== See also ==
- Articular church
- Carpathian Wooden Churches
- Burdei
- Zakopane Style of Architecture
