= Articular church, Kežmarok =

Church in Kežmarok, Slovakia

Coordinates: 49°08′00″N 20°25′42″E

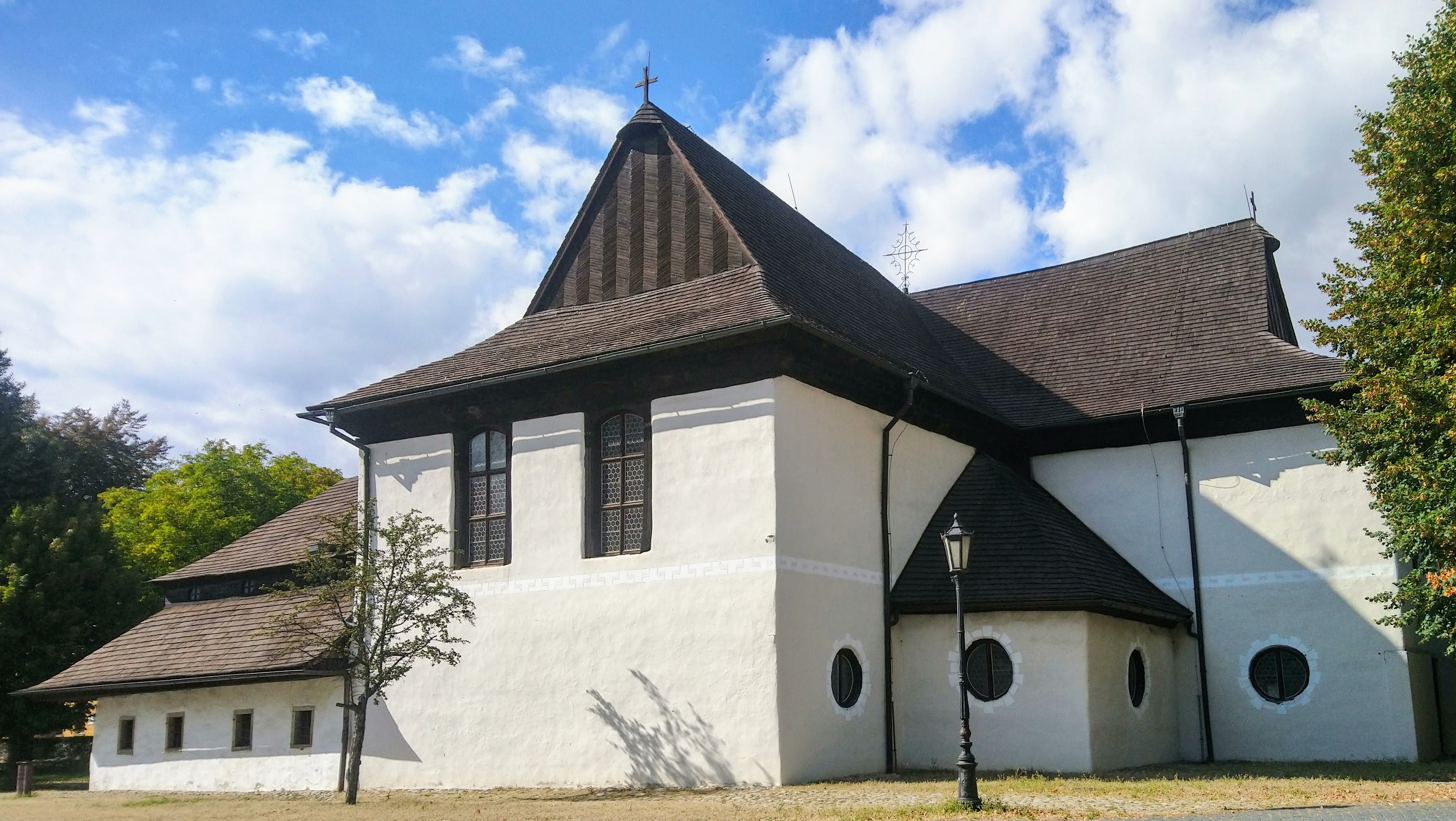
Kežmarok articular church

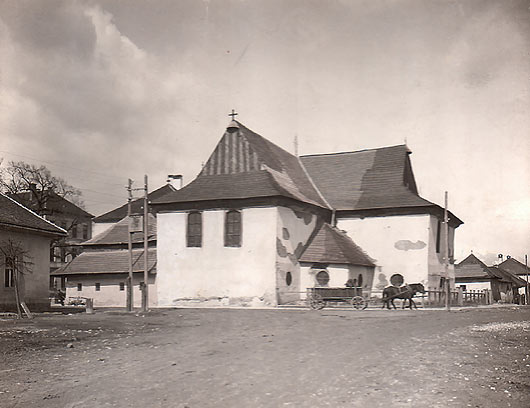
The church before its reconstruction in the 1990s

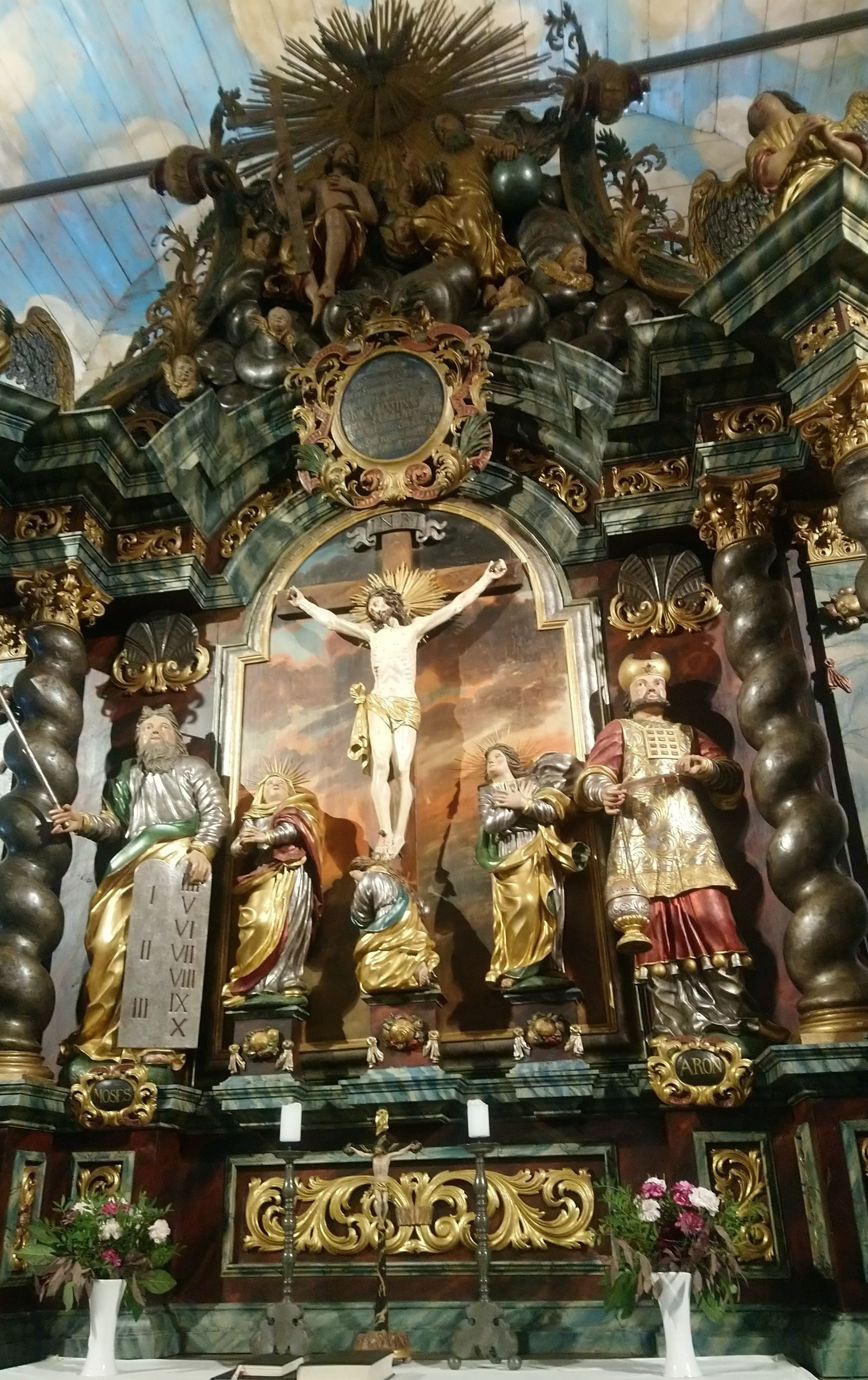
Carved altar in the church

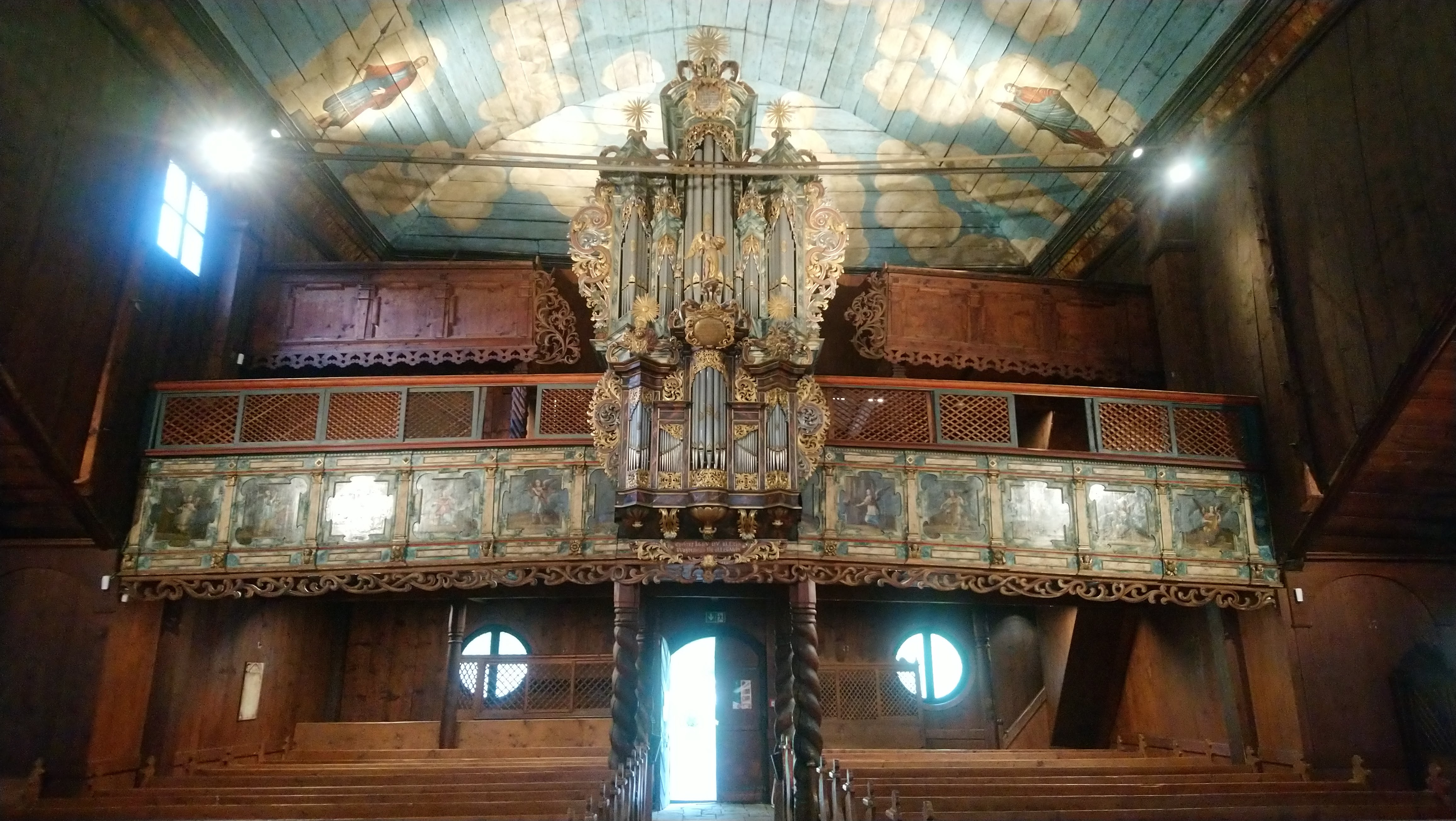
Organ and painted roof

The Articular church in Kežmarok (Slovak: Artikulárny kostol v Kežmarku) is a wooden church in Kežmarok, Slovakia. The local Lutherans built it following a period of religious persecution, when in 1681 the Congress of Sopron permitted Lutherans, in articles 26 and 27 of an agreement, to erect two churches in each of eleven counties of the Kingdom of Hungary, nine of which are in present-day Slovakia. The churchers were to be made of the cheapest possible materials - this meant wood; even nails were made exclusively of wood. The construction was financially supported by Protestants from various countries, including Sweden and Denmark.

The only stone part of the church is its sacristy, originally built in 1593 as a pub outside the city walls. In the 17th century, the Roman Catholic dynasty of Habsburgs persecuted Protestantism in the Habsburg monarchy, which included territory of present Slovakia at that time. The number of churches was limited to one in each free royal town, Kežmarok being one of them. The construction material had to be the cheapest possible (wood at that time) and a church had to be completed in 365 days. Furthermore, the site of a new Protestant church had to be chosen by a royal commission. In Kežmarok, a royal commission deliberately chose an ancient pub as a place of worship, in order to humiliate the local Protestant community. The pub was subsequently incorporated into a hastily constructed religious building as a sacristy.

The oldest parts are an epitaph from 1688 and a Renaissance baptistery from 1690. They are the only remaining parts of the first church. The second wooden church, erected in the Baroque style in 1717, completely replaced the first building. It has the shape of an equal-armed Greek cross. The space can accommodate 1,541 worshipers. According to a legend, circular windows were made by Swedish sailors contributing to the construction. The organ, completed in 1729, is known for its perfect sound despite having only wooden pipes.

The church has been protected by the state as an important historical monument since 1892. In 1985, the Slovak National Council (parliament) proclaimed it a National Historical Monument. An expensive reconstruction followed in the 1990s.

The church is one of only five Lutheran wooden churches remaining in Slovakia. The others are situated in Hronsek, Istebné, Leštiny, and Svätý Kríž near Liptovská Mara.

== Notes and sources ==
=== Sources ===
- Baráthová, Nora (2003), Historické objekty: Drevený artikulárny kostol (in Slovak), Kezmarok town website (in WebArchive).
- Porubän, Roman (2022), Die Hölzerne Artikulatkirche, Kežmarok: Jadro ISBN 978-80-89426-75-1
