= Wooden articular church of Leštiny =

- Drevený artikulárny kostol v Leštiniach
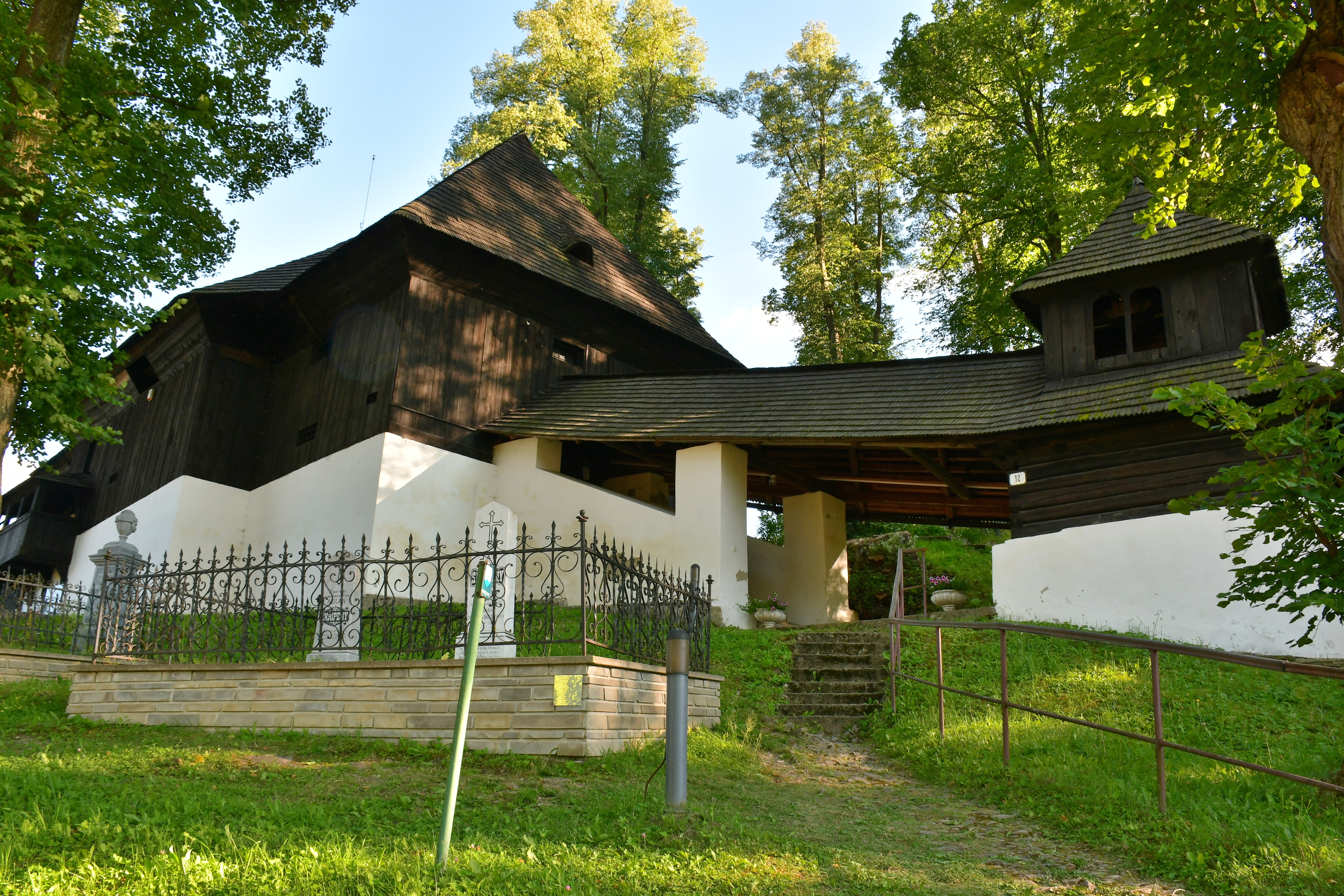
- Wooden articular church of Leštiny

Religion
- Affiliation: Lutheranism
- District: Dolný Kubín
- Region: Žilina

Location
- Location: Leštiny
- Country: Slovakia
- Interactive map of Wooden articular church of Leštiny
- Coordinates: 49.188°N 19.348917°E

Architecture
- Type: Church
- Completed: 1688
- Wooden articular church of Leštiny

UNESCO World Heritage Site
- Part of: Wooden Churches of the Slovak part of the Carpathian Mountain Area
- Criteria: Cultural: (iii), (iv)
- Reference: 1273-004
- Inscription: 2008 (32nd Session)

The wooden articular church of Leštiny is a Lutheran church in the village of Leštiny, Slovakia.

== History ==
The church was constructed between 1688 and 1689 on the demand de Jóba Zmeškala, captain of guards of Orava Castle. The initial building had neither a tower nor bells. In the year 1770, it was renovated and the facade was covered by wooden planks. In 1775, the interior was renovated and the paintings created during the end of 17th century were replaced by new ones. The bell tower was erected in 1877 and linked with a closed stair.

On July 7, 2008, the church, along with seven other monuments, was declared a UNESCO world heritage site under the name "Wooden Churches of the Slovak part of the Carpathian Mountain Area".
