= Church of Saint-Francis of Assisi =

- Kostol svätého Františka z Assisi
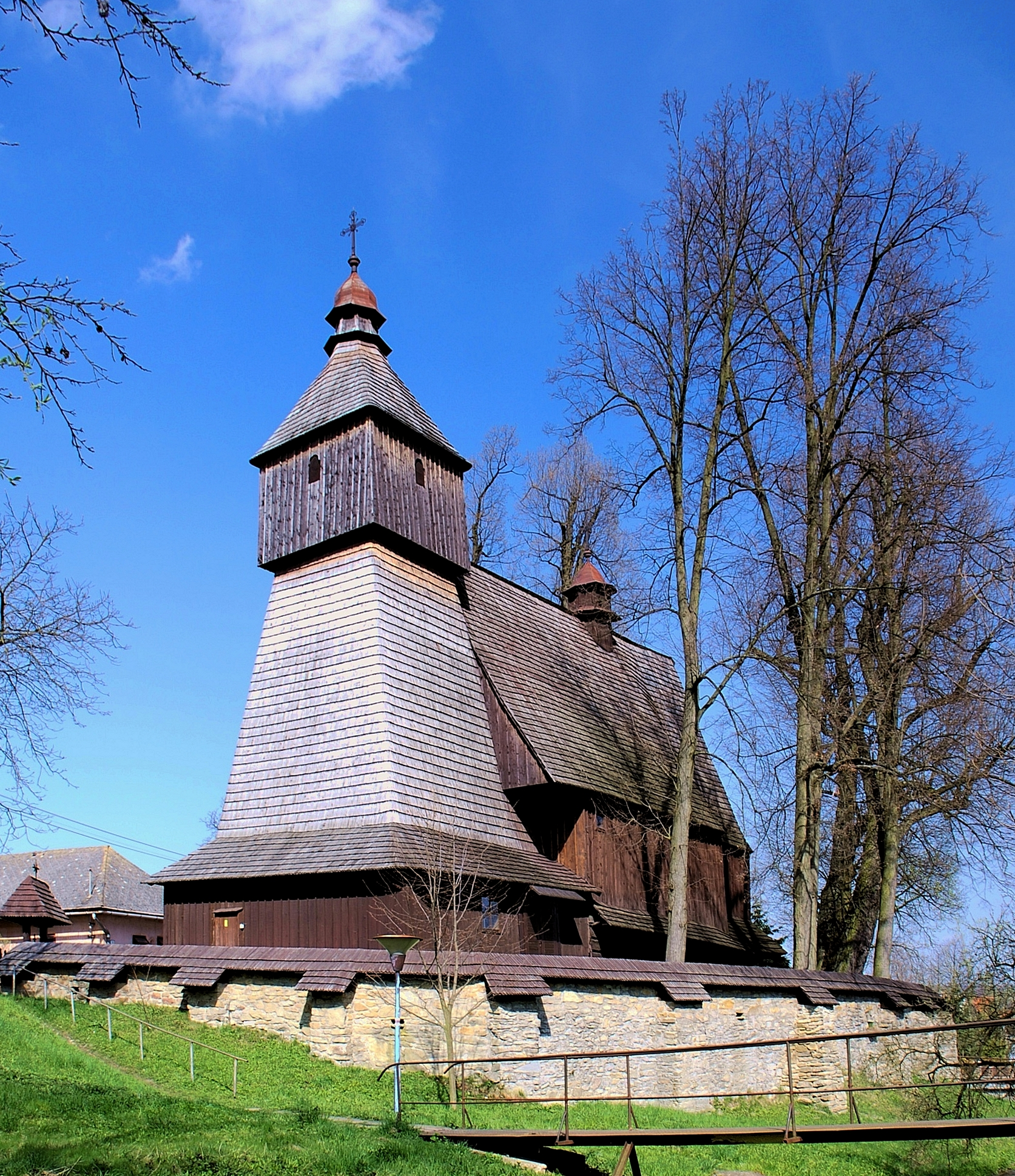
- Church of Saint-Francis of Assisi

Religion
- Affiliation: Roman Catholic
- Region: Prešov
- Leadership: Roman Catholic Archdiocese of Košice

Location
- Location: Hervartov
- Country: Slovakia
- Interactive map of Church of Saint-Francis of Assisi
- Coordinates: 49.246667°N 21.203611°E

Architecture
- Type: Church
- Completed: end of 15th century
- Church of Saint-Francis of Assisi

UNESCO World Heritage Site
- Part of: Wooden Churches of the Slovak part of the Carpathian Mountain Area
- Criteria: Cultural: (iii), (iv)
- Reference: 1273-001
- Inscription: 2008 (32nd Session)

Church of Saint-Francis of Assisi is a Roman Catholic church situated in the village of Hervartov.

== History ==
The church was constructed in wood at the end of 15th century. The wall paintings date between 1655 and 1805.

On July 7, 2008, the church along with seven other monuments was declared UNESCO world heritage site under the name "Wooden Churches of the Slovak part of the Carpathian Mountain Area".

The Wooden Church of St. Francis of Assisi is the oldest and best-preserved Gothic wooden church in Slovakia. Built in the late 15th century from local spruce and yew wood and covered with hand-split shingles, a testament to the village’s long carpentry tradition. The church has remained virtually unchanged for over five centuries. The interior was decorated with wall paintings in the 17th and 18th centuries, covering much of the interior surfaces with biblical scenes, saints and devotional imagery including Adam and Eve, St. George slaying the dragon, and a well-preserved Last Supper. There are late-Gothic carved altars dedicated to St. Catherine, the Virgin Mary and St. Barbara.
