= Church of All Saints of Tvrdošín =

UNESCO World Heritage Site in Slovakia

Church of All Saints
- Kostol Všetkých svätých
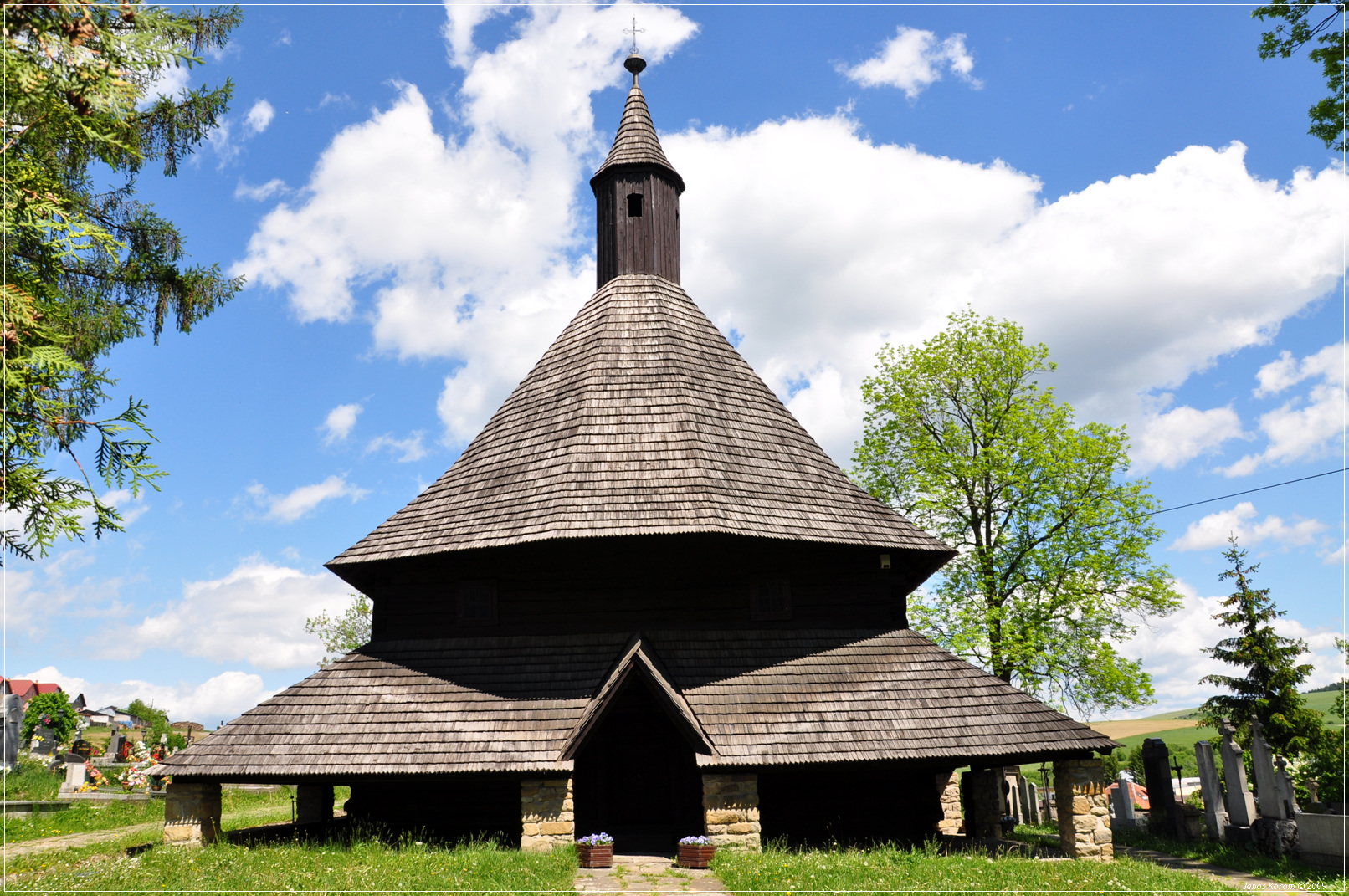
- Church of All Saints of Tvrdošín

Religion
- Affiliation: Roman Catholic
- Region: Žilina
- Leadership: Roman Catholic Diocese of Spiš

Location
- Location: Tvrdošín
- Country: Slovakia
- Interactive map of Church of All Saints
- Coordinates: 49.336667°N 19.559167°E

Architecture
- Type: Church
- Completed: 15th century
- Church of All Saints of Tvrdošín

UNESCO World Heritage Site
- Part of: Wooden Churches of the Slovak part of the Carpathian Mountain Area
- Criteria: Cultural: (iii), (iv)
- Reference: 1273-002
- Inscription: 2008 (32nd Session)

Church of All Saints is a Roman Catholic situated in the city of Tvrdošín.

== History ==
The church was constructed in 15th century, some sources claim the construction date around the end of 14th century . It was reconstructed in renaissance style in the 17th century.

On July 7, 2008, the church along with seven other monuments was declared UNESCO world heritage site under the name "Wooden Churches of the Slovak part of the Carpathian Mountain Area".
