= Church of Saint-Nicolas of Bodružal =

Church in Bodružal, Slovakia

- Chrám svätého Mikuláša
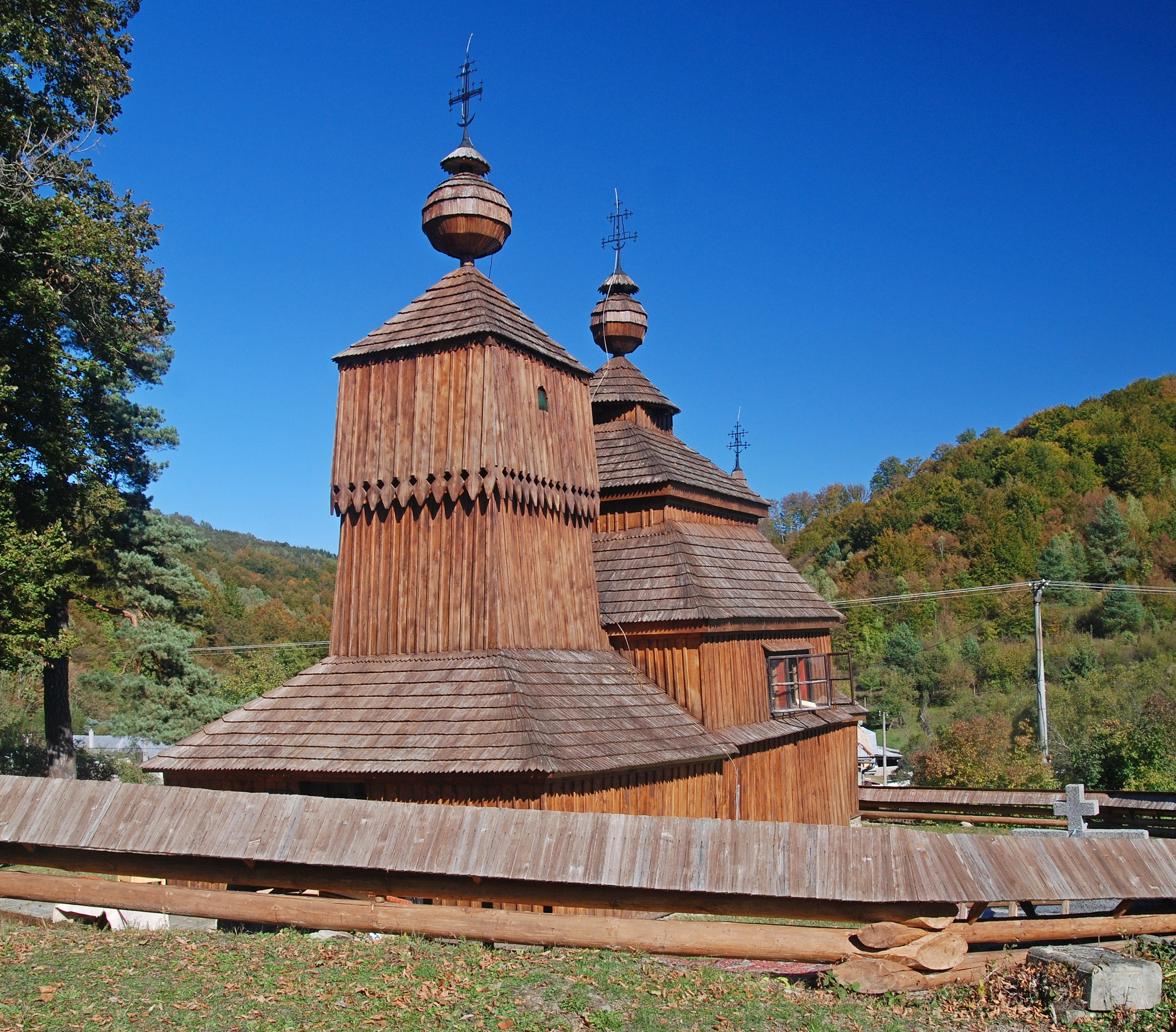
- Church of Saint-Nicolas of Bodružal

Religion
- Affiliation: Slovak Greek Catholic Church
- District: Svidník
- Region: Košice
- Leadership: Slovak Catholic Metropolitan Archeparchy of Prešov
- Year consecrated: 1658

Location
- Location: Bodružal
- Country: Slovakia
- Interactive map of Church of Saint-Nicolas of Bodružal
- Coordinates: 49.354167°N 21.707222°E

Architecture
- Type: Church
- Church of Saint-Nicolas of Bodružal

UNESCO World Heritage Site
- Part of: Wooden Churches of the Slovak part of the Carpathian Mountain Area
- Criteria: Cultural: (iii), (iv)
- Reference: 1273-007
- Inscription: 2008 (32nd Session)

Church of Saint-Nicolas of Bodružal is a Greek-catholic church situated in the village of Bodružal.

== History ==
The church was constructed in wood in 1658 by the parishioners. On July 7, 2008, the church along with seven other monuments was declared UNESCO world heritage site under the name "Wooden Churches of the Slovak part of the Carpathian Mountain Area".

A striking Greek-Catholic, three-room wooden church from 1658. Its distinctive shingle roof features three small towers, each crowned with onion domes and wrought-iron crosses symbolizing the Holy Trinity. The church is complemented by a separate bell tower, a wooden fence and an entrance gate topped with an onion dome. The interior of the church consists of a three-part layout, comprising the vestibule (Narthex/Entrance), nave (Central worship area, where the congregation sits), and the sanctuary (the Altar where only clergy are allowed, separated from the nave by an iconostasis (a decorated screen with icons), which reflects the traditional tripartite structure common in Greek Catholic churches. This structure is symbolizing the Holy Trinity.

One of the most striking features is the Baroque-style iconostasis, adorned with intricately carved floral and geometric patterns, it holds a series of hand-painted icons depicting Christ, the Virgin Mary, and various saints. It demonstrates the skill of 17th and 18th-century artisans who combined Byzantine iconography with local folk motifs. It is further unique in that it is decorated on both sides which appears to be the only version of this in Slovakia.

The central royal doors in the center of the iconostasis are double-winged, gilded and richly carved. The first row contains icons, from left: Baptism of Christ, Mother of God with Jesus in her arms, Christ the Teacher and the patron saint of the church, Saint Nicholas. In the second row in the center is the Last Supper. To the left of the altar is a painting from the 18th century of the Last Judgement. The pews, pulpit, and choir loft are designed with subtle carvings, reflecting the same attention to detail as the iconostasis.
