= Church of Saint Michael the Archangel of Ladomirová =

- Chrám svätého Michala Archanjela
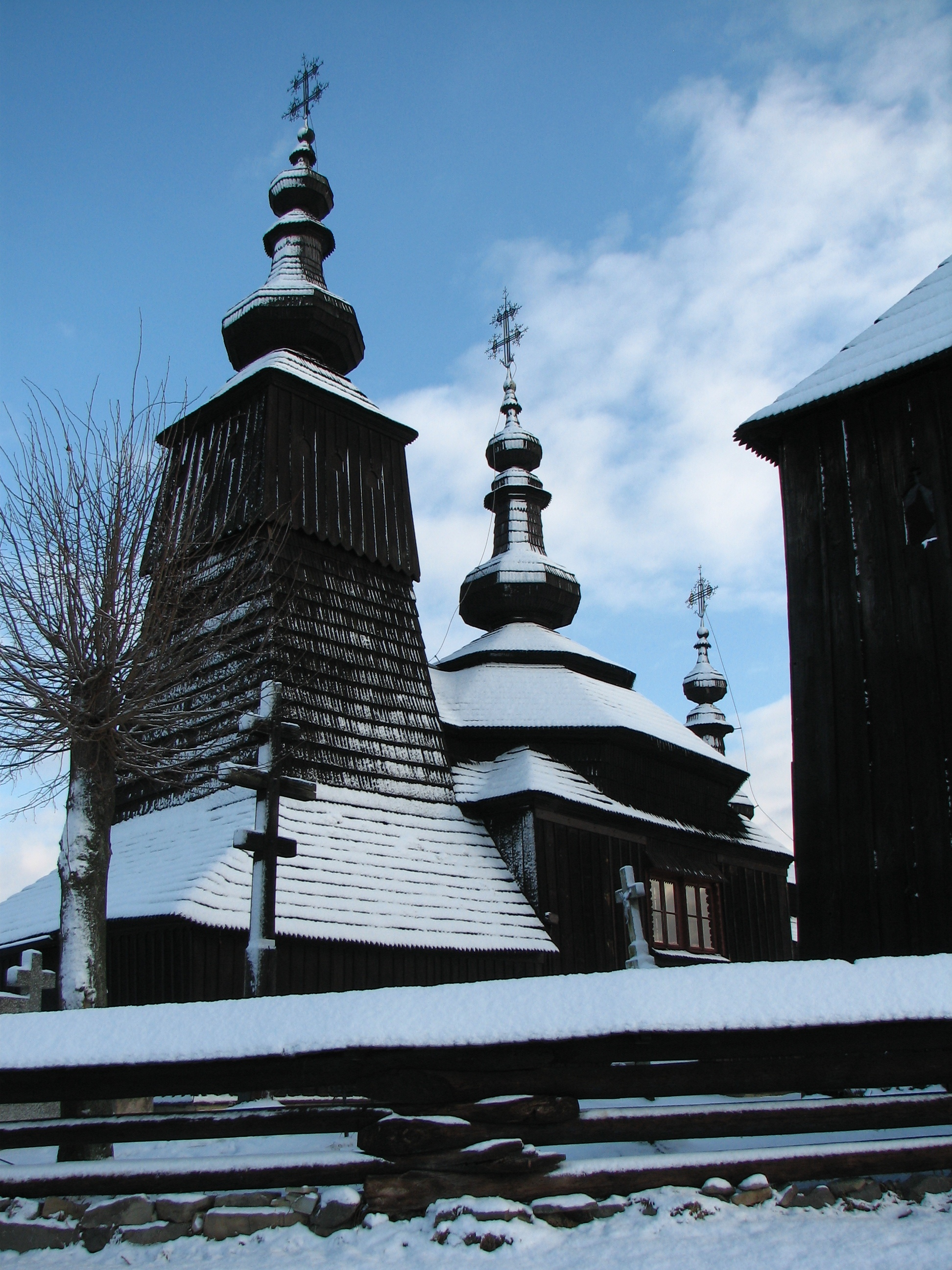
- Church of Saint Michael the Archangel of Ladomirová

Religion
- Affiliation: Slovak Greek Catholic Church
- District: Svidník
- Region: Prešov
- Leadership: Slovak Catholic Metropolitan Archeparchy of Prešov

Location
- Location: Ladomirová
- Country: Slovakia
- Interactive map of Church of Saint Michael the Archangel of Ladomirová
- Coordinates: 49.328333°N 21.626389°E

Architecture
- Type: Church
- Completed: 1742
- Church of Saint Michael the Archangel of Ladomirová

UNESCO World Heritage Site
- Part of: Wooden Churches of the Slovak part of the Carpathian Mountain Area
- Criteria: Cultural: (iii), (iv)
- Reference: 1273-008
- Inscription: 2008 (32nd Session)

Church of Saint Michael the Archangel of Ladomirová is a Greek-catholic church situated in the village of Ladomirová.

== History ==
An earlier church is believed to have existed in this place in 1600. The current church was constructed in wood in 1742. On July 7, 2008, the church along with seven other monuments was declared UNESCO world heritage site under the name "Wooden Churches of the Slovak part of the Carpathian Mountain Area".
