= Articular church =

Wooden churches for Evangelical congregations in Slovakia

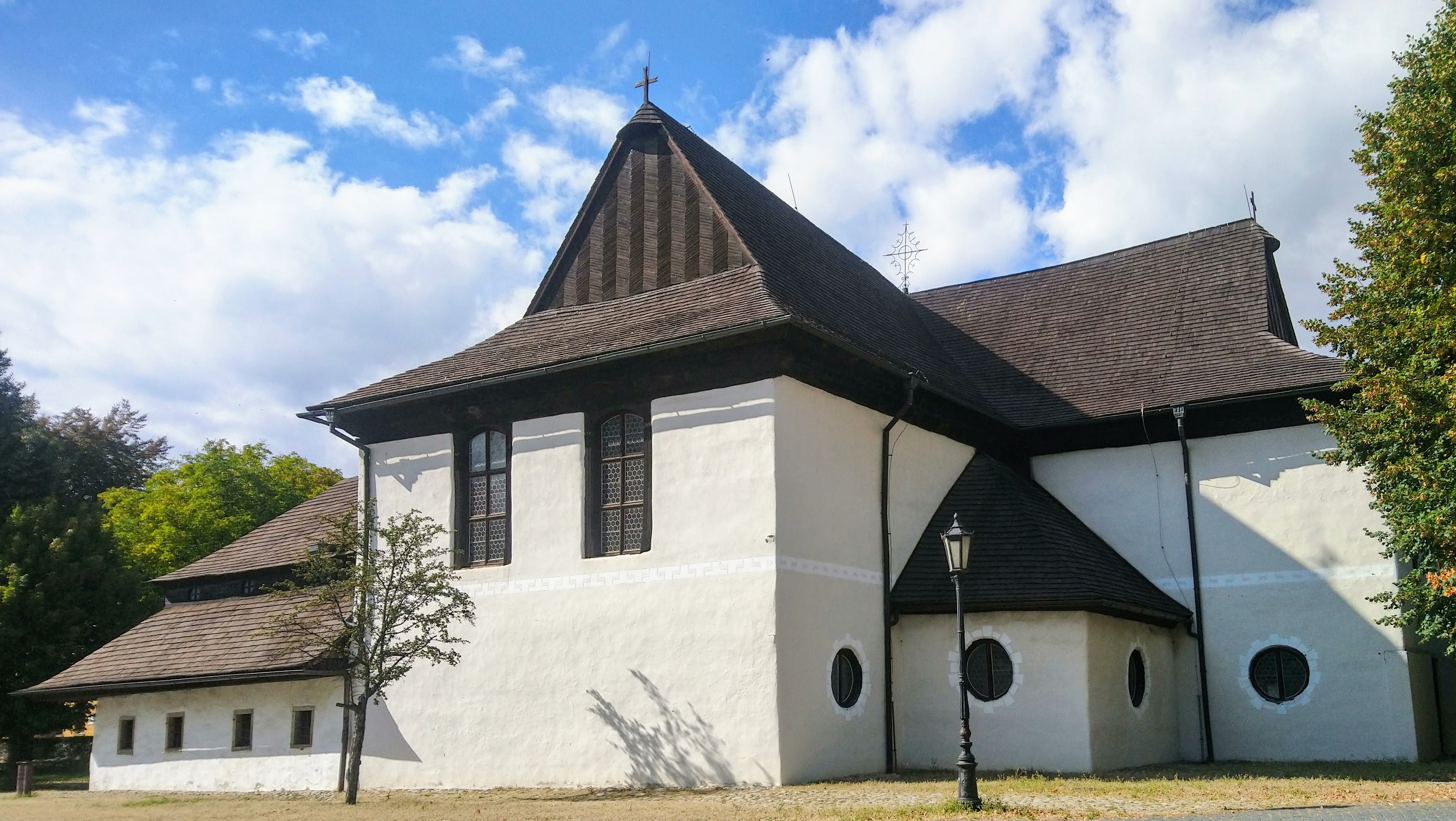
Kežmarok articular church

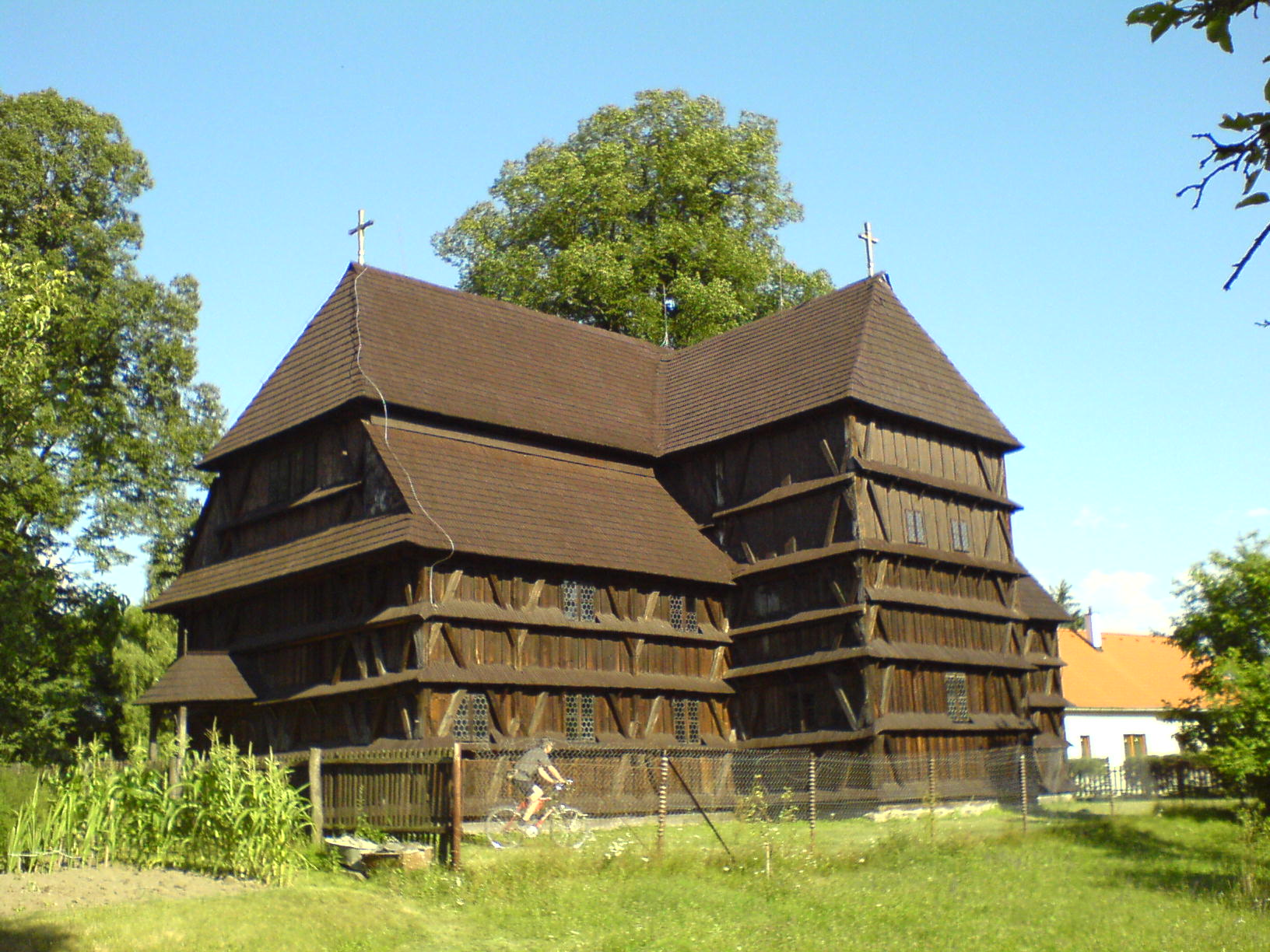
The articular church in Hronsek

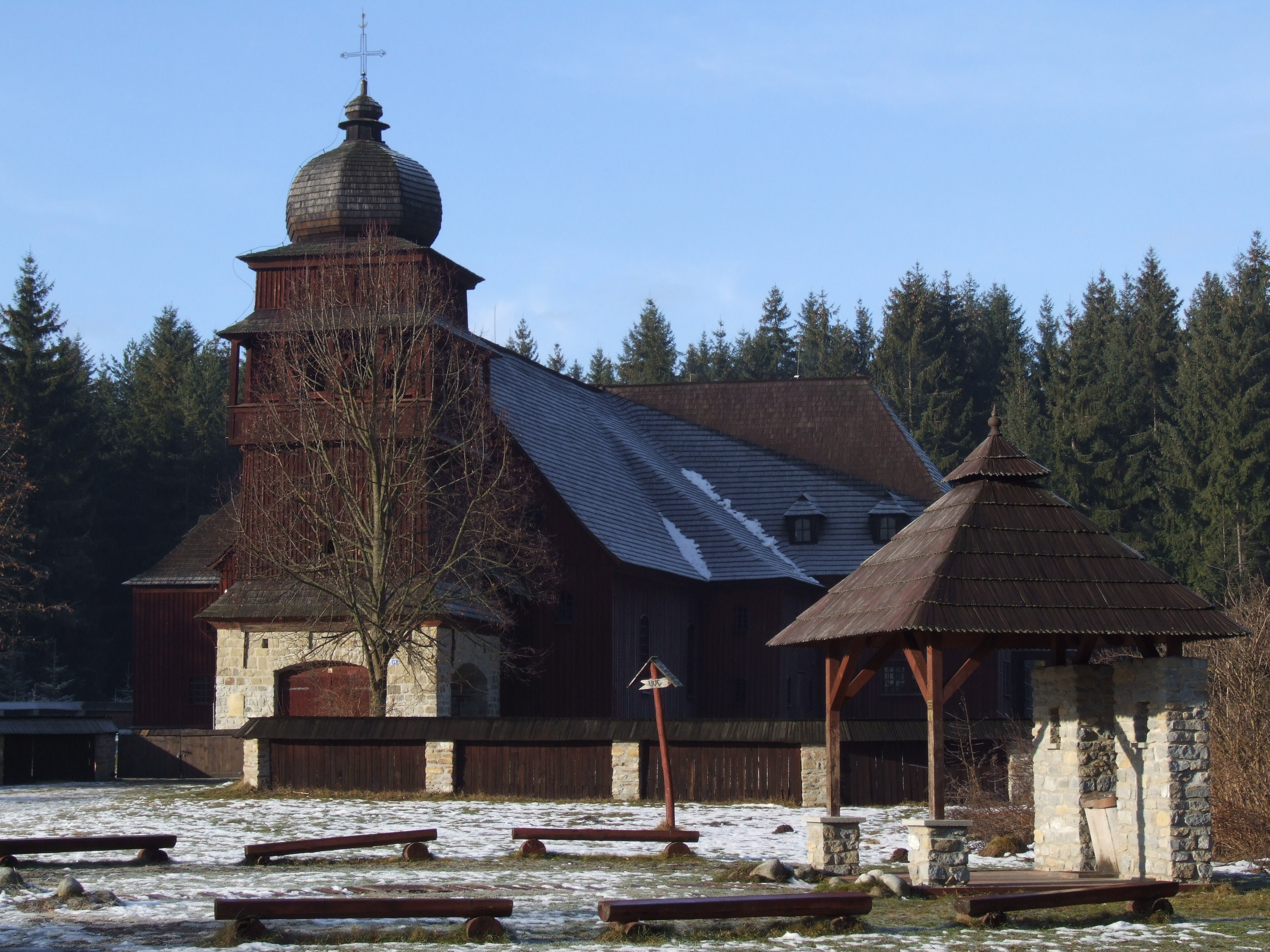
The articular church in Svätý Kríž

Articular churches are wooden churches for Evangelical congregations in Slovakia erected under the terms of the Congress of Sopron of 1681. At this congress, summoned by the Habsburg Emperor Leopold I, permission was for the first time granted for followers of the Augsburg and Calvinist confessions to erect and maintain churches within the Emperor's dominions within the Kingdom of Hungary. As this permission was contained in Articles (i.e. clauses) 25 and 26 of the Congress's deliberations, the term 'articular' was applied to them.

== Background ==
The Sopron Congress was called against a background of social unrest, including civil revolt, religious friction and continuing threat of invasion from Turkey. The Emperor therefore determined that it was necessary to make concessions to his Protestant population to secure its loyalty.

However, severe restrictions were placed on the Protestant congregations. No more than two churches could be built in each administrative region (county)— in areas of strategic importance, the limit was one church — and buildings had to be outside city walls. Further regulations determined siting, and building procedures. As a consequence, the articular churches were all built of wood, mostly in the period 1681–1730. There were originally 38 such churches, nearly all located in the region of today's Slovakia.

Many of the churches displayed extraordinary ingenuity in their construction. They were typically decorated within by painting, often of a trompe-l'œil nature giving the impression of marble columns or drapery.

== The articular churches today ==
Five articular churches survive today in Slovakia. Perhaps the most well-known is the church in Kežmarok, built between 1718 and 1730 under the direction of Juraj Müttermann, replacing an earlier structure of 1687. Others are at Leštiny (1689, restored 1860s), Hronsek (1725-6, a wood-framed structure now without internal wall-paintings), Istebné (built between 1686 and 1731) and Svätý Kríž (about 1693). The latter church was originally located at the village of Paludza, which was submerged in the Liptovská Mara reservoir in the late 1970s. Between 1974 and 1977 the church was carefully dismantled and restored before being rebuilt in Svätý Kríž, where it was reconsecrated in 1982. The churches in Kežmarok, Leštiny and Hronsek are now part of a UNESCO World Heritage Site called Wooden churches of the Slovak Carpathians, declared in 2008.

The articular church at Spišská Nová Ves was dismantled in 1924, but some of its decorations, including a 17th-century retable depicting the mines and miners who brought the Spiš region much of its wealth, are preserved in the museum at Spišská Sobota.
