= Hervartov =

- Municipality
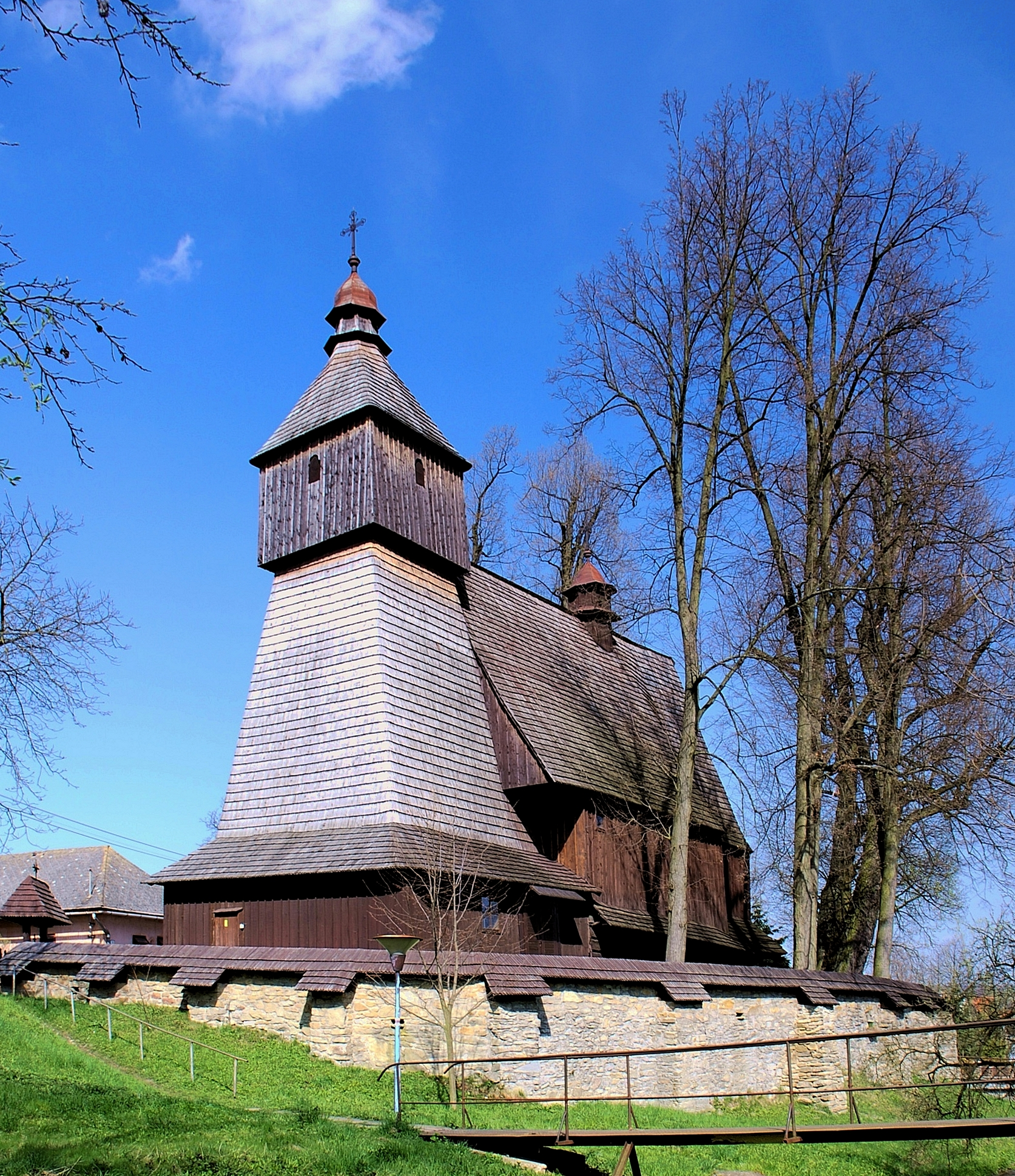
- Wooden church in Hervartov

- Flag

- Location of Hervartov in the Prešov Region Location of Hervartov in Slovakia
- Coordinates: 49.25°N 21.20°E
- Country: Slovakia
- Region: Prešov Region
- District: Bardejov District
- First mentioned: 1406

Area
  - Total: 9.87 km^{2} (3.81 sq mi)
- Elevation: 450 m (1,480 ft)

Population (2025)
  - Total: 522
- Time zone: UTC+1 (CET)
  - Summer (DST): UTC+2 (CEST)
- Postal code: 862 2
- Area code: +421 54
- Vehicle registration plate (until 2022): BJ
- Website: www.hervartov.sk

Hervartov (Hungarian: Hervartó) is a village and municipality in Bardejov District in the Prešov Region of north-east Slovakia.

== History ==
In historical records the village was first mentioned in 1406. The wooden church in the village was built around 1500 and is a Roman Catholic wooden church. It has beautiful frescoes inside and due to its cultural and historical value it was declared a UNESCO World Heritage Site in 2008.

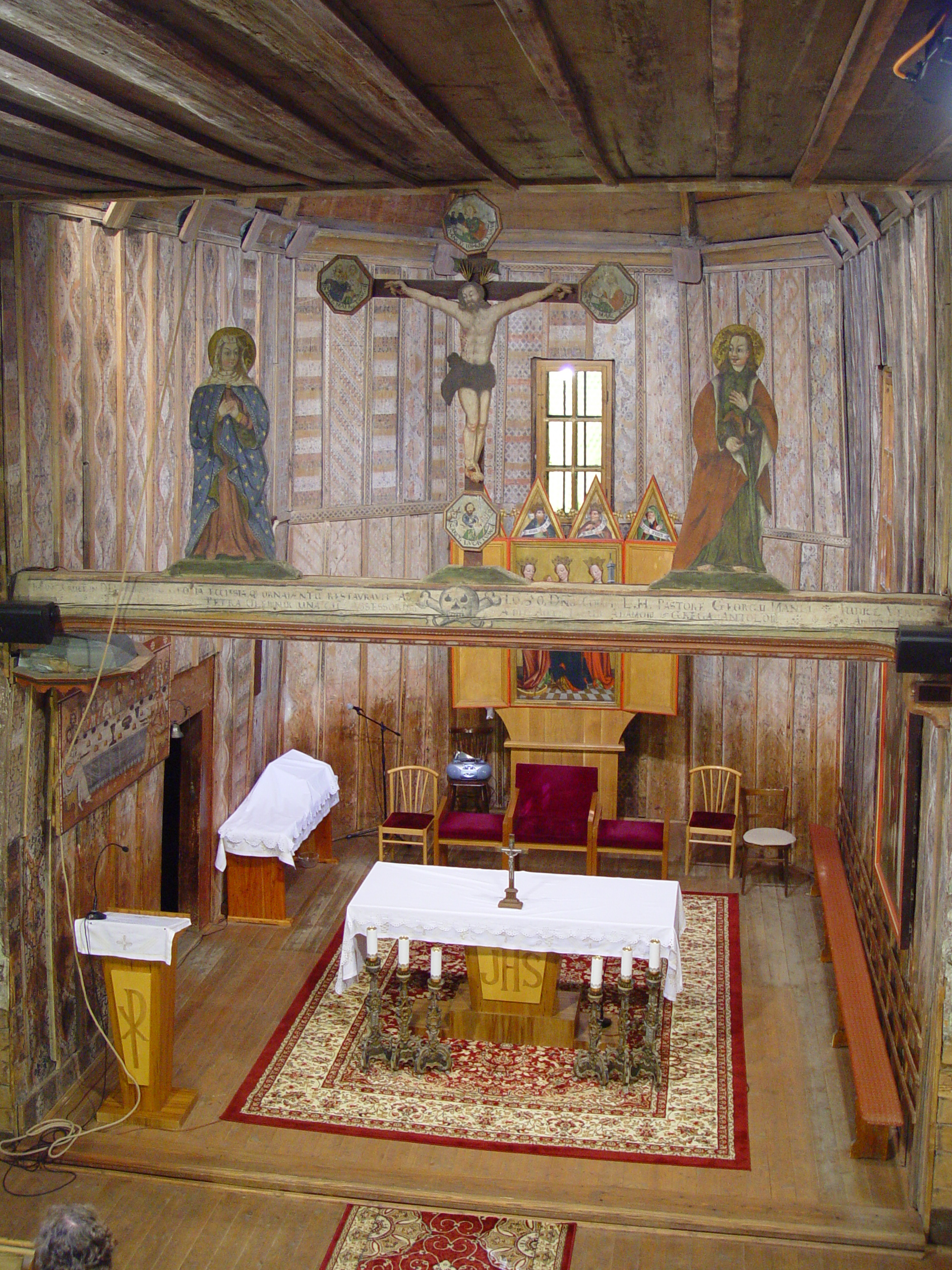
Inner view of the wooden church in Hervartov

== Geography ==
The municipality lies at an altitude of 450 metres (1,480 ft) and covers an area of 9.87 km^{2} (3.81 sq mi) (2025).

== Population ==
Population statistic (10 years)
Year	1995	2005	2015	2025
Count	497	504	497	522
Difference		+1.40%	−1.38%	+5.03%

Population statistic
Year	2024	2025
Count	518	522
Difference		+0.77%

It has a population of 522 people (31 December 2025).

=== Ethnicity ===
Census 2021 (1+ %)
Ethnicity	Number	Fraction
Slovak	514	99.61%
Rusyn	10	1.93%
Total	516	

In year 2021 was 516 people by ethnicity 514 as Slovak, 10 as Rusyn and 5 as Not found out.

Note on population: The difference values of population numbers in the table "Population statistic" and in the sections "Ethnicity" & "Religion" is caused by the use of various statistical methods.

=== Religion ===
Census 2021 (1+ %)
Religion	Number	Fraction
Roman Catholic Church	470	91.09%
Greek Catholic Church	26	5.04%
None	12	2.33%
Total	516	

In year 2021 was 516 people by religion 470 from Roman Catholic Church, 26 from Greek Catholic Church, 12 from None, 3 from Evangelical Church, 2 from Not found out, 1 from Eastern Orthodox Church, 1 from Other and not ascertained christian church and 1 from Christian Congregations in Slovakia.

== Genealogical resources ==
The records for genealogical research are available at the state archive "Statny Archiv in Presov, Slovakia"

- Roman Catholic church records (births/marriages/deaths): 1749-1897 (parish B)
- Greek Catholic church records (births/marriages/deaths): 1819-1938 (parish B)

== See also ==
- List of municipalities and towns in Slovakia
