= Hronsek =

Hronsek Garamszeg
- Municipality
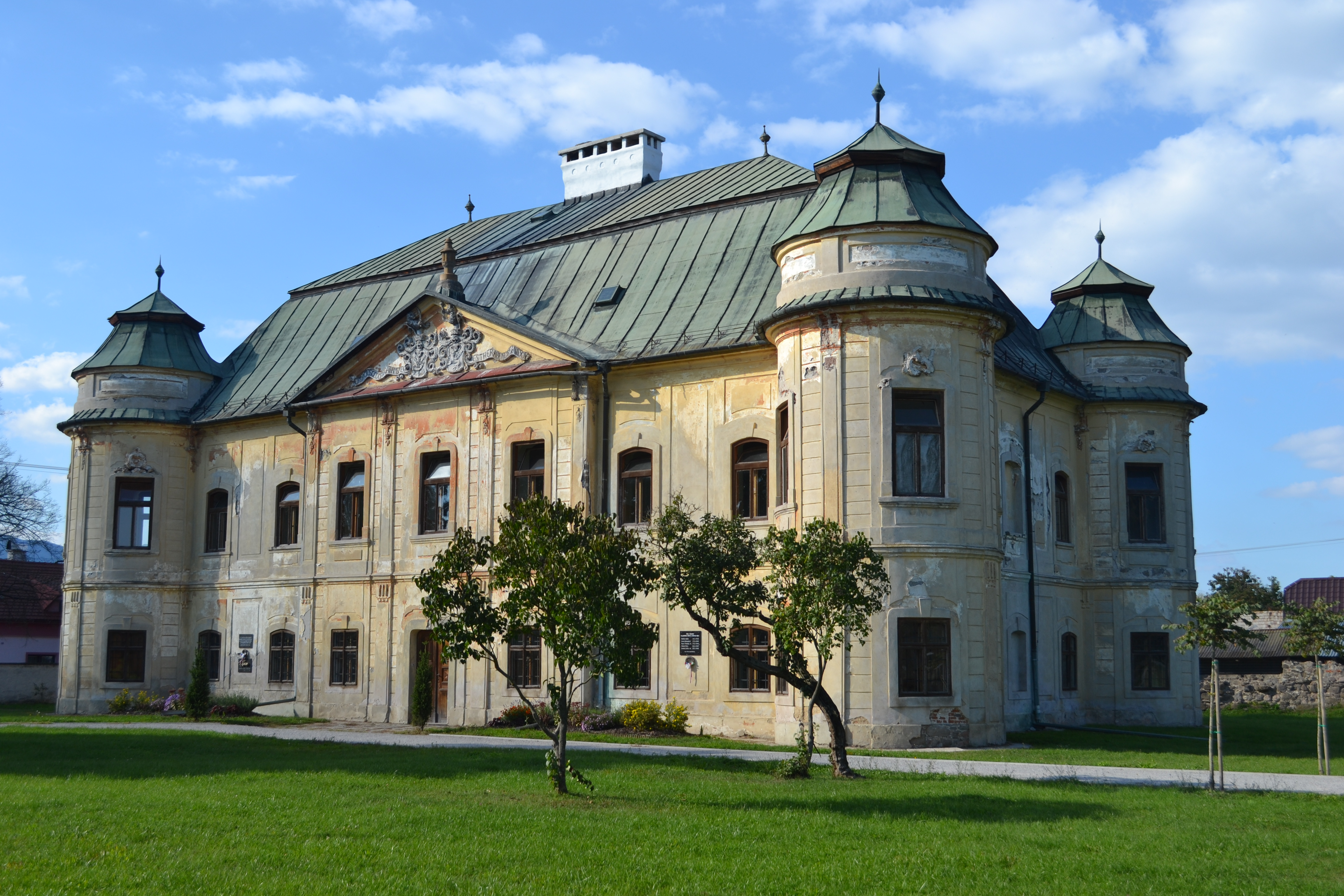
- Manor in Hronsek

- Flag

- Location of Hronsek in the Banská Bystrica Region Location of Hronsek in Slovakia
- Coordinates: 48.65°N 19.15°E
- Country: Slovakia
- Region: Banská Bystrica Region
- District: Banská Bystrica District
- First mentioned: 1500

Area
  - Total: 7.30 km^{2} (2.82 sq mi)
- Elevation: 309 m (1,014 ft)

Population (2025)
  - Total: 693
- Time zone: UTC+1 (CET)
  - Summer (DST): UTC+2 (CEST)
- Postal code: 976 31
- Area code: +421 48
- Vehicle registration plate (until 2022): BB
- Website: www.hronsek.sk

Hronsek (Hungarian: Garamszeg) is a village and municipality of the Banská Bystrica District in the Banská Bystrica Region of Slovakia.

== History ==
In historical records, the village was first mentioned in 1500, and it has changed its name many times during its History: (1500 Zyklafalu, 1506 Czwiklafalwa, 1514 Galoyczfalwa, 1515 Galowycz, 1522 Czwyklina, 1558 Czwyklina alias Galfalwa, 1565 Garanzk). It belonged to the district of Zvolen. From the 15th century, control of the town passed to the Prokopy family, later to the Soós and in the 17th century to the Géczy families.

== Geography ==
The municipality lies at an altitude of 309 metres (1,014 ft) and covers an area of 7.30 km^{2} (2.82 sq mi) (2025).

== Population ==
Population statistic (10 years)
Year	1995	2005	2015	2025
Count	563	627	667	693
Difference		+11.36%	+6.37%	+3.89%

Population statistic
Year	2024	2025
Count	662	693
Difference		+4.68%

It has a population of 693 people (31 December 2025).

=== Ethnicity ===
Census 2021 (1+ %)
Ethnicity	Number	Fraction
Slovak	639	97.7%
Not found out	12	1.83%
Total	654	

In year 2021 was 654 people by ethnicity 639 as Slovak, 12 as Not found out, 6 as Czech, 4 as Hungarian, 3 as Romani, 2 as Rusyn, 2 as Other, 1 as Russian, 1 as Austrian, 1 as French and 1 as Albanian.

Note on population: The difference values of population numbers in the table "Population statistic" and in the sections "Ethnicity" & "Religion" is caused by the use of various statistical methods.

=== Religion ===
Census 2021 (1+ %)
Religion	Number	Fraction
Roman Catholic Church	232	35.47%
None	227	34.71%
Evangelical Church	163	24.92%
Not found out	11	1.68%
Total	654	

In year 2021 was 654 people by religion 232 from Roman Catholic Church, 227 from None, 163 from Evangelical Church, 11 from Not found out, 6 from Greek Catholic Church, 4 from Paganism and natural spirituality, 4 from Ad hoc movements, 2 from Eastern Orthodox Church, 2 from Other, 1 from Christian Congregations in Slovakia, 1 from Islam and 1 from Buddhism.

== Wooden Church ==
Built in 1725–6, this articular church can hold as many as 1,100 worshippers in an amphitheatre-style arrangement. It is the only wooden church in Slovakia which exhibits Scandinavian architectural influences, for instance in the beam connections and the arrangement of the columns. How these features, which have contributed significantly to the structure's longevity, arrived in Hronsek is still a mystery.
