= Leštiny =

- Municipality
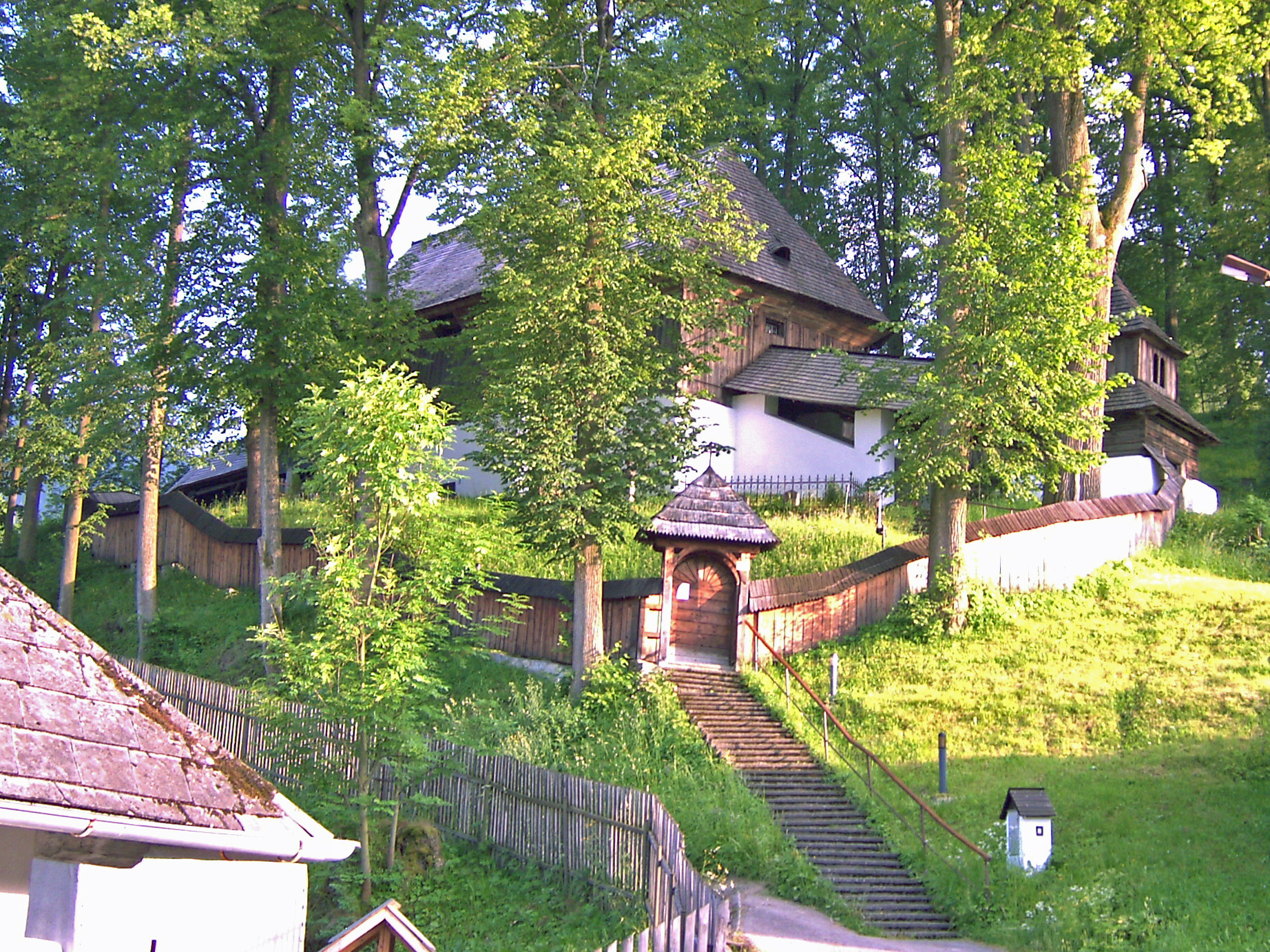
- Wooden articular church of Leštiny

- Flag

- Location of Leštiny in the Žilina Region Location of Leštiny in Slovakia
- Coordinates: 49.18°N 19.35°E
- Country: Slovakia
- Region: Žilina Region
- District: Dolný Kubín District
- First mentioned: 1381

Area
  - Total: 6.93 km^{2} (2.68 sq mi)
- Elevation: 581 m (1,906 ft)

Population (2025)
  - Total: 313
- Time zone: UTC+1 (CET)
  - Summer (DST): UTC+2 (CEST)
- Postal code: 270 1
- Area code: +421 43
- Vehicle registration plate (until 2022): DK
- Website: www.obeclestiny.sk

Leštiny (Hungarian: Lestin) is a village and municipality in Dolný Kubín District in the Žilina Region of northern Slovakia.

The village contains an Evangelical wooden church constructed in 1688-89 by local carpenters.

== History ==
In historical records the village was first mentioned in 1381. Before the establishment of independent Czechoslovakia in 1918, Leštiny was part of Árva County within the Kingdom of Hungary. From 1939 to 1945, it was part of the Slovak Republic.

== Geography ==
The municipality lies at an altitude of 581 metres (1,906 ft) and covers an area of 6.93 km^{2} (2.68 sq mi) (2025).

== Population ==
Population statistic (10 years)
Year	1995	2005	2015	2025
Count	224	228	272	313
Difference		+1.78%	+19.29%	+15.07%

Population statistic
Year	2024	2025
Count	308	313
Difference		+1.62%

It has a population of 313 people (31 December 2025).

=== Ethnicity ===
Census 2021 (1+ %)
Ethnicity	Number	Fraction
Slovak	289	97.63%
Not found out	8	2.7%
Czech	4	1.35%
Total	296	

In year 2021 was 296 people by ethnicity 289 as Slovak, 8 as Not found out, 4 as Czech, 2 as Moravian and 2 as Croatian.

Note on population: The difference values of population numbers in the table "Population statistic" and in the sections "Ethnicity" & "Religion" is caused by the use of various statistical methods.

=== Religion ===
Census 2021 (1+ %)
Religion	Number	Fraction
Evangelical Church	179	60.47%
Roman Catholic Church	75	25.34%
None	35	11.82%
Not found out	4	1.35%
Total	296	

In year 2021 was 296 people by religion 179 from Evangelical Church, 75 from Roman Catholic Church, 35 from None, 4 from Not found out, 1 from Eastern Orthodox Church, 1 from Greek Catholic Church and 1 from Buddhism.
