= Thomas Mauksch =

Carpathian German naturalist, botanist, pastor and wine merchant

Thomas Mauksch (20 December 1749 – 10 February 1832) was a Carpathian German naturalist, botanist, Lutheran pastor, and wine merchant.

He was the son of Tobias Mauksch, butcher in Késmárk in the Kingdom of Hungary (today Kežmarok, Slovakia), and his wife Anna-Maria born Toportzer. He studied at the gymnasia in Késmárk, Szikszó and Sárospatak and in the years 1772–1773 theology at the University of Leipzig.

Between 1776–1784 he was subrector and professor at the gymnasium in Késmárk. Subsequently he became Lutheran pastor in Bártfa (today Bardejov, Slovakia) between 1784 and 1786, and later in Nagyszalók (today Veľký Slavkov, Slovakia) from 1786 to 1802. In 1802 he returned to Kežmarok and traded in wine, tobacco and coffee, at times substituting for the Lutheran pastor there. He was friendly with Christian Augustini ab Hortis hu:Augustini ab Hortis Keresztély and it was under his influence that Samuel Genersich took up botany. He persuaded another friend, Count István Csáky to erect several guesthouses at the foot of the Tatra Mountains, thereby starting the settlement which became Altschmecks (today Starý Smokovec in Slovakia).

Mauksch devoted most of his scientific work to the botanical exploration of the Tatra Mountains. He kept meteorological records of the area for some fifty years. He also acted as a host and guide to visiting botanists, among them Robert Townson, Pál Kitaibel and Göran Wahlenberg.

Although many of his works are known only from manuscripts, he was regarded as the preeminent Hungarian botanist of his time. The genus Maukschia Cyperaceae was named for him by János Heuffel

== Works ==
Many of these were lost, are known from secondary sources or exist only as manuscripts.

- Über die gegenwärtige Geschichte und Verfassung der Sachsen in der Zips.Ung. Magazin, 1787.
- Flora Scepusii Septemtrionalis.
- Tentamen Florae Scepusii partim aliorum comitatuum.
- Verzeichniss der Zipser Pflanzen, die ich bis 1797 gesammelt habe. in P. Kitaibel Botanica geographica hungariae.
- Verzeichniss der nach Pest an Kitaibel eingeschickten Pflanzen.
- Verzeichniss der Pflanzen, die mir Wahlenberg von seine Reise mitbrachte, und die ich hier nicht fand oder verkannte.
- Index plantarum in Scepusio lectarum.
- Verzeichniss und Beschriebung der Carpatischen Blätterschämme (Agarici) im Zipser Comitat in Ungarn. Hrs. von G.C. Rumy sk:Karol Juraj Rumy in Isis 1834(A description of 112 mushrooms)
- Wegweiser durch die Zipser karpatischen Alpen. Hrs. von G.C. Rumy, 1826.
