= Veľký Slavkov =

- Municipality
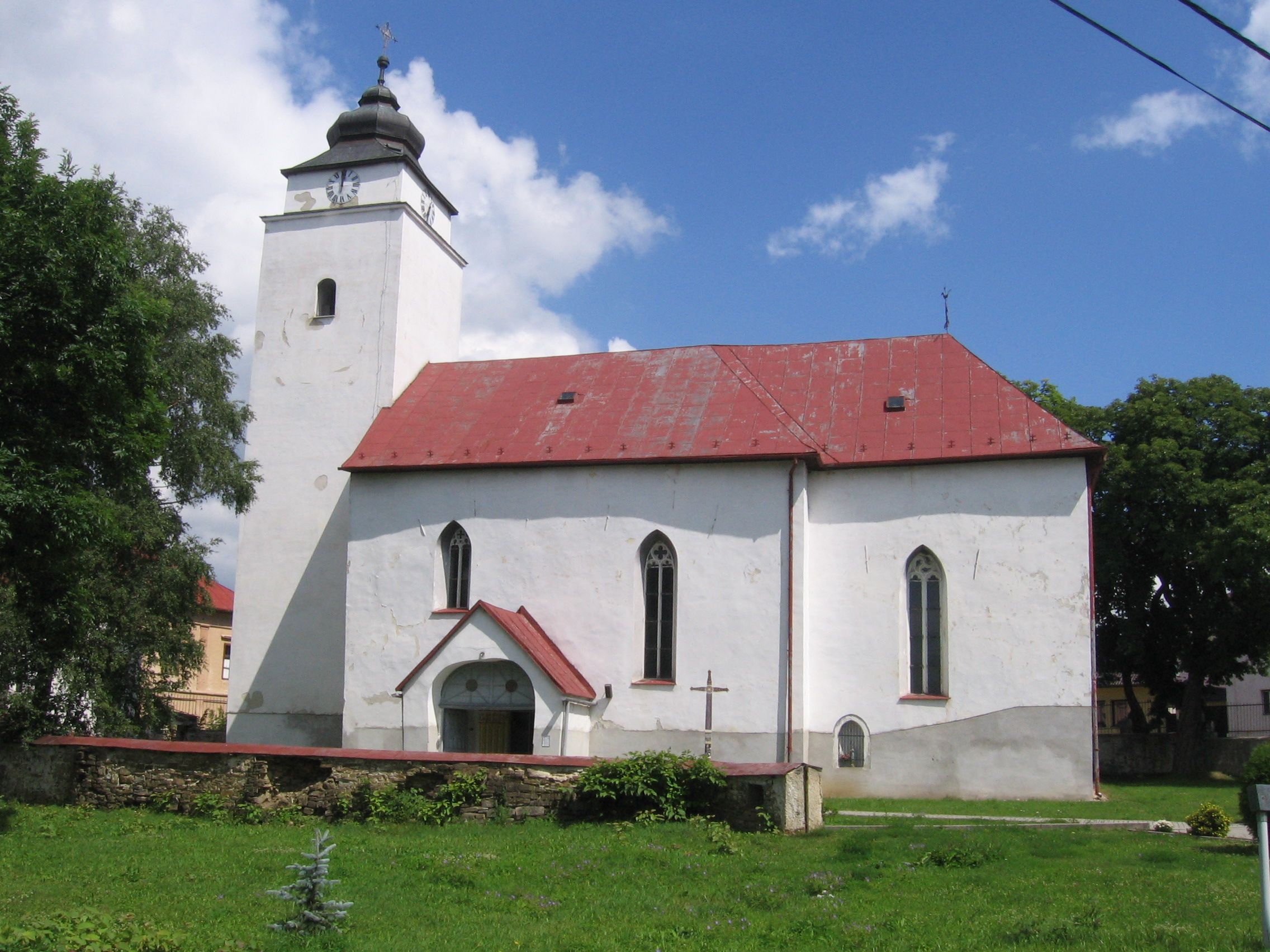

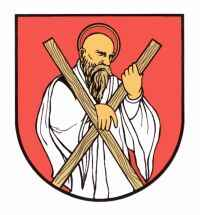
- Flag Coat of arms

- Location of Veľký Slavkov in the Prešov Region Location of Veľký Slavkov in Slovakia
- Coordinates: 49.10°N 20.28°E
- Country: Slovakia
- Region: Prešov Region
- District: Poprad District
- First mentioned: 1251

Area
  - Total: 12.21 km^{2} (4.71 sq mi)
- Elevation: 683 m (2,241 ft)

Population (2025)
  - Total: 1,551
- Time zone: UTC+1 (CET)
  - Summer (DST): UTC+2 (CEST)
- Postal code: 599 1
- Area code: +421 52
- Vehicle registration plate (until 2022): PP
- Website: www.velkyslavkov.sk

Veľký Slavkov (Hungarian: Nagyszalók, German: Groß Schlagendorf, Polish: Wielki Sławków) is a village and municipality in Poprad District in the Prešov Region of northern Slovakia.

== History ==
In historical records the village was first mentioned in 1251. It belonged to a German language island. The German population was expelled in 1945.

== Geography ==
The municipality lies at an altitude of 683 metres (2,241 ft) and covers an area of 12.21 km^{2} (4.71 sq mi) (2025).

== Population ==
Population statistic (10 years)
Year	1995	2005	2015	2025
Count	1072	1185	1337	1551
Difference		+10.54%	+12.82%	+16.00%

Population statistic
Year	2024	2025
Count	1518	1551
Difference		+2.17%

It has a population of 1551 people (31 December 2025).

=== Ethnicity ===
Census 2021 (1+ %)
Ethnicity	Number	Fraction
Slovak	1176	79.62%
Not found out	289	19.56%
Romani	53	3.58%
Total	1477	

In year 2021 was 1477 people by ethnicity 1176 as Slovak, 289 as Not found out, 53 as Romani, 13 as Czech, 9 as Rusyn, 3 as Polish, 3 as German, 3 as Other, 2 as Russian, 2 as Canadian, 1 as Ukrainian, 1 as Austrian and 1 as Moravian.

Note on population: The difference values of population numbers in the table "Population statistic" and in the sections "Ethnicity" & "Religion" is caused by the use of various statistical methods.

=== Religion ===
Census 2021 (1+ %)
Religion	Number	Fraction
Roman Catholic Church	794	53.76%
Not found out	276	18.69%
None	249	16.86%
Evangelical Church	75	5.08%
Greek Catholic Church	40	2.71%
Total	1477	

In year 2021 was 1477 people by religion 794 from Roman Catholic Church, 276 from Not found out, 249 from None, 75 from Evangelical Church, 40 from Greek Catholic Church, 12 from Christian Congregations in Slovakia, 10 from Eastern Orthodox Church, 6 from Ad hoc movements, 5 from Other, 2 from Other and not ascertained christian church, 2 from Buddhism, 2 from Apostolic Church, 1 from Jehovah's Witnesses, 1 from Islam, 1 from Hinduism and 1 from United Methodist Church.

== Economy and infrastructure ==
Its proximity to High Tatras have developed the village as a tourist destination. In Velký Slavkov are several pensions and a hotel.
