= Kežmarok =

Town in Slovakia

- Municipality
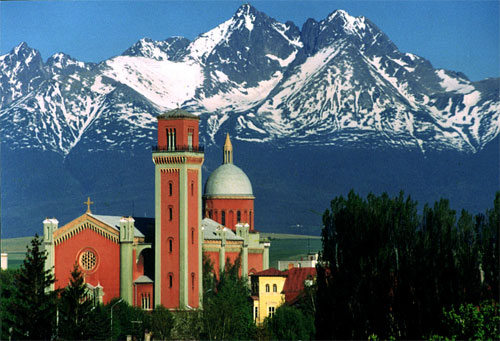
- Church in Kežmarok, Slovakia

- Flag Coat of arms

- Location of Kežmarok in the Prešov Region Location of Kežmarok in Slovakia
- Coordinates: 49.13°N 20.43°E
- Country: Slovakia
- Region: Prešov Region
- District: Kežmarok District
- First mentioned: 1251

Government
  - Mayor: Ján Ferenčák

Area
  - Total: 24.83 km^{2} (9.59 sq mi)
- Elevation: 627 m (2,057 ft)

Population (2025)
  - Total: 14,984
- Time zone: UTC+1 (CET)
  - Summer (DST): UTC+2 (CEST)
- Postal code: 600 1
- Area code: +421 52
- Vehicle registration plate (until 2022): KK
- Website: www.kezmarok.sk

Kežmarok (German: Kesmark or Käsmark; Hungarian: Késmárk, Rusyn: Кежмарок, Yiddish: קעזמאַרק, romanized: Kezmark, Polish: Kieżmark) is a town in the Spiš region of eastern Slovakia (population 16,000), on the Poprad River. Before World War I, it was in Szepes county in the Kingdom of Hungary.

== Geography ==
The municipality lies at an altitude of 627 metres (2,057 ft) and covers an area of 24.83 km^{2} (9.59 sq mi) (2025).

== History ==
Settlement at Kežmarok dates back to the Upper Stone Age. In the 13th century, the region contained a community of Saxons, a Slovak fishing village, a Hungarian border post, and a Carpathian German settlement. Its Latin name was first mentioned in 1251 as Villa (Saxonum apud Ecclesiam) Sancte Elisabeth. In 1269, Kežmarok received its town charter. It also had the right to organize a cheese market (hence the German name Kesmark ("Käsemarkt" - "cheese market"). In 1433, the town was severely damaged by a Hussite raid. After 1440, the count of Spiš had a seat in Kežmarok. In the 15th century (and then once more in 1655), Kežmarok became a free royal town.

The town was a stronghold of the noble Thököly family. The Hungarian magnate and warrior Imre Thököly was born in the town in 1657. He died in exile in Turkey in 1705, but in the 20th century his body was returned to Kežmarok and he is buried in a noble mausoleum in the town's Lutheran church.

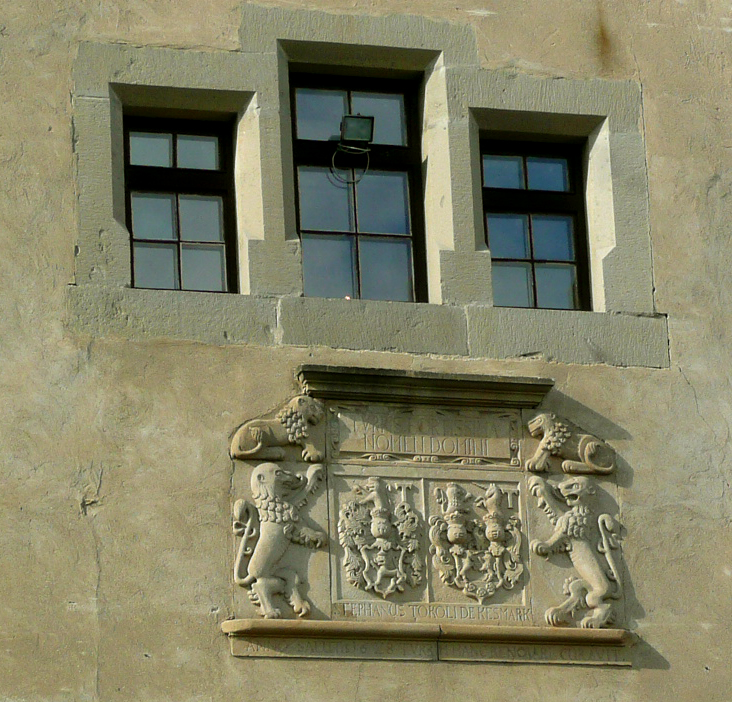
Coat of arms of the Thököly family.

The town's other monuments include a castle, many Renaissance merchant houses, and a museum of ancient books. In pride of place is the Protestant church built in 1688 entirely of wood. The church also contains an organ of 1719 with wooden pipes. The church has been a UNESCO World Heritage Site since 2008.

Before the establishment of independent Czechoslovakia in 1918, Kežmarok was part of Szepes County within the Kingdom of Hungary. From 1939 to 1945, it was part of the Slovak Republic. On 27 January 1945, the Red Army dislodged the Wehrmacht from Kežmarok in the course of the Western Carpathian offensive, and it was once again part of Czechoslovakia. Kežmarok had an ethnic German majority until around 1910, and Germans stayed a large minority until the end of World War II. Most Germans were evacuated to Germany or the Sudetenland before the arrival of the Red Army. The evacuation was mostly the initiative of Adalbert Wanhoff and prepared the diocese of the German Evangelical Church between mid-November 1944 and 21 January 1945. It also had a large and active Jewish community. During World War II, under the auspices of the First Slovak Republic, nearly 3,000 of the town's Jews were deported to German death camps. The town's pre-war Jewish cemetery has now been restored.

== Monuments ==
The town contains many historic monuments, including the Basilica of the Exaltation of the Holy Cross and the Wooden articular church in Kežmarok.

== Population ==
Historical population
Year	Pop.	±%
1970	9,917	—
1980	13,238	+33.5%
1991	16,339	+23.4%
2001	17,383	+6.4%
2011	16,832	−3.2%
2021	15,552	−7.6%
Source: Censuses

Population statistic (10 years)
Year	1995	2005	2015	2025
Count	17,190	17,165	16,558	14,984
Difference		−0.14%	−3.53%	−9.50%

Population statistic
Year	2024	2025
Count	15,145	14,984
Difference		−1.06%

It has a population of 14,984 people (31 December 2025).

=== Ethnicity ===
Census 2021 (1+ %)
Ethnicity	Number	Fraction
Slovak	14,151	90.99%
Not found out	1225	7.87%
Total	15,552	

In year 2021 was 15,552 people by ethnicity 14,151 as Slovak, 1225 as Not found out, 149 as Romani, 131 as Czech, 121 as Rusyn, 79 as German, 58 as Other, 48 as Polish, 35 as Hungarian, 27 as Russian, 20 as Ukrainian, 18 as Chinese, 14 as Vietnamese, 8 as Moravian, 7 as English, 5 as Croatian, 4 as Turkish, 4 as Italian, 4 as Canadian, 2 as Jewish, 2 as Austrian, 1 as Irish, 1 as Serbian and 1 as Romanian.

Note on population: The difference values of population numbers in the table "Population statistic" and in the sections "Ethnicity" & "Religion" is caused by the use of various statistical methods.

=== Religion ===
Census 2021 (1+ %)
Religion	Number	Fraction
Roman Catholic Church	10,013	64.38%
None	2632	16.92%
Not found out	1335	8.58%
Evangelical Church	680	4.37%
Greek Catholic Church	527	3.39%
Total	15,552	

In year 2021 was 15,552 people by religion 10,013 from Roman Catholic Church, 2632 from None, 1335 from Not found out, 680 from Evangelical Church, 527 from Greek Catholic Church, 66 from Eastern Orthodox Church, 63 from Ad hoc movements, 43 from Christian Congregations in Slovakia, 34 from Seventh-day Adventist Church, 33 from Other, 26 from Buddhism, 24 from Other and not ascertained christian church, 14 from Baptists Church, 13 from Paganism and natural spirituality, 12 from Calvinist Church, 12 from Apostolic Church, 7 from United Methodist Church, 5 from Jehovah's Witnesses, 4 from Islam, 2 from Hinduism, 2 from Church of Jesus Christ of Latter-day Saints, 1 from Jewish community, 1 from Old Catholic Church, 1 from Czechoslovak Hussite Church, 1 from Church of the Brethren and 1 from Bahá'i Community.

== Sport ==
The tradition of Kežmarok sports goes back deep into the past. The shooting club was founded here in 1510 and the building of its shooting range, many targets and commemorative items have been preserved to this day. In 1873, the Hungarian Carpathian Association was founded in the city, which was the first tourist organization in Hungary. Since the 1923/1924 season, the Kežmarok Carpathian Association, among other activities, organized a hockey cup competition in Starý Smokovec, which was one of the first in Slovakia.

- MŠK Kežmarok – city sport club
- MHK Kežmarok – ice-hockey club
- 1. MFK Kežmarok – football club
- KV MŠK Oktan Kežmarok – volleyball club
- CK MŠK Kežmarok – cycling club

== Twin towns – sister cities ==
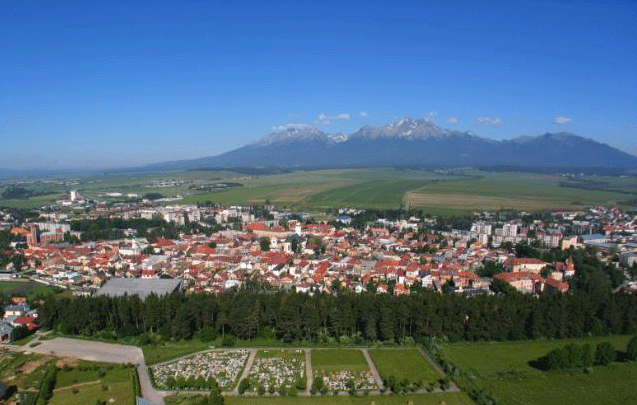
View from above

Kežmarok is twinned with:

- Bochnia, Poland
- Gliwice, Poland
- Hajdúszoboszló, Hungary
- Kupiškis, Lithuania
- Lanškroun, Czech Republic
- Lesneven, France
- Nowy Targ, Poland
- Příbram, Czech Republic
- Weilburg, Germany
- Zgierz, Poland

== Notable people ==
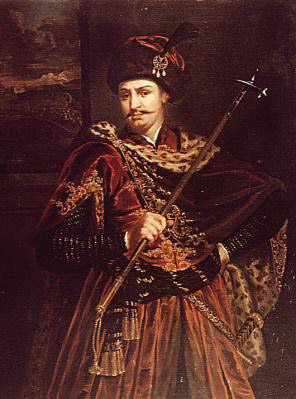
Emeric Thököly

- Vojtech Alexander (1857–1916), radiologist
- Tibor Gašpar (born 1962), the President of the police of Slovakia, 2012–2018
- Samuel Genersich (1768–1844), a Carpathian German physician and botanist
- Frigyes Ákos Hazslinszky (1818–1896), a Hungarian mycologist and botanist
- Juraj Herz (1934–2018), a Slovak film director and actor
- Baron Paul Kray of Krajova and Topolya (1735–1804), a soldier and general in Habsburg service
- Milan Lach (born 1973) a Slovak bishop of Rusyn ethnicity; the former bishop of the Ruthenian Catholic Eparchy of Parma
- Olbracht Łaski (died 1604), a Polish nobleman, an alchemist, and courtier
- Thomas Mauksch (1749–1832), a Carpathian German naturalist, botanist, and wine merchant
- Karl Sovanka (1893–1961), painter and sculptor
- Emeric Thököly (1657–1705), a Hungarian nobleman, Prince of Transylvania

=== Sport ===
- Ľuboš Bartečko (born 1976), ice hockey player
- Jana Gantnerová-Šoltýsová (born 1959), alpine skier
- Karol Itauma, (born 2000), boxer
- Moses Itauma, (born 2004), boxer
- Peter Škantár (born 1982) and Ladislav Škantár (born 1983), slalom canoeists, joint gold medallists at the 2016 Summer Olympics
- Natália Šubrtová (born 1989), alpine skier, sighted guide, and eleven-time Paralympic Champion
- Radoslav Suchy (born 1976), ice hockey player
- Adam Žampa (born 1990) and Andreas Žampa (born 1993), Olympic alpine ski racers

== Gallery ==
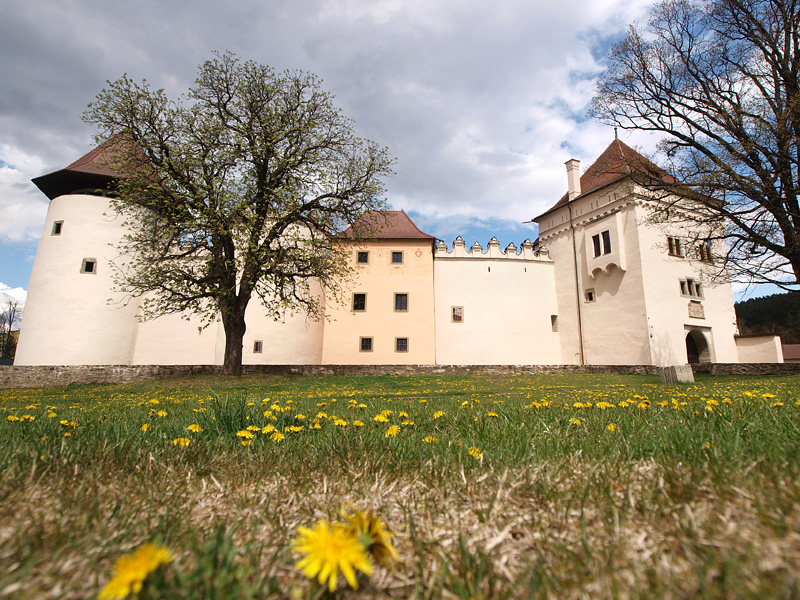
Castle

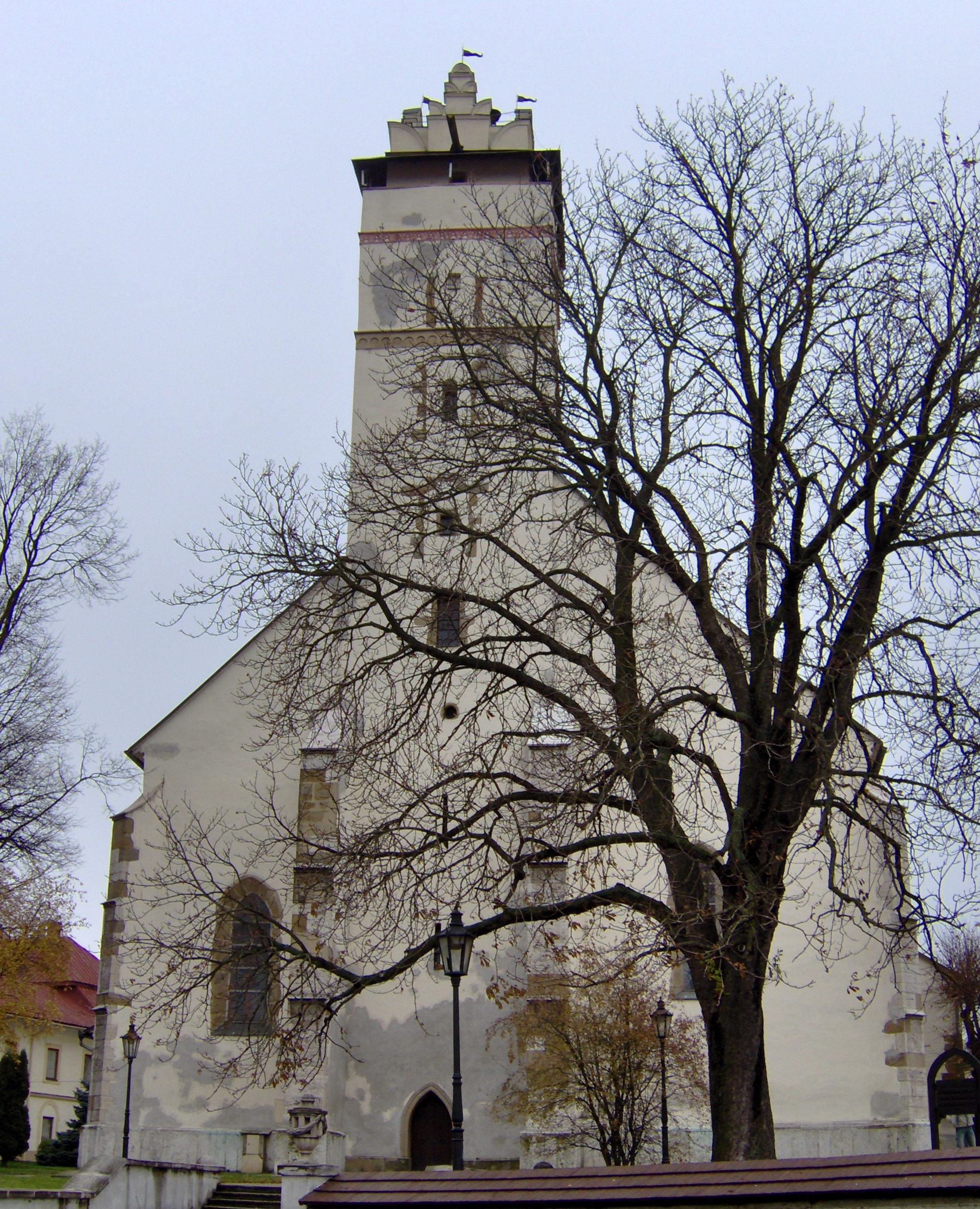
Basilica of the Exaltation of the Holy Cross

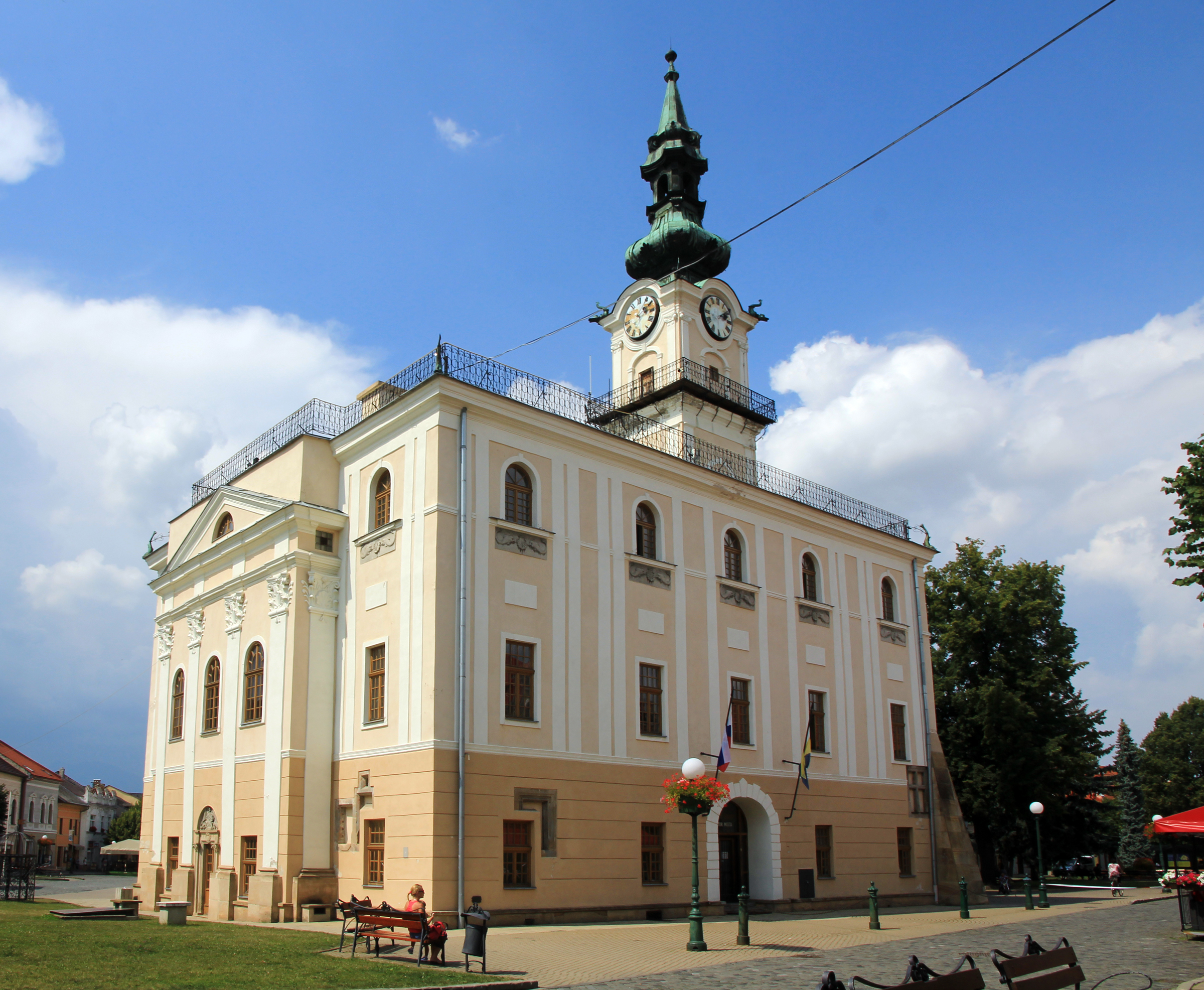
Town hall

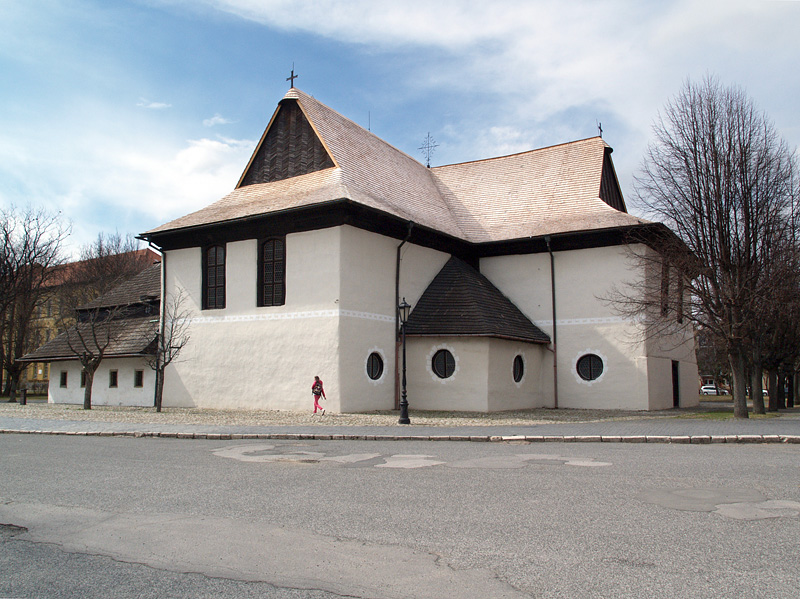
Wooden articular church

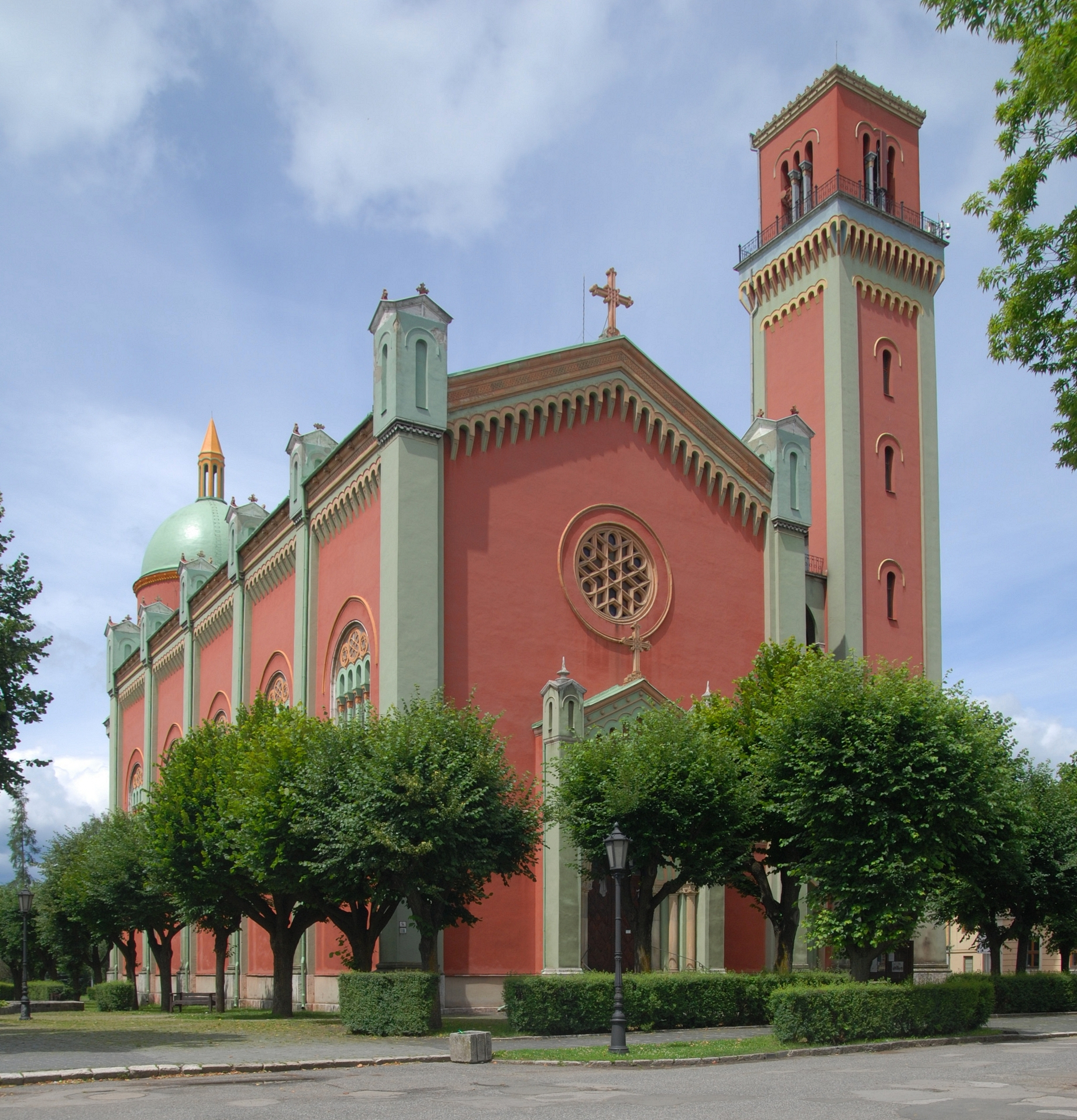
New protestant church

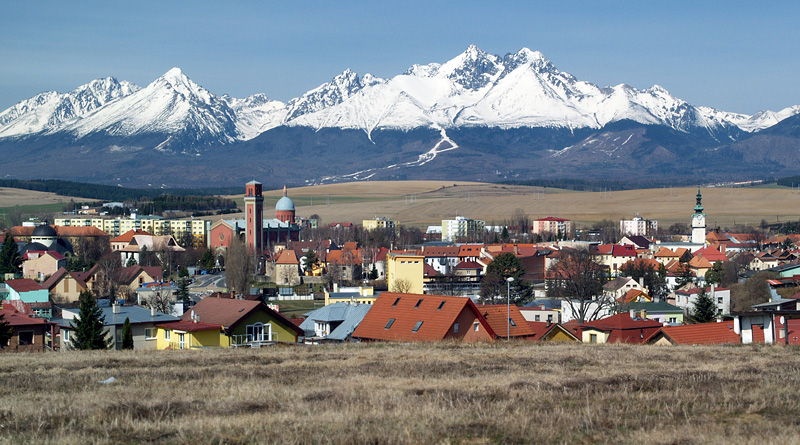
View of Kežmarok with High Tatras

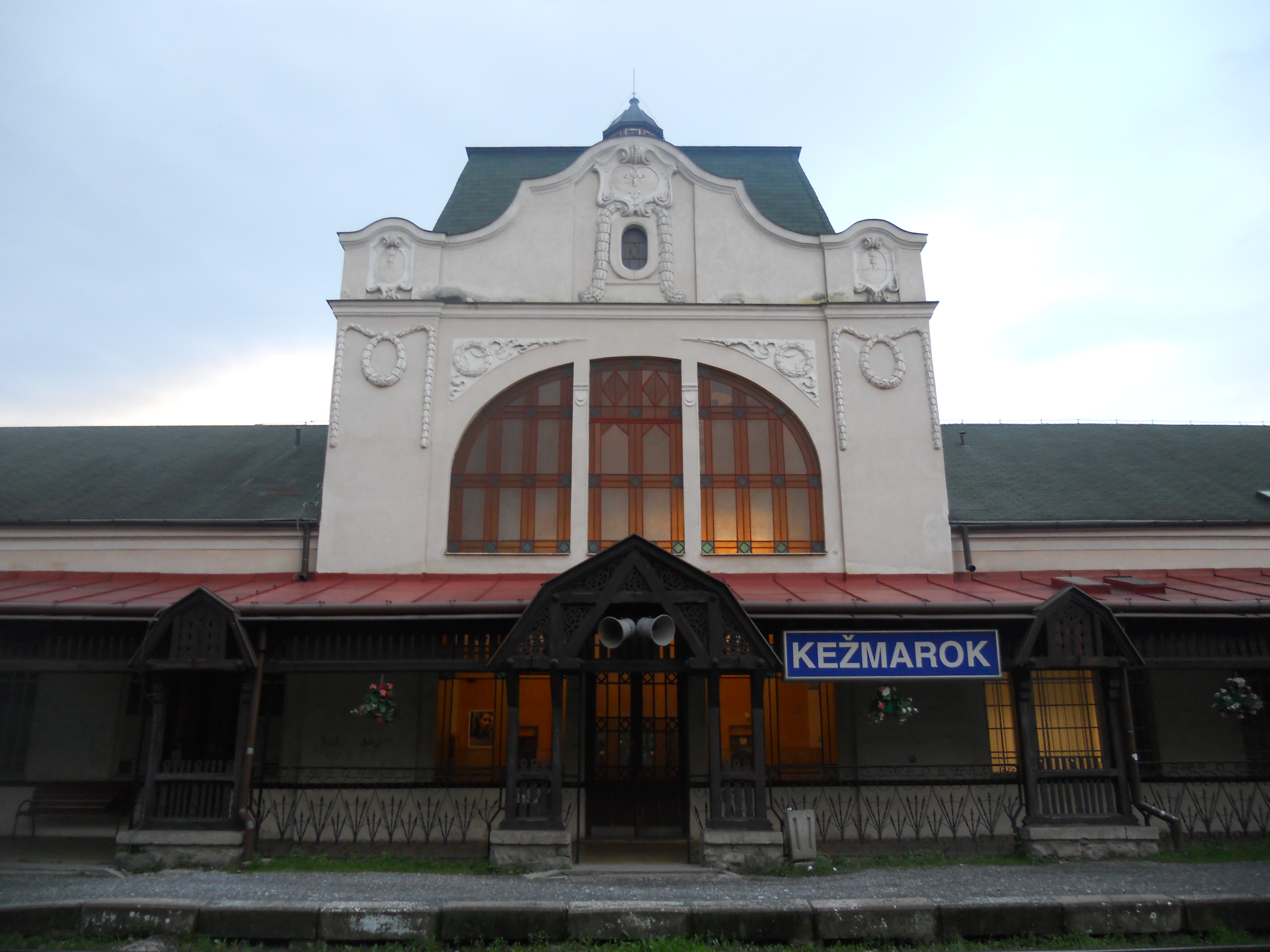
Railway station building

== See also ==
- List of municipalities and towns in Slovakia
