= Vojtech Alexander =

Austro-Hungarian radiologist of Slovak ethnicity

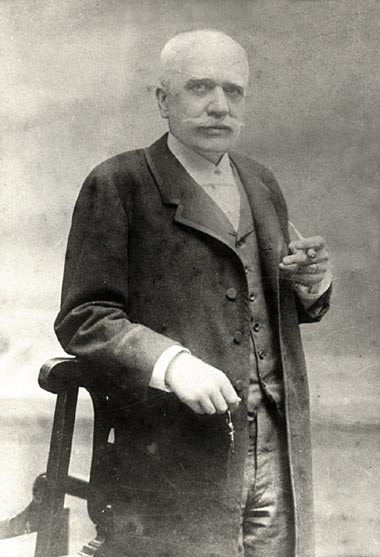
- Born: 31 May 1857; Késmárk, Kingdom of Hungary
- Died: 15 January 1916 (aged 58); Budapest, Austria-Hungary
- Education: University of Budapest
- Known for: radioactivity, tuberculosis
- Scientific career
- Fields: physics, chemistry
- Workplaces: University of Budapest

Vojtech Alexander (Hungarian: Alexander Béla; 31 May 1857 – 15 January 1916) was a Slovak radiologist. He was one of the most influential radiologists in the world.

He was the first university lecturer on radiology in the Kingdom of Hungary. Among his many achievements, he described the development of tuberculosis. He was the owner of the first X-ray apparatus in Slovakia and wrote poems in Slovak.
