= Samuel Genersich =

Carpathian German physician and botanist

Samuel Genersich (February 15, 1768 – September 2, 1844) was a Carpathian German medical doctor and botanist from Kežmarok.

He was the son of Christian Genersich, a merchant in Kežmarok, and his wife Anna Susanna née Royko. He was the younger brother of Johann Genersich, professor at the lyceum in Kežmarok and of Christian Genersich, a Lutheran pastor there.

Genersich studied in Kežmarok and graduated in medicine in Vienna. He practiced medicine for six years in Kežmarok, and was subsequently appointed municipal physician in Levoča. In this capacity he published the Belehrung in 1839.

In botany he published his Elenchus in 1798 and the Catalogus in 1801. A manuscript for a Flora Scepusiaca remains unpublished.

He collaborated with Göran Wahlenberg on his work about the plant taxonomy and geography of the High Tatras. Genersich was also in intensive contact with Pál Kitaibel. Kitaibel's herbarium at the Hungarian National Museum in Budapest contains many plants collected by Genersich.

He was married to Johanna Fabritzy and had six children.

Genersich was an honorary member of the Botanical Society of Regensburg.

Genersich died in Levoča in 1844.

The genus Genersichia (Cyperaceae) was named for him by János Heuffel, as was Dianthus genersichii Gyorffy (Caryophyllaceae).

== Publications ==
- Samuelis Genersich Hungari Késmarkiensis Medicinae Doctoris et Civitatis L. R. Leutschoviensis Physici ordinarii Florae Scepusiensis Elenchus seu Enumeratio plantarum in Comitatu Hungariae Scepusiensi, eumque percurrentibus montibus Carpathicis sponte crescentium. Sumptibus Auctoris. Leutschoviae typis Michaelis Podhorânszki, de eadem 1798.
- Samuelis Genersich Catalogus Plantarum rariorum Scepusii A. 1801 in autumno in usum amicorum conscriptus, a Samuele Genersich Medicinae Doctore, et Civitatis L. R. Leutschoviensis Physico Ord.
- Belehrung für das Publicum der kön. Freistadt Leutschau in Hinsicht der sich geäusserten Rindviehseuche. Leutschau i839
