= Basilica of the Exaltation of the Holy Cross =

Catholic church in eastern Slovakia

Coordinates: 49.1375°N 20.43°E

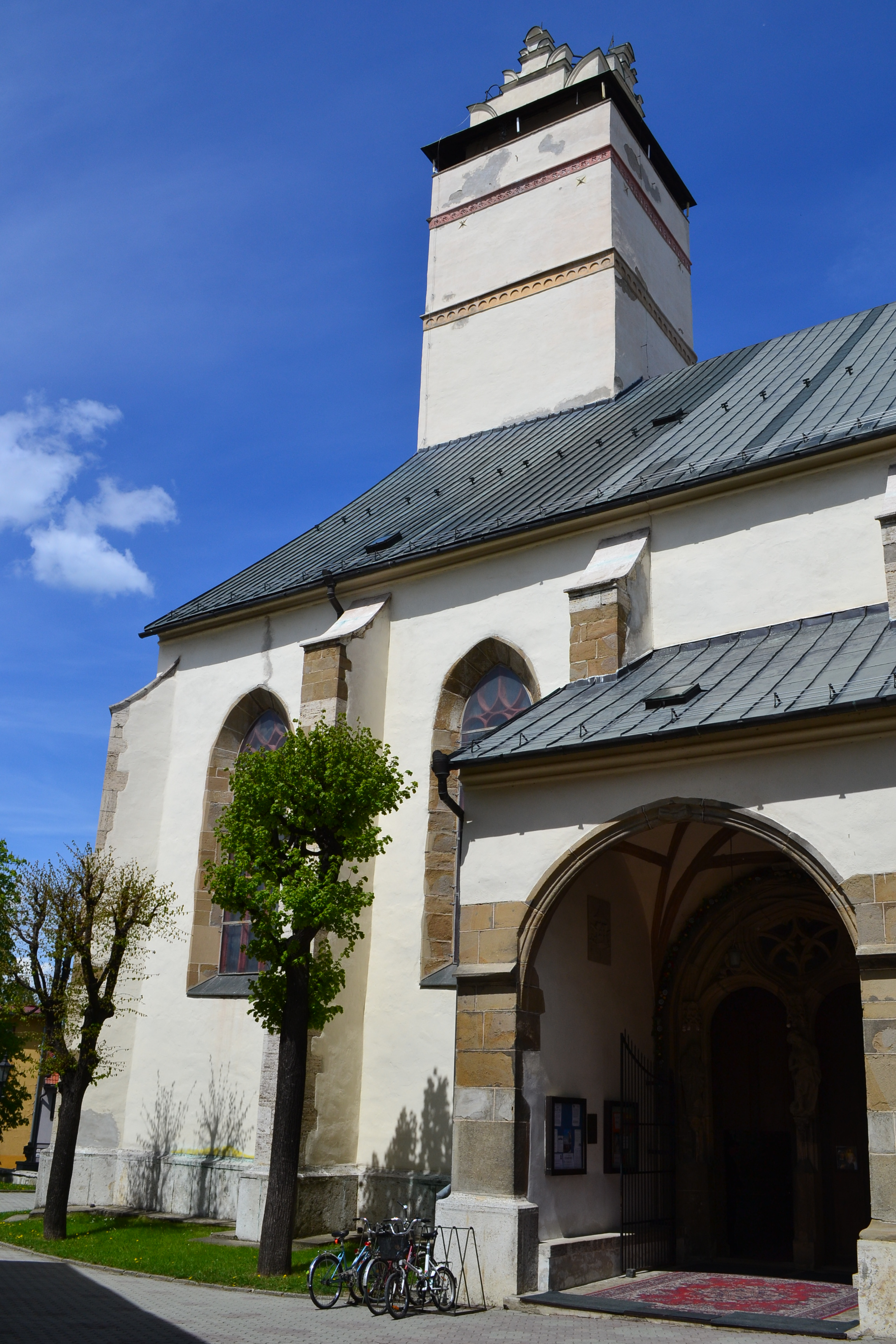
Basilica minor of the Holy Cross - entrance hall and the tower of the basilica

The Basilica minor of the Exaltation of the Holy Cross is a Late Gothic three-nave Catholic church located in the town of Kežmarok in the Spiš region of eastern Slovakia.

== History of the church ==
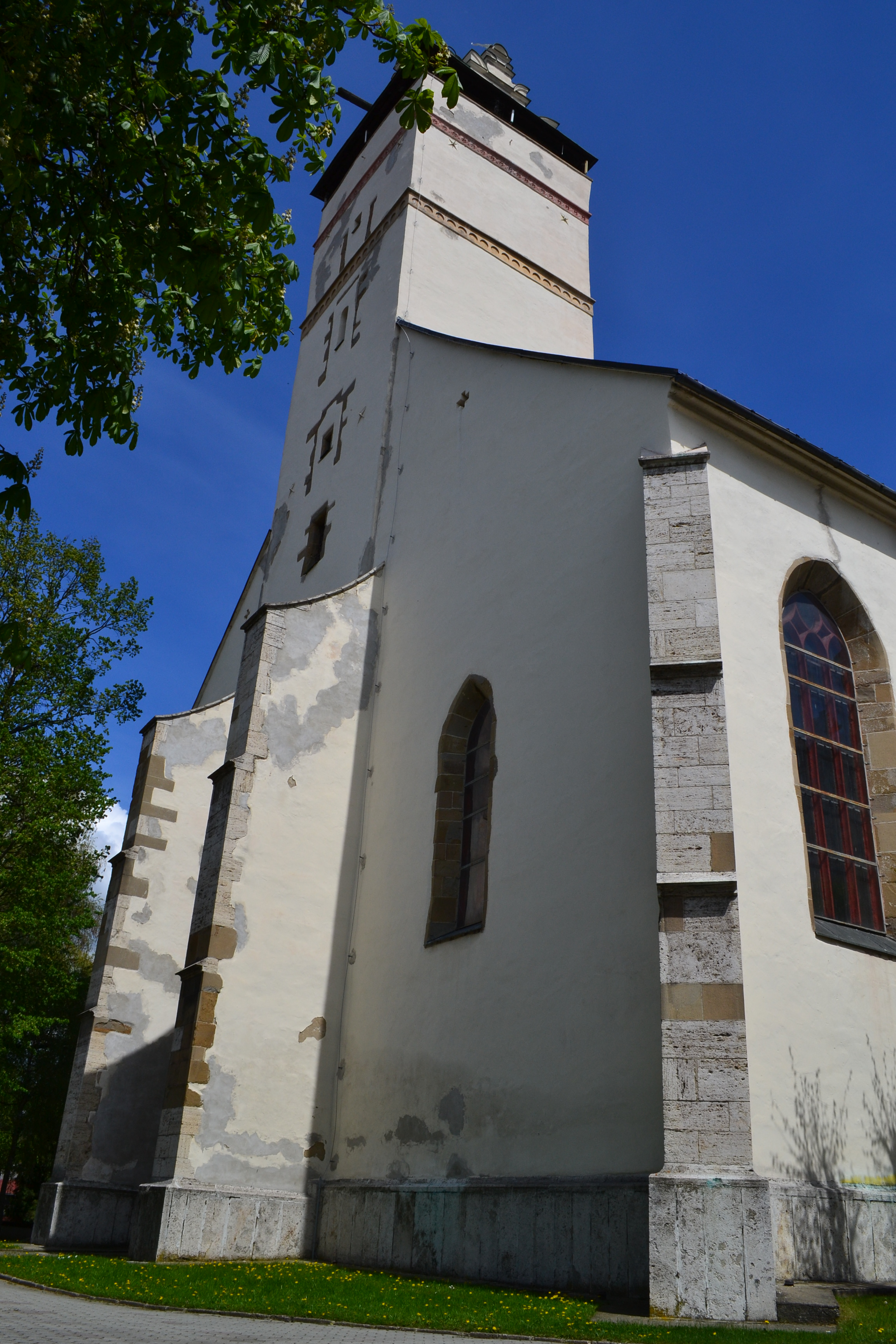
The tower of the basilica

The original parish church was constructed on the site of a previous, probably Romanesque chapel. Development of the city connected with the rapid growth of the population required a new church; the rebuilding began sometime in the first half of the fourteenth century (about 1320). According to modern research this church was 19m wide and about 41m long; the tower on west side and the east end of the sacristy gives us an idea about the size of the church after its first reconstruction. This church was comparable with the largest churches in Upper Hungary. On 25 April 1433 Hussites attacked the city. The following fire and an earthquake in 1443 heavily damaged the church.

=== Fifteenth century ===
The construction of a new Late Gothic church began in 1444. The reconstruction of the church was mainly financed by local noble family of Zápoľský. Some of the outer walls of the original church were preserved during the rebuilding. Reconstruction enlarged the basilica to the south and the east. The reconstruction started with the presbytery and then continued with the nave. The presbytery was mainly finished thanks to contributions from Zapolsky family, as demonstrated by the coats of arms carved above the main portal. The entrance portal was also added to the presbytery in 1486 and the main - south portal of the church was placed in 1498. This year is dated as the completion of Late Gothic reconstruction.

=== Sixteenth and seventeenth century ===
Later, after another fire in 1521, the tower was secured with a stone gallery (in 1525) and after the construction of the new Renaissance bell tower (1589-1591), the tower was adapted to Renaissance style with a new Renaissance attic. Then, the northern hall of the church was built, and the architectonical development of the church was completed.

In the Reformation period the basilica was enriched with a canopy above the pulpit, organ, epitaphs, mortuary and wooden choirs in the side naves (removed after the church was taken over by the Catholics around 1670).

=== Eighteenth and nineteenth century ===
According to the visit of heads of the reformation church from 1709 and the visit from 1731, the church used to have 14 altars. Therefore, Protestants did not remove the altars, they just stopped using them, even though some of them have been damaged by crypto Calvinist chaplains of the Thököly family, which was one of the most important families in Kežmarok. In 1779, the church had only ten altars and in 1803 are described only five altars. Historian Juraj Bohuš wrote about ceiling paintings with images of apostles and church fathers around 1720. The restoration of the exterior of the church occurred in 1731. Subsequently, in 1804 local historian Christian Genersich mentioned stone arches that were painted emerald green, but most of the ceiling paintings were probably whitewashed during the repairs in 1754. Later the tombs of important people such as Catherine Tharcy - wife of the castle administrator Christopher Warkocz, and the castle lord - Hieronym Lasky (1496 – 1541) disappeared.

=== Second half of the nineteenth century and twentieth century ===
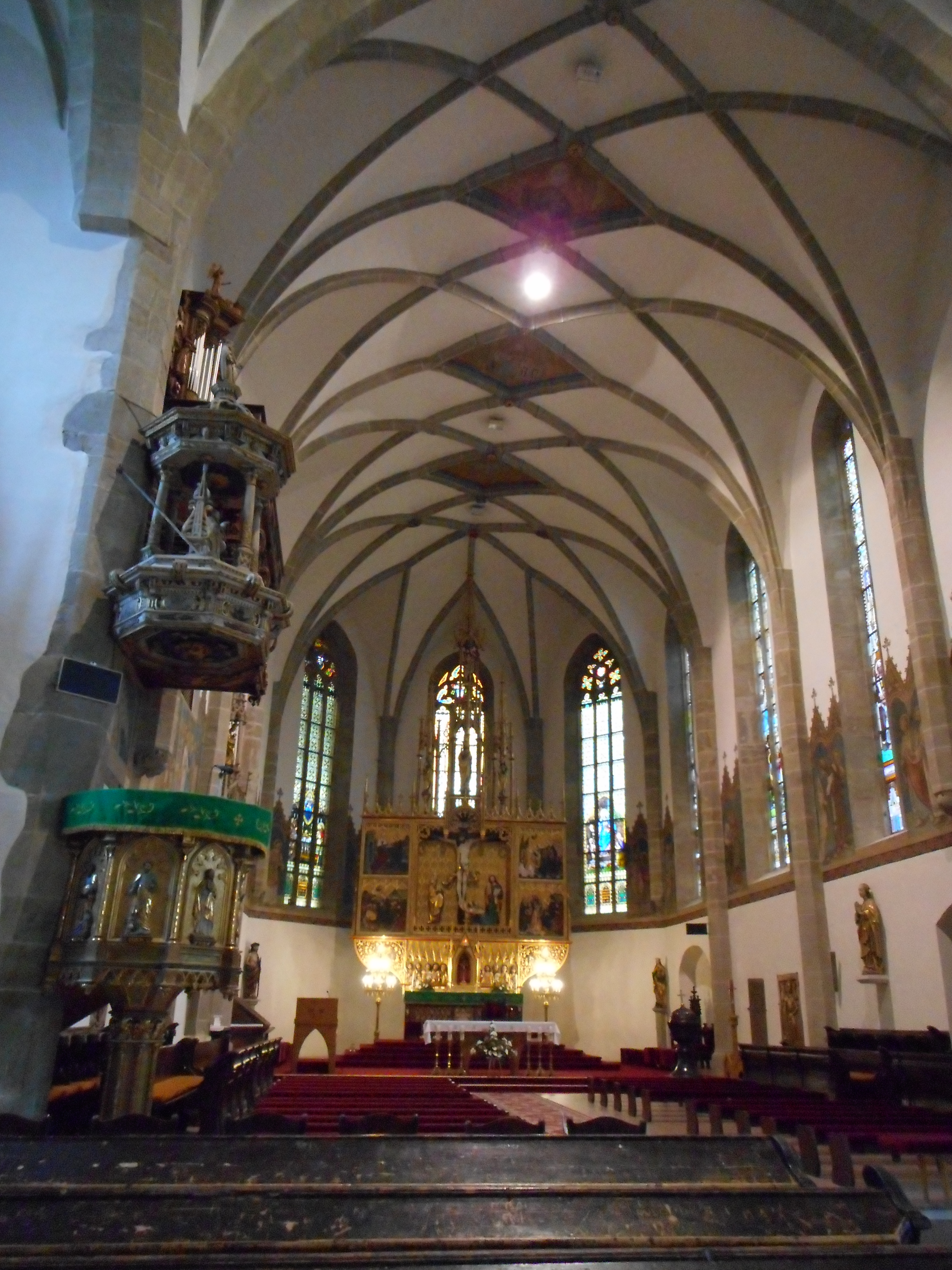
View from the main nave on the presbytery

In the second half of the nineteenth century, the interest in heritage preservation increased. It was based on the romantic tendencies (purism - purity of styles). All Renaissance and Baroque altars were replaced with new Neo-Gothic altars. Using the same principle, those gothic parts of architecture that the renovators considered imperfect were also modified. The renovation of the interior in the Neo-Gothic style started in 1868, so instead of Baroque style altars were built new Neo-Gothic altars, which included parts of preserved original Gothic altars. The Main altar of the Holy Cross was also restored. After removing the original polychromatic paintings both the architectonical and sculptural decoration were newly coated with polychromatic paint. During the renovations several paintings as well as sculptures were painted incorrectly, therefore their historical value is no longer obvious. In 1978 renovations of the church recommenced. The tower and its decorations were restored. Walls of the church were insulated against humidity and the entire surroundings of the church were modified. In years 1993-1994 the church got a new interior paving as well as a floor heating system. The walls were also newly painted. At the same time several sculptures were renovated, for instance the sculpture of archangel Michael. On 14 September 1998 the church was declared by Pope John Paul II as a Basilica Minor.

== Interior ==
The construction of this basilica belongs to the group of Spiš hall churches.

In the presbytery is a Late Gothic net vault of Parler's influence which is based on the principle of intersecting pairs of parallel diagonal ribs, which are established on polygonal massive columnes and are underpinned with brackets. Two brackets keep decoration so called mascarons - faces of a man and a woman. At the intersections of the ribs in the middle of the vault, are placed keystone formed to tiny rosettes or labels with coats of arms. The presbytery itself is illuminated with Late Gothic stained glass windows with rich, original designed traceries.

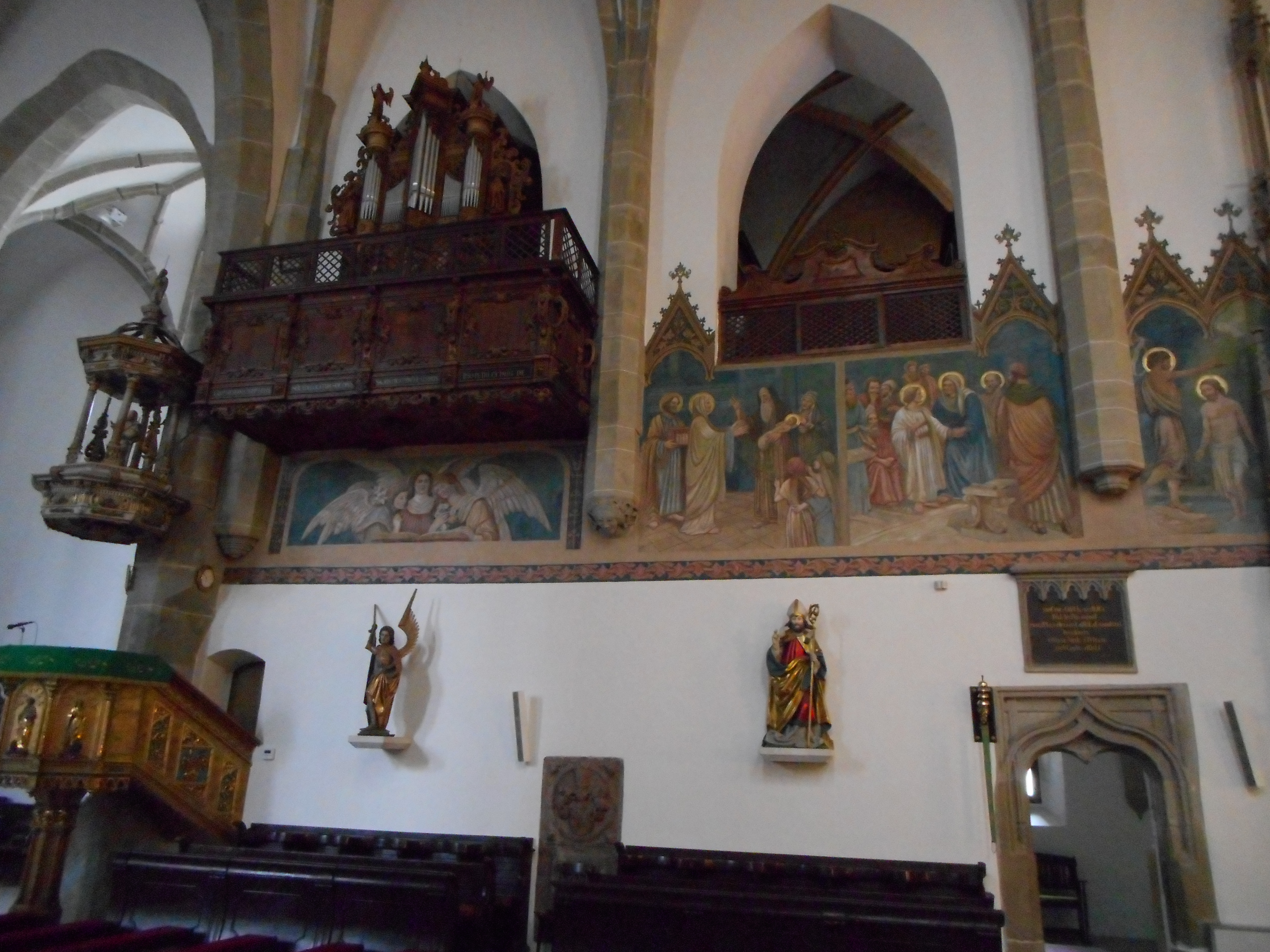
Oratory, choir and the entrance to the sacristy

The Sacristy is dated back to the reconstruction around the year 1320. It has a rectangular floor plant and it is vaulted in three fields of cross ribs vault with wedge ribs that abut the tracery console. In the centre of the ribs are keystones with the motif of ram, moon and sun. Above the sacristy is the oratory which is open towards the presbytery by large pointed arch. The oratory is accessible from the sacristy by an internal staircase. It is vaulted with Gothic net vault whose ribs with grooves are passing smoothly either to the wall, or on rounded supports, or on a label, or on a small console with a plant motifs. There is a rosette window visible inside of the church, which is blinded from outside. The original Late Gothic brick tiles are preserved in the oratory.

Pseudo-basilical inner space consists of three naves that are divided by a tall arcade with pointed arch erected on octagonal columns. In the main central nave is a star-shaped vault whose richly profiled ribs lie on the perimeter walls and pillars without brackets with signs of crossing. In the western part of the central nave is also a choir organ which is under-vaulted with star-vault and finished with stone tracery with a motif of the rotating small flames. In the southern nave is a tracery vault of Parler's scheme, in the north aisle is a simple net vault.

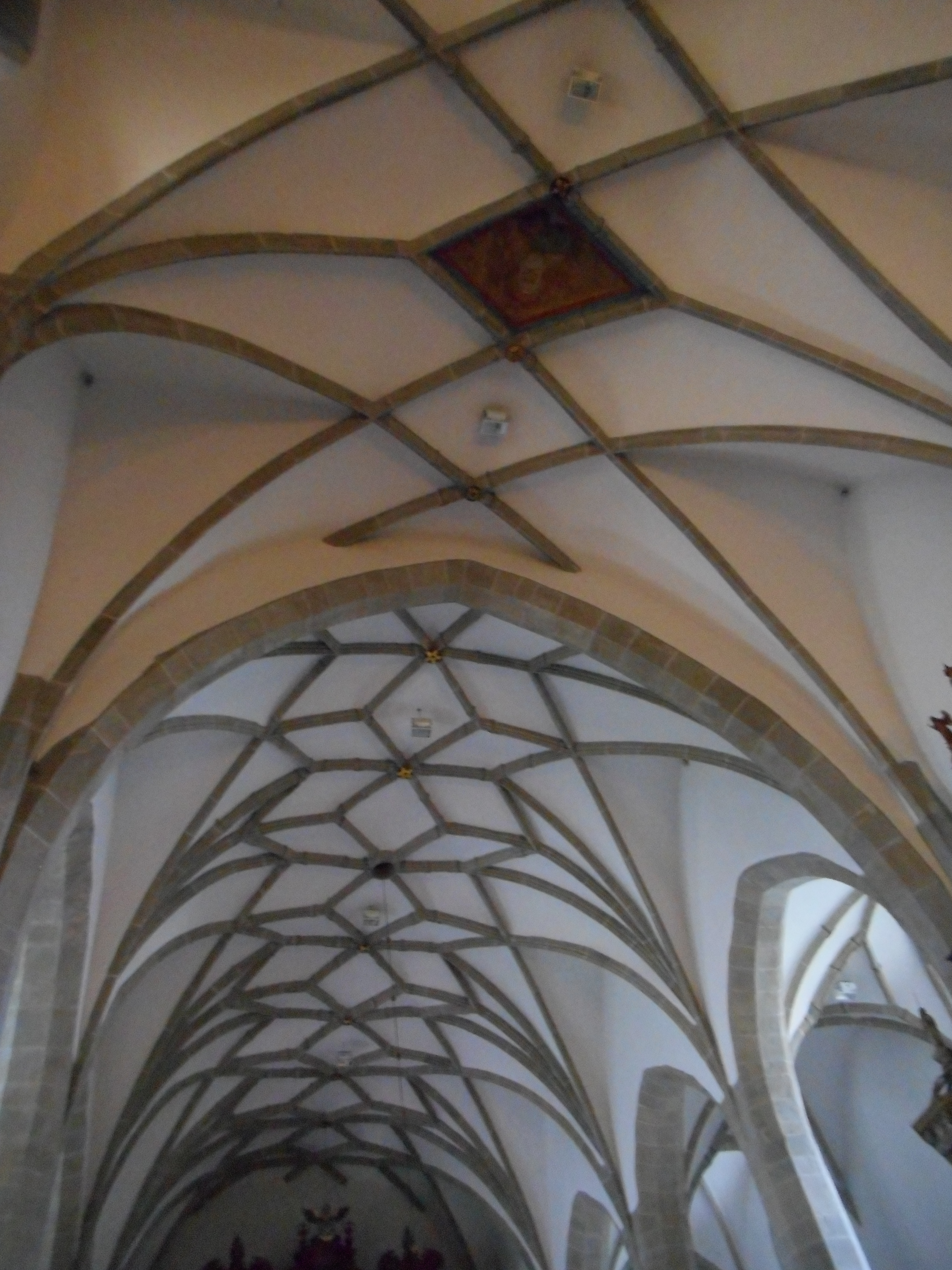
Net vault in the presbytery and star-shaped vault in the main nave

== Exterior ==
In the south wall of the central nave is located a Late Gothic entrance hall which is irregular net-vaulted. Therein it is then mounted a doubleaxies main portal with an irregular rosette window and with statues of Christ, the Virgin Mary and St. John from 1498, together with the commemorative description „crux nos sancta tuere 1498“. The northern side of the church leads to a similar, but simpler portal with the entrance hall from the 16th century.

The tower of the basilica is dated back to the 13th century. In the ground floor are the remains of a portal which originally led to the main nave of the church. Furthermore, there are stone remains of ribs in the corners. In the last floors the Late Gothic walled sound holes have been preserved. The outer facade of the tower is split with two ledges. Along the perimeter of the church are two-stage supporting pillars with a shed roof.

== Altars ==
The decoration of the church used to be much richer but we don't have the exact information about the original state. The walls were decorated with frescoes which were whitewashed during the Reformation. Altars were later dismantled and removed from the church, on the wishes of Thőkőly family who were strongly influenced by court chaplain inclined to the idea of Calvinism. The Catholic church started to manage the church once again and in 1673 the construction of the new altars began. According to records of 1731, there were 14 altars situated in the basilica:

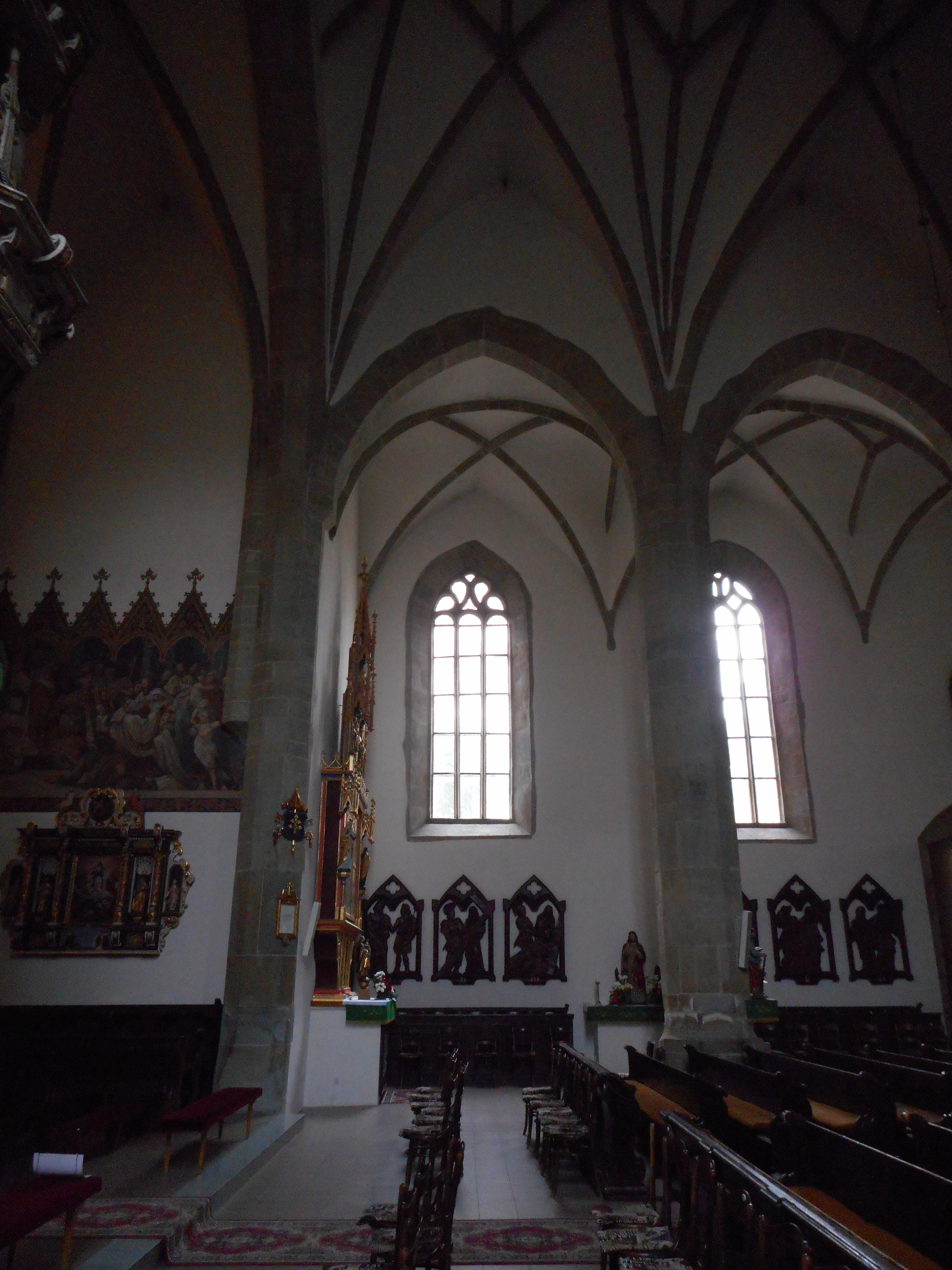
The view from the main nave on the side nave

- main altar of the Holy Cross
- altar of St. Anne
- altar of St. Paul the Hermit (from the workshop of woodcarver Ján Lerch, today placed in the Marian church
- altar of St. Salvatore
- altar of St. Nicholas
- altar of St. Catherine from 1493 (still preserved)
- altar of Jan Nepomucky (the Baroque altar now preserved as an easel painting
- altar of the Holy Trinity (Gothic table painting- removed during the 18th century)
- altar of Martyrs (preserved as altar of St. Apostles)
- altar of St. John the Evangelist (unpreserved)
- altar of St.. Barbara - damaged (the relatively large image of St. Barbara from the first half of the 18th century has been preserved, it was until the restoration in 2005 placed in the Marian church)
- altar of St. Dorothy (damaged)
- the Holly Cross - located in the middle (now located on the main altar)
- altar of the Virgin Mary

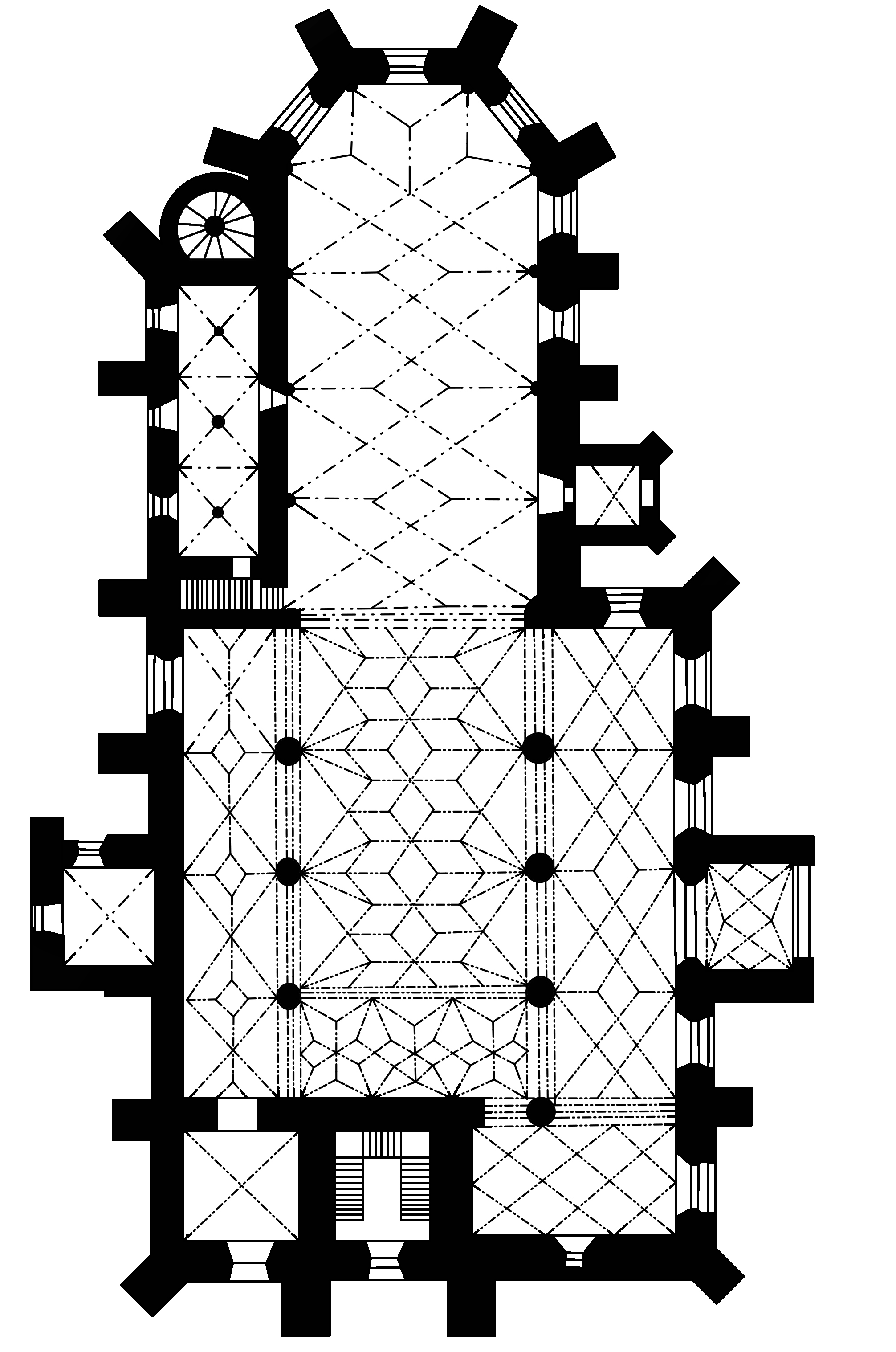
Ground plan

== Sources ==
- Ivan Chalupecký, Bazilika sv. Kríža v Kežmarku, Kežmarok, Rímsko-katolícky farský úrad 2004. 2. oprav. a dopl. vyd. 36 s. Brož. ISBN 80-969175-5-2
- Harminc, Ivan, Súpis pamiatok na Slovensku. Zv. 2., K-P / Slovenský ústav pamiatkovej starostlivosti a ochrany prírody; [spracoval kol. autorov Ivan Harminc ... (et al.); vedecká redaktorka Alžbeta Güntherová; výkonná redaktorka Mária Kosová; recenzovali Ján Mjartan ... (et al.)] Bratislava, 1968. 582 s. sg.: 108G1/
- Rímsko-katolicka cirkev, farnosť Kežmarok: Bazilika minor sv. Kríža. Fara Kežmarok [online]. Kežmarok: Rímsko-katolícka cirkev, 2008 [cit. 2016-06-04]. Dostupné z: https://web.archive.org/web/20170510164732/http://www.fara-kezmarok.sk/sk/frame_kostoly_minor5.html
