= Vladimír Weiss =

Vladimír Weiss may refer to:

- Vladimír Weiss (footballer, born 1939) (1939–2018), former Slovak footballer
- Vladimír Weiss (footballer, born 1964), his son, Slovak football coach
- Vladimír Weiss (footballer, born 1989), his grandson, former Slovak footballer
