= Carpathian Germans =

Group of ethnic Germans in Central and Eastern Europe

Carpathian Germans Karpatendeutsche
- Flag used by Carpathian Germans' Territorial Association

Total population
- 4,690 (2011 census)

Regions with significant populations
- Bratislava, Košice, Spiš, Hauerland

Languages
- Slovak, German, Ukrainian

Religion
- Roman Catholicism 55.5%, Atheism 21.0%, Lutheranism 14.2%, and 9.3 other religions

Related ethnic groups
- Germans; Austrians; Germans of Hungary; Germans of Romania; Germans in the Czech Republic; Germans in Ukraine

Carpathian Germans (German: Karpatendeutsche or Mantaken, Hungarian: kárpátnémetek or felvidéki németek, Slovak: Karpatskí Nemci, Ukrainian: Карпатські німці, Romanian: Germani carpatini) are a group of ethnic Germans in Central and Eastern Europe. The term was coined by the historian Raimund Friederich Kaindl (1866–1930), originally generally referring to the German-speaking population of the area around the Carpathian Mountains: the Cisleithanian (Austrian) crown lands of Galicia and Bukovina, as well as the Hungarian half of the Austro-Hungarian monarchy (including Szepes County), and the northwestern (Maramuresch) region of Romania. Since the First World War, only the Germans of Slovakia (the Slovak Germans or Slowakeideutsche, including the Zipser Germans) and those of Carpathian Ruthenia in Ukraine have commonly been called Carpathian Germans.

== Kingdom of Hungary ==
Germans settled in the northern territory of the medieval Kingdom of Hungary (then called Upper Hungary, today mostly Slovakia) from the 12th to the 15th centuries (see Ostsiedlung), mostly after the 1241 Mongol invasion of Europe. There had probably already been some isolated settlers in the area of Pressburg (Pozsony, today's Bratislava). The Germans were usually attracted by kings seeking specialists in various trades, such as craftsmen and miners. They usually settled in older Slavic market and mining settlements. Until approximately the 15th century, the ruling classes of most cities in present-day Slovakia were almost exclusively composed of Germans.

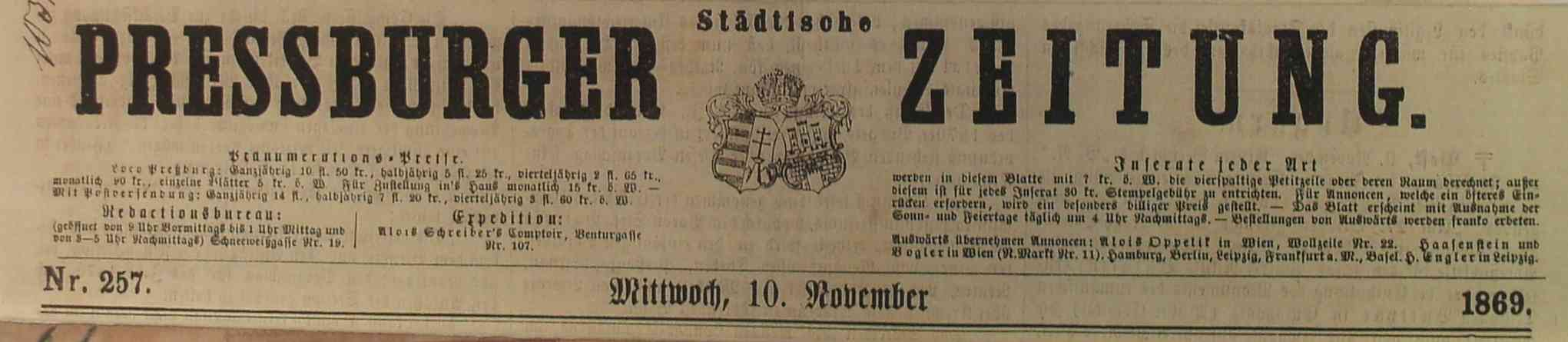
Pressburger Zeitung, 1869

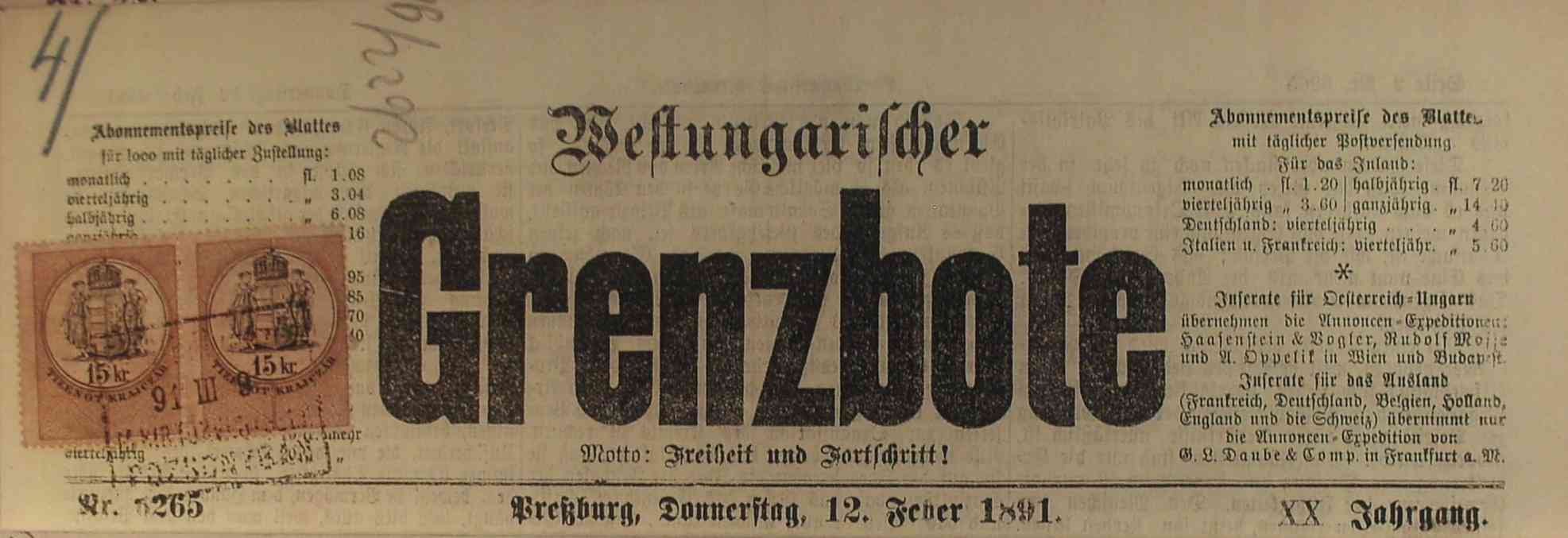
Westungarischer Grenzbote, 1891

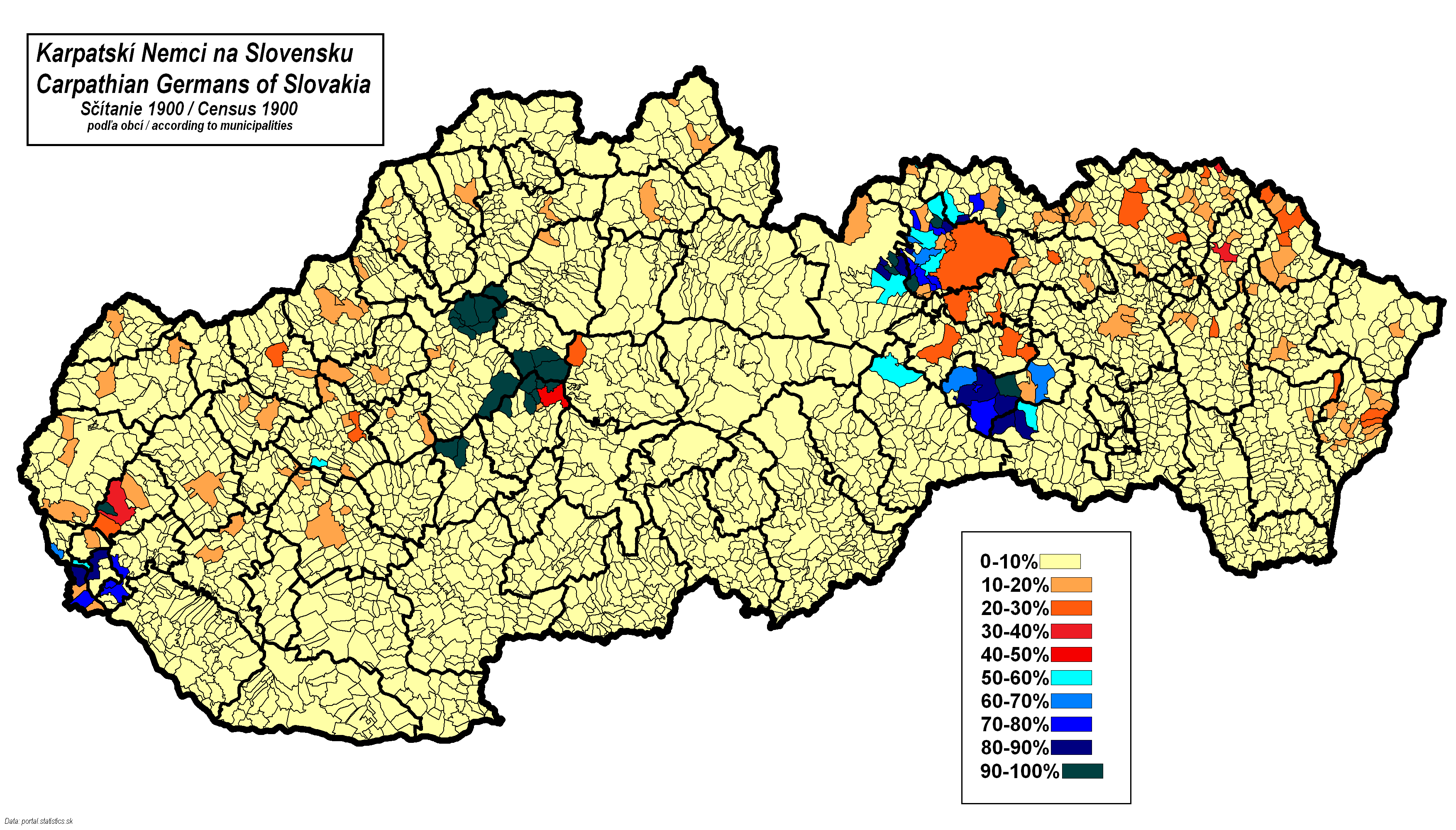
Carpathian Germans in 1900

The main settlement areas were in the vicinity of Pressburg and some language islands in Szepes County (Hungarian: Szepesség; German: Zips; Latin: Scepusium, today Spiš region in Slovakia) and the Hauerland regions. The settlers in the Szepes County were known as Zipser Sachsen (Zipser Saxons, Hungarian: cipszerek). Within Carpathian Ruthenia, they initially settled around Taracköz (German: Theresiental, today Teresva in Ukraine) and Munkács (German: Munkatsch, today Mukachevo in Ukraine).

The Carpathian Germans, like the Slovaks, were subjected to policies of Magyarization in the latter half of the 19th and the early the 20th century. Furthermore, many Carpathian Germans voluntarily magyarized their names to climb the social and economic ladder.

On 28 October 1918, the National Council of Carpathian Germans in Késmárk (German: Käsmark, today Kežmarok, Slovakia) declared their loyalty to the Kingdom of Hungary, but a Slovak group declared it to be part of Czechoslovakia two days later.

== First Czechoslovak Republic ==
During the First Czechoslovak Republic (1918–1938), Carpathian Germans had a specific political party, the Zipser German Party (1920–1938), led by Andor Nitsch, who was elected from 1925 to 1935 on a common Hungarian-German list for parliamentary elections. In 1929, the more nationalist-oriented Carpathian German Party (KdP) was formed in Bratislava, which later made a common list at the 1935 parliamentary elections with the Sudeten German Party; Konrad Henlein became its leader in 1937, with Franz Karmasin as deputy. In 1935, both parties obtained a seat in both parliamentary assemblies. In 1939, the KdP was renamed the German Party, with Franz Karmasin as führer, who had become in October 1938 state secretary for German Affairs in the Slovak Republic (1939–1945), led by Tiso.

The status of the Slovak Republic as a client state of Nazi Germany during World War II made life difficult for Carpathian Germans after the war. Nearly all remaining Germans had fled or were evacuated by the German authorities before the end of the war. Most Germans from Spiš were evacuated to Germany or the Sudetenland before the arrival of the Red Army. The evacuation was mostly the initiative of Adalbert Wanhoff and prepared the diocese of the German Evangelical Church between mid-November 1944 and 21 January 1945. The Germans from Bratislava were evacuated in January and February 1945 after long delays, and those of the Hauerland fled at the end of March 1945. The Red Army reached Bratislava on 4 April 1945.

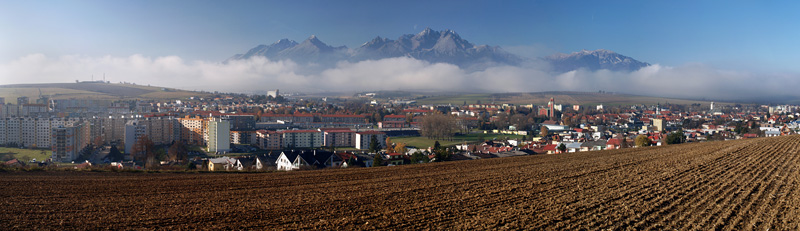
Kežmarok (German: Käsmark) and Levoča (German: Leutschau), the most important urban settlements of the Zipser Germans in the past.

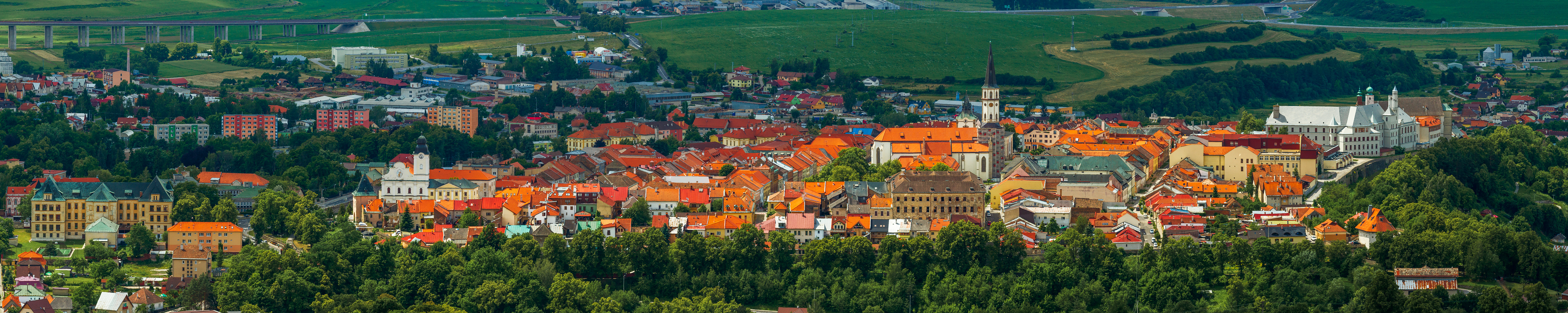
Kežmarok (German: Käsmark) and Levoča (German: Leutschau), the most important urban settlements of the Zipser Germans in the past.

== After World War II ==
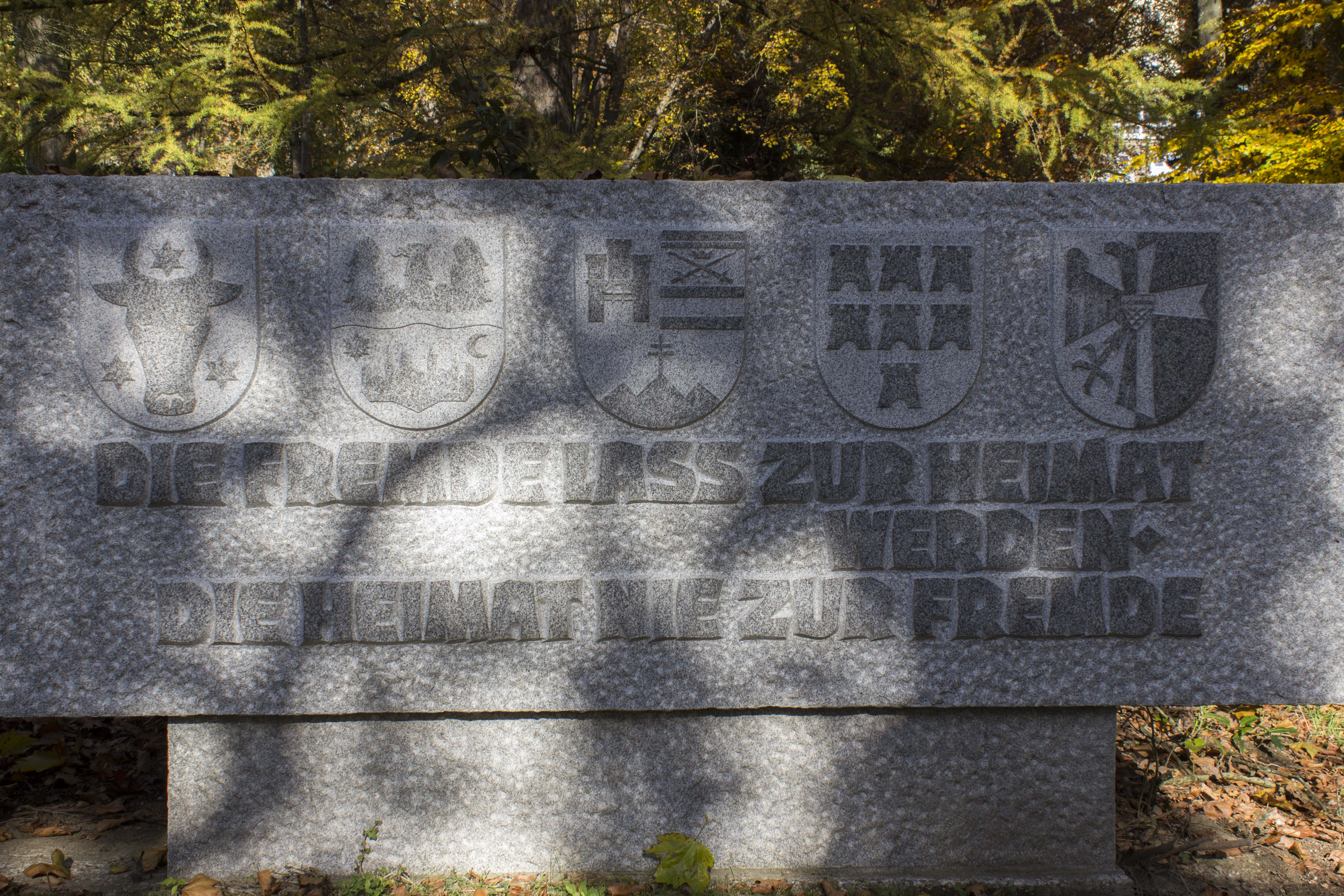
Memorial dedicated to several expelled ethnic German groups from Central and Eastern Europe in Linz, Austria (the third coat-of-arms in the middle being that of the Carpathian Germans).

After the war, one third of the evacuated or fugitive Germans returned to Slovakia. However on 18–19 June 1945, in the Přerov incident in Czechoslovakia, 71 men, 120 women and 74 children (265 Germans) who were Carpathian Germans from Dobšiná were murdered while they were passing through Horní Moštěnice, near Přerov railway station. After being taken out of the train by Czechoslovak soldiers, they were marched outside the city to a hill "Švédské šance", where they were forced to dig their own graves and then were shot. The massacre did not become publicly known until the fall of the communist regime in 1989.

On 2 August 1945, Carpathian Germans lost the rights of citizenship, by Beneš decree no. 33, and they were interned in camps such as in Bratislava-Petržalka, Nováky, and in Krickerhau Handlová. In 1946 and 1947, about 33,000 people were expelled from Slovakia under the Potsdam Agreement, and around 20,000 persons were allowed or forced to remain in Slovakia because they were able, on petition, to use the "Slovakisation" process, which meant that they declared themselves as Slovaks and either changed their names to Slovak equivalents or simply Slovakized them, and others were simply forced to remain because their skills were needed. Out of approximately 128,000 Germans in Slovakia in 1938, only some 20,000 (15.6% of the prewar total) remained by 1947. The citizenship rules of the Beneš decrees were revoked in 1948 but not the expropriations.

== Today ==
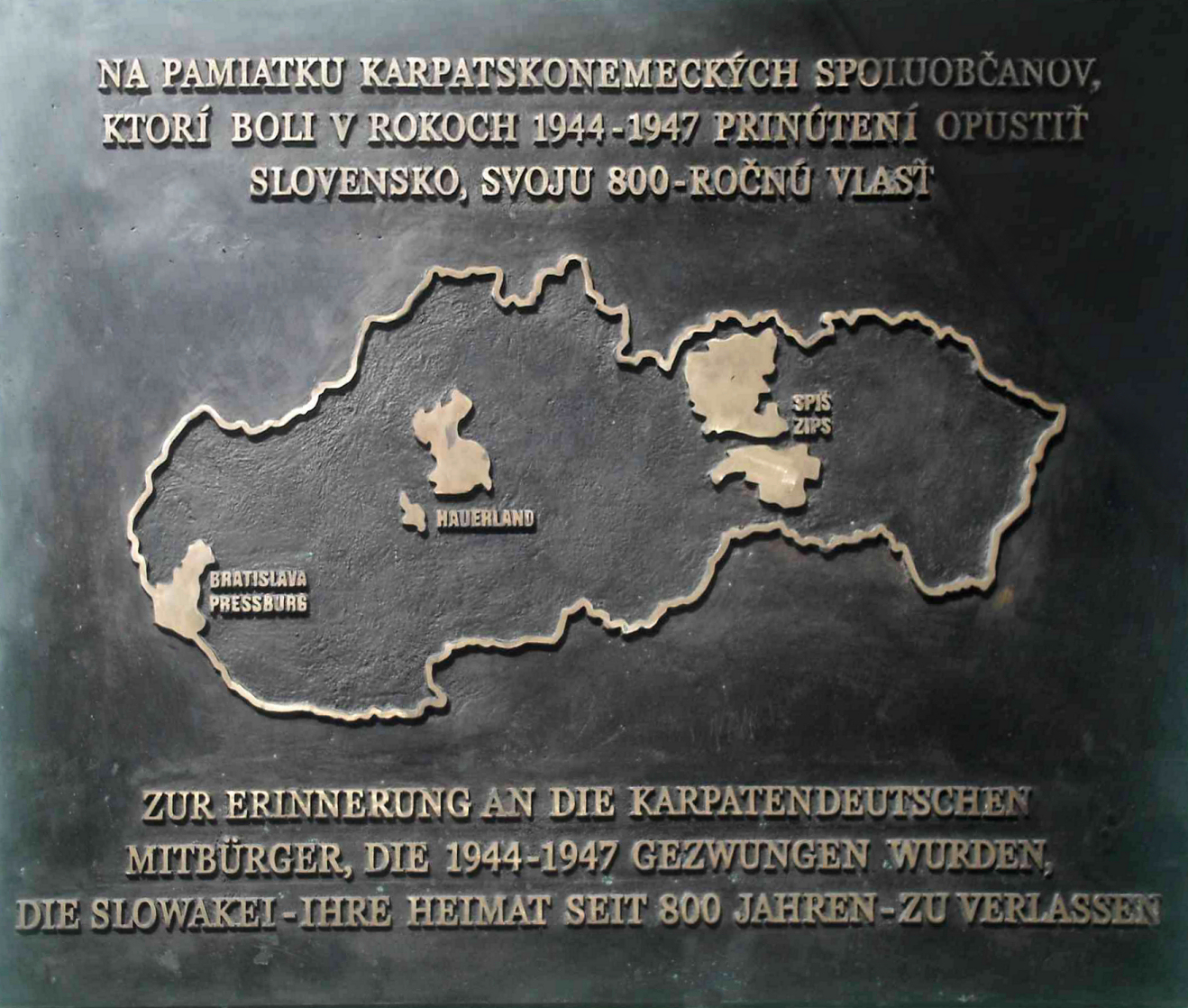
Memorial plaque commemorating expelled Carpathian Germans, Bratislava

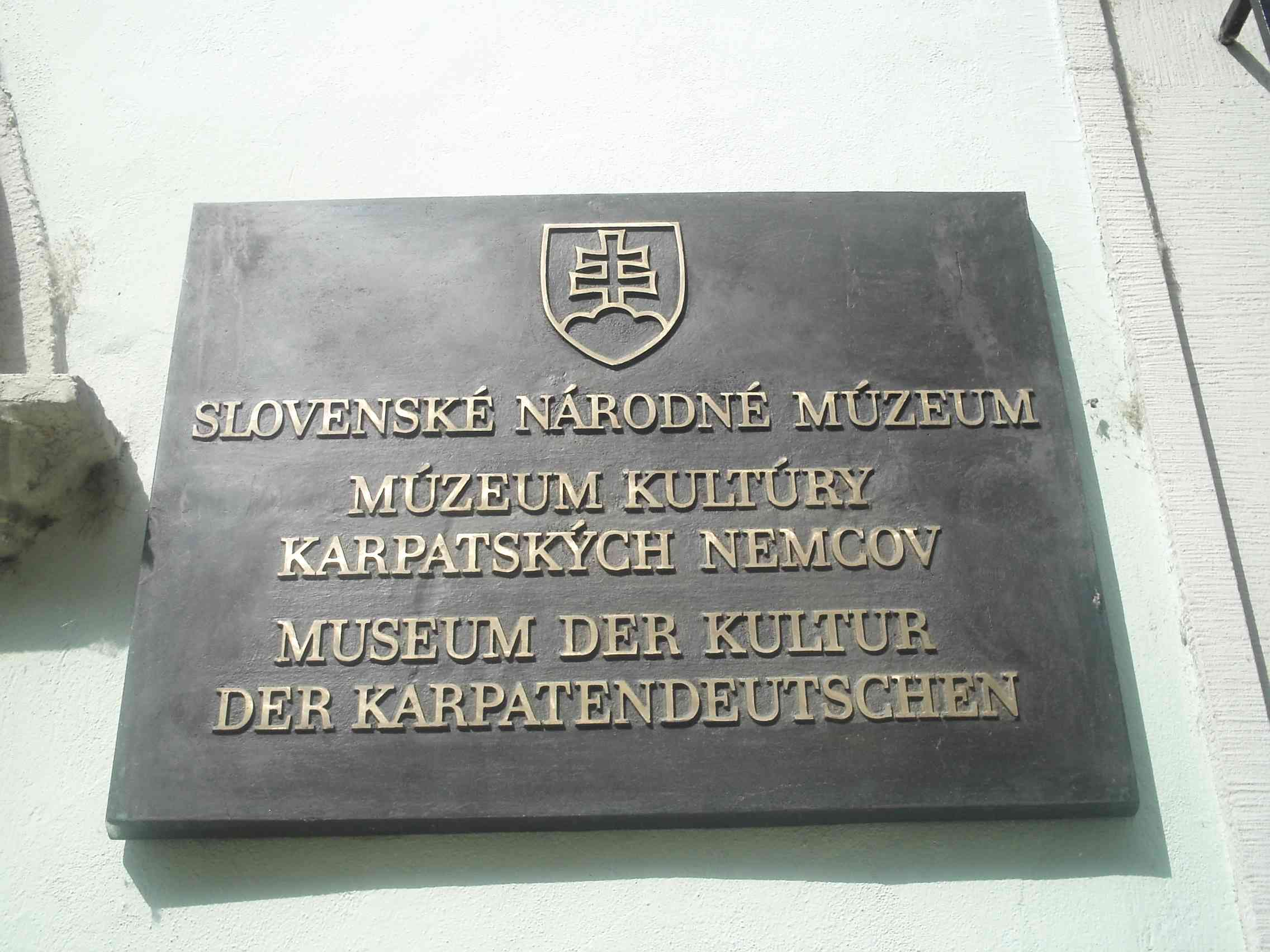
Plate in the Slovak Museum of German Culture in Bratislava

According to national censuses, there were 6,108 (0.11%) Germans in Slovakia in 2007, 5,405 in 2001, 5,414 in 1991 and 2,918 in 1980. A Carpathian German Homeland Association has been created to maintain traditions, and since 2005, there is also a museum of culture of Carpathian Germans in Bratislava. There are two German-language media that are assisted financially by the Slovak government: Karpatenblatt (monthly) and IKEJA news (Internet). There is also minority broadcasting in German on the Slovak radio. After the war, their countrymen, now living in Germany and Austria, founded cultural associations as well. There is also a Carpathian German Landsmannschaft of North America.

Amongst prominent member ethnic Germans in postwar Slovakia is Rudolf Schuster, the country's second president (1999–2004). Others e.g.

- Vladimír Weiss, a name shared by three generations of Slovak footballers
- Peter Sagan, Slovak international champion of bicycle race,
- Branislav Gröhling, Slovak minister of education
- Karol Šmidke, president of the Presidium of the Slovak National Council

=== Language ===
2011 Slovak census data for number of German speakers in the Lower Zips/Dolný Spiš geographic region.

The isolation of the German from countries in which German has been standardised (Germany, Austria, and to some extent, Switzerland) has caused many obscure German dialects to continue to exist in Slovakia, but many are in danger of extinction.

In the Upper and Lower Zips regions (and later in Romania), the Zipser Germans spoke Zipserisch. A community of speakers remains in Hopgarten and speaks a distinctive dialect, Outzäpsersch (German: Altzipserisch, literally "Old Zipserish"). In Dobsina, they spoke what they called Dobschauisch or Topschauisch. In Metzenseifen (Medzev), they spoke Mantak, but only a few dozen people speak it today. The German schools were closed after World War II in all former German-speaking towns, and children were forced to learn Slovak. German was not to be used in the workplace or even publicly on the street.

== Historical demographics ==
The German minority in Slovakia has more or less always constantly been decreasing since the late 19th century onwards, according to the official Slovak national censuses. After 1947, their numbers gradually shrank even more in the wake of the expulsion of ethnic Germans from Czechoslovakia after World War II.

Historical population
Year	Pop.	±%
1880	228,799	—
1910	198,385	−13.3%
1921	139,900	−29.5%
1930	148,214	+5.9%
1938	128,000	−13.6%
1947	24,000	−81.2%
1961	6,266	−73.9%
1980	4,093	−34.7%
1991	5,414	+32.3%
2001	5,405	−0.2%
2011	4,690	−13.2%
Sources: Slovak national censuses and Encyklopédia Slovenska

== Outside Slovakia ==
The Carpathian and other German groups in Romania are currently represented by the Democratic Forum of Germans in Romania (DFDR/FDGR). Carpathian/Zipser Germans are mostly to be found in Maramuresch (across the Rodna Mountains and within Maramureș County more specifically), Bukovina, and elsewhere sparsely throughout Transylvania. In general, in Maramureș, the Zipsers were colonised in mining areas.

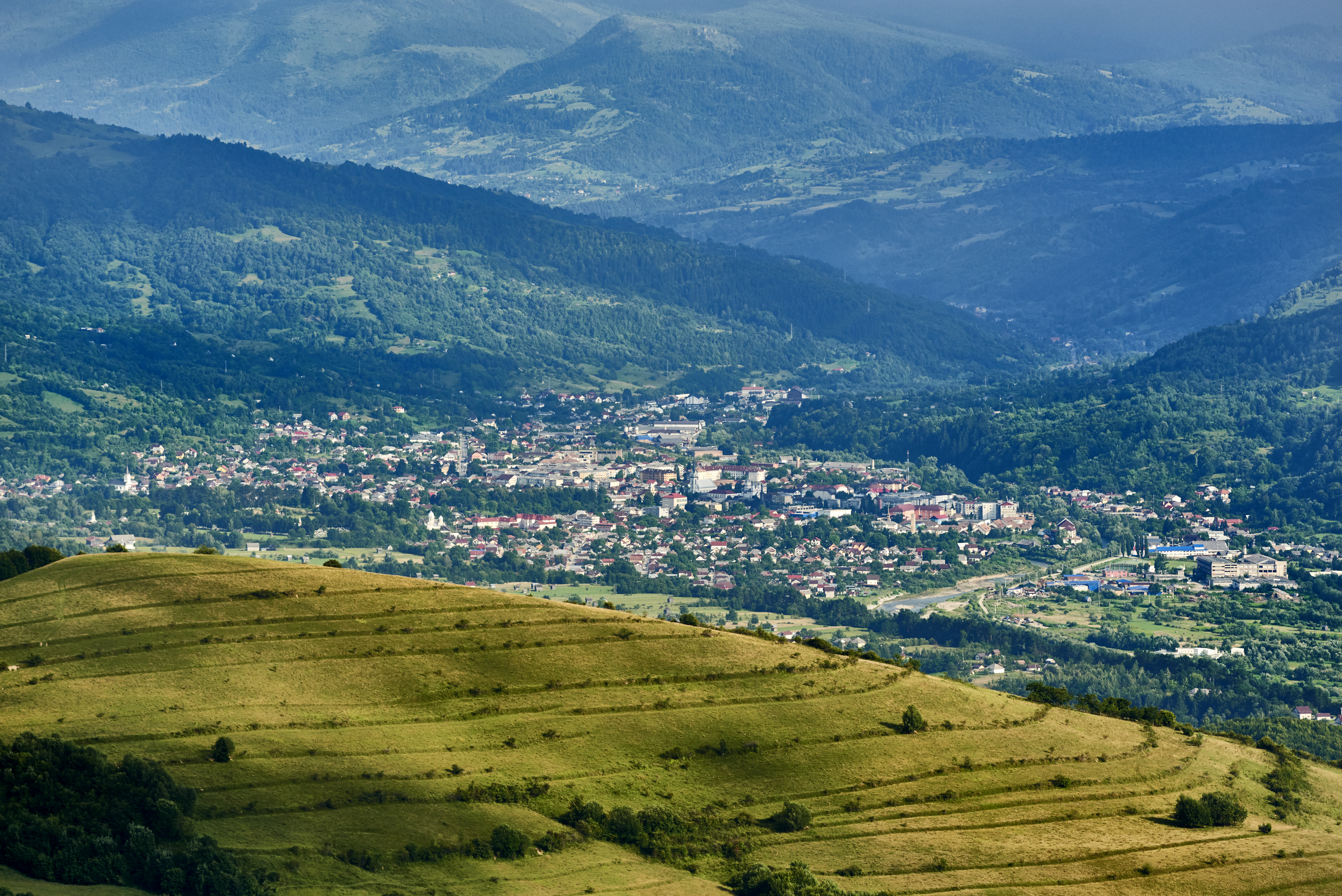
Vișeu de Sus (German: Oberwischau), Maramureș, Romania

The same applies for Bukovina, where Zipsers were also miners and lumberjacks. For example, in southern Bukovina (i.e. present-day Suceava County in northeastern Romania), several former Zipser German rural settlements include Iacobeni (German: Jakobeny), Cârlibaba (German: Mariensee/Ludwigsdorf), and Fundu Moldovei (German: Louisenthal).

The Carpathian/Zipser Germans' settlements are located towards the Carpathian Mountains, westward in Bukovina and Suceava County. There were mostly mining communities. Today, sparse German communities still live in Bukovina/Suceava County, both Zipsers and Bukovina Germans, but their numbers are drastically dwindling.

In Maramureș, Vișeu de Sus (German: Oberwischau) is still home to a small community of Zipser Germans (according to the 2011 Romanian census) who are also politically represented in the town's council by one councillor stemming from the Democratic Forum of Germans in Romania (DFDR/FDGR).

== See also ==
- Zipser Willkür
- Pavshyno (Pausching)
- Gottscheers
- Sudeten Germans
- Oberlander Jews
- Upper Hungary
- Volksdeutsche
- Walddeutsche
