= Matovič's Cabinet =

Cabinet of Igor Matovič
- 11th Cabinet of Slovakia

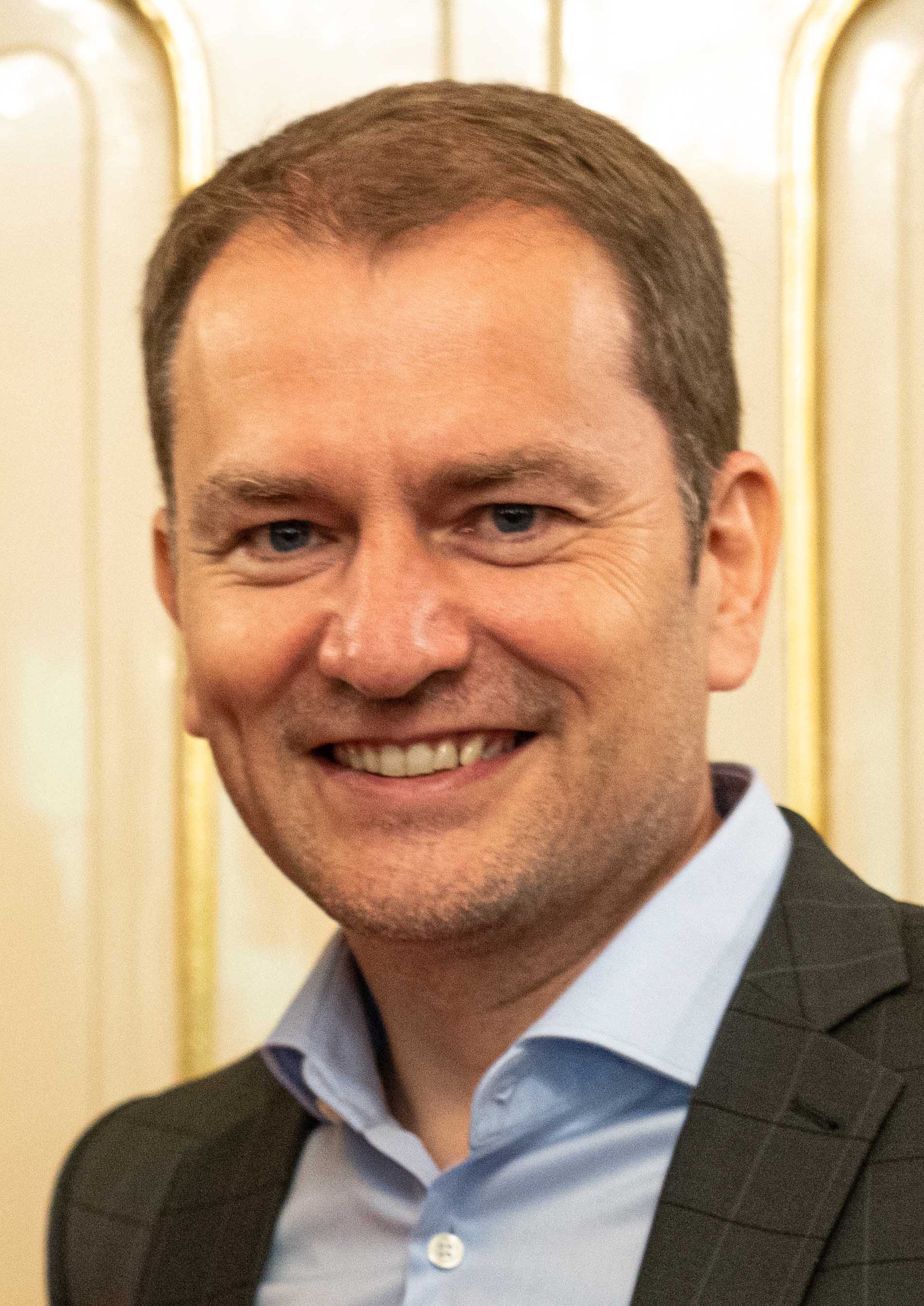
- Date formed: 21 March 2020
- Date dissolved: 1 April 2021

People and organisations
- President of Slovakia: Zuzana Čaputová
- Prime Minister: Igor Matovič
- Deputy Prime Ministers: Eduard Heger; Štefan Holý; Richard Sulík; Veronika Remišová
- No. of ministers: 16
- Total no. of members: 16
- Member parties: Ordinary People and Independent Personalities; We Are Family; Freedom and Solidarity; For the People; Christian Union (Note: Ran on the party ticket of Ordinary People and Independent Personalities.); New Majority; Civic Conservative Party (Note: Ran on the party ticket of Freedom and Solidarity.); Change from Below
- Status in legislature: Supermajority (coalition) (2020–March 2021); Majority (coalition) (March 2021)
- Opposition parties: Direction – Social Democracy; Kotlebists – People's Party Our Slovakia; Voice – Social Democracy (Note: Ran on the party ticket of Direction – Social Democracy. Left the parliamentary group on 11 September 2020 and were sitting as independents in the National Council.); Life – National Party (Note: Ran on the party ticket of Kotlebists – People's Party Our Slovakia. Left the parliamentary group on 27 May 2020 and were sitting as independents in the National Council.)
- Opposition leader: Peter Pellegrini; Robert Fico

History
- Election: 2020 Slovak parliamentary election
- Predecessor: Pellegrini's Cabinet
- Successor: Heger's Cabinet

The Cabinet of Igor Matovič was a Government of the Slovak Republic led by Prime Minister Igor Matovič. It was formed on 21 March 2020, following the 2020 parliamentary election as a coalition of four parties – Ordinary People and Independent Personalities, (Note: Ordinary People and Independent Personalities (OĽANO), NOVA, Christian Union (KÚ), Change from the Bottom) We Are Family, Freedom and Solidarity and For the People.

It was approved by the National Council on 30 April 2020 with a 93–48 vote.

The coalition crisis in March 2021 led to resignation of Igor Matovič and his government on 30 March 2021. Matovič's Cabinet was replaced on 1 April 2021 by the Cabinet of Eduard Heger, who was the Minister of Finance in Matovič's Cabinet.

== Composition ==
| Portfolio | Minister | Took office | Left office | Party |
Government's Office
| Prime Minister | Igor Matovič | 21 March 2020 | 1 April 2021 | Ordinary People and Independent Personalities |
Ministry of Finance
| Deputy Prime Minister and Minister of Finance | Eduard Heger | 21 March 2020 | 1 April 2021 | Ordinary People and Independent Personalities |
Deputy Prime Minister
| Deputy Prime Minister for Legislation and Strategic Planning | Štefan Holý | 21 March 2020 | 1 April 2021 | We Are Family |
Ministry of Economy
| Deputy Prime Minister and Minister of Economy | Richard Sulík | 21 March 2020 | 23 March 2021 | Freedom and Solidarity |
| Deputy Prime Minister and Minister of Economy | Andrej Doležal (Note: Independent, nominated by We Are Family.) (Note: Acting minister.) (Note: Did not serve as deputy prime minister.) | 23 March 2021 | 1 April 2021 | We Are Family |
Ministry of Investment, Regional Development and Informatics
| Deputy Prime Minister and Minister of Investments, Regional Development and Informatization | Veronika Remišová | 21 March 2020 | 1 April 2021 | For the People |
Ministry of Transport and Construction
| Minister of Transport and Construction | Andrej Doležal | 21 March 2020 | 1 April 2021 | We Are Family |
Ministry of Culture
| Minister of Culture | Natália Milanová | 21 March 2020 | 1 April 2021 | Ordinary People and Independent Personalities |
Ministry of Defence
| Minister of Defence | Jaroslav Naď | 21 March 2020 | 1 April 2021 | Ordinary People and Independent Personalities |
Ministry of Agriculture and Rural Development
| Minister of Agriculture and Rural Development | Ján Mičovský | 21 March 2020 | 1 April 2021 | Ordinary People and Independent Personalities |
Ministry of Labour, Social Affairs and Family
| Minister of Labour, Social Affairs and Family | Milan Krajniak | 21 March 2020 | 17 March 2021 | We Are Family |
| Minister of Labour, Social Affairs and Family | Andrej Doležal | 17 March 2021 | 1 April 2021 | We Are Family |
Ministry of Health
| Minister of Health | Marek Krajčí | 21 March 2020 | 12 March 2021 | Ordinary People and Independent Personalities |
| Minister of Health | Eduard Heger | 12 March 2021 | 1 April 2021 | Ordinary People and Independent Personalities |
Ministry of Justice
| Minister of Justice | Mária Kolíková | 21 March 2020 | 23 March 2021 | For the People |
| Minister of Justice | Veronika Remišová | 23 March 2021 | 1 April 2021 | For the People |
Ministry of Education, Science, Research and Sport
| Minister of Education, Science, Research and Sport | Branislav Gröhling | 21 March 2020 | 25 March 2021 | Freedom and Solidarity |
| Minister of Education, Science, Research and Sport | Eduard Heger | 25 March 2021 | 1 April 2021 | Ordinary People and Independent Personalities |
Ministry of Foreign and European Affairs
| Minister of Foreign and European Affairs | Richard Sulík | 21 March 2020 | 8 April 2020 | Freedom and Solidarity |
| Minister of Foreign and European Affairs | Ivan Korčok (Note: Independent, nominated by Freedom and Solidarity.) | 8 April 2020 | 25 March 2021 | Freedom and Solidarity |
| Minister of Foreign and European Affairs | Jaroslav Naď | 25 March 2021 | 1 April 2021 | Ordinary People and Independent Personalities |
Ministry of the Environment
| Minister of Environment | Ján Budaj | 21 March 2020 | 1 April 2021 | Ordinary People and Independent Personalities |
Ministry of Interior
| Minister of Interior | Roman Mikulec | 21 March 2020 | 1 April 2021 | Ordinary People and Independent Personalities |

== Party composition ==
From the election until 25 March 2021 the following parties formed the government:

| Party | Ideology | Leader | Deputies | Ministers |
|---|---|---|---|---|
| OĽaNO | Anti-corruption populism | Igor Matovič | 53 / 150 | 8 / 16 |
| SR | National conservatism | Boris Kollár | 17 / 150 | 3 / 16 |
| SaS | Liberalism | Richard Sulík | 13 / 150 | 3 / 16 |
| ZĽ | Liberal conservatism | Andrej Kiska | 12 / 150 | 2 / 16 |
| Total | | | 95 / 150 | 16 |

After the SaS left the government due vaccines Sputnik V the governing parties were the following:

| Party | Ideology | Leader | Deputies | Ministers |
|---|---|---|---|---|
| OĽaNO | Anti-corruption populism | Igor Matovič | 53 / 150 | 7 / 16 |
| SR | National conservatism | Boris Kollár | 17 / 150 | 2 / 16 |
| ZĽ | Liberal conservatism | Veronika Remišová | 10 / 150 | 1 / 16 |
| Total | | | 80 / 150 | 10 |
