= Cabinet of Eduard Heger =

12th government of Slovakia

- 12th Cabinet of Slovakia

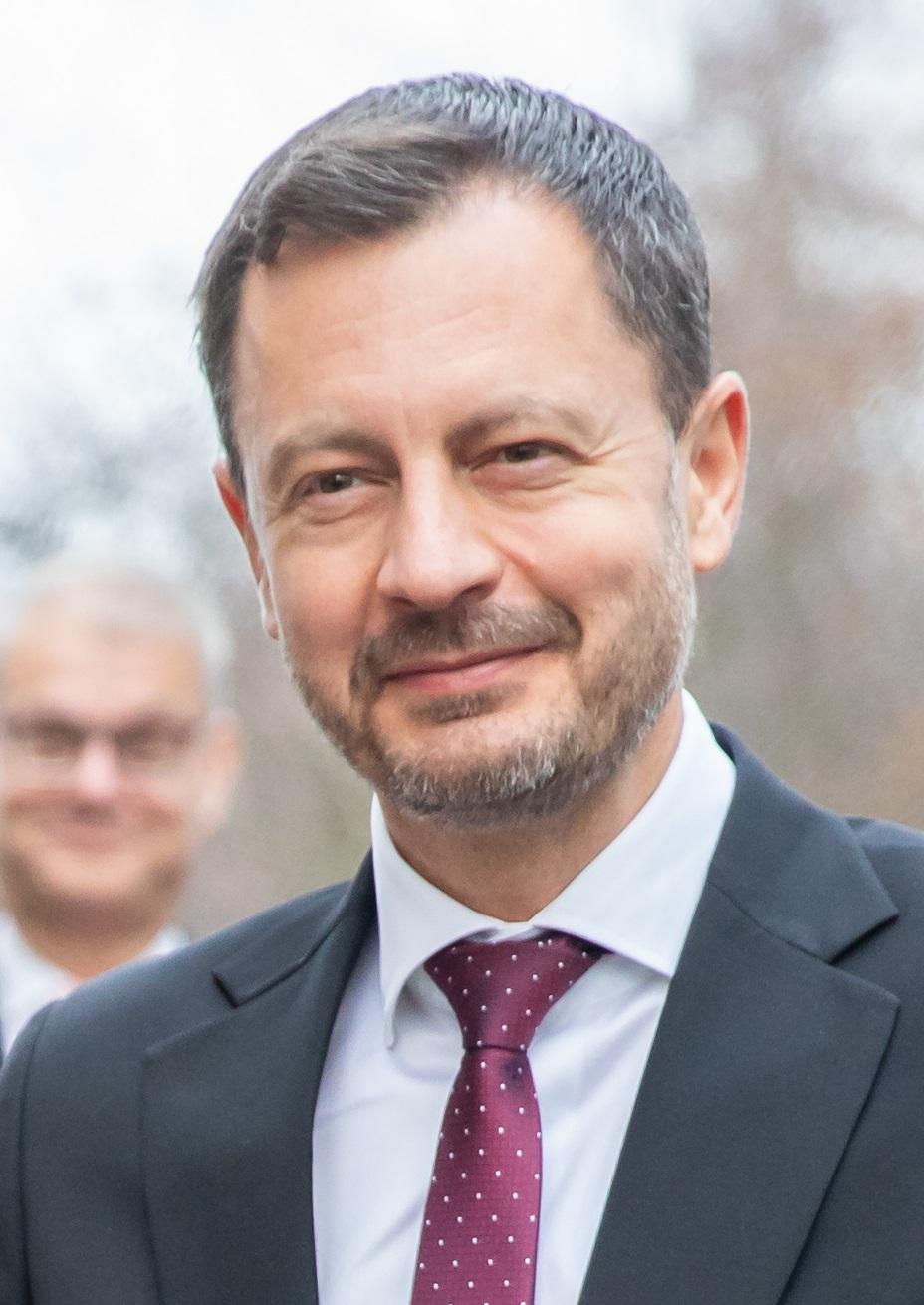
- Date formed: 1 April 2021
- Date dissolved: 15 May 2023

People and organisations
- President of Slovakia: Zuzana Čaputová
- Prime Minister: Eduard Heger
- Deputy Prime Ministers: Igor Matovič (2021–2022); Štefan Holý; Richard Sulík (2021–2022); Veronika Remišová
- No. of ministers: 16
- Total no. of members: 21
- Member parties: Ordinary People and Independent Personalities; Freedom and Solidarity (2021–2022); We Are Family; Democrats (Note: Ran on the party ticket of Ordinary People and Independent Personalities. Left the party on 7 March 2023.) (2023); Christian Union (Note: Ran on the party ticket of Ordinary People and Independent Personalities.); New Majority; Civic Conservative Party (Note: Ran on the party ticket of Freedom and Solidarity.) (2021–2022); Change from Below; For the People
- Status in legislature: Supermajority (2021–2022); Minority (2022); Caretakers (2022–2023)
- Opposition parties: Direction – Social Democracy; Freedom and Solidarity (2022–2023); Kotlebists – People's Party Our Slovakia; Voice – Social Democracy (Note: Ran on the party ticket of Direction – Social Democracy. Left the parliamentary group on 11 September 2020 and were sitting as independents in the National Council.); Life – National Party (Note: Ran on the party ticket of Kotlebists – People's Party Our Slovakia. Left the parliamentary group on 27 May 2020 and were sitting as independents in the National Council.); Civic Conservative Party (Note: Ran on the party ticket of Freedom and Solidarity.) (2022–2023)
- Opposition leader: Robert Fico

History
- Election: 2020 Slovak parliamentary election
- Predecessor: Matovič's Cabinet
- Successor: Ódor's Cabinet

The Cabinet of Eduard Heger was the 12th government of Slovakia, led by Prime Minister Eduard Heger.

It was originally a four-party majority coalition government composed of Ordinary People and Independent Personalities (OĽaNO), We Are Family, Freedom and Solidarity (SaS), and For the People. Following a coalition crisis in summer of 2022, SaS left the government, which resulted in a minority government.

The Cabinet was appointed by the President of Slovakia Zuzana Čaputová on 1 April 2021 and was approved by the National Council on 4 May 2021. It was formed after the previous Prime Minister Igor Matovič and his government had resigned, ending a month-long coalition crisis which started because of a controversial Sputnik V COVID-19 vaccine purchase by Matovič. It was essentially a reshuffle during which Matovič changed positions with his party subordinate Heger, who was previously the Minister of Finance. Significant changes included the appointment of Vladimír Lengvarský as Minister of Health and President Čaputová rejecting the initial We Are Family nominee for Minister of Labour, Social Affairs and Family Jozef Hlinka, which resulted in the reappointment of Milan Krajniak.

The Cabinet lost a no-confidence vote on 15 December 2022 and ruled until it was succeeded by a caretaker government composed of non-party experts led by Ľudovít Ódor on 15 May 2023.

== Composition ==
Portfolio	Minister	Took office	Left office	Party
Government's Office
Prime Minister	Eduard Heger (Note: Joined Democrats on 7 March 2023.)	1 April 2021	15 May 2023	Ordinary People and Independent Personalities
Ministry of Finance
Deputy Prime Minister and Minister of Finance	Igor Matovič	1 April 2021	23 December 2022	Ordinary People and Independent Personalities
Deputy Prime Minister and Minister of Finance	Eduard Heger (Note: Acting minister.) (Note: Did not serve as deputy prime minister.)	23 December 2022	15 May 2023	Ordinary People and Independent Personalities
Deputy Prime Minister
Deputy Prime Minister for Legislation and Strategic Planning	Štefan Holý	1 April 2021	15 May 2023	We Are Family
Ministry of Economy
Deputy Prime Minister and Minister of Economy	Richard Sulík	1 April 2021	13 September 2022	Freedom and Solidarity
Deputy Prime Minister and Minister of Economy	Karel Hirman (Note: Independent, nominated by Ordinary People and Independent Personalities.)	13 September 2022	15 May 2023	Ordinary People and Independent Personalities
Ministry of Investment, Regional Development and Informatics
Deputy Prime Minister and Minister of Investments, Regional Development and Informatization	Veronika Remišová	1 April 2021	15 May 2023	For the People
Ministry of Transport and Construction
Minister of Transport and Construction	Andrej Doležal (Note: Independent, nominated by We Are Family.)	1 April 2021	15 May 2023	We Are Family
Ministry of Culture
Minister of Culture	Natália Milanová	1 April 2021	15 May 2023	Ordinary People and Independent Personalities
Ministry of Defence
Minister of Defence	Jaroslav Naď	1 April 2021	15 May 2023	Ordinary People and Independent Personalities
Ministry of Agriculture and Rural Development
Minister of Agriculture and Rural Development	Ján Mičovský	1 April 2021	8 June 2021	Ordinary People and Independent Personalities
Minister of Agriculture and Rural Development	Samuel Vlčan	8 June 2021	15 May 2023	Ordinary People and Independent Personalities
Ministry of Labour, Social Affairs and Family
Minister of Labour, Social Affairs and Family	Andrej Doležal	1 April 2021	9 April 2021	We Are Family
Minister of Labour, Social Affairs and Family	Milan Krajniak	9 April 2021	15 May 2023	We Are Family
Ministry of Health
Minister of Health	Vladimír Lengvarský	1 April 2021	3 March 2023	Ordinary People and Independent Personalities
Minister of Health	Eduard Heger	3 March 2023	15 May 2023	Ordinary People and Independent Personalities
Ministry of Justice
Minister of Justice	Mária Kolíková (Note: Originally nominated by For the People.)	1 April 2021	13 September 2022	Freedom and Solidarity
Minister of Justice	Viliam Karas	13 September 2022	15 May 2023	Ordinary People and Independent Personalities
Ministry of Education, Science, Research and Sport
Minister of Education, Science, Research and Sport	Branislav Gröhling	1 April 2021	13 September 2022	Freedom and Solidarity
Minister of Education, Science, Research and Sport	Eduard Heger	13 September 2022	4 October 2022	Ordinary People and Independent Personalities
Minister of Education, Science, Research and Sport	Ján Horecký	4 October 2022	15 May 2023	Ordinary People and Independent Personalities
Ministry of Foreign and European Affairs
Minister of Foreign and European Affairs	Ivan Korčok (Note: Independent, nominated by Freedom and Solidarity.)	1 April 2021	13 September 2022	Freedom and Solidarity
Minister of Foreign and European Affairs	Rastislav Káčer	13 September 2022	15 May 2023	Ordinary People and Independent Personalities
Ministry of the Environment
Minister of Environment	Ján Budaj	1 April 2021	15 May 2023	Ordinary People and Independent Personalities
Ministry of Interior
Minister of Interior	Roman Mikulec	1 April 2021	15 May 2023	Ordinary People and Independent Personalities

== Party composition ==
From the appointment until 5 September 2022 the following parties formed the government:

Party	Ideology	Leader	Deputies	Ministers
OĽaNO	Anti-corruption populism	Igor Matovič	53 / 150	8 / 16
SR	National conservatism	Boris Kollár	17 / 150	3 / 16
SaS	Liberalism	Richard Sulík	13 / 150	3 / 16
ZĽ	Liberal conservatism	Veronika Remišová	10 / 150	2 / 16
Total			93 / 150	16

After the SaS left the government the governing parties were the following:

Party	Ideology	Leader	Deputies	Ministers
OĽaNO	Anti-corruption populism	Igor Matovič	47 / 150	12 / 16
SR	National conservatism	Boris Kollár	20 / 150	3 / 16
ZĽ	Liberal conservatism	Veronika Remišová	3 / 150	1 / 16
Total			70 / 150	16

In the end of governing parties were the following:

Party	Ideology	Leader	Deputies	Ministers
Demokrati	Liberal conservatism	Eduard Heger	13 / 150	5 / 16
OĽaNO	Anti-corruption populism	Igor Matovič	37 / 150	3 / 16
SR	National conservatism	Boris Kollár	16 / 150	3 / 16
ZĽ	Liberal conservatism	Veronika Remišová	1 / 150	1 / 16
Total			67 / 150	12

== Confidence motion ==
Motion of confidence Eduard Heger (OĽaNO)
Ballot →	4 May 2021
Required majority →	73 out of 144 (simple)
Yes: • OĽaNO (51); • Sme Rodina (17); • SaS (11); • Za ľudí (10)	89 / 150
No: • SMER-SD (25); • ĽSNS (9); • Independents (21)	53 / 150
Absentions	0 / 150
Absentees: • OĽaNO (2); • SMER-SD (1); • SaS (2); • Independents (1)	6 / 150

Motion of no-confidence Eduard Heger (OĽaNO)
Ballot →	15 December 2022
Required majority →	76 out of 102 (absolute)
Yes: • SMER-SD (27); • SaS (20); • Sme Rodina (3); • Independents (28)	78 / 150
No: • OĽaNO (1); • Sme Rodina (15); • Independents (4)	20 / 150
Absentions: • Sme Rodina (2); • Independents (2)	4 / 150
Absentees: • OĽaNO (46); • Independents (2)	48 / 150

== Coalition crisis ==
=== The "pro-family package" bill and SaS ultimatum ===
Following the overriding of her veto of the "pro-family package" bill, President Zuzana Čaputová asked the Supreme Court to examine the bill's compliance with the law and to render it ineffective, giving reasons she had previously articulated. The Supreme Court later confirmed that parts of the bill were, in fact, unlawful, and that the use of the shortened legislative process was not warranted.

The main reason for the SaS leaving the coalition, after giving an ultimatum, were the actions of Igor Matovič as Minister of Finance. They cited Matovič's breaking of the President's veto of the "pro-family package" with the help of MPs from the far-right, Neo-Nazi People's Party Our Slovakia (ĽSNS) party (it was unacceptable for SaS that the government be aided by these far-right MPs when passing laws). SaS stated that since Heger failed to intervene and solve these issues, they decided to take this step.

=== OĽaNO support to Matovič ===
OĽaNO MP and chair of the parliamentary defense committee Juraj Krúpa announced his departure from OĽaNO and joined the SaS parliamentary caucus. He also became the team leader for defense within SaS. Krúpa was the only OĽaNO MP who did not vote for the "pro-family package" bill. On 11 August, OĽaNO announced that the party leadership, along with their parliamentary caucus, decided that Matovič would remain Minister of Finance, in spite of SaS's ultimatum.

Three official meetings of the former coalition leaders from all four parties took place in the government's Hotel Bôrik. SaS consistently refused to retract its ultimatum, but Richard Sulík clarified that if OĽaNO suggested he step down as a price for Matovič's resignation, he would be willing to do so. On 31 August, the last day of the ultimatum, OĽaNO announced that Matovič could resign if SaS agreed to ten proposals by OĽaNO. These included various policies which SaS disagreed with long-term, such as tax raises, support for some form of the "pro-family package", and a proposal that SaS ministers or MPs would not be able to propose new laws requiring public spending without proposing the resources which should be used to cover those new expenses.

However, the ten-point proposal by OĽaNO was rejected by SaS, and Sulík announced that he had already made the president aware of his resignation as Minister of Economy earlier that day. SaS further stated that Matovič had until 5 September to resign or else the resignation of the remaining three ministers from SaS would follow.

In September, the parliamentary caucus of We Are Family was joined by three independent MPs, among them a former ĽSNS MP Jozef Šimko.

=== Ministers resignation ===
Since OĽaNO decided that Igor Matovič would remain, Korčok, Kolíková, and Gröhling announced their resignations on 5 September, and President Zuzana Čaputová accepted them on 13 September. She appointed cross-party nominees Rastislav Káčer as Minister of Foreign Affairs, Viliam Karas as Minister of Justice, and Karel Hirman as Minister of Economy. PM Heger was appointed interim Minister of Education until the appointment of Ján Horecký on 4 October.

== Minority government ==
=== No-confidence vote in Matovič ===
After the government lost its majority, SaS, now an opposition party, initiated a motion of no-confidence in Matovič. He spoke in his own defence and attacked the media in his speech. In response, an open letter condemning these attacks was issued by the representatives of the most prominent Slovak media outlets. Several international press organizations also condemned the attacks.

Following the vote, SaS pointed out that Matovič was not removed only because of the three opposition MPs (who ran for ĽSNS) did not vote in favor of the motion, even though previously these MPs consistently voted in favor of no-confidence motions concerning ministers of Heger and Matovič's cabinets.

=== No-confidence vote in government ===
After Martin Klus left the SaS parliamentary caucus, OĽANO parliamentary caucus chairman Michal Šipoš postponed an gremium meeting between the party members. Matovič went to the Presidential Palace, signed his resignation and handed it to the President's Chief of Staff who then passed it onto his assistant in order to make a copy. When the assistant returned the original and the copy of the resignation to the Chief of Staff, Matovič took both documents from his hands, said he changed his mind, and left.

== Cabinet with restricted powers ==
Following the vote of no-confidence, President Čaputová formally dismissed the Cabinet of Eduard Heger, and appointed it as interim government with restricted powers. Ten OĽANO MPs from the Civic and Democratic Platform who were advocating for a cabinet reshuffle left the OĽANO parliamentary caucus, reasoning they no longer had impact on the decisions of OĽANO. On 22 December, the parliament passed the 2023 budget with a deficit of €8 billion. SaS supported the budget after several of its proposals were worked in following negotiations with Prime Minister Heger. These included expenditure limits, cancellation of concession fees to fund the state TV and radio as well as a lowered 10% tax on hospitality and sports venues services.

After Matovič resigned as Minister of Finance, President Čaputová removed him from the office and appointed Heger as Interim Minister of Finance on 23 December. Upon being removed from the office, Matovič shared multiple posts using his Facebook profile centered around LGBT issues to attack the Slovak mainstream news media. Heger criticised Matovič, and both admitted that the departures of Heger and Minister of Defence Jaroslav Naď from OĽANO were likely in the close future.

=== Attempts for a new majority ===
On 9 January 2023, Eduard Heger announced that he would attempt to form a new government supported by a parliamentary majority. Heger later announced his attempts to form a new majority ended. A parliamentary majority voted for an early election that occurred on 30 September 2023.

=== Succession by a caretaker government ===
Heger announced his departure from OĽANO on 6 March 2023, stating his different political views.

On 4 May, Minister of Agriculture Samuel Vlčan requested that his appointment be revoked after it became clear that his family company was chosen to receive €1.42 million from the Ministry of Environment's EU-provided funds.

On the next day, Minister of Foreign Affairs Rastislav Káčer informed the President of his request that his appointment be revoked, believing that a dismissed cabinet should only remain in power for the necessary short period of time while Heger's dismissed government was to rule for over nine months following its fall..

Despite Heger's initial attempts to avoid a caretaker government, on 7 May he requested that his appointment be revoked. President Čaputová announced on 15 May that she would appoint a caretaker government consisting of non-party experts led by Ľudovít Ódor, which would rule until a new cabinet was formed after the early election on 30 September 2023.
