= Ján Mičovský =

Slovak politician

Agriculture Minister of Slovakia
- In office 21 March 2020 – 8 June 2021
- President: Zuzana Čaputová
- Prime Minister: Igor Matovič; Eduard Heger
- Preceded by: Gabriela Matečná
- Succeeded by: Samuel Vlčan

Personal details
- Born: 26 December 1954 (age 71) Zvolen, Czechoslovakia
- Party: Ordinary People
- Education: Mendel University Brno
- Occupation: Politician

Ing. Ján Mičovský CSc. (born 1954) is a Slovak forester, anti-corruption campaigner and politician. He was the Minister of Agriculture and Rural Development in the cabinets of Igor Matovič and Eduard Heger.

In 2009, Mičovský became a whistleblower over suspicions that the state-owned forestry company LESY SR (which he had worked for since 2002) was losing millions of euros due to corruption and a lack of transparency in its allocation of hunting grounds. He resigned from the company in January 2010.

From 2012 to 2016, Mičovský was a member of the National Council during the 2012-2016 term, being elected as an OĽaNO member.

Mičovský announced his resignation on 25 May 2021 after his nomination for chair of the Slovak Land Fund, Gabriela Bartošová was arrested and charged in relation with a bribery case. He recommended Martin Fecko as his replacement. On 7 June, Mičovský attempted to rescind his resignation after "supportive reactions" and a petition asking him not to "run away from the fight", but as there is no grounds for this in the Slovak constitution, Prime Minister of Slovakia Eduard Heger was allowed to nominate a replacement to Mičovský's post. He was replaced by Samuel Vlčan, a former banker who was a secretary of state at the ministry for a period in 2020.

Mičovský returned to the National Council as a deputy on 15 June 2021, sitting as part of the OĽaNO group. He resigned from OĽaNO in January 2022, saying that he had lost confidence in the party's ability to deal with corruption. Plus jeden deň later reported that Mičovský was working closely with For the People, another anti-corruption party which forms part of the coalition government.
