= Mária Kolíková =

Slovak politician

Member of the National Council
- Incumbent
- Assumed office 13 September 2022

Minister of Justice
- In office 1 April 2021 – 13 September 2022
- President: Zuzana Čaputová
- Prime Minister: Eduard Heger
- Preceded by: Veronika Remišová (acting)
- Succeeded by: Viliam Karas
- In office 21 March 2020 – 23 March 2021
- President: Zuzana Čaputová
- Prime Minister: Igor Matovič
- Preceded by: Gábor Gál
- Succeeded by: Veronika Remišová (acting)

Personal details
- Born: 29 August 1974 (age 52) Dunajská Streda, Czechoslovakia
- Party: SaS (2022–present)
- Other political affiliations: For the People (2019–2021)
- Education: Comenius University
- Profession: lawyer

Mária Kolíková is a Slovak politician who currently serves as an MP of the National Council. She was the Justice Minister of Slovakia between 2020 and 2022, serving in the cabinets of Igor Matovič and Eduard Heger.

== Legal background ==
Kolíková graduated from the Law Faculty of Comenius University in Bratislava in 1999. She subsequently worked as a trainee lawyer from 2002 before becoming a lawyer in 2003. From 2007 until 2010 she worked at the Mária Kolíková law firm. She later operated as a lawyer for the firm Kolíková & Partners.

== Political career ==
On 21 March 2020 Kolíková was appointed as the Justice Minister of Slovakia; she was nominated by For the People (Za ľudí). She was working on reforming the judiciary system and reducing corruption by investigating corrupt justices and improving public trust in the judiciary. Kolíková had previously worked in the Justice Ministry when Lucia Žitňanská was minister. Kolíková was one of a number of ministers to step down from their positions in Matovič's Cabinet in March 2021, in an attempt to return in a new cabinet.

In September 2021, after several disagreements with the leader Veronika Remišová, Kolíková left For the People. She joined the party Freedom and Solidarity (SaS) as a member in June 2022, becoming their nominee.

In September 2022, Kolíková resigned from the Cabinet of Eduard Heger along with other SAS ministers due to disagreements with political decisions of Igor Matovič and returned to the Parliament where she joined the Freedom and Solidarity caucus. She was replaced in her role of Minister of Justice by Viliam Karas.
