= Roman Mikulec =

Slovak politician (born 1972)

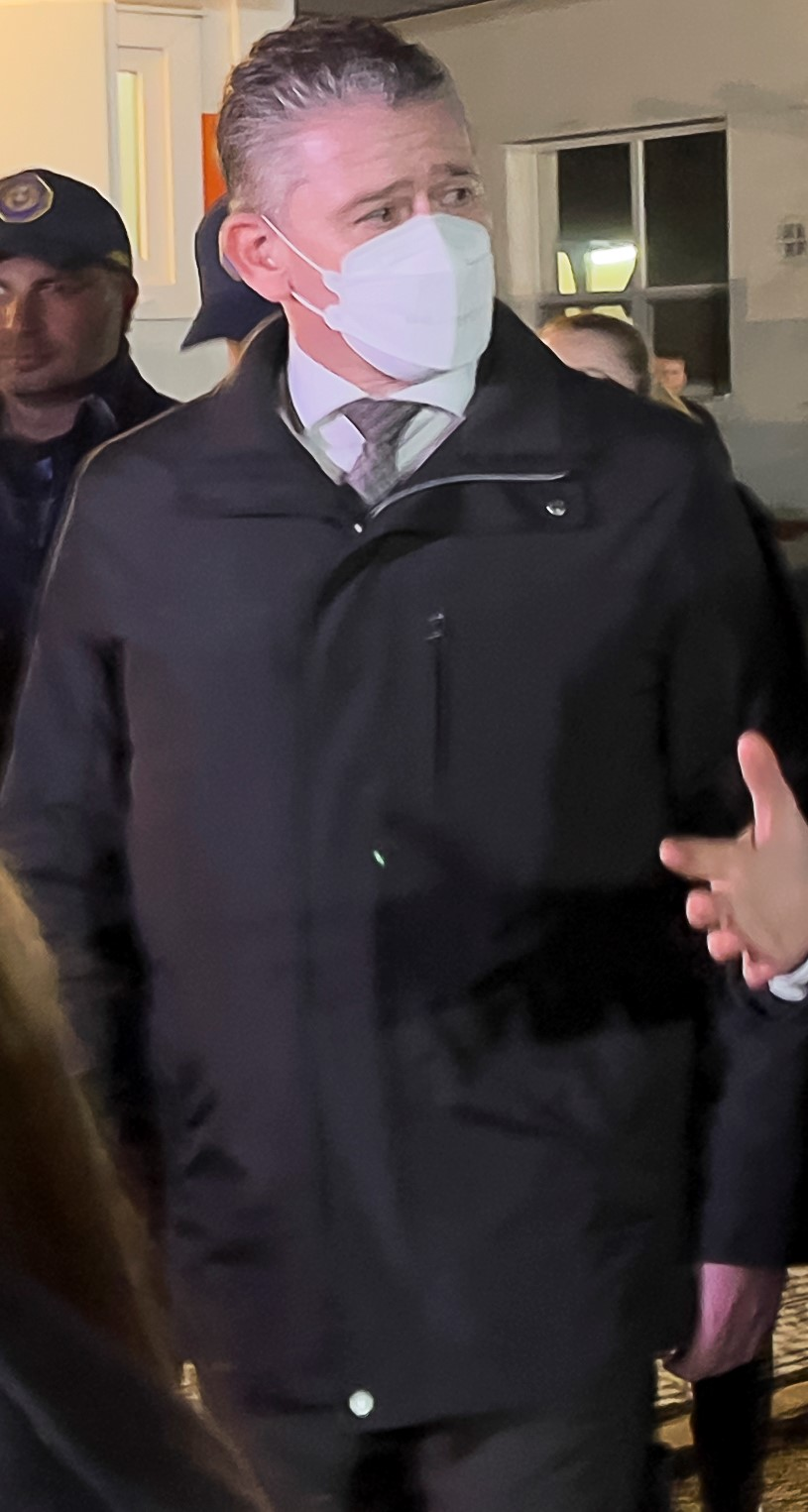

Minister of Interior
- In office 21 March 2020 – 15 May 2023
- President: Zuzana Čaputová
- Prime Minister: Igor Matovič; Eduard Heger
- Preceded by: Denisa Saková
- Succeeded by: Ivan Šimko

Personal details
- Born: March 18, 1972 (age 54) Bratislava, Czechoslovakia (now Slovakia)
- Party: Ordinary People and Independent Personalities (2019–present)
- Education: Military Air Force Academy in Košice

Military service
- Allegiance: Slovakia
- Branch/service: Slovak Air Force; Slovak Military Intelligence
- Years of service: 1994–2012
- Rank: Colonel

Roman Mikulec (born 18 March 1972) is a Slovak politician and former soldier who served as the Interior Minister of Slovakia from 2020 to 2023. He was succeeded by Ivan Šimko in May 2023.

== Education ==
In 1994, Mikulec graduated with a Master's degree at the Military Air Force Academy in Košice (today Faculty of Aeronautics of Technical University of Košice). He also holds a M.Sc. in law, economics and management from the Brno International Business School (B.I.B.S.).

== Career ==
After a short time as a fighter pilot, in 1997 Mikulec joined the Military Intelligence Service, eventually becoming its director. He was charged with sabotage, defamation and disclosing classified information in 2013, but was acquitted in 2019.

In 2020 parliamentary election, Mikulec stood for Ordinary People, an anti-corruption party. He received 7435 preferential votes and was elected to the National Council.

Mikulec was made Minister for the Interior on 21 March 2020. He survived a no-confidence motion on 20 September 2022; there were 58 votes for the motion, 48 against and 39 abstentions. The motion failed because a majority of the National Council, 76 votes, was needed for it to be passed. He survived another no-confidence motion on 1 December where there were 71 votes for, 47 against and 23 abstentions. The Heger government itself lost a no confidence vote on 15 December, ruling as an interim administration until a technocratic caretaker government was formed by Ľudovít Ódor in May 2023. Mikulec was then replaced by Ivan Šimko.

== See also ==
- Cabinet of Igor Matovič
