= Natália Milanová =

Slovak politician

Minister of Culture of the Slovak Republic
- In office 21 March 2020 – 15 May 2023
- President: Zuzana Čaputová
- Prime Minister: Igor Matovič; Eduard Heger
- Preceded by: Ľubica Laššáková
- Succeeded by: Silvia Hroncová

Personal details
- Born: Natália Gálisová; 12 June 1982 (age 43) Bratislava, Czechoslovakia (now Slovakia)
- Party: Ordinary People
- Education: Comenius University

Natália Milanová (née Gálisová; born 12 June 1982 in Bratislava) is a Slovak politician who has served as the Minister of Culture in the Government of Slovakia since 2020. She was appointed by Prime Minister Igor Matovič after the 2020 election.

Having worked for the OĽaNO movement since 2014, Milanová was elected in the 2016 Slovak parliamentary election, running on the OĽaNO candidate list from twelfth place. She was not elected as a Member of Parliament with 1,737 votes (0.6%), but elected as a substitute from 22nd place. She took the oath of office on 30 January 2018.

In September 2022 she received the Order of Princess Olga, 3rd class from the President of Ukraine Volodymyr Zelenskyy for her support of Ukrainian sovereignty and territorial integrity, in particular by sheltering Ukrainian artists and art objects during the Russo-Ukrainian War and sanctioning Russian propaganda outlets.
