= Dubovcová =

Dubovcová is a surname. Notable people with the surname include:

- Jana Dubovcová (1952–2026), Slovak lawyer and politician
- Natália Dubovcová (born 1990), Slovak beach volleyball player
