= Samuel Vlčan =

Slovak politician

Agriculture and Rural Minister of Slovakia
- In office 8 June 2021 – 4 May 2023
- President: Zuzana Čaputová
- Prime Minister: Eduard Heger
- Preceded by: Ján Mičovský

Personal details
- Born: 13 March 1971 (age 55) Partizánske, Czechoslovakia
- Education: Comenius University

Samuel Vlčan (born 13 March 1971) is a Slovak politician and lawyer who served as the Minister of Agriculture and Rural Development of Slovakia from 2021 to 2023.

== Biography ==
Born in Partizánske, Vlčan was educated at grammar schools in Topoľčany and Banská Štiavnica, after which he studied at Moscow State Institute of International Relations. Vlčan studied law at the Comenius University between 1990 and 1995. Vlčan later worked in finance, being head lawyer of UniCredit Bank Slovakia and Slovenská Sporiteľňa as well as Member of the Board. He also served as the General Manager of Hypo Alpe Adria Bank in Bosnia and Herzegovina and the Slovak branch of Sberbank.

In April 2023, a company owned by Vlčan was reportedly allocated 1.4 million eur in funding from the Ministry of Environmental Affairs. Vlčan resigned on 4 May but refused to give up the subsidy. His affair led to the collapse of the Cabinet of Eduard Heger.
