= Ján Horecký (minister) =

Slovak teacher and politician (born 1968)

Member of the National Council of the Slovak Republic
- Incumbent
- Assumed office 25 October 2023

Minister of Education, Science, Research and Sport
- In office 4 October 2022 – 15 May 2023
- Prime Minister: Eduard Heger
- Preceded by: Branislav Gröhling
- Succeeded by: Daniel Bútora

Personal details
- Born: 23 June 1968 (age 58) Trenčín, Czechoslovakia
- Party: KDH (2023–present)
- Education: Comenius University

Ján Horecký (born 23 June 1968) is a Slovak teacher and politician who serves as a member of the National Council of Slovakia. He had previously served as the Minister of Education, Science, Research and Sport in the Cabinet of Eduard Heger.

== Teaching career ==
Horecký graduated in teaching of Mathematics and Geography at Comenius University in 1991 and worked as a teacher at Ján Papánek High School in Bratislava until 1997. He taught at Gymnasium Jur Honec from 1997 until 2003 before moving to United School in Tilgnerova 14, Bratislava, between 2004 and 2008. Horecký became the Principal of the Catholic St. Francis United School, a position he held from 2008 until 2020. Between 2011 and 2019, Horecký served as the chairman of the Union of Catholic Schools in Slovakia. In 2022, he became the Director of Felix, a network of private schools.

== Political career ==
From 2006 until 2010 and again in 2014, he served as a councilor of the Karlova Ves borough of Bratislava. T position of Minister of Education became vacant in 2022 after the Freedom and Solidarity party left the government and its ministers reigned. Horecký came recommended to the PM Eduard Heger by the influential Conservative MP Richard Vašečka. Horecký's conservative values made him acceptable also to the Speaker of the Parliament Boris Kollár who insisted the post is filled by a "conservative-leaning expert".

On 4 October 2022, president Zuzana Čaputová appointed Horecký as Minister of Education, Science, Research and Sport of the Slovakia at the request of prime minister Eduard Heger. She stated that the Minister meets the requirements of the Tricoalition for a conservative-oriented expert, but reminded him that by appointing him, he ceases to be the manager of a single network of schools with a clear-cut world-view.

In May 2023, after Horecký was replaced by technocratic minister Daniel Bútora, he entered the Christian Democratic Movement to run for the party in the parliamentary election.
