= OĽaNO and Friends =

OĽaNO and Friends OĽaNO a priatelia
- Leader: Igor Matovič
- Founded: 26 May 2023
- Registered: 3 July 2023
- Ideology: Conservatism; Populism; Christian right Liberal conservatism
- Political position: Centre-right
- Colours: Grey
- National Council: 14 / 150

Website
- obycajniludia.sk

OĽaNO and Friends (Slovak: OĽaNO a priatelia), officially OĽaNO and Friends: Ordinary People (OĽaNO), Independent Candidates (NEKA), NOVA, Free and Responsible, Pačivale Roma, Magyar szívek and Christian Union and For the People (Slovak: OĽANO A PRIATELIA: OBYČAJNÍ ĽUDIA (OĽANO), NEZÁVISLÍ KANDIDÁTI (NEKA), NOVA, SLOBODNÍ A ZODPOVEDNÍ, PAČIVALE ROMA, MAGYAR SZÍVEK a Kresťanská únia a ZA ĽUDÍ), is a conservative political coalition in Slovakia established on 26 May 2023.

== History ==
On 26 May 2023 Ordinary People and Independent Personalities leader Igor Matovič announced the creation of the OĽaNO and Friends coalition through the legal renaming of the OĽaNO party. The coalition initially included OĽaNO, NOVA, Free and Responsible, Roma and Hungarian platforms, and a platform of bipartisan candidates. On 2 July 2023, the parties Christian Union and For the People parties joined the coalition. The parties ran with a single list for the parliamentary elections on 30 September 2023. The coalition obtained 8.9% of the votes for a total of 16 seats, significantly worse than the result obtained by the previous OĽaNO-led coalition in the 2020 election.

== Members ==
Name	Ideology	Position	Leader	MPs	MEPs
Slovakia Movement; Hnutie Slovensko	Populism	Centre-right	Igor Matovič	11 / 150	0 / 15
Christian Union; Kresťanská únia	Christian right	Right-wing	Milan Krajniak	2 / 150	0 / 15
For the People; Za ľudí	Liberal conservatism	Centre-right	Veronika Remišová	1 / 150	0 / 15

== Election results ==
=== National Council ===
Election	Leader	Votes	%	Rank	Seats	+/–	Government
2023	Igor Matovič	264,137	8.9	▲5th	16 / 150	New	Opposition
