= Karel Hirman =

Slovak engineer, manager and politician (born 1970)

Minister of Economy of the Slovak Republic
- In office 13 September 2022 – 15 May 2023
- President: Zuzana Čaputová
- Prime Minister: Eduard Heger
- Preceded by: Richard Sulík
- Succeeded by: Peter Dovhun

Personal details
- Born: 1 June 1970 (age 55)

Karel Hirman (born 1 June 1970) is a Slovak engineer, manager and politician. Since September 2022 he has served as the Economy minister of Slovakia.

== Early life ==
Hirman studied oil and gas extraction and transport at the Gubkin Russian State University of Oil and Gas and mining at the Technical University of Košice.

== Professional career ==
After graduation, Hirman worked as a journalist for the Czech Press Agency as well the Slovak Economic weekly Trend, covering the Commonwealth of Independent States and energy topics.

Since 2005, Herman managed several energy companies in Slovakia, including Košice public heating provider Tepláreň Košice, state-owned oil transportation company TRANSPETROL as well as nickel distributor ENERGY-METAL.

Herman was in charge of implementation of a large-scale energy consumption optimization project funded by the European Investment Bank in the Prešov region. Between 2007 and 2014 he headed the energy department of the Slovak Innovation and Energy Agency. He is also a regular contributor to the outputs of the think tank Slovak Foreign Policy Association.

== Political career ==
Hirman served as an advisor to multiple politician, including the Foreign Affairs minister Miroslav Lajčák and the Prime Minister Iveta Radičová. He also advised the Christian Democratic Movement and the Progressive Slovakia parties on their energy policies. He also served in the team of Ivan Mikloš advising the Ukrainian prime minister Volodymyr Groysman.

Following the abdication of Richard Sulík, Hirman was included in the government as a Minister of the Economy on 13 September 2022.
