= Viliam Karas =

Slovak lawyer

Minister of Justice of the Slovak Republic
- In office 13 September 2022 – 15 May 2023
- Prime Minister: Eduard Heger
- Preceded by: Mária Kolíková
- Succeeded by: Jana Dubovcová

Personal details
- Born: 2 April 1976 (age 50) Prešov, Czechoslovakia
- Party: KDH (2023–present)
- Children: 4
- Education: Comenius University; University of Trnava

Viliam Karas (born 2 April 1976) is a Slovak lawyer and politician. He served as the Minister of Justice of Slovakia from September 2022 to May 2023.

== Early life ==
Karas was born in Prešov on 2 April 1976. He studied law at the Comenius University, graduating in 1999, and was awarded a PhD. in law at the University of Trnava in 2002.

== Political career ==
Between 1 January 2021 and September 2022, Karas served as chairman of the Slovak Bar Association, after which he became government minister.

On 30 August 2023, Karas announced that he would become a KDH expert in the areas of law, justice and security. Karas would work for the party as a non-party member.

== Personal life ==
Apart from his native Slovak, Karas can speak English and Italian. He is married with four children.
