= Dobrý Anjel =

Slovak non-profit humanitarian organization

- Founded: June 20, 2006
- Founder: Igor Brossmann & Andrej Kiska
- Location: Poprad, Slovakia
- Region served: Slovakia
- Method: Donations
- Members: 141.376 (19 Mar 2014)
- Endowment: € 21.9 million (19 Mar 2014)
- Website: dobryanjel.sk

Dobrý Anjel (translated as Good Angel) is a non-profit humanitarian organization in Slovakia. It provides monthly financial assistance to families with children facing severe financial distress due to a serious illness affecting either a parent or a child (such as cancer, cerebral palsy, cystic fibrosis, muscular dystrophy, or chronic kidney failure).

== History and founders ==
The organization was founded in 2006 by entrepreneur Andrej Kiska (who later served as the President of Slovakia from 2014 to 2019) and Igor Brossmann. In 2011, Igor Brossmann resigned from all official positions within the organization. Andrej Kiska donated €1 million of his personal funds—earned from the sale of his consumer finance businesses—to establish the foundation, which was used to cover the organization's operational and administrative expenses during its initial years.

== Operating model and pillars ==
Dobrý Anjel operates based on three strict pillars:

- To the last cent: 100% of the financial contributions received from donors are distributed directly to the families in need. The operational costs of the foundation are covered by the founders' initial funds, financial interest, and corporate partners.
- Every month: Financial assistance is paid out regularly every month, helping families cover ongoing treatment costs and everyday living expenses.
- Transparency: Every donor receives a unique tracking number ("Angel Number"). Upon logging into the portal, the donor can see exactly which specific family (including their name and address) received their contribution that month.

To prevent system abuse, families cannot apply for aid directly. Recipients are nominated and verified by treating physicians who are familiar with both the medical severity and the economic status of the family.

== Expansion to the Czech Republic ==
In 2011, the successful Slovak model inspired the creation of a sister organization in the Czech Republic. The Czech foundation, Dobrý Anděl, adopted identical pillars and operating structures from the Slovak organization.

== Help in numbers ==
The financial operations and annual audits are published regularly in official annual reports. By the end of 2024, the foundation had distributed over €75 million to families facing illness and hardship, with all details documented in their comprehensive financial reporting.
