= Andrej Doležal =

Slovak politician (born 1981)

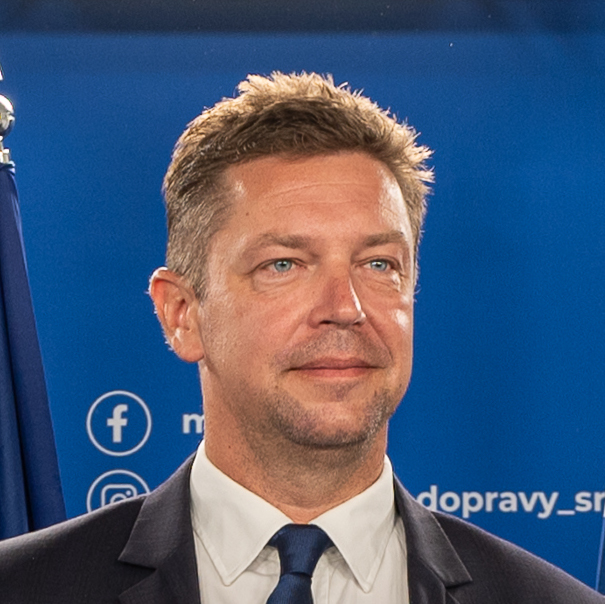

15th minister of transport of the Slovak Republic
- In office 21 March 2020 – 15 May 2023
- President: Zuzana Čaputová
- Prime Minister: Igor Matovič; Eduard Heger
- Preceded by: Árpád Érsek
- Succeeded by: Pavol Lančarič

15th minister of labour, social affairs and family of the Slovak Republic
- In office 17 March 2021 – 9 April 2021
- President: Zuzana Čaputová
- Prime Minister: Igor Matovič; Eduard Heger
- Preceded by: Milan Krajniak
- Succeeded by: Milan Krajniak

25th minister of economy of the Slovak Republic
- In office 23 March 2021 – 1 April 2021
- President: Zuzana Čaputová
- Prime Minister: Igor Matovič
- Preceded by: Richard Sulík
- Succeeded by: Richard Sulík

Personal details
- Born: 23 March 1981 (age 45) Bratislava, Slovakia, Czechoslovakia
- Party: nominee We Are Family
- Education: Slovak Technical University

Andrej Doležal (born 23 March 1981) is a Slovak politician. He served as minister of transport from 21 March 2020 til 15 May 2023.
