= Richard Sulík =

Slovak politician, economist and businessman

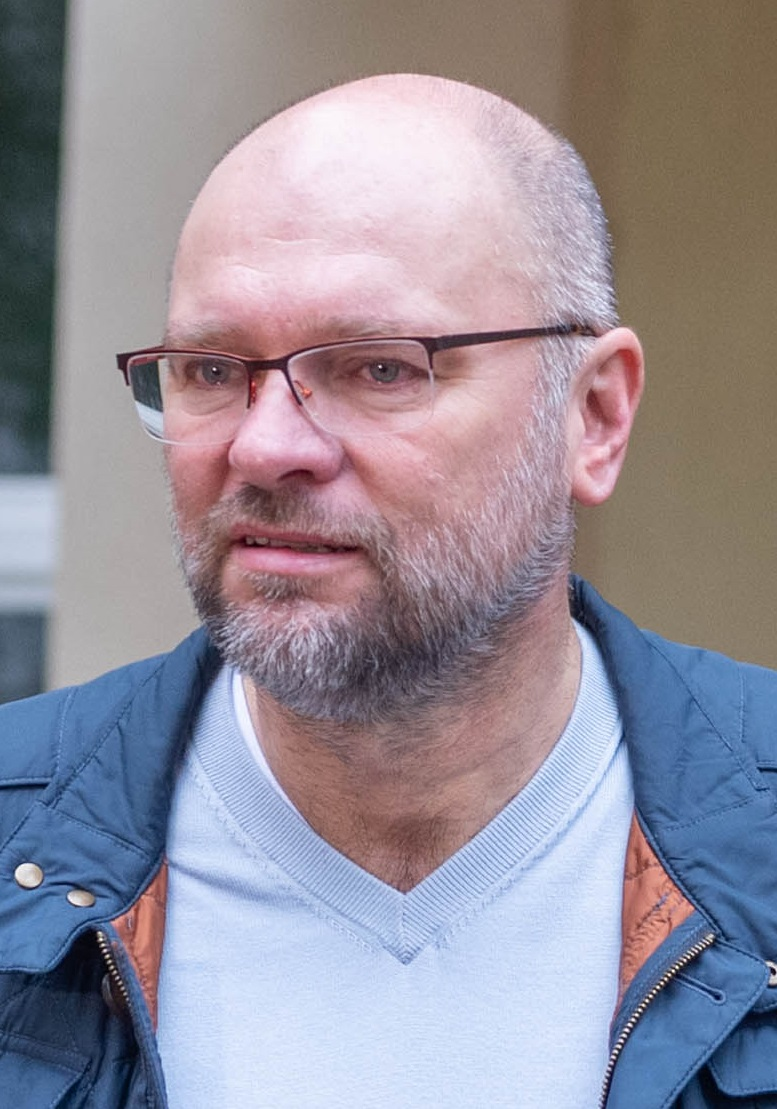
- Sulík in 2022

Deputy Prime Minister of Slovakia
- In office 1 April 2021 – 13 September 2022 Serving with Štefan Holý, Veronika Remišová, Igor Matovič
- Prime Minister: Eduard Heger
- In office 21 March 2020 – 23 March 2021 Serving with Eduard Heger, Štefan Holý, Veronika Remišová
- Prime Minister: Igor Matovič

Minister of Economy
- In office 1 April 2021 – 13 September 2022
- Prime Minister: Eduard Heger
- Preceded by: Andrej Doležal (acting)
- Succeeded by: Karel Hirman
- In office 21 March 2020 – 23 March 2021
- Prime Minister: Igor Matovič
- Preceded by: Peter Žiga
- Succeeded by: Andrej Doležal (acting)

Speaker of the National Council
- In office 8 July 2010 – 13 October 2011
- Preceded by: Pavol Paška
- Succeeded by: Pavol Hrušovský

Member of the National Council
- In office 13 September 2022 – 4 September 2024
- In office 8 July 2010 – 1 July 2014

Member of the European Parliament for Slovakia
- In office 2 July 2014 – 1 July 2019

Chairman of Freedom and Solidarity
- In office 28 March 2009 – 16 March 2024
- Preceded by: Office established
- Succeeded by: Branislav Gröhling

Personal details
- Born: 12 January 1968 (age 58) Bratislava, Czechoslovakia (now Slovakia)
- Party: We Are Family (since 2026)
- Other political affiliations: Freedom and Solidarity (2009–2026)
- Education: LMU Munich; University of Economics in Bratislava
- Website: http://sulik.sk/

Richard Sulík (Note: Slovak pronunciation: [ˈrixart ˈsuliːk]) (born 12 January 1968) is a Slovak politician, economist, and business magnate. He founded and was the leader of the political party Freedom and Solidarity until 2024 and served as Deputy Prime Minister for Economy and Minister of Economy in Government of Slovakia led by Eduard Heger. Sulik and his party resigned from the government on 31 August 2022.

== Life ==
Sulík was born in Czechoslovakia in 1968, and raised in Pforzheim, West Germany, where he arrived with his parents in 1980. In 1987, he entered LMU Munich to study physics, before switching to studying economics in 1989. Returning to Slovakia in 1991, he founded a company called FaxCOPY, while also studying taxation at the University of Economics in Bratislava. From 2002 to 2003, he was an advisor to Ivan Miklos (then Minister of Finance), whose tax reform (which included a 19% flat tax) he helped pass. He remained on the Slovak finance ministry's advisory board in 2006–2007, and founded his party, Freedom and Solidarity, in 2009.

== Political career ==
In 2010, Sulík replaced Pavol Paška as the Speaker of Parliament. A former migrant himself, Sulík has strongly opposed the acceptance of subsidiarily protected migrants from the Middle East, and has expressed anti-Islamic views, stating: "I don't want to live in a Europe where more Muslims are born than Christians."

=== 2020 ===
After Freedom and Solidarity received 6% votes in the 2020 Slovak parliamentary election, Sulík was personally promised the Ministry of Economy, to which Igor Matovič denied. They dared to resign, with Matovič saying he would upon accomplishing what he had promised to his voters before the election. Tensions soon arose, the Coalition Agreement signed by the four parties was especially ignored by Matovič, who blamed all problems mostly via multiple social media.

As Freedom and Solidarity tried to block irritational measures due to the lack of regard for locals in specific districts and small business, Matovič asked during a press conference whether Sulík would be the one to go and dig the graves of the senior citizens. Prior to this, all citizens in the country had to get tested within a given date.

=== 2021: Cabinet of Eduard Heger ===
On 1 April 2021, following Eduard Heger's appointment as prime minister of Slovakia, Sulík was re-appointed deputy prime minister and minister of economy in Cabinet of Eduard Heger. According to most pollsters, the public viewed this measure as wasting public finances.

The same year in September, For the People fell apart and many defected to SaS, including the Minister of Justice. This was a gross violation of the Coalition Agreement, but Sulík insisted that the Minister of Justice Kolíková remains as the Minister of Justice.

=== 2022 ===
Sulík called the failure of early 2022 votes "the greatest defeat in the political career of Igor Matovič". There were also rumours on Matovič only shooting insults at SaS because he was doing horribly in polls. The same year in June, Matovič accused SaS of working with fascists as Republika, another neo-Nazi group in parliament, voted against the bill.

== Personal life ==
Sulík has four children: two each with his ex-wife Eva and Alexandra Šikrhová.

== See also ==
- Politics of Slovakia

== Notes ==
Political offices
Preceded by Pavol Paška	Speaker of the National Council; 2010–2011	Succeeded by Pavol Hrušovský
