= Andrej Kiska =

President of Slovakia from 2014 to 2019

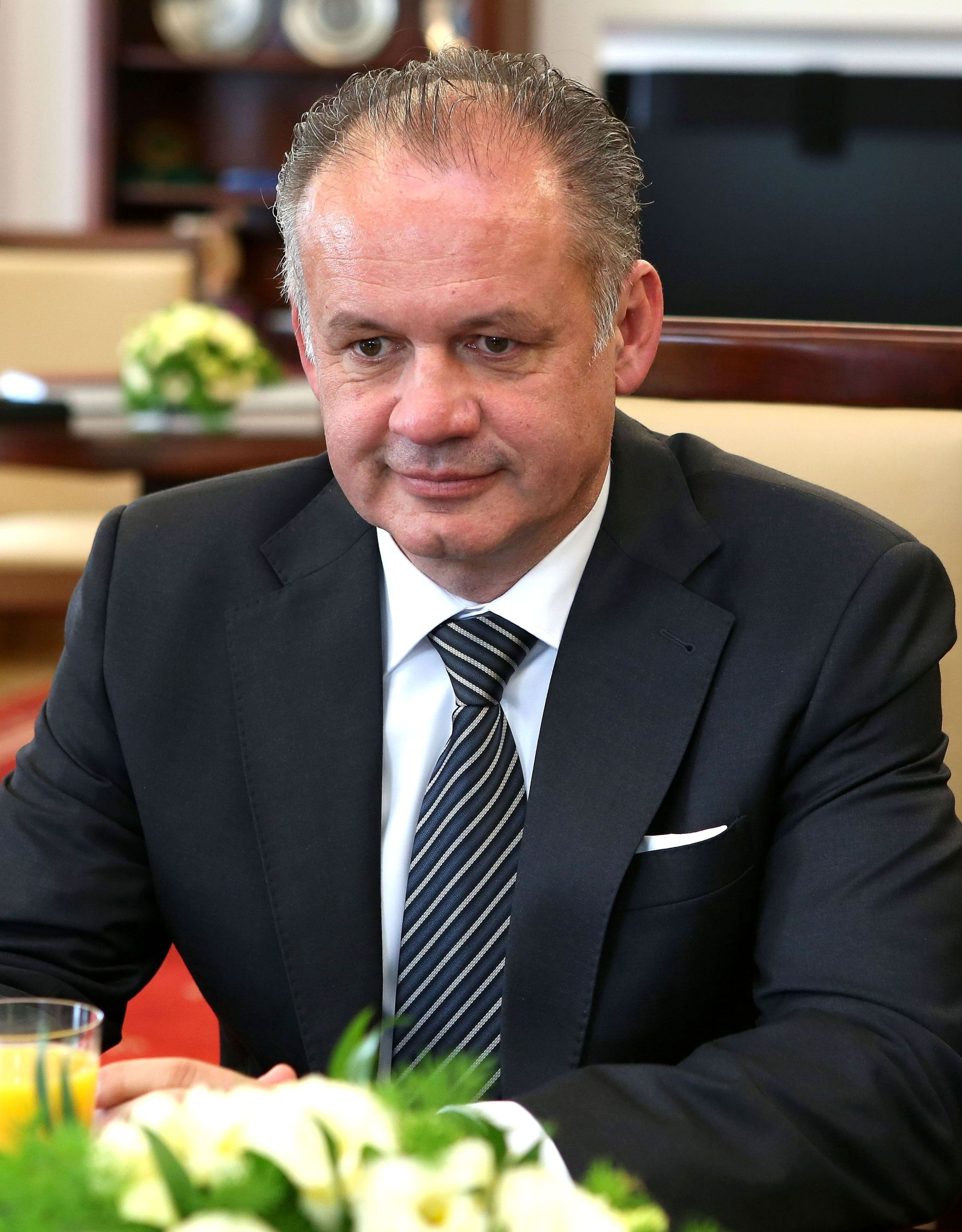
- Kiska in 2014

4th President of Slovakia
- In office 15 June 2014 – 15 June 2019
- Prime Minister: Robert Fico; Peter Pellegrini
- Preceded by: Ivan Gašparovič
- Succeeded by: Zuzana Čaputová

Chairman of For the People
- In office 28 September 2019 – 8 August 2020
- Preceded by: Office established
- Succeeded by: Veronika Remišová

Personal details
- Born: 2 February 1963 (age 63) Poprad, Czechoslovakia
- Party: For the People (2019–2021)
- Spouse(s): Mária Kisková (m. 1983; div. 2001) Martina Kisková (Živorová) (m. 2003)
- Children: 5
- Education: Slovak University of Technology
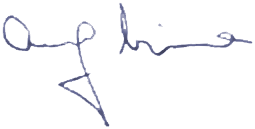
- Signature

Andrej Kiska (Note: Slovak pronunciation: [ˈandrej ˈkiska]) (born 2 February 1963) is a Slovak politician, entrepreneur, writer and philanthropist who served as the fourth president of Slovakia from 2014 to 2019. He ran as an independent candidate in the 2014 presidential election in which he was elected to the presidency in the second round of voting over Prime Minister Robert Fico. Kiska declined to run for a second term in 2019. He has written two books about happiness, success, and his life.

== Early life ==
Kiska was born in Poprad. He studied electrical engineering. His father was an active member of the ruling Communist Party of Slovakia (KSS). He also applied for Communist party membership, but was rejected. Kiska is an ethnic Goral.

== Career ==
Kiska moved to the United States in 1990, one year after the Velvet Revolution. He later founded Triangel and Quatro, two Slovakia-based hire-purchase companies that give the buyer the possibility to pay for goods in several installments over a number of months instead of paying the full price at once.

=== Philanthropy ===
In 2006, Kiska co-founded a non-profit charitable organization called Dobrý anjel (translated as Good Angel), in which donors help families that have found themselves in a difficult financial situation as a result of a family member contracting a serious disease, such as cancer). By 2016, more than 170,000 people have donated to this organization in Slovakia. Good Angel expanded their activities also to Czech Republic in 2014, where 60.000 are paying their monthly contributions in 2016.

=== Tax non-compliance and legal problems ===
Tax authorities accused his co-owned company KTAG (with his brother Jaroslav) of tax non-compliance and under-payments, regarding expenses for his presidential campaign. The company eventually agreed to pay the taxes and a penalty.

Kiska's companies were involved in a number of tax-non compliance issues. Improperly reported income from various business activities resulted in a smaller VAT and Income tax payments. Process against Kiska and his business partner from KTAG s.r.o. Eduard Kučkovský commenced in June 2023 at District Court in Poprad. He was convicted and sentenced to a two-years of suspended imprisonment and a fine of 15,000 euros (about $16,300).

In 2024, the fine was cancelled while the prison term was reduced to one following an appeal. The conviction resulted in the cancellation of his pension by the Slovak presidential office. Andrej Kiska responded that the verdict was the result of threats made by Robert Fico. “Fico threatens inconvenient judges with disciplinary proceedings, and fear has spread among the judiciary. I can’t explain today’s decision of the Regional Court any other way” ... “I will not stop fighting to clear my name until the truth is revealed, and we are filing an appeal with the Supreme Court.”

In his personal tax filing he did not disclose personal propagation before elections performed by his company as a non-cash income, but claimed that he paid for it. Eventually tax office confirmed he did not pay, did not report non-cash income, and his company did not report income from propagation activities but fully deducted all VAT. Remaining costs additionally decreased tax base.

== President of Slovakia (2014–2019) ==
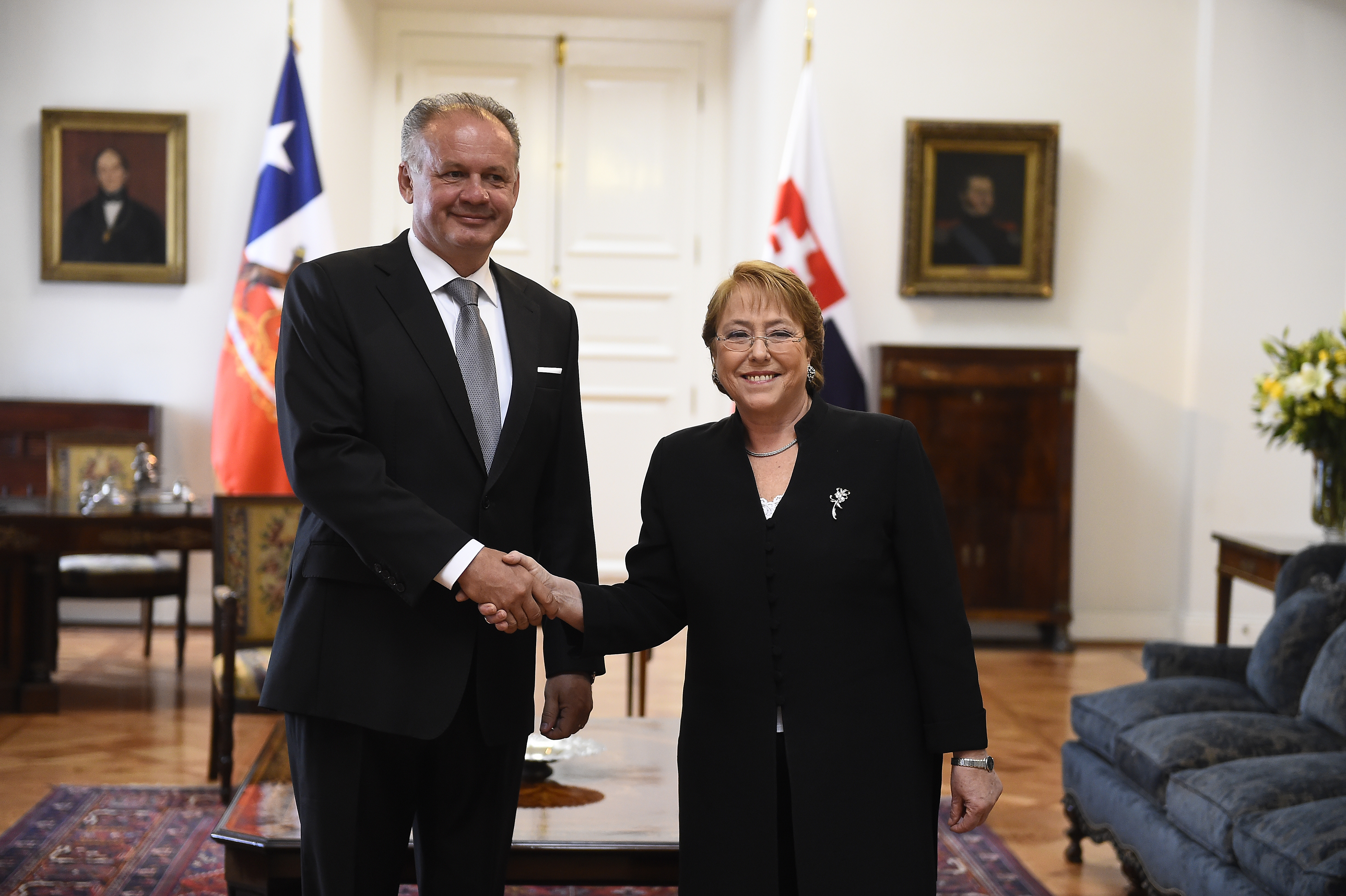
Kiska with President of Chile Michelle Bachelet, Santiago de Chile, 2016

Kiska with President of Latvia Raimonds Vējonis, Riga, December 2018

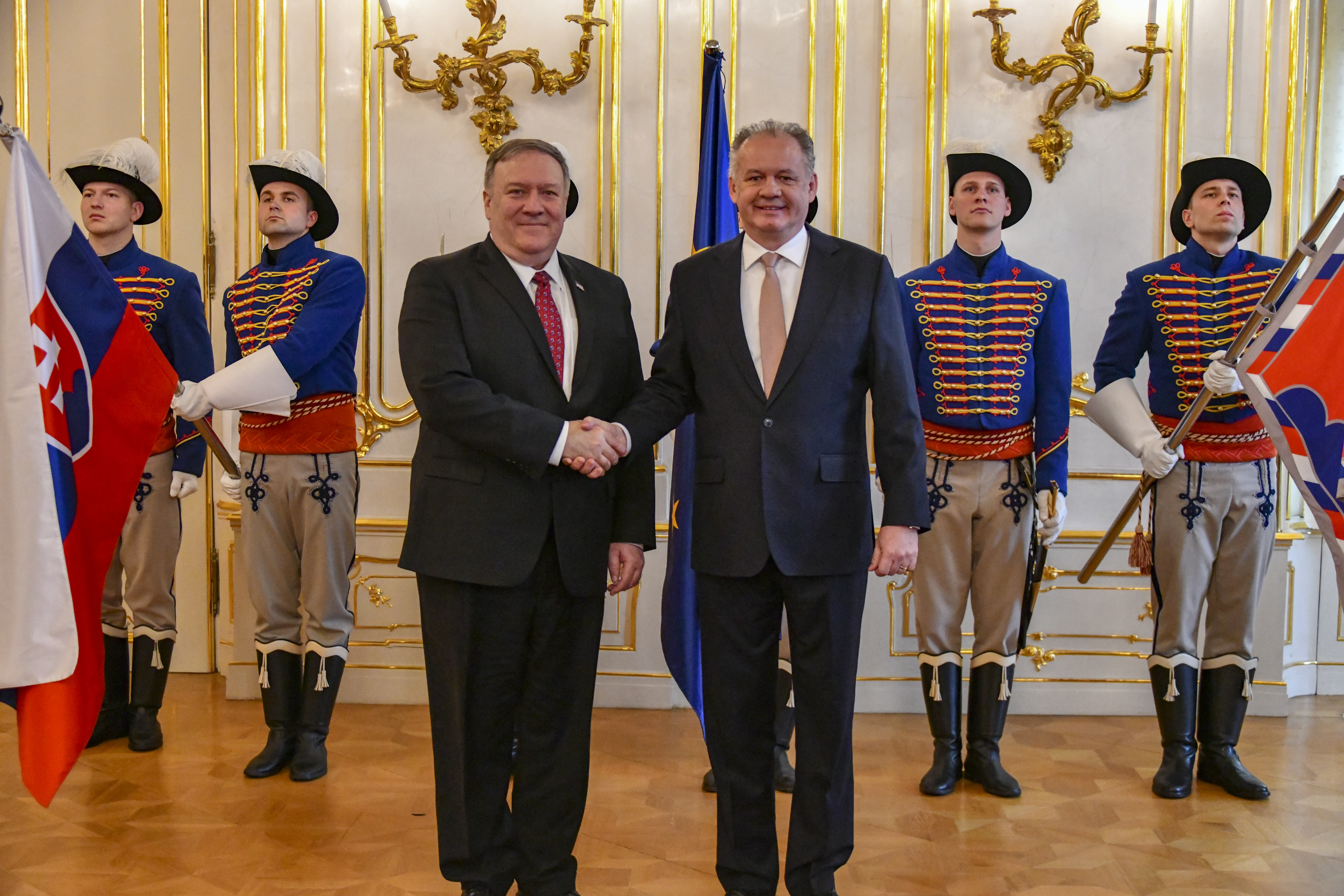
Kiska with U.S. Secretary of State Mike Pompeo in the Grassalkovich Palace, February 2019

In the first round of the 2014 Slovak presidential election, Kiska placed second with 24% of the vote, behind Prime Minister Robert Fico (28%). As none of candidates got more than 50% of votes, Kiska and Fico progressed to a presidential run-off vote on 29 March 2014. With the support of right-wing parties and other defeated candidates, Kiska won decisively in the second round, receiving nearly 60% of the vote. He took office on 15 June.

Kiska announced on 15 May 2018 that he will not participate in 2019 presidential election, arguing that his departure might end "the era of political confrontation" his country faced and citing a desire to spend more time with his family. At the time Kiska made the announcement, polls indicated that he was Slovakia's most trusted politician and that he would have likely been the frontrunner in the election had he chosen to present himself as a candidate.

=== Foreign policy ===
Kiska supports Kosovar independence and is in favour of Slovakia diplomatically recognising Kosovo as an independent sovereign state.

== Post-presidency ==
In 2019, Kiska founded the Za Ľudí party. Despite being a co-favourite candidate for premiership, the party barely entered parliament trespassing the electoral threshold by mere 0.77% of votes in February 2020 election. By August, announced his retirement from active politics citing personal and health reasons.

Kiska has spoken out against Russia over the Russian invasion of Ukraine and supports sanctions against them.

In 2023 Slovak parliamentary election, Kiska endorsed and supported SaS, which ran a group of former Za Ľudí candidates, including former Minister of Justice Mária Kolíková, following an intra-party split with Kiska's successor as ZĽ leader Veronika Remišová.

== Personal life ==
Kiska was married to Mária Kisková, an educator and politician from 1983 until 2001. They had two children, Andrej Kiska (born 1986) and Natália Kisková (born 1991). The couple divorced in 2001 after 18 years of marriage.

In 2003, Kiska married his second wife, Martina Kisková. The couple have three children, a daughter and two sons namely Veronika (born 2004), Viktor (born 2009), and Martin (born July 2017), during his presidency.

== Honours and awards ==
- Slovakia: Order of Andrej Hlinka
- Slovakia: Order of Ľudovít Štúr
- Slovakia: Milan Rastislav Štefánik Cross
- Slovakia: Pribina Cross

=== Foreign honours ===
- Austria: Grand Star of the Decoration of Honour for Services to the Republic of Austria
- Estonia: Collar of the Order of the Cross of Terra Mariana
- Germany: Grand Cross Special Class of the Order of Merit of the Federal Republic of Germany
- Monaco: Grand Cross of the Order of Saint-Charles
- Norway: Grand Cross of the Order of St. Olav
- Romania: Collar of the Order of the Star of Romania
- Poland: Knight of the Order of the White Eagle
- Europe: European Civil Rights Prize of the Sinti and Roma

== Notes ==
Political offices
Preceded by Ivan Gašparovič	President of Slovakia; 2014–2019	Succeeded by Zuzana Čaputová
