= Drug policy of Slovakia =

Drug policy of Slovakia is the legislative framework that governs all aspects of legal drugs and illegal drugs on the territory of Slovakia. It was established with the country's creation on 1 January 1993; the Slovak Republic taking over all commitments of the former Czechoslovakia. Both domestic and international law governs the manufacture, sale, transport and use of most drugs. Alcohol is the most used drug in Slovakia, featuring prominently in the Slovak culture. Slovakia consistently ranks among the top alcohol consuming countries in the world.

The majority of legal drugs are distributed through a dense network of private pharmacies. Non-prescription drugs are free to buy, but the majority of legal drugs are available only through a bureaucratic process. All citizens are required by law to pay health insurance; health insurance companies, in turn, pay doctors who prescribe the drugs. Due to the Act on Drugs and Medical Devices from 2011, Slovakia enjoys the second cheapest prescription drugs in the European Union, as of 2012.

Slovak illegal drug policy is repressive and often described as "harsh", the law does not differentiate between hard soft drugs and sentences can in theory be as severe as life imprisonment. In Slovakia, illegal drug policy documents have no associated budgets and there is no review of executed expenditures. The only available data coming from an estimate from 2006 suggests that the expenditure represented 0.05% of GDP, with 63.3% for public order and safety, 14.8% for treatment, 7.6% for prevention, 1.8% for coordination, 1.3% for education, 0.9% for harm reduction and 10.3% for other areas.

== Legal drug policy of Slovakia ==
Amendments to the August 2011 Act on the Scope of Healthcare Provision and the 1 October 2011 Act on Drugs and Medical Aids introduce an active pharmaceutical ingredient (API) prescription, stipulating that doctors in Slovakia should prescribe only the API instead of a specific drug brand.

== Illegal drug policy of Slovakia ==
The current law defining illegal drugs in Slovakia is Law No. 139/1998 Z.z. "Zákon o omamných látkach, psychotropných látkach a prípravkoch" (Narcotic substances, psychotropic substances and preparations Act) which was codified by the National Council of the Slovak Republic on 2 April 1998.

Amendments:

- Law No. 260/1999 Z.z.
- Law No. 13/2004 Z.z.
- Law No. 455/2007 Z.z.
- Law No. 393/2008 Z.z. (coupled with Military Police Act amendment)
- Law No. 77/2009 Z.z. (coupled with Broadcasting and Re-transmission Act amendment)
- Law No. 468/2009 Z.z.
- Law No. 43/2011 Z.z.

On 11 February 2011, the National Council of the Slovak Republic made the last change to the law by codifying Law No. 43/2011 Z. z. The act was officially described as being "in relation to dangerous substances usage in the so called Crazy-shops (especially mephedrone and synthetic cannabinoids)". The amendment adds 38 psychotropic substances of the I. class, 1 narcotic substance of the II. class, 1 psychotropic substance of the II. class and 3 psychotropic substances of the III. class. It came into effect on 1 March 2011.

Criminalization of illegal drug use, possession and sale is achieved through the Law No. 300/2005 Z.z. "Trestný zákon" (Criminal Law).

Amendments:

- Law No. 497/2008 Z.z.
- Law No. 257/2009 Z.z.
- Law No. 576/2009 Z.z.
- Law No. 224/2010 Z.z.

=== Censorship ===
Section 174 of the Criminal Law called Spreading of toxicomania (Slovak: Šírenie toxikománie) establishes censorship in Slovakia by defining a criminal act of broadcasting the use of any other substance of abuse other than alcohol in favorable light, which when committed publicly, carries a 3 to 8 years prison sentence.

In practice, Slovak journalists tend to avoid the drug problem and routinely practice self-censorship, or cover drug-related topics purely from the criminal point of view. Section 174 of the Criminal Law was used on 17 March 2010 to file a complaint at the police which started investigating the fact, that the new political party Freedom and Solidarity published its intention to decriminalize cannabis in its program statement before the 2010 parliamentary election. The case was finally dismissed on 4 May 2010.

== See also ==
- Economy of Slovakia
- History of Slovakia
- War on drugs
