= Jana Dubovcová =

Slovak lawyer and politician (1952–2026)

Minister of Justice
- In office 15 May 2023 – 25 October 2023
- President: Zuzana Čaputová
- Prime Minister: Ľudovít Ódor
- Preceded by: Viliam Karas
- Succeeded by: Boris Susko

Member of the National Council
- In office 8 July 2010 – 28 March 2012

Former Public Defender of Rights
- In office 28 March 2012 – 28 March 2017
- Preceded by: Pavel Kandráč
- Succeeded by: Mária Patakyová

Personal details
- Born: Jana Verčíková; 2 June 1952 Žilina, Czechoslovakia
- Died: 7 May 2026 (aged 73)
- Party: SDKÚ-DS
- Children: 5
- Education: Comenius University
- Occupation: Lawyer, judge, politician

Jana Dubovcová (22 June 1952 – 7 May 2026) was a Slovak lawyer and politician. From May to October 2023 she served as the Minister of Justice of Slovakia. She was a deputy Member of the National Council from 2010 to 2012.

== Background ==
Jana Dubovcová, née Jana Verčíková, was born on 22 June 1952 in Žilina. She studied law at the Comenius University, graduating in 1977.

During her tenure as a judge she earned recognition from the Transparency International a champion of transparency, who was often critical of her fellow judges. Because of this, she faced accusations of politicizing the courts.

Dubovcová died on 7 May 2026, at the age of 73.

== Political career ==
In 2010 Slovak parliamentary election, she gained an MP seat on the list of Slovak Democratic and Christian Union – Democratic Party. She did not serve the entire term as on 28 March 2012 she was elected ombudsman.

As an ombudsman, Dubovcová became known for defending the rights of the Romani residents of Budulovská near the town of Moldava nad Bodvou, who were brutalized by the police. She also criticized the decrease of social transfers for the poor. For her activities as an ombudsman, she received the Human Rights Defender prize from the U.S. embassy.

In the 2020 Slovak parliamentary election Dubovcová ran on the joint list of Progressive Slovakia and SPOLU, which narrowly failed to pass the parliamentary representation threshold.

On 15 May 2023, president Zuzana Čaputová installed Dubovcová as the Minister of Justice in her technocratic government.
