= Martin Fecko =

Slovak politician

Martin Fecko (born 8 October 1962 in Prešov) is a Slovak politician, currently serving as a Member of the National Council. He has been an MP since 2010 and a State Secretary at the Ministry of Agriculture between March 2020 and July 2021. Fecko was originally a member of the Freedom and Solidarity caucus, since 2012 he has represented the Ordinary People and Independent Personalities party as one of its co-founders.

Fecko studied at the Slovak University of Agriculture, graduating in 1985. Following his graduation, he worked in various positions in the public sector related to agriculture.
