= Štefan Holý =

Slovak politician (born 1978)

Deputy Prime Minister of Slovakia for Legislation and Strategic Planning
- In office 1 July 2020 – 15 May 2023 Serving with Eduard Heger, Richard Sulík, Igor Matovič and Veronika Remišová
- Prime Minister: Igor Matovič; Eduard Heger

Personal details
- Born: 11 December 1978 (age 47) Nová Baňa, Czechoslovakia
- Party: We Are Family
- Education: University of Trnava

Štefan Holý (born 11 December 1978) is a Slovak politician who served as a Deputy Prime Minister of Slovakia from 2020 to 2023. He is in charge of Legislation & Strategic Planning. He is a member of the We Are Family party.
