= Veronika Remišová =

Slovak politician (born 1976)

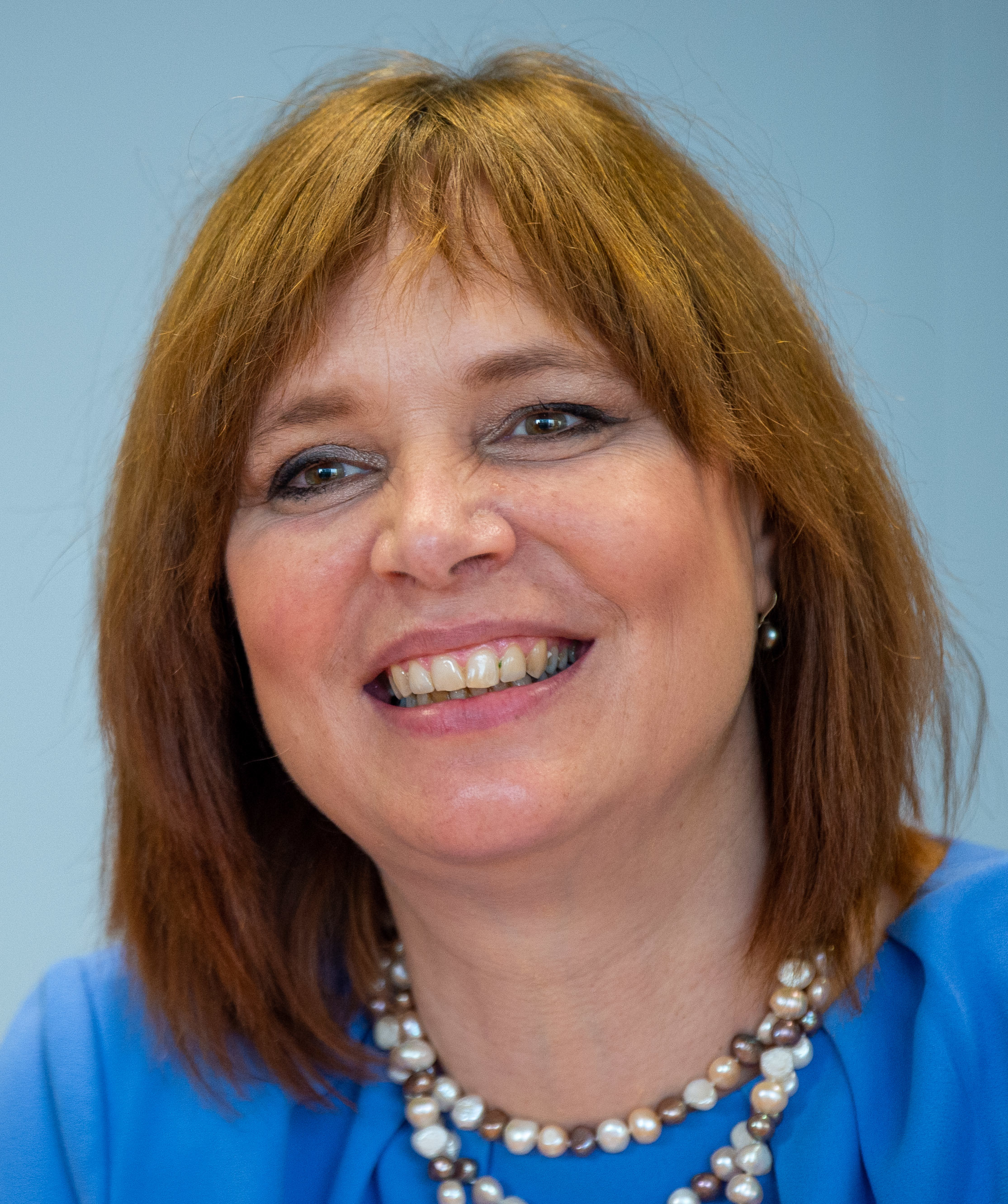
- Remišová in 2021

Deputy Prime Minister of Slovakia
- In office 1 July 2020 – 15 May 2023 Serving with Eduard Heger, Richard Sulík, Igor Matovič and Štefan Holý
- Prime Minister: Igor Matovič; Eduard Heger

Minister of Investments, Regional Development and Informatization
- In office 1 July 2020 – 15 May 2023
- Prime Minister: Igor Matovič; Eduard Heger
- Preceded by: Office established
- Succeeded by: Peter Balík

Deputy Prime Minister of Slovakia for Investment and Informatization
- In office 21 March 2020 – 1 July 2020
- Prime Minister: Igor Matovič
- Preceded by: Richard Raši
- Succeeded by: Office abolished

Member of the National Council
- Incumbent
- Assumed office 15 May 2023
- In office 23 March 2016 – 21 March 2020

Chairwoman of For the People
- Incumbent
- Assumed office 8 August 2020
- Preceded by: Andrej Kiska

Personal details
- Born: Veronika Belošovičová; 31 May 1976 (age 50) Žilina, Czechoslovakia (now Slovakia)
- Party: Ordinary People and Independent Personalities (2016–2019); For the People (2019–present)
- Education: Academy of Performing Arts in Bratislava (Mgr. art.); Sorbonne University (M.A.)

Veronika Remišová (born 31 May 1976) is a Slovak politician who previously served as Deputy Prime Minister of the Slovak Republic and Minister of Investments, Regional Development and Informatization of the Slovak Republic. In 2016, she stood for the National Council as a member of Ordinary People. In 2019, Remišová left the party and joined Andrej Kiska's For the People. In the 2023 parliamentary election she ran and was elected on the ticket of the OĽaNO and Friends as leader of the For the People party to the National Council.

== Early life and education ==
Remišová graduated from Paris 1 Panthéon-Sorbonne University, receiving DEA diploma. She also received a Certificate in Coaching from the University of Cambridge. Remišová worked at the translation department of the European Commission in Luxembourg, managing the European program for youth and education policies.

== Political career ==
In the 2014 Slovak municipal elections, Remišová received 507 votes as a member of OĽaNO. She later became a candidate 2014 European Parliament election, but was not elected to the European Parliament.

In the 2016 Slovak parliamentary election, Remišová was appointed as the leader of the OĽANO candidate. She finished third place after receiving 71,618 preferential votes behind Igor Matovič and Daniel Lipšic.

In the 2020 Slovak parliamentary election, Remišová ran in second place as a For the People candidate, receiving 81,395 votes and maintaining second place in the party. She was perceived as Kiska's successor. After the elections, Remišová stated: "I want the vision that Kiska set to live on, so we will be a modern European center party. There is no such central alternative on the political scene, we are the only such alternative."
