= Branislav Gröhling =

Slovak politician

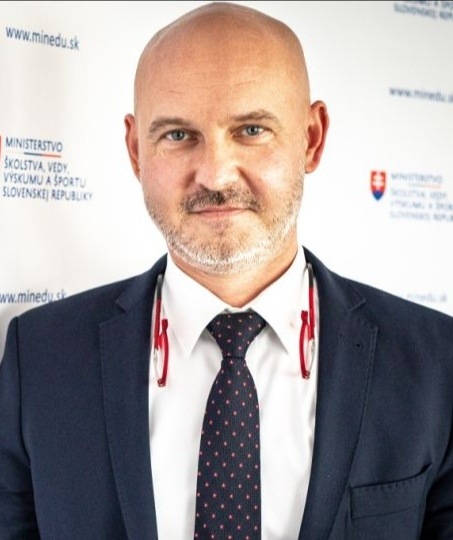

Member of the National Council
- Incumbent
- Assumed office 13 September 2022
- In office 23 March 2016 – 21 March 2020

Minister of Education, Science, Research and Sports
- In office 1 April 2021 – 13 September 2022
- Prime Minister: Eduard Heger
- Preceded by: Eduard Heger (acting)
- Succeeded by: Eduard Heger (acting)
- In office 21 March 2020 – 25 March 2021
- Prime Minister: Igor Matovič
- Preceded by: Martina Lubyová
- Succeeded by: Eduard Heger (acting)

Chairman of Freedom and Solidarity
- Incumbent
- Assumed office 16 March 2024
- Preceded by: Richard Sulík

Personal details
- Born: 7 April 1974 (age 52) Partizánske, Czechoslovakia
- Party: Freedom and Solidarity
- Education: Pan-European University

Branislav Gröhling (born 6 April 1974 in Partizánske) is a Slovak politician who has served as a member of the National Council. Previously, he had served as the Minister of Education, Science, Research and Sports between 2020 and 2022.

== Early life ==
Gröhling trained as a shoemaker in his hometown of Partizánske, but never practiced the trade. Instead, he became a popular hairdresser and stylist, eventually becoming the owner of hairdressing chain in Bratislava called Pierot. While running his business, he faced a shortage of skilled labor, which motivated him to start promoting service trades education, in particular in the beauty and gastronomy industries.

== Political career ==
Gröhling was elected as a member of the National Council in the 2016 Slovak parliamentary election on the Freedom and Solidarity (SaS) party list. After the 2020 Slovak parliamentary election he became the Minister of Education. As a minister, he had to cope with the impact of the COVID-19 pandemic, the influx of children refugees escaping the Russo-Ukrainian War and the efforts to implement curriculum reform and to reform the underperforming education system. He earned praise for being open to dialogue, but also criticism for a lack of specific results. In September 2022, he resigned along with other SaS ministers due to disagreement with politics of Igor Matovič.

At the party congress on 17 March 2024, Gröhling replaced the founding party leader Richard Sulík after 15 years on the helm of Freedom and Solidarity.

== Plagiarism allegations ==
At the age of 35 in 2009, Gröhling graduated from Pan-European University, majoring in law. Nine years later, Denník N reported that Gröhling's final thesis was plagiarized. When the plagiarism scandal of the Speaker of the National Council Boris Kollár broke out, Gröhling had his thesis removed from the Internet. Gröhling refused calls to resign, arguing that his thesis had to be evaluated on the basis on criteria, which were in effect at the Pan-European University at the time when the thesis was defended. He also refused to give up his academic title. In June 2021, Gröhling fired his Deputy Monika Filipová, who had previously criticized him for his conduct with connection of the plagiarized final theses. Filipová blamed the firing on retribution by Gröhling for the criticism.
