= Slovakia Movement =

Political party in Slovakia

Slovakia Movement Hnutie Slovensko
- Chairman: Igor Matovič
- General Secretary: Július Jakab
- Parliamentary caucus leader: Michal Šipoš
- Founder: Igor Matovič
- Founded: 28 October 2011
- Split from: Freedom and Solidarity
- Headquarters: Zámocká 6873/14, 81101 Bratislava
- Membership (2022): ▲61
- Ideology: Populism; National conservatism
- Political position: Centre to centre-right
- National affiliation: OĽaNO and Friends (since 2023)
- European affiliation: European People's Party
- European Parliament group: European People's Party Group
- Colours: Blue-green; Red
- Slogan: We will not sell you to the mafia (2023)
- National Council: 10 / 150
- European Parliament: 0 / 15
- Regional governors: 1 / 8
- Regional deputies: 21 / 416
- Mayors (Note: Also with coalitions): 54 / 2,904
- Local councillors (Note: Also with coalitions): 752 / 20,686

Website
- obycajniludia.sk

Slovakia Movement (Slovak: Hnutie Slovensko), known as Ordinary People and Independent Personalities (OĽaNO, Slovak: Obyčajní ľudia a nezávislé osobnosti) (Note: Full legal name since May 2023: OĽaNO and Friends: Ordinary People, Independent Candidates, NOVA, Free and Responsible, Respectful Romani, Hungarian Hearts (Slovak: OĽaNO a priatelia: Obyčajní ľudia, Nezávislí kandidáti, NOVA, Slobodní a zodpovední, Pačivale Roma, Magyar Szívek)) until 25 October 2023, is a populist political party in Slovakia. Founded in 2011 by former businessman Igor Matovič, the party campaigns on anti-corruption, anti-elitist, and anti-establishment sentiments, as well as direct democracy. While widely regarded as lacking a coherent ideology, the party often employs conservative rhetoric. It is recognized as a business-firm party.

A minor opposition party in the National Council from 2012 to 2020, it achieved an upset victory in the 2020 election with 25% of the vote and subsequently formed a coalition government. In the 2023 election, following the collapse of its government, its support fell by two thirds, and it returned to opposition.

It is affiliated with the European People's Party and its European Parliament group.

== History ==
=== Opposition (2012–2020) ===
The initial four Ordinary People MPs were Igor Matovič, Erika Jurinová, Martin Fecko, Jozef Viskupič. They sat in the National Council with Freedom and Solidarity (SaS), and signed an agreement with SaS that its members could not cross the floor to another group. In June and July 2010, it was rumoured that they would refuse to back the programme of the new centre-right coalition, which included Freedom and Solidarity, and whose majority depended on Ordinary People.

In August 2010, Matovič said that it was not the right time to become an independent party. However, on 28 October 2011, Matovič filed a formal application for party registration under the name Ordinary People and Independent Personalities (OĽaNO). In the 2012 parliamentary election, the party integrated Civic Conservative Party and Conservative Democrats of Slovakia members within its list. However, both Civic Conservative Party and Conservative Democrats of Slovakia withdrew from the list prior to the election due to a dispute with OĽaNO. In the election, the party came in third place overall, winning 8.55% of the vote and 16 seats.

In the 2014 European elections, OĽaNO came in fourth place nationally, receiving 7.46% of the vote and electing 1 MEP.

In 2016, the party legally changed its name to Ordinary People and Independent Personalities–NOVA before the election in order to integrate NOVA and Change from Below members within its list. In the 2016 parliamentary election, it received 11.02% votes in Slovakia and consequently 19 MPs in the Slovak Parliament.

In 2014–2019, the party was member of European Parliament group of European Conservatives and Reformists and in 2019 switched to the European People's Party group.

In 2020, the party legally changed its name to Ordinary People and Independent Personalities–NOVA–Christian Union–Change from Below before the election in order to integrate NOVA, Christian Union and Change from Below members within its list. In the 2020 parliamentary election, it received 25.0% of the vote, winning a 53 of 150 seats in the National Council. Party leader Igor Matovič was appointed as the Prime Minister designate.

=== Government (2020–2023) ===
As Prime Minister (2020–2021), Igor Matovič's leadership was marked by a combative and chaotic style, leading to tensions within the coalition and his eventual resignation amid a government crisis. Though he stepped down as Prime Minister, he remained the leader of OĽaNO, with Eduard Heger—previously serving as Finance Minister and Deputy Prime Minister under Matovič—succeeding him as Prime Minister (2021–2023). Heger was praised for his diplomatic approach, which facilitated more constructive governance, but his premiership was widely seen as weak and largely nominal, as his authority was undermined by Igor Matovič and Boris Kollár, the chairman of We Are Family and Speaker of the National Council, ultimately leading to his government's collapse.

A study by political scientist Pavol Baboš, Slovakia: Anti-Pandemic Fight Victim of Politicization, highlights how the OĽaNO-led government's response to the COVID-19 pandemic was marked by explicit populism in both politics and rhetoric. It describes how Prime Minister Igor Matovič created a parallel structure outside the country's established legislative framework for crisis management, which some viewed as unconstitutional. The study also notes that while the government faced significant instability and internal conflicts, its stance on European integration and Euro-Atlantic cooperation improved during this period.

The government prioritized anti-corruption efforts, including the arrest of several high-profile figures accused of corruption from previous administrations. These actions were framed as part of a broader campaign to restore public trust in state institutions. However, critics raised concerns about the politicization of these efforts and the potential undermining of judicial independence. The administration's commitment to systemic reform was often questioned due to inconsistencies in implementation and a perceived lack of long-term strategy.

=== Opposition (2023–present) ===
On 25 October 2023, the party changed its name to Slovakia.

== Ideology and platform ==
Described as a valence populist party, it eventually adopted a generally conservative outlook while maintaining its anti-corruption and anti-elitist rhetoric. Party leader Igor Matovič endorsed the 2015 referendum initiated by Alliance for Family, voting against the introduction of same-sex marriages, adoptions and compulsory sex education in state schools. Before the 2020 parliamentary election, Matovič announced that his party would not join a coalition government that wanted to establish civil unions or loosen drug policy.

Frequently identified as a business-firm party, OĽaNO lacks any internal democratic structures, and Matovič decides on the composition of the electoral list, admission of members and political nominations. The use of public subsidies for the party is considered non-transparent and similar to a private company rather than a political entity. OĽaNO claimed to have 50 members as of 31 December 2021.

== Election results ==
=== National Council ===
==== Ordinary People and Independent Personalities ====
Election	Leader	Votes	%	Rank	Seats	+/–	Status
2012	Igor Matovič	218,537	8.6%	3rd	16 / 150		Opposition

==== Ordinary People and Independent Personalities–NOVA ====
Election	Leader	Votes	%	Rank	Seats	+/–	Status
2016	Igor Matovič	287,611	11.0%	3rd	19 / 150	▲3	Opposition

==== Ordinary People and Independent Personalities–NOVA–Christian Union–Change from Below ====
Election	Leader	Votes	%	Rank	Seats	+/–	Status
2020	Igor Matovič	721,166	25.0%	1st	53 / 150	▲34	OĽaNO–NOVA–KÚ–ZZ–We Are Family–SaS–For the People (2020–2022)
2020	Igor Matovič	721,166	25.0%	1st	53 / 150	▲34	OĽaNO–NOVA–KÚ–ZZ–We Are Family–For the People (2022–2023)
2020	Igor Matovič	721,166	25.0%	1st	53 / 150	▲34	Opposition (2023)

==== OĽaNO and Friends: Ordinary People, Independent Candidates, NOVA, Free and Responsible, Respectful Romani, Hungarian Hearts ====
Election	Leader	Votes	%	Rank	Seats	+/–	Status
2023	Igor Matovič	OĽaNO–NEKA–NOVA–Free and Responsible–Respectful Romani–Hungarian Hearts–KÚ–For the People			13 / 150	▼40	Opposition

=== European Parliament ===
Election	List leader	Votes	%	Rank	Seats	+/–	EP Group
2014	Jozef Viskupič	41,829	7.5%	4th	1 / 13		ECR
2019	Michal Šipoš	51,834	5.3%	6th	1 / 14	0	EPP
2024 (Note: Run in a joint list with ZĽ and NOVA.)	Peter Pollák	29,385	2.0%	9th	0 / 15	▼1	–

=== Presidential ===
Election	Candidate	First round			Second round		
Election	Candidate	Votes	%	Rank	Votes	%	Rank
2014	Helena Mezenská	45,180	2.4%	7th			
2014	Endorsed Andrej Kiska				1,307,065	59.4%	1st
2019	Endorsed; Zuzana Čaputová	870,415	40.6%	1st	1,056,582	58.4%	1st
2024	Igor Matovič	49,201	2.2%	5th			
2024	Endorsed; Patrik Dubovský	16,107	0.7%	7th			
2024	Endorsed Ivan Korčok				1,243,709	46.9%	2nd
