= For the People (Slovakia) =

Centrist political party in Slovakia

For the People Za ľudí
- Abbreviation: ZĽ
- Leader: Veronika Remišová
- Presidium: Miriam Šuteková; Viera Leščáková
- Parliamentary leader: Miriam Šuteková
- Founder: Andrej Kiska
- Founded: 2 September 2019
- Headquarters: Bratislava
- Youth wing: Mladí Za ľudí (2019-2021)
- Membership (2022): ▼284
- Ideology: Liberal conservatism; Pro-Europeanism
- Political position: Centre to centre-right
- National affiliation: OĽaNO and Friends (since 2023)
- European affiliation: European People's Party
- Colours: Yellow Blue
- Slogan: Courageously and responsibly
- National Council: 1 / 150
- European Parliament: 0 / 15
- Regional governors: 0 / 8
- Regional deputies: 39 / 419
- Mayors: 6 / 2,904
- Local councillors: 111 / 20,462

Party flag

Website
- stranazaludi.sk

For the People (Slovak: Za ľudí) is a centre to centre-right, liberal-conservative political party in Slovakia. It was founded by former President Andrej Kiska in 2019. Kiska became the party's leader at the founding convention on 28 September 2019. Deputy Prime Minister and Investments, Regional Development and Informatisation Minister Veronika Remišová became the new chair of the party on 8 August 2020, having been elected by delegates at the party congress held in Trenčianske Teplice, defeating her rival candidate, MP and Hlohovec mayor Miroslav Kollár.

== Election results ==
=== National Council ===
Election	Leader	Votes	%	Rank	Seats	+/–	Status
2016	Andrej Kiska	did not exist (Note: Veronika Remišová switched from OĽaNO to ZĽ)			1 / 150	New	Opposition
2020	Andrej Kiska	166,325	5.8	7th	12 / 150	▲11	Coalition
2023	Igor Matovič (Note: Igor Matovič (OĽaNO) served as list leader and Veronika Remišová served as ZĽ's chairman.)	264,137	8.9	4th	1 / 150	▼10	Opposition
2023	Igor Matovič	Running in coalition with the OĽaNO, KÚ and NOVA, which won 16 seats in total.					

=== European Parliament ===
Election	List leader	Votes	%	Rank	Seats	+/–	EP Group
2024 (Note: Run in a joint list with Slovakia and NOVA.)	Peter Pollák	29,385	2.0	9th	0 / 15	New	–

== History of leaders ==
	Image	Name	Entered office	Left office	Length of Leadership
1		Andrej Kiska	2 September 2019	8 August 2020	11 months and 6 days
2		Veronika Remišová	8 August 2020	present	5 years, 11 months and 23 days

== See also ==
- Category:For the People (Slovakia) politicians
- Politics of Slovakia
- List of political parties in Slovakia
