= Eduard Heger =

10th Prime Minister of Slovakia

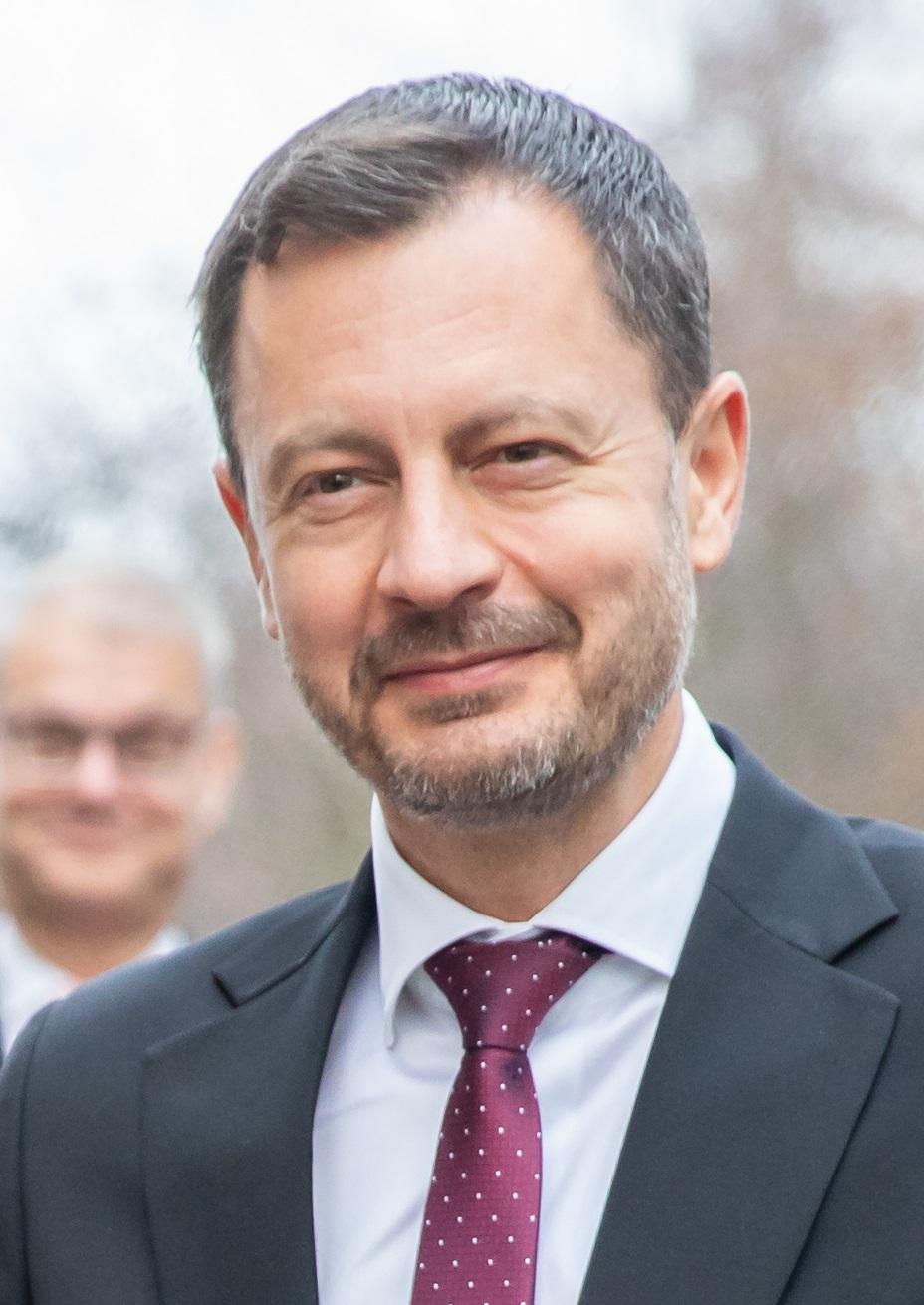
- Heger in 2022

Prime Minister of Slovakia
- In office 1 April 2021 – 15 May 2023
- President: Zuzana Čaputová
- Deputy: See list: Štefan Holý; Veronika Remišová; Igor Matovič; Richard Sulík
- Preceded by: Igor Matovič
- Succeeded by: Ľudovít Ódor

Deputy Prime Minister of Slovakia
- In office 21 March 2020 – 1 April 2021 Serving with Štefan Holý, Veronika Remišová and Richard Sulík
- Prime Minister: Igor Matovič
Other positions in the executive
Minister of Health
Acting; 3 March 2023 – 15 May 2023
Prime Minister	Himself
Preceded by	Vladimír Lengvarský
Succeeded by	Michal Palkovič
Acting; 12 March 2021 – 1 April 2021
Prime Minister	Igor Matovič
Preceded by	Marek Krajčí
Succeeded by	Vladimír Lengvarský
Minister of Finance
Acting; 23 December 2022 – 15 May 2023
Prime Minister	Himself
Preceded by	Igor Matovič
Succeeded by	Michal Horváth
In office 21 March 2020 – 1 April 2021
Prime Minister	Igor Matovič
Preceded by	Ladislav Kamenický
Succeeded by	Igor Matovič
Minister of Education, Science, Research and Sport
Acting; 13 September 2022 – 4 October 2022
Prime Minister	Himself
Preceded by	Branislav Gröhling
Succeeded by	Ján Horecký
Acting; 25 March 2021 – 1 April 2021
Prime Minister	Igor Matovič
Preceded by	Branislav Gröhling
Succeeded by	Branislav Gröhling

Member of the National Council
- In office 15 May 2023 – 25 October 2023
- In office 23 March 2016 – 21 March 2020

Chairman of Democrats
- In office 7 March 2023 – 2 December 2023
- Preceded by: Miroslav Kollár
- Succeeded by: Jaroslav Naď

Personal details
- Born: 3 May 1976 (age 50) Bratislava, Czechoslovakia (now Slovakia)
- Party: Democrats (since 2023)
- Other political affiliations: Ordinary People and Independent Personalities (until 2023)
- Spouse: Lucia Hegerová (m. 2005)
- Children: 4
- Education: University of Economics in Bratislava (Ing.)

Eduard Heger (Note: Slovak pronunciation: [ˈeduard ˈɦeɡer]) (born 3 May 1976) is a Slovak politician, who served as the Prime Minister of Slovakia from 1 April 2021 to 15 May 2023. He previously served as the Deputy Prime Minister and Minister of Finance in the cabinet of Igor Matovič. Heger was a member of the presidium of the Ordinary People and Independent Personalities (OĽaNO) party which he left in March 2023 to take over the extra-parliamentary Blue Coalition party, subsequently rebranded as Democrats.

== Early life ==
Heger was born in 1976 in Bratislava to parents employed in culture. His father, a member of the Communist party, organized big music festivals, which allowed young Heger to meet many local high profile musicians. His family was not religious, but Heger embraced Catholic charismatic renewal as a young adult after the death of his father. Prior to his entry to politics, he was professionally involved in management of the Charismatic Christian communities in Slovakia. In particular, he was active in the community under the administration of the Cathedral of St. Martin in Bratislava.

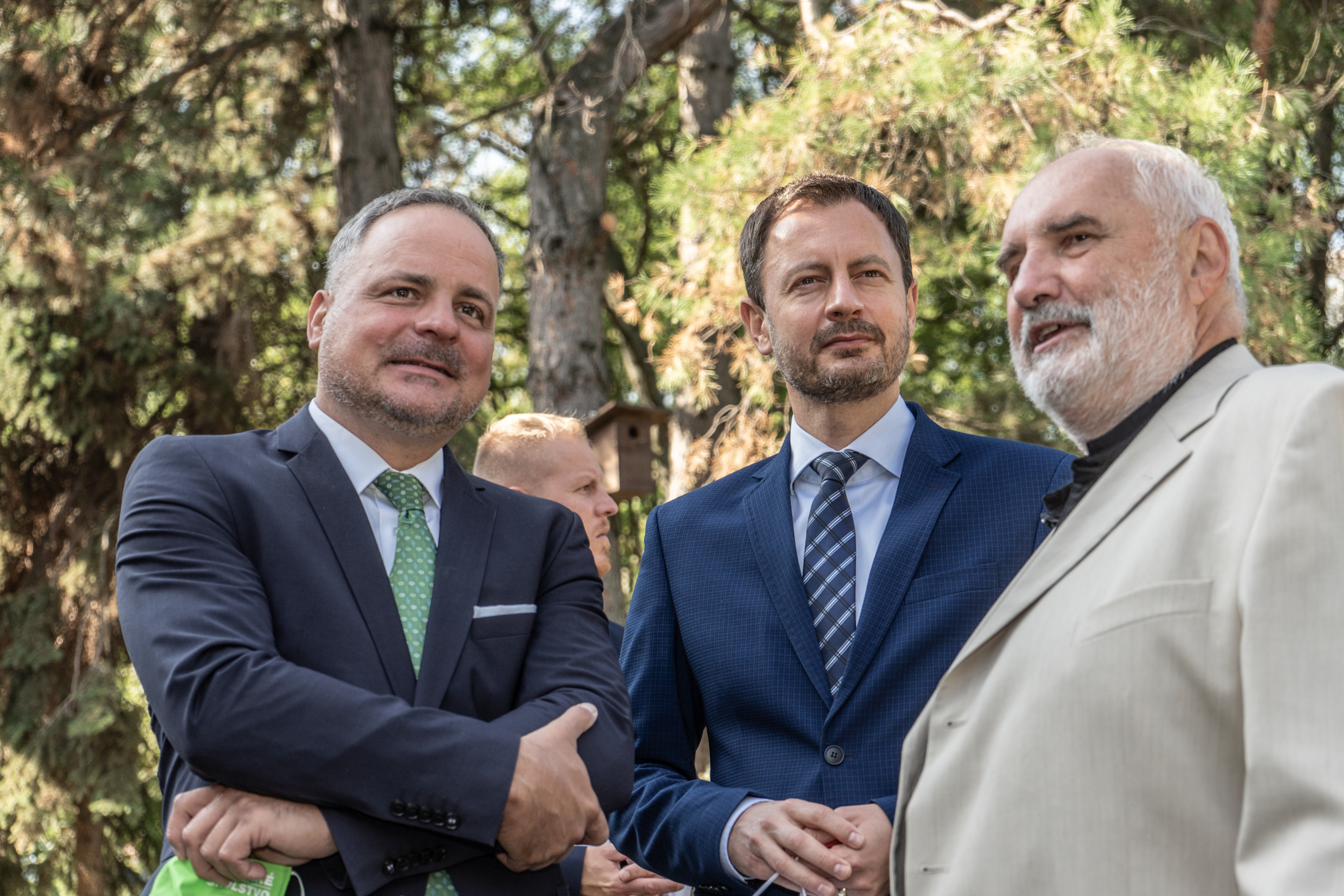
Eduard Heger and Juraj Droba opening a school in the Bratislava region

In 1999, Heger graduated in Trade and Management at the University of Economics in Bratislava. He held junior managerial positions at several small companies earlier, including several restaurants and bathroom accessory producer Intercomp. Between 2001 and 2005, Heger worked as a junior consultant for Cubic Corporation on a military modernization project for the Slovak Ministry of Defence. He also spent about 18 months in the United States and became acquainted with Juraj Droba, who later went on to become the Governor of the Bratislava Region a prominent liberal politician in Slovakia. Despite being a conservative, Heger formed a strong friendship with Droba. Together with American investors, they established a company called Old Nassau, the producer of Double Cross Vodka, a premium Slovak vodka brand destined mainly for export to the US. At Old Nassau, Heger was responsible for production and marketing until his entry to politics.

In 2016, Heger was persuaded to run for an MP seat by prominent figures of the Slovak Charismatic movement Branislav Škripek and Richard Vašečka, who were themselves active in politics.

== Political career ==
=== Opposition MP, 2016–2020 ===
In the 2016 parliamentary election, Heger gained a seat in the National Council of the Slovak Republic for the populist party Ordinary People and Independent Personalities (OĽaNO). Although his 24th place on electoral list of his party would otherwise not suffice for a seat, he became an MP due to over 15,000 personal votes he received under the Slovakia's optional preferential voting system. As an MP, he got appointed the chairman of the OĽaNO parliamentary group, the chairman of the National Council Committee for Control of Military Intelligence and a member of the Economic and Foreign Affairs committees.

During his term as an opposition MP, he was evaluated as the 2nd most active member of the National Council. He presented 173 bills and spoke 680 times in Parliament. He was OĽaNO's shadow Minister of Finance and drafted the party's "Program for Sound Public Finances" of his party and presented a set of measures to combat bureaucracy. He participated in and organised several anti-corruption and anti-government protests. During the election term, he was a co-organiser of the Zastavme Hazard (Stop Gambling) initiative, which fought to ban gambling.

In the 2020 Slovak parliamentary election, Heger ran from the 142nd place on the OĽaNO list in line with the tradition of the populist party, where popular politicians run from the bottom positions on the list that do not guarantee them an automatic MP seat. He was once again elected by preferential votes, having received nearly 63,000 personal votes.

=== In government ===
==== Minister of Finance, 2020–2021 ====
After the 2020 OĽaNO electoral victory, Heger forfeit his parliamentary seat to join the government, which is not compatible with the position of an MP in the Slovak constitutional system. In the cabinet of Prime Minister Igor Matovič he served as Minister of Finance and deputy PM. During his short tenure he had to deal with a major fiscal shock of the global COVID-19 pandemic. The most important tasks with respect to the pandemic were ensuring Slovakia's ability to finance its spending needs and overseeing preparation of the national Recovery and Resilience Plan to access the Next Generation EU funding from the European Union. On 1 April 2021, a government reshuffle in response to the demands of OĽaNO's junior coalition partners Freedom and Solidarity and For the People parties who refused to support a government with Igor Matovič as a PM any longer took place. As a result, Heger became the Prime Minister and the previous PM Matovič took over the Ministry of Finance.

==== Prime Minister (2021–2023) ====
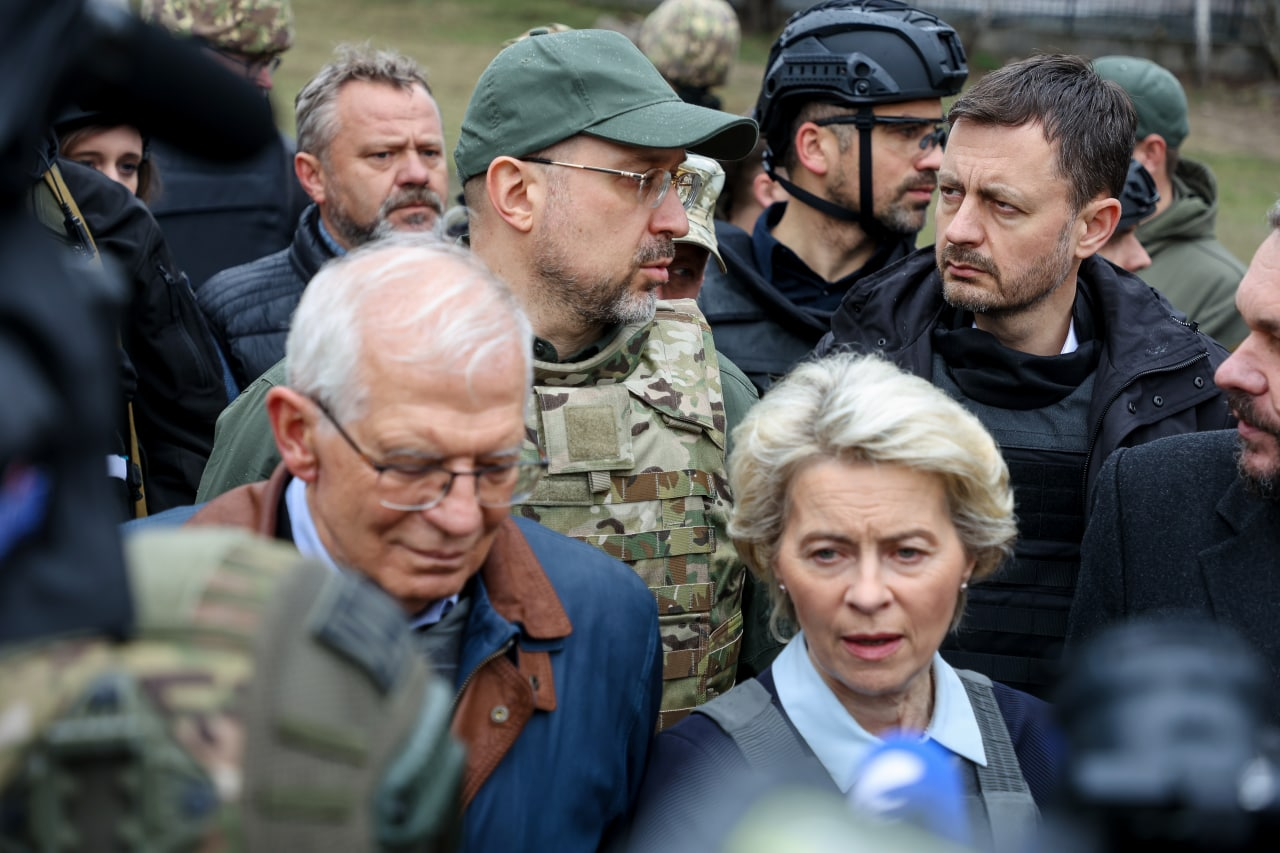
Denys Shmyhal, EU officials and Eduard Heger visit Bucha after the massacre

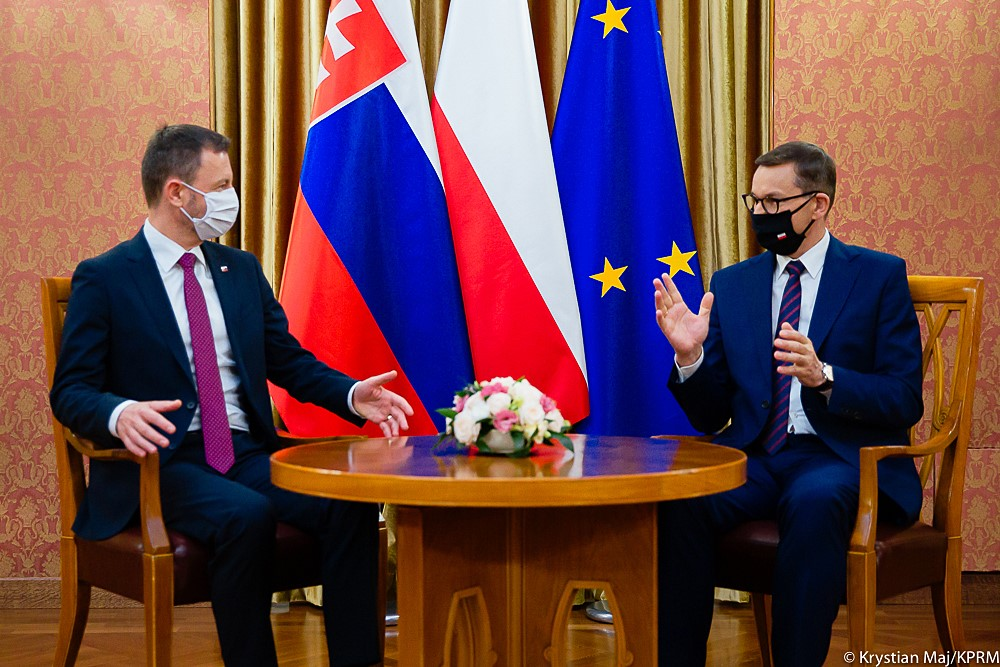
Polish Prime Minister Mateusz Morawiecki and Eduard Heger in Warsaw

As prime minister, Heger has won praise from his coalition partners for his diplomatic skills, which facilitated more constructive functioning of the government in comparison to the combative style to his predecessor Matovič. At the same time, critics stress the lack of autonomy of Heger in relation to Matovič, who remained the chairman of OĽaNO. After the successful motion of no confidence ended Heger's cabinet, political scientists Dana Malová and Juraj Marušiak assessed his entire premiership as weak and largely nominal, citing his authority being undermined by Matovič, and Boris Kollár, Speaker of the National Council and leader of the coalition partner We Are Family.

On the international stage, Heger has gained notability for his strong support for Ukraine in the Russian invasion of Ukraine, which manifested in several rounds of Slovak arms deliveries for Ukraine, support for Ukrainian membership in the European Union and a personal visit of Kyiv and surrounding areas devastated by the Russian army in April 2022 along with the European Commission President Ursula von der Leyen and EU's chief diplomat Josep Borrell. His government was ousted in a motion of no confidence on 15 December. On 16 December President Čaputová formally dismissed Heger's government, per the Constitution of Slovakia, Heger continued to serve as prime minister until a successor was appointed.

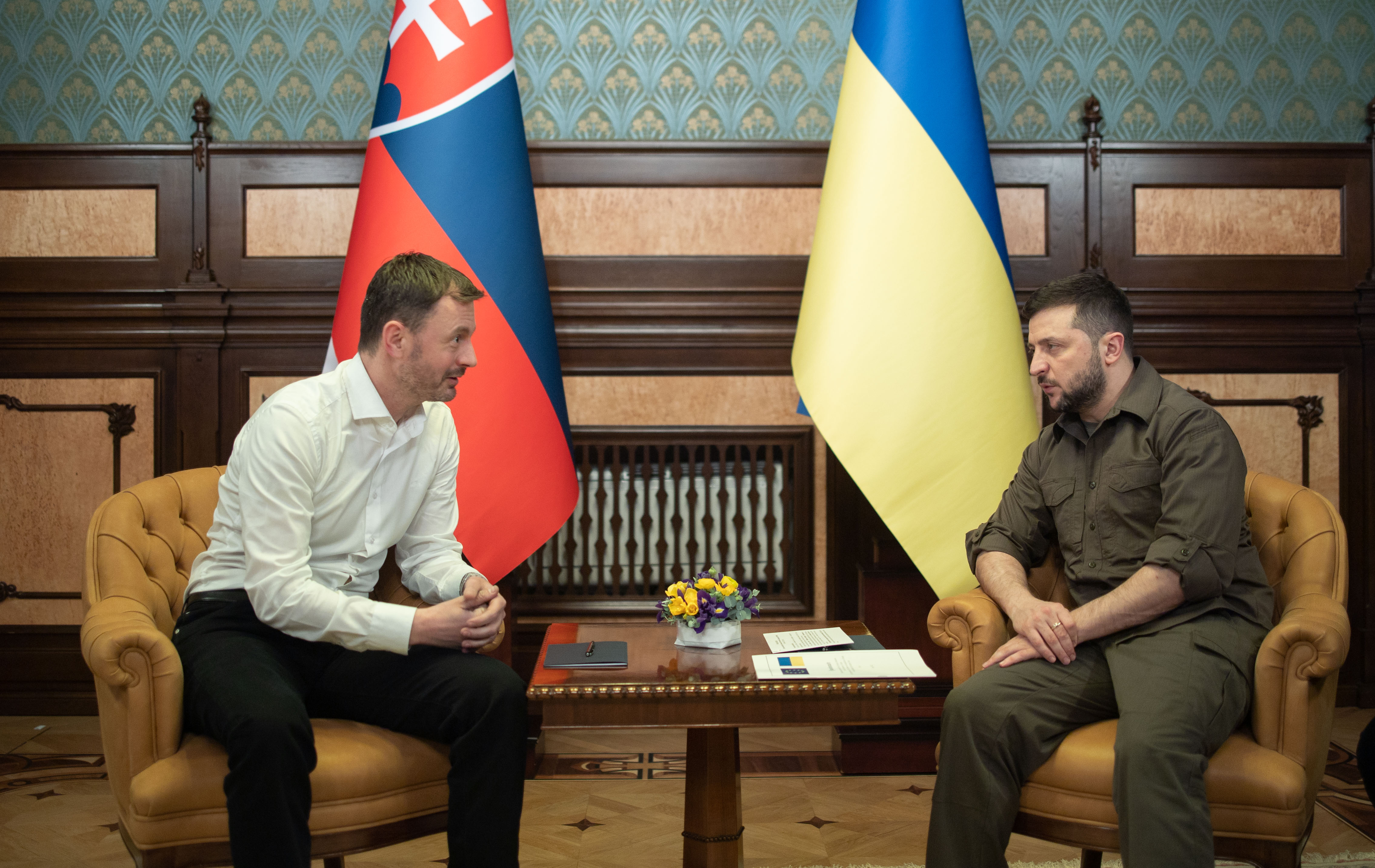
Ukrainian President Volodymyr Zelenskyy and Eduard Heger in Kyiv

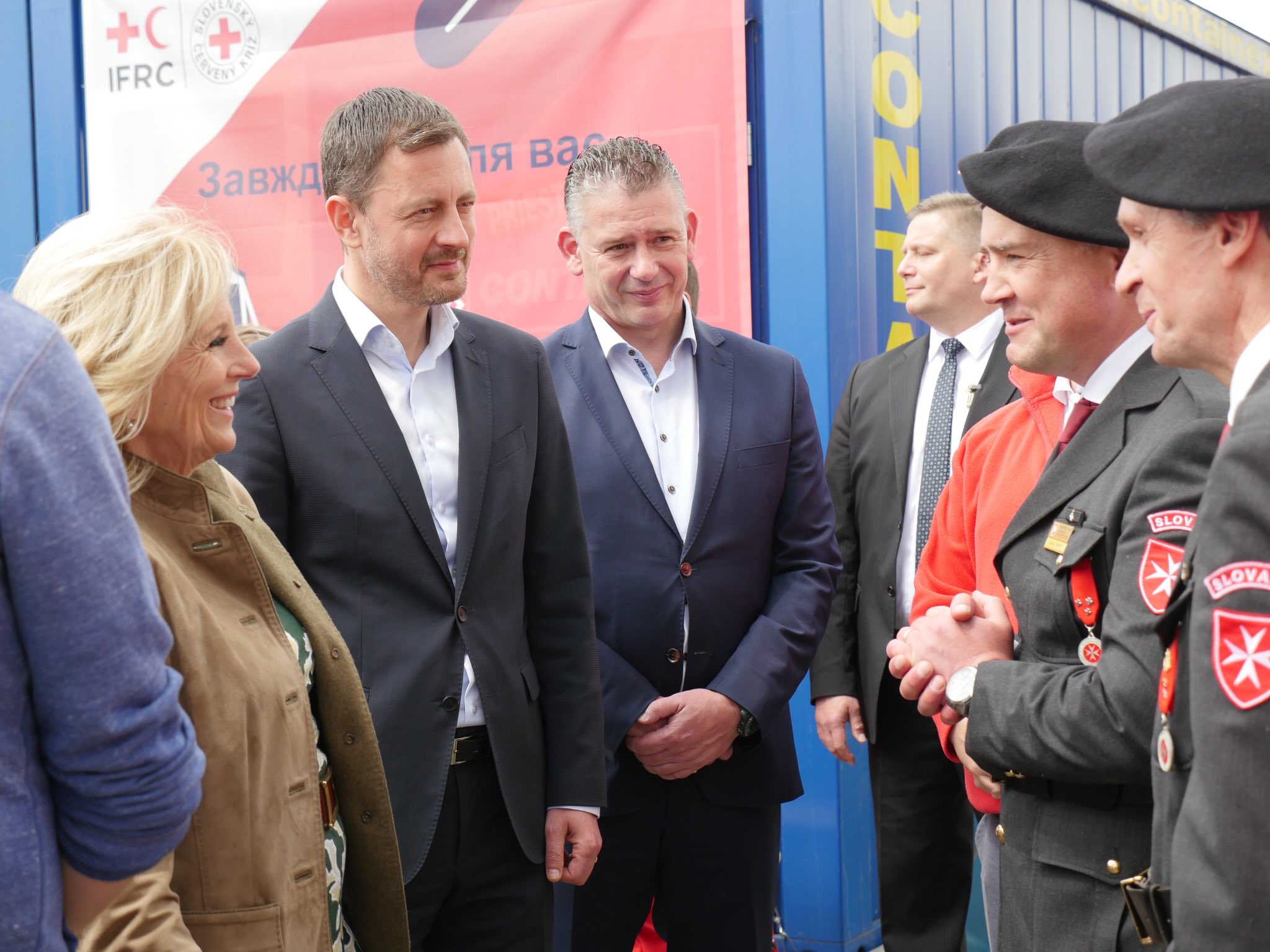
Jill Biden and Eduard Heger meeting staff members of NGOs helping Ukrainian refugees at Vyšné Nemecké border crossing

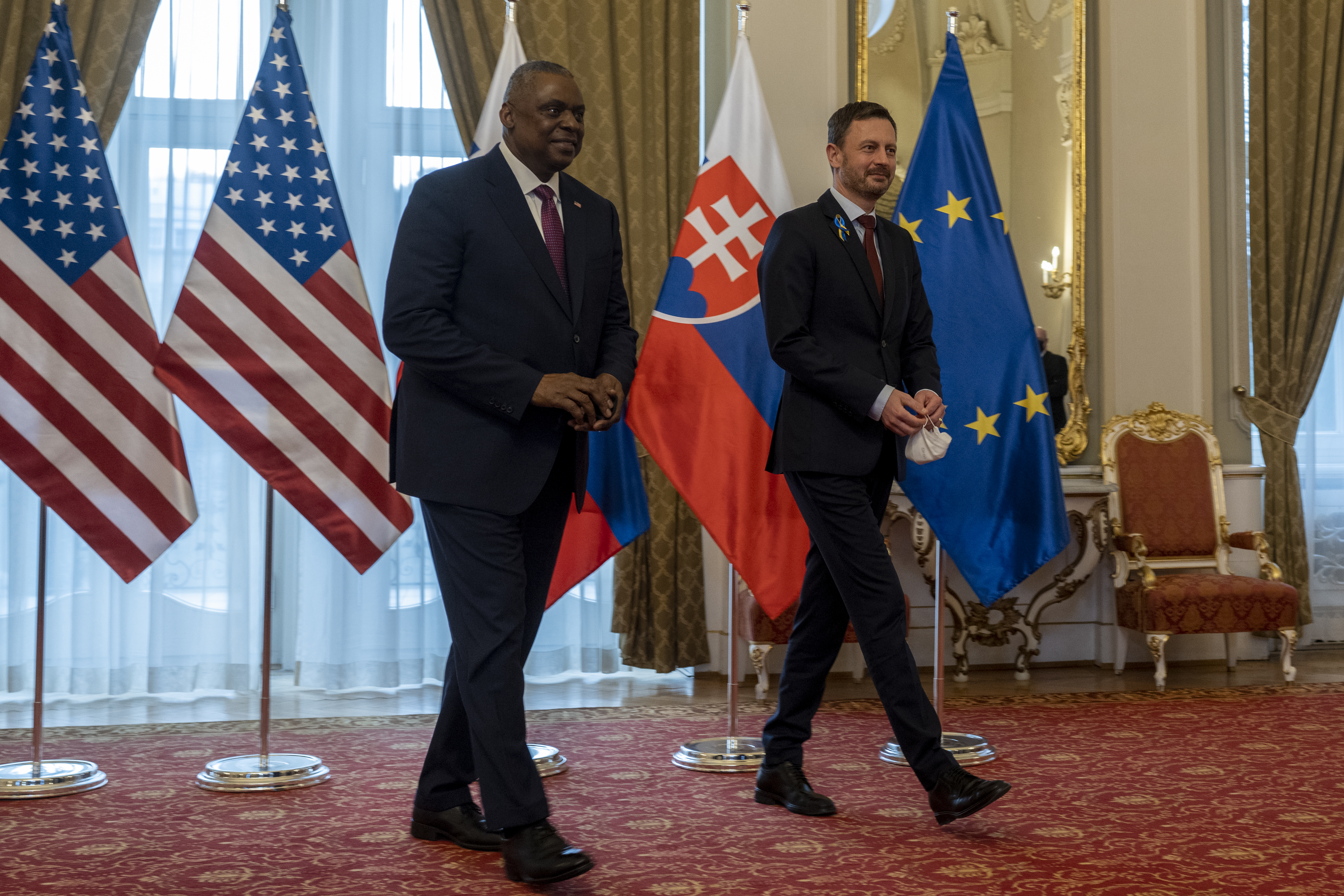
U.S. Secretary of Defense Lloyd J. Austin is welcomed by Eduard Heger in Bratislava

On 7 March 2023, Heger announced his departure from OĽaNO to take over the extra-parliamentary Blue Coalition party, subsequently rebranded as Democrats.

On 7 May 2023, Heger announced his resignation as prime minister after several ministers had resigned a few days prior.

== Political views ==
=== Economic policy ===
As a Minister of Finance, Heger supported a shift of tax burden from direct to property taxation. His plans were met with a strong backlash on social media, where claims that a massive hike of real estate tax was imminent mushroomed. Heger called these claims a "hoax" and stated his reform will not increase the overall tax burden but rather provide incentives for families and businesses to work and invest by decreasing the income tax. The reform was never implemented, likely due to short-lasting tenure of Heger as the Minister of Finance.

=== Foreign policy ===
Heger is a staunch supporter of Ukraine in its defense against the Russian invasion. Slovakia provided major arms deliveries, including its sole S-300 missile system to Ukraine and Heger personally lobbied EU leaders for Ukrainian membership in the EU. At the World Economic Forum in Davos, Heger explained that his support for Ukraine is due to his belief that if Ukraine was allowed to fall, Slovakia would be next in line to be invaded by Russia. In February 2023, Heger expressed that he would be willing to send Slovak professional combat troops to fight in Ukraine as part of Slovakia's alliance commitments.

=== Social policy ===
During his tenure, Slovakia took a neutral stance on the controversial Hungarian law targeting the LGBT people, which classifies the promotion of homosexuality, including information or advertisements about the LGBT people, as illegal. Seventeen EU member states condemned this Hungarian law as discriminatory, but Heger did not condemn it. Following a hate-driven terrorist attack against the LGBT people on Zámocká Street in Bratislava, he initially referred to the attack as related to a 'lifestyle.' In response to journalists' question about the equality of LGBT people in Slovakia, he stated that they are not equal in practice, before quickly shifting the focus to Christians, whom he claimed also face hatred and contempt. He later apologized for his statements and participated in the March Against Hate targeting the LGBT people.

Heger is staunchly anti-abortion stating that the human life begins at conception. Nonetheless, he rejects the "polarizing" debate around abortion in Slovakia.

== Personal life ==
Heger and his wife Lucia have four children. He is a devout Charismatic Catholic and in his free time he worked in several functions in the Catholic Church of Slovakia.

== Awards and honors ==
- Order of Merit, 1st class (Ukraine, 23 August 2021)

== Notes ==
Political offices
Preceded by Ladislav Kamenický	Minister of Finance; 2020–2021	Succeeded by Igor Matovič
Preceded by Igor Matovič	Prime Minister of Slovakia; 2021–2023	Succeeded by Ľudovít Ódor
