= Igor Matovič =

7th Prime Minister of Slovakia

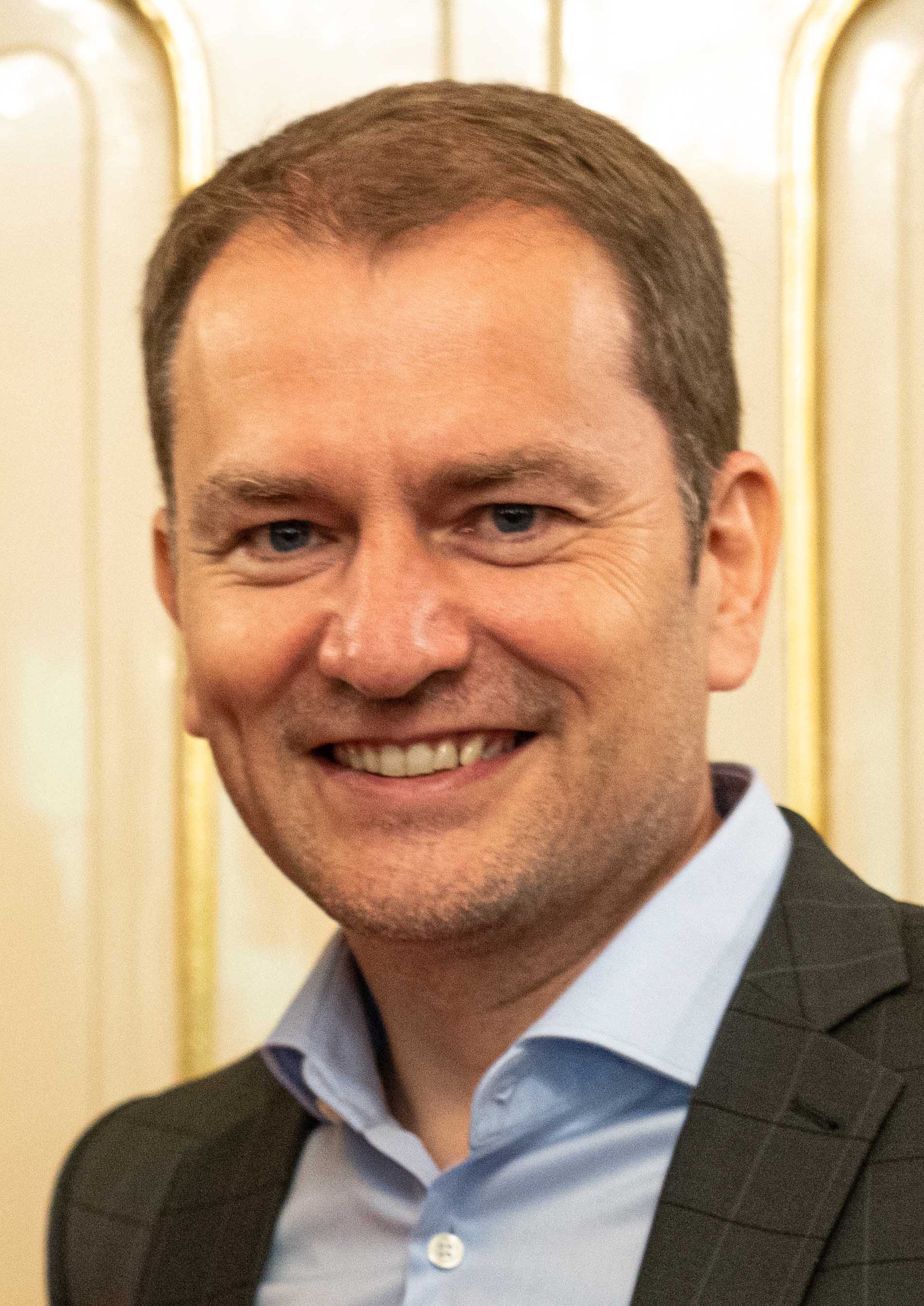
- Matovič in 2020

Prime Minister of Slovakia
- In office 21 March 2020 – 1 April 2021
- President: Zuzana Čaputová
- Deputy: See list: Eduard Heger; Štefan Holý; Veronika Remišová; Richard Sulík
- Preceded by: Peter Pellegrini
- Succeeded by: Eduard Heger

Deputy Prime Minister of Slovakia
- In office 1 April 2021 – 23 December 2022 Serving with Štefan Holý, Veronika Remišová, and Richard Sulík
- Prime Minister: Eduard Heger

Minister of Finance
- In office 1 April 2021 – 23 December 2022
- Prime Minister: Eduard Heger
- Preceded by: Eduard Heger
- Succeeded by: Eduard Heger

Member of the National Council
- Incumbent
- Assumed office 23 December 2022
- In office 8 July 2010 – 21 March 2020

Chairman of Slovakia Movement
- Incumbent
- Assumed office 28 October 2011
- Preceded by: Office established

Personal details
- Born: 11 May 1973 (age 53) Trnava, Czechoslovakia (now Slovakia)
- Party: Slovakia Movement (since 2011)
- Other political affiliations: Independent (2010–2011)
- Spouse: Pavlína Matovičová (m. 1999)
- Children: 2 daughters
- Education: Comenius University (Mgr.)

Igor Matovič (born 11 May 1973) is a Slovak politician and former businessman. He previously served as Deputy Prime Minister of Slovakia and Minister of Finance from April 2021 to December 2022 and Prime Minister from March 2020 to March 2021.

Born in Trnava, Matovič studied at Comenius University and went into the publishing business. Elected to the National Council in the 2010 Slovak parliamentary election on the Freedom and Solidarity party list, Matovič founded the Ordinary People (Obyčajní ľudia) movement in 2011, which ran on an anti-corruption platform and was politically aligned with the centre-right. His anti-corruption campaigning has been marked by "publicity stunts to shine a light on alleged graft", particularly focusing on parliamentary privileges and bribery.

In the 2020 Slovak parliamentary election, his party obtained a sufficient number of seats to form a coalition government with three other centrist and right-wing parties. The choices for Matovič's Cabinet were accepted by the then Slovak president Zuzana Čaputová, and he was appointed prime minister on 21 March 2020. He resigned on 1 April 2021 to be appointed deputy prime minister and Minister of Finance in the cabinet of Eduard Heger.

As of 2022, Matovič is the most distrusted Slovak political figure in the Slovak public, with a 91% distrust score.

== Early life and business career ==
Igor Matovič was born in Trnava on 11 May 1973. In 1993, he began to study at the Faculty of Management at Comenius University, graduating in 1998. However, as Matovič admitted in 2021, he plagiarized his diploma thesis.

He founded a business in 1997 and worked as the chief executive of a local media publishing house from 2002 to 2010. Matovič later signed over his assets to his wife, Pavlína (née Repaska). Agence France-Presse described him as an "eccentric self-made millionaire and former media boss" who had become "a media-savvy but unpredictable politician".

== Political career ==
In 2010, Matovič founded the Ordinary People (Obyčajní ľudia) civic movement, which was generally centre-right and emphasized anti-corruption. Matovič advertised the civic movement using free leaflets distributed by his family's press company. Along with three other OĽaNO MPs, he first won election at the 2010 election on the Freedom and Solidarity (SaS) list. He sat in the SaS caucus until February the following year, when he supported the opposition Smer's proposed restrictions on Multiple citizenship. Matovič's opposition to the government's position led to SaS being dropped from the coalition. In 2011, Iveta Radičová's government fell apart, which led to new elections in 2012. Led by Matovič, Ordinary People was reconstituted into OĽaNO (Ordinary People and Independent Personalities), an independent political party. OĽaNO won 8.55% and 16 seats. He stayed in the opposition as he was unwilling to work with Smer-SD.

As the leader of OĽaNO, Matovič attracted attention by campaigning against corruption. To oppose parliamentary immunity, he parked his car on a pedestrian crossing and showed his parliamentary pass to police who tried to tow it; to oppose corruption, he took a polygraph test stating that he had never accepted bribes. However, Robert Fico accused Matovič of impropriety in effecting a fictitious sale of the regionPRESS business for 122 million Slovak koruna to employee Pavel Vandák, who supposedly got the money from an internal account. Matovič denies this.

== Prime Minister of Slovakia ==
Matovič's party OĽaNO got the plurality of votes in the 2020 Slovak parliamentary election on 29 February 2020, winning 53 seats in the 150-member National Council with 25.02% of the vote. Corruption was a major issue in the election, which helped Matovič, who had long positioned himself as an anti-corruption activist. On 13 March, Matovič announced he had reached an agreement for a governing coalition with the other centrist and right-wing parties We Are Family, Freedom and Solidarity and For the People, though they had not agreed upon a common governing program. He did not disclose his picks for the new cabinet. Matovič submitted his cabinet selection to President Zuzana Čaputová on 16 March; she accepted all of the appointments. The new cabinet's composition was revealed on 18 March and was sworn in on 21 March.

Sociologist of the Bratislava Policy Institute, Michal Vašečka, stated that "Matovič has started to transform the anger of the society into a class war: city vs. countryside, educated vs. uneducated, common people vs. the elites." He suggested that it would result in political polarization.

=== Plagiarism controversy ===
In July 2020, Matovič admitted to plagiarizing his master's thesis after an investigation from Denník N found that entire pages and charts were lifted from the sources. He said he would step down after all his election promises were fulfilled. Comenius University in Bratislava confirmed the plagiarism of the master's thesis.

=== Government crisis and resignation ===
In March 2021, MP and chair of the parliamentary European affairs committee Tomáš Valášek announced his quitting from the government coalition and the For the People party in reaction to the purchase and subsequent arrival of the first 200,000 doses of the Sputnik V vaccine which Matovič and Minister of Health Marek Krajčí welcomed at the Košice airport. Following weeks of negotiations during the government crisis which ensued, Matovič resigned as prime minister on 30 March 2021. A new government was appointed with former Minister of Finance Eduard Heger of OĽANO becoming prime minister.

As a result of the plagiarism scandal and government crisis, Matovič's approval rating tanked from 64% in April 2020 to 15% in April 2021.

== Minister of Finance ==
Following the government crisis and his resignation as PM, Matovič was appointed Minister of Finance in the newly-formed Cabinet of Eduard Heger.

== Personal life ==
Matovič is married to Pavlína Matovičová, with whom he has two daughters.
