= Referendums in Slovakia =

Referendums in Slovakia are initiated by gathering 350,000 signatures from Slovak voters. In order to be valid, at least 50% of eligible voters must participate in the referendum. So far, only one referendum has had sufficient turnout, the 2003 Slovak European Union membership referendum, in which 52% of eligible voters cast a ballot and 92% elected to join the European Union.

== List of referendums ==
- 1994 Slovak disclosure referendum
- 1997 Slovak referendum
- 1998 Slovak privatisation referendum
- 2000 Slovak early parliamentary elections referendum
- 2003 Slovak European Union membership referendum
- 2004 Slovak early parliamentary elections referendum
- 2010 Slovak political reform referendum
- 2015 Slovak same-sex marriage referendum
- 2023 Slovak constitutional referendum
- 2026 Slovak referendum
