= Opinion polling for the 2023 Slovak parliamentary election =

In the run up to the 2023 Slovak parliamentary election, various organisations carried out opinion polling to gauge voting intention in Slovakia. Results of such polls are displayed in this article. The date range for these opinion polls are from the previous parliamentary election, held on 29 February 2020, to September 30th, 2023.

== Electoral polling ==
=== Graphical summary ===
A LOESS graph displaying the polls for the 2023 Slovak parliamentary election.

=== Voting intention estimates ===
Voting intention estimates made by polling firms that are members of the European Society for Opinion and Marketing Research (ESOMAR) and the Slovak Association of Research Agencies (SAVA). They are conducted in the form of telephone and personal interviews with selected persons, who form a representative sample reflecting the demographic parameters of the population of Slovakia. Respondents are asked: "Imagine that a parliamentary election would be held in Slovakia next Saturday. Would you vote in them and if so, which party would you vote for?" Respondents are read a list of currently active political parties.

Results are published that include only the answers of respondents who would vote for a particular party. The table shows political parties that have exceeded the electoral threshold in the last parliamentary election or oscillate above 4% in the polls. The electoral threshold is 5% for a single party, 7% for two- or three-party alliances, and 10% for party alliances of four or more parties (lacking in this year's election). 76 seats are required for an absolute majority in the National Council.

==== 2023 ====
Legend

- Exit poll

Polling firm	Date	Sample size	OĽaNO and Friends		Smer	SR	ĽSNS	PS	SASKA	KDH	MF	Alliance		Modrí, Most–Híd		Democrats	SNS	Hlas		REP	Others
Polling firm	Date	Sample size	OĽaNO	ZĽ	Smer	SR	ĽSNS	PS	SASKA	KDH	MF	SMK/MKP	MKÖ–MKS	Most–Híd	Modrí	Democrats	SNS	DV	Hlas	REP	Others
2023 elections	30 Sep 2023	2,967,896	8.90%		22.95%	2.21%	0.84%	17.96%	6.32%	6.82%	0.12%	4.39%		0.27%		2.93%	5.63%	14.70%		4.75%	1.21%
Focus	30 Sep 2023	—	8.0%		21.9%	–	–	23.5%	6.4%	5.3%	–	4.3%		–		3.0%	4.4%	12.2%		6.0%	5.0%
Median	30 Sep 2023	16,805	9.5%		19.1%	3.3%	–	20.0%	6.4%	6.4%	–	4.2%		–		3.4%	5.4%	11.2%		6.1%	5.0%
	28 Sep 2023	Election silence starting two days before election day																			
Median	25–26 Sep 2023	1,004	6.2% 0		19.8% 40	4.1% 0	–	19.3% 39	7.4% 15	7.7% 16	–	2.5% 0		2.1% 0		3.8% 0	4.8% 0	11.9% 24		8.0% 16	2.4%
Focus	22–26 Sep 2023	1,017	8.2% 15		18.0% 33	4.1% 0	1.7% 0	16.6% 30	5.8% 10	6.5% 12	0.6% 0	3.5% 0		0.7% 0		4.0% 0	6.4% 11	13.7% 25		7.7% 14	2.5% (Note: KSS 0.6%, SDKÚ-DS 0.4%, SRDCE 0.4%, Karma 0.3%, PRINCÍP 0.3%, Pirates 0.2%, My Slovensko 0.2%, Spravodlivosť 0.1%, Vlastenecký blok 0.0%, Slovenské Hnutie Obrody 0.0%, Spoločne občania Slovenska 0.0%)
AKO	20–26 Sep 2023	1,000	9.4% 16		17.7% 30	5.1% 8	0.3% 0	18.0% 30	7.3% 12	6.1% 10	0.6% 0	2.8% 0		1.0% 0		4.3% 0	6.0% 10	15.0% 25		5.4% 9	1.0% (Note: KSS 0.3%, My Slovensko 0.3%, Spravodlivosť 0.2%, SRDCE 0.2%)
Ipsos	22–25 Sep 2023	1,000	8.2% 14		20.6% 36	4.0% 0	1.6% 0	19.8% 34	7.0% 12	5.9% 10	0.1% 0	3.4% 0		0.6% 0		3.3% 0	5.7% 10	11.9% 21		7.6% 13	0.4%
SANEP	17–25 Sep 2023	1,697	6.0% 0		22.6% 41	5.5% 10	1.4% 0	16.1% 29	5.4% 10	5.1% 9	–	3.3% 0		1.3% 0		3.4% 0	6.0% 11	15.3% 27		7.4% 13	0.7%
NMS	21–24 Sep 2023	1,411	9.5%		19.4%	5.2%	1.8%	19.7%	5.7%	5.4%	0.3%	3.1%		1.1%		2.3%	5.4%	10.5%		8.5%	2.1% (Note: KSS 0.4%, SPRAVODLIVOSŤ 0.4%, Slovenské Hnutie Obrody 0.3%, Pirates 0.3%, Karma 0.2%, SRDCE 0.2%, MySlovensko 0.1%, Vlastenecký blok 0.1%, PRINCÍP 0.1%, SDKÚ–DS 0.1%, Spoločne občania Slovenska 0.0%)
Polis Slovakia	16–20 Sep 2023	1,110	5.7% 0		24.4% 42	5.3% 9	1.9% 0	15.1% 26	6.4% 11	5.7% 9	0.6% 0	5.4% 9		1.2% 0		2.0% 0	5.8% 10	12.6% 22		6.8% 12	1.1% (Note: KSS 1.1%)
Ipsos	15–19 Sep 2023	1,026	8.2% 15		20.3% 36	4.2% 0	2.6% 0	17.2% 31	6.1% 11	5.3% 9	0.6% 0	4.0% 0		0.9% 0		3.4% 0	5.6% 10	13.1% 23		8.6% 15	0.9%
SANEP	10–15 Sep 2023	1,782	6.0% 0		22.2% 43	5.9% 11	1.7% 0	15.7% 30	4.8% 0	5.6% 11	–	2.8% 0		1.2% 0		3.1% 0	5.8% 11	15.2% 29		7.5% 15	2.5%
Focus	6–13 Sep 2023	1,001	6.3% 0		18.9% 37	4.9% 0	1.8% 0	16.5% 33	5.1% 10	6.2% 12	0.8% 0	3.6% 0		1.5% 0		3.7% 0	6.4% 13	14.6% 29		8.0% 16	1.7% (Note: Pirates 0.5%, SDKÚ-DS 0.3%, KSS 0.3%, Karma 0.2%, My Slovensko 0.2%, SRDCE 0.1%, Vlastenecký blok 0.1%, PRINCÍP 0.0%, Spoločne občania Slovenska 0.0%, Spravodlivosť 0.0%, Slovenské Hnutie Obrody 0.0%)
AKO	5–11 Sep 2023	1,000	7.0% 12		19.4% 32	5.3% 9	0.6% 0	18.2% 31	7.4% 12	6.0% 10	0.3% 0	2.9% 0		1.4% 0		3.5% 0	6.0% 10	15.1% 25		5.2% 9	1.7% (Note: KSS 0.3%, Spravodlivosť 0.3%, My Slovensko 0.3%, SRDCE 0.3%, SDKÚ-DS 0.3%, Pirates 0.1%, PRINCÍP 0.1%, Spoločne občania Slovenska 0.0%, Vlastenecký blok 0.0%, Slovenské Hnutie Obrody 0.0%, Karma 0.0%)
NMS	5–9 Sep 2023	1,410	6.1%		22.0%	5.8%	1.0%	18.1%	4.2%	4.7%	0.4%	3.2%		0.9%		3.8%	7.3%	11.4%		8.3%	2.8% (Note: SPRAVODLIVOSŤ 0.7%, KSS 0.4%, MySlovensko 0.3%, Spoločne občania Slovenska 0.2%, Vlastenecký blok 0.2%, Karma 0.2%, Pirates 0.2%, SDKÚ–DS 0.1%, PRINCÍP 0.1%, SRDCE 0.1%, Slovenské Hnutie Obrody 0.0%)
Polis Slovakia	1–6 Sep 2023	1,002	5.4%		24.5%	5.8%	–	14.6%	6.8%	5.4%	–	–		–		1.2%	6.0%	12.8%		7.6%	9.9%
SANEP	27 Aug–2 Sep 2023	1,635	6.5% 0		21.4% 38	5.9% 11	2.0% 0	15.6% 28	6.1% 11	6.0% 11	–	2.7% 0		1.2% 0		3.0% 0	5.5% 10	15.0% 26		8.4% 15	0.7%
Median	25–31 Aug 2023	1,002	7.1% 12		17.8% 30	8.2% 13	2.3% 0	17.8% 30	6.7% 11	7.3% 12	–	–		–		3.6% 0	5.3% 9	9.4% 16		10.2% 17	4.4%
Median	21–24 Aug 2023	1,005	6.2% 0		20.2% 37	5.8% 10	2.4% 0	17.6% 32	7.3% 13	6.7% 12	–	–		–		4.1% 0	5.3% 10	10.0% 18		10.0% 18	4.4%
Polis Slovakia	11–16 Aug 2023	1,009	5.6% 0		23.4% 41	5.3% 9	2.2% 0	14.2% 25	6.5% 11	5.2% 9	1.1% 0	5.3% 9		1.8% 0		2.3% 0	6.1% 11	12.9% 23		6.6% 12	1.5% (Note: KSS 0.7%, Slovenské Hnutie Obrody 0.5%, Pirates 0.3%)
Focus	9–16 Aug 2023	1,009	6.4% 0		20.0% 37	5.1% 10	2.1% 0	15.0% 28	6.1% 11	6.1% 11	0.7% 0	3.4% 0		1.7% 0		3.1% 0	5.3% 10	14.2% 27		8.8% 16	2.0%
Ipsos	10–14 Aug 2023	1,003	7.7% 13		19.7% 34	5.5% 9	2.9% 0	16.9% 29	5.7% 10	6.2% 10	0.7% 0	3.6% 0		1.4% 0		2.9% 0	5.1% 9	13.3% 23		7.9% 13	0.5%
AKO	7–14 Aug 2023	1,000	7.2% 12		19.2% 32	5.7% 9	0.3% 0	17.8% 30	6.6% 11	6.2% 10	0.8% 0	2.5% 0		2.1% 0		2.9% 0	5.9% 10	15.0% 25		6.3% 11	1.4% (Note: Spravodlivosť 0.4%, SDKÚ-DS 0.4%, KSS 0.4%)
SANEP	6–13 Aug 2023	1,726	6.7% 0		22.0% 40	6.2% 11	1.8% 0	15.8% 28	6.0% 11	5.9% 11	–	2.9% 0		1.2% 0		3.1% 0	5.4% 10	13.0% 24		8.1% 15	1.9%
NMS	1–7 Aug 2023	1,416	6.3%		23.3%	5.6%	2.8%	17.0%	4.5%	5.0%	0.4%	3.0%		1.6%		2.6%	6.0%	11.5%		7.5%	2.6% (Note: SPRAVODLIVOSŤ 0.6%, KSS 0.5%, MySlovensko 0.3%, SDKÚ–DS 0.2%, Karma 0.2%, Slovenské Hnutie Obrody 0.2%, PRINCÍP 0.2%, SRDCE 0.1%, Spoločne občania Slovenska 0.1%, Pirates 0.1%, Vlastenecký blok 0.0%)
Ipsos	26 Jul–1 Aug 2023	1,001	7.9%		20.3%	5.6%	2.2%	16.9%	6.7%	5.4%	0.5%	2.2%		1.6%		2.6%	5.2%	13.4%		8.8%	–
SANEP	23–30 Jul 2023	1,675	6.9% 0		20.9% 38	6.4% 12	1.4% 0	15.5% 28	6.1% 11	6.0% 11	–	2.7% 0		1.1% 0		3.3% 0	5.2% 9	14.1% 25		8.8% 16	4.0%
AKO	24–28 Jul 2023	1,000	6.7% 0		19.9% 36	6.1% 11	1.2% 0	16.4% 30	6.6% 12	6.0% 11	0.9% 0	2.2% 0		1.5% 0		2.2% 0	5.8% 10	15.2% 28		6.7% 12	2.6% (Note: SRDCE 0.9%, Spravodlivosť 0.4%, Slovenské Hnutie Obrody 0.4%, Pirates 0.3%, SDKÚ-DS 0.3%, Spoločne občania Slovenska 0.1%, KSS 0.1%, My Slovensko 0.1%, Princíp 0.0%, Vlastenecký blok 0.0%, Karma 0.0%)
Polis Slovakia	22–27 Jul 2023	1,034	6.2% 0		23.1% 44	4.5% 0	3.1% 0	13.6% 26	5.2% 10	5.5% 10	1.6% 0	5.4% 10		2.5% 0		3.0% 0	5.4% 10	12.5% 24		8.4% 16	–
Focus	21–26 Jul 2023	1,024	6.2% 0		18.1% 35	5.6% 11	2.3% 0	14.3% 27	5.2% 10	5.6% 11	1.2% 0	4.0%		1.8%		3.8% 0	5.1% 9	16.0% 31		8.7% 16	– (Note: Pirates 1.2%)
Median	21–26 Jul 2023	1,010	5.3%		21.5%	7.4%	–	17.1%	6.5%	6.2%	–	2.4%		–		3.4%	4.2%	12.1%		9.7%	4.2%
Ipsos	17–21 Jul 2023	1,005	7.1%		19.4%	6.4%	2.6%	15.9%	5.0%	5.9%	0.8%	3.5%		1,8%		2.1%	5.0%	14.9%		8.6%	1.1%
Median	19–21 Jul 2023	1,008	5.5% 0		20.1% 38	6.1% 12	2.3% 0	19.1% 36	6.1% 12	6.5% 12	–	–		2.5% 0		4.2% 0	4.1% 0	11.1% 21		10.0% 19	2.4% 0
AKO	10–17 Jul 2023	1,000	7.2% 12		18.1% 31	6.2% 10	1.7% 0	15.4% 26	7.6% 13	5.9% 10	1.4% 0	1.7% 0		1.3% 0		2.2% 0	5.1% 9	16.5% 28		6.8% 11	–
SANEP	9–16 Jul 2023	1,542	8.5% 15		18.9% 32	6.4% 11	–	13.8% 24	6.7% 11	6.0% 10	–	–		–		–	5.1% 7	15.5% 26		8.0% 14	–
NMS	4–9 Jul 2023	1,413	6.9%		20.6%	5.3%	2.9%	15.6%	4.7%	5.7%	0.4%	3.4%		1.3%		2.8%	4.6%	11.4%		10.4%	– (Note: SDKÚ–DS 0.7%, SPRAVODLIVOSŤ 0.4%, Karma 0.4%, Spoločne občania Slovenska 0.3%, Pirates 0.2%, MySlovensko 0.2%, Slovenské Hnutie Obrody 0.2%, SRDCE 0.2%, Vlastenecký blok 0.1%, PRINCÍP 0.1%)
	2 Jul 2023	OĽaNO, For the People and Christian Union form an electoral coalition																			
SANEP	21–28 Jun 2023	1,671	6.7% 13	–	18.6% 34	6.8% 13	–	13.4% 22	6.4% 13	6.2% 12	–	–		–		–	–	16.5% 27		8.2% 16	–
Focus	21–28 Jun 2023	1,012	6.0% 10	0.7% 0	19.0% 33	6.1% 11	2.1% 0	13.5% 24	5.0% 9	6.0% 10	1.4% 0	3.9% 0		1.6% 0		3.6% 0	5.5% 9	16.3% 28		9.0% 16	–
Median	15 May–20 Jun 2023	1,036	7.1% 13	1.5% 0	18.0% 34	7.0% 13	3.0% 0	11.6% 22	6.6% 13	6.5% 12	–	–		–		4.7% 0	4.6% 0	14.1% 27		8.2% 16	7.1%
Ipsos	12–16 Jun 2023	1,001	6.4% 11	–	18.9% 34	7.2% 13	–	15.5% 28	7.2% 13	5.6% 10	–	3.1% 0		–		4.0% 0	4.3% 0	14.8% 26		8.3% 15	–
AKO	6–9 June 2023	1,000	7.1% 13	0.6% 0	19.0% 34	6.2% 11	1.0% 0	14.4% 25	7.8% 14	6.5% 11	2.1% 0	1.3% 0		1.3% 0		2.8% 0	4.7% 0	17.2% 30		7.0% 12	(Note: Christian Union 0.3%, Communist Party of Slovakia 0.3%, National Coalition / Independent Candidates 0.2%, Práca slovenského národa 0.2%)
NMS	2–8 Jun 2023	1,446	6.3%	1.8%	19.6%	6.8%	3.1%	15.2%	4.7%	6.0%	0.8%	3.4%		1.1%		1.8%	3.9%	14.1%		9.4%	(Note: Jablko 0.5%, Communist Party of Slovakia 0.3%, Socialisti.sk 0.2%)
Focus	24–31 May 2023	1,012	5.3% 10	1.1% 0	18.0% 34	6.6% 12	2.5% 0	12.5% 23	5.3% 10	5.5% 10	1.1% 0	4.0% 0		1.5% 0	1.0% 0	3.2% 0	4.7% 0	17.4% 33		9.7% 18	0.6%
Ipsos	16–19 May 2023	1,004	7.0%	2.2%	16.9%	7.5%	1.8%	13.3%	6.1%	5.2%	0.7%	3.8%			1.5%	3.4%	3.8%	15.6%		9.0%	2.1%
NMS	3–17 May 2023	1,233	7.3%	1.0%	21.3%	5.9%	1.7%	14.2%	6.2%	5.5%	0.7%	2.6%			0.9%	2.7%	3.1%	14.0%		8.7%	(Note: NK/NEKA 1.5%, Jablko 0.9%, Communist Party of Slovakia 0.5%, Socialisti.sk 0.4%, Life – National Party 0.2%)
	16 May 2023	Part of Most–Híd leaves Alliance																			
AKO	4–10 May 2023	1,000	7.4% 13	1.9% 0	18.0% 32	5.6% 10	0.7% 0	14.3% 26	8.3% 15	6.6% 12	3.1% 0	1.1% 0			1.1% 0	3.4% 0	4.4% 0	16.5% 30		6.9% 12	
Polis Slovakia	29 Apr–6 May 2023	1,011	6.6% 12	1.0% 0	24.2% 40	6.9% 12	2.4% 0	11.7% 20	6.5% 11	5.8% 10	0.6% 0	3.0% 0			–	2.1% 0	4.9% 0	17.0% 30		7.2% 13	(Note: Socialisti.sk 0.1%)
Median	1 Apr–6 May 2023	1,943	7.9% 15	1.8% 0	16.3% 30	9.2% 17	2.5% 0	11.6% 21	8.2% 15	6.8% 13	–	2.5% 0			–	4.0% 0	3.5% 0	–	13.9% 26	7.0% 11	–
	28 Apr 2023	Good Choice decided to run with Hlas																			
Focus	19 Apr–26 Apr 2023	1,013	5.6% 10	1.0% 0	17.7% 33	6.1% 11	2.7% 0	13.1% 25	5.2% 10	6.0% 11	1.7% 0	4.3% 0			–	3.6% 0	4.0% 0	1.1% 0	17.0% 32	9.8% 18	–
Ipsos	10 Apr–14 Apr 2023	1,000	7.0%	1.8%	16.8%	6.4%	2.3%	14.1%	6.4%	4.8%	–	2.4%			–	3.6%	4.2%	–	16.2%	8.8%	–
AKO	4 Apr–11 Apr 2023	1,000	5.8% 10	1.8% 0	17.9% 33	7.1% 13	1.4% 0	14.1% 26	8.3% 15	6.4% 12	2.1% 0	2.1% 0			–	4.1% 0	4.3% 0	0.5% 0	16.3% 29	6.6% 12	–
NMS	28 Mar–2 Apr 2023	1,018	5.2%	2.0%	22.4%	5.7%	1.9%	12.8%	5.1%	6.3%	1.3%	3.0%			0.8%	3.0%	2.4%	–	14.2%	9.9%	(Note: NK/NEKA 1.9%)
Focus	14–22 Mar 2023	1,018	4.3% 0	1.2% 0	17.6% 33	7.7% 14	2.7% 0	12.1% 23	5.1% 10	5.8% 11	1.5% 0	4.7% 0			–	5.0% 9	3.4% 0	1.4% 0	17.1% 32	9.6% 18	
AKO	12 Mar 2023	1,000	5.0%	1.6%	17.6%	6.8%	1.2%	15.1%	8.1%	6.7%	2.2%	1.9%			–	4.9%	4.2%	1.0%	16.1%	6.8%	–
Ipsos	Mar 2023	1,017	4.8%	2.9%	16.2%	8.5%	2.2%	11.1%	6.4%	5.7%	–	3.8%			–	4.8%	3.0%	–	16.0%	8.6%	–
	7 Mar 2023	Modrá koalícia refounded as Democrats																			
Median	1 Feb–5 Mar 2023	1,076	8.5%	2.2%	19.5%	7.4%	3.1%	11.4%	9.2%	6.3%	–	2.6%			–		4.2%	–	14.5%	6.1%	–
AKO	7–13 Feb 2023	1,000	7.3% 13	2.3% 0	16.3% 29	7.1% 13	1.5% 0	13.7% 24	7.9% 14	6.9% 12	2.8% 0	2.1% 0			1.3% 0		4.0% 0	–	18.9% 33	6.6% 12	0.7% (Note: National Coalition 0.5%)
Focus	1–8 Feb 2023	1,017	6.4% 12	1.0% 0	14.6% 27	7.7% 14	2.9% 0	11.0% 20	5.3% 10	6.9% 13	1.9% 0	4.5% 0			2.0% 0		3.6% 0	1.4% 0	20.8% 38	8.5% 16	1.5% (Note: Slovak PATRIOT 0.6%, National Coalition 0.4%, Christian Union 0.2%, Domov – národná strana 0.2%, Jablko 0.1%)
Median	9 Jan–5 Feb 2023	1,029	8.7%	2.0%	17.9%	10.9%	2.4%	9.6%	7.8%	6.4%	–	4.0%			1.8%		2.0%	1.8%	15.6%	4.5%	–
Polis Slovakia	28 Jan–1 Feb 2023	1,002	7.2% 13	3.1% 0	21.0% 39	6.5% 12	2.3% 0	9.5% 17	5.2% 10	5.0% 10	0.6% 0	4.7% 0			1.0% 0		3.8% 0	3.5% 0	19.4% 36	7.1% 13	(Note: Life – National Party 1.3%, National Coalition 0.6%, Socialisti.sk 0.4%, Homeland 0.2%)
	27 Jan 2023	SPOLU refounded as Modrá koalícia																			
	21 Jan 2023	2023 Slovak constitutional referendum																			
Ipsos	18–20 Jan 2023	1,010	8.1%	2.0%	13.6%	8.0%	3.2%	12.6%	6.9%	6.5%	–	3.2%			–	–	2.9%	–	18.2%	8.1%	–
AKO	10–16 Jan 2023	1,000	8.7% 15	2.9% 0	15.9% 28	6.8% 12	1.9% 0	13.2% 24	9.1% 16	6.2% 11	1.9% 0	2.1% 0			–	0.1% 0	4.1% 0	0.6% 0	17.6% 31	7.3% 13	1.6% (Note: National Coalition 0.6%, Communist Party of Slovakia 0.4%, Socialisti.sk 0.3%, Democratic Party (Slovakia, 2006) 0.1%, Life – National Party 0.1%, Slovak PATRIOT 0.1%)
Median	19–23 Dec 2022	1,006	6.3%	2.0%	16.7%	6.0%	2.0%	14.1%	6.5%	6.1%	–	2.7%			–	–	–	–	19.1%	9.6%	–

==== 2022 ====
Polling firm	Date	Sample size	OĽaNO	SMER-SD	SR	ĽSNS	PS	SPOLU	SaS	ZĽ	KDH	MF	ALI			SNS	DV	HLAS-SD	REP	Others		
Polling firm	Date	Sample size	OĽaNO	SMER-SD	SR	ĽSNS	PS	SPOLU	SaS	ZĽ	KDH	MF	M-H	SMK-MKP	Ö-S	SNS	DV	HLAS-SD	REP	Others		
Polling firm	Date	Focus	16–20 Dec 2022	1,180	7.4% 14	16.6% 30	8.2% 15	3.1% 0	12.8% 23	1.0% 0	5.6% 10	2.2% 0	5.9% 11	1.1% 0	4.4% 0			3.4% 0	1.1% 0	19.0% 35	6.9% 12	1.3%
	15 Dec 2022	Heger Cabinet loses vote of no-confidence																				
Ako	6–12 Dec 2022	1,000	8.0% 14	16.1% 28	7.7% 13	1.7% 0	11.8% 21	0.2% 0	9.9% 17	1.7% 0	5.5% 10	1.3% 0	3.1% 0			4.0% 0	0.9% 0	20.2% 35	6.6% 12	1.4% (Note: National Coalition 0.8%, Life – National Party 0.2%, Socialisti.sk 0.2%, Slovak PATRIOT 0.2%)		
Focus	30 Nov–7 Dec 2022	1,007	7.0% 12	15.8% 27	7.3% 13	3.0% 0	10.3% 18	0.7% 0	7.7% 13	2.7% 0	6.0% 10	1.6% 0	5.1% 9			3.7% 0	1.1% 0	19.9% 34	7.9% 14	0.2% (Note: Communist Party of Slovakia 0.1%, Slovak PATRIOT 0.1%)		
Polis Slovakia	25–30 Nov 2022	1,058	6.1%	20.0%	5.5%	2.1%	8.8%	–	7.0%	3.1%	5.0%	–	4.8%			3.6%	2.9%	20.1%	7.2%	3.8% (Note: Life – National Party 2.8%, National Coalition 0.5%, Socialisti.sk 0.5%)		
Ipsos	22–28 Nov 2022	1,023	8.0%	15.6%	7.0%	2.9%	10.4%	–	7.8%	3.4%	7.4%	–	3.8%			2.6%	–	19.7%	6.0%	5.4%		
AKO	8–11 Nov 2022	1,000	7.5%	16.0%	6.9%	1.9%	11.5%	0.4%	10.8%	1.9%	6.1%	1.8%	2.6%			4.2%	1.5%	19.5%	6.3%	1.1%		
Median	25 Oct–8 Nov 2022	1,011	3.9%	14.2%	5.8%	3.9%	9.8%	–	6.5%	2.4%	5.8%	–	–			–	–	18.6%	11.8%	17.3%		
Ipsos	18–21 Oct 2022	1,018	7.9%	14.8%	7.5%	2.6%	10.9%	1.0%	8.5%	2.8%	6.5%	1.0%	2.9%			3.0%	1.1%	20.2%	6.8%	2.5%		
Focus	21–27 Sep 2022	1,009	7.2% 13	15.3% 28	7.0% 13	2.9% 0	9.6% 18	0.7% 0	8.2% 15	2.4% 0	6.2% 11	1.7% 0	4.6% 0			3.9% 0	1.5% 0	20.3% 38	7.8% 14			
Ipsos	14–20 Sep 2022	1,018	7.8%	15.5%	7.5%	2.7%	11.6%	–	9.3%	1.7%	6.5%	–	2.1%			2.8%	–	18.3%	7.0%	7.2%		
AKO	8 Sep–14 Sep 2022	1000	7.9% 14	15.0% 27	7.6% 13	2.3% 0	10.0% 18	–	12.9% 23	2.3% 0	6.2% 11	–	2.7% 0			4.2% 0	1.0% 0	19.3% 35	5.2% 9	4.4%		
Polis; Slovakia	28 Aug–4 Sep 2022	1,003	6.1% 11	19.1% 34	6.9% 12	3.4% 0	7.1% 13	0.2% 0	15.6% 28	–	5.1% 9	–	4.5% 0			3.4% 0	2.2% 0	17.0% 31	7.1% 13	2.3% (Note: Life – National Party 2.2%)		
AKO	15–18 Aug 2022	1,000	8.4%	14.9%	6.6%	2.1%	9.9%	–	13.1%	2.1%	6.9%	–	2.5%			4.1%	1.2%	19.2%	5.3%	3.7%		
Ipsos	29 Jul–8 Aug 2022	1,038	7.8%	15.5%	6.4%	2.9%	11.4%	–	12.2%	3.0%	6.3%	–	2.1%			2.3%	–	17.2%	7.3%	5.6%		
AKO	7–14 Jul 2022	1,000	9.2% 16	14.6% 25	6.0% 10	1.5% 0	9.8% 17	–	14.7% 26	2.2% 0	7.2% 12	1.8% 0	1.1% 0			4.1% 0	1.5% 0	20.0% 35	5.4% 9	8.3%		
	6 Jul 2022	SaS terminates its coalition agreement with the other government parties.																				
Focus	20–27 Jun 2022	1,005	7.1% 13	14.4% 26	7.6% 14	3.3% 0	9.1% 17	1.0% 0	9.6% 18	2.1% 0	6.7% 12	1.8% 0	4.1% 0			4.0% 0	1.2% 0	20.5% 38	6.8% 12	8.7% (Note: Umiernení 1.2%)		
AKO	7–10 Jun 2022	1,000	8.5% 15	14.8% 26	5.7% 10	1.8% 0	9.9% 17	–	14.3% 25	2.2% 0	7.3% 13	1.9% 0	1.9% 0			4.2% 0	–	20.2% 35	5.2% 9	8.2%		
Focus	25–31 May 2022	1,008	8.1% 15	14.9% 27	5.6% 10	2.8% 0	9.1% 17	1.1% 0	11.1% 20	3.1% 0	6.5% 12	1.1% 0	3.7% 0			3.7% 0	1.4% 0	20.3% 37	6.8% 12	8.0%		
AKO	10–16 May 2022	1,000	10.7% 18	13.5% 24	6.1% 10	1.1% 0	9.7% 17	–	14.3% 25	2.1% 0	7.7% 13	2.0% 0	2.4% 0			4.0% 0	1.5% 0	18.2% 32	6.2% 11	8.0% (Note: Umiernení 1.5%)		
Polis; Slovakia	18–23 Apr 2022	1,003	7.8% 13	17.9% 31	7.2% 12	3.1% 0	5.7% 10	0.5% 0	13.2% 23	1.0% 0	5.3% 9	–	6.1% 11			3.1% 0	2.8% 0	17.9% 31	6.0% 10	8.8% (Note: Homeland 1.9%, Life – National Party 0.5%)		
AKO	5–11 Apr 2022	1,000	8.9% 16	14.5% 26	6.6% 12	3.0% 0	8.7% 15	0.6% 0	14.0% 25	2.0% 0	6.5% 11	2.1% 0	2.6% 0			3.9% 0	0.9% 0	18.9% 34	6.2% 11	8.1% (Note: Green Party 0.2%, Communist Party of Slovakia 0.2%, Civic Conservative Party 0.2%)		
Focus	30 Mar–6 Apr 2022	1,007	8.1% 15	15.1% 28	7.5% 14	4.5% 0	7.3% 14	0.6% 0	10.3% 19	2.5% 0	6.3% 12	1.6% 0	4.4% 0			3.6% 0	1.9% 0	19.0%	6.9% 13	8.1%		
Median	1–3 Mar 2022	1,000	10.7%	14.1%	6.7%	2.3%	11.0%	1.6%	13.2%	2.8%	6.8%	–	2.9%			1.1%	2.0%	14.1%	7.0%	8.4%		
Focus	22 Feb–1 Mar 2022	1,003	7.8% 14	15.6% 29	6.3% 12	3.8% 0	8.1% 15	–	12.0% 22	2.7% 0	6.0% 11	–	4.6% 0			3.8% 0	1.1% 0	18.5% 34	7.0% 13	7.6%		
AKO	8–14 Feb 2022	1,000	8.0% 14	14.5% 26	6.9% 12	2.5% 0	8.7% 16	1.2% 0	14.2% 22	2.3% 0	7.2% 13	0.3% 0	4.1% 0			3.8% 0	1.2% 0	17.5% 31	6.9% 12	7.2% (Note: Umiernených 1.2%, Socialisti.sk 0.3%, Demokratická strana 0.2%, Life – National Party 0.2%)		
Median	27 Jan–1 Feb 2022	1,006	9.5%	15.6%	5.7%	4.1%	10.6%	0.9%	13.5%	2.5%	5.0%	–	3.4%			3.3%	–	13.5%	5.6%	11.0%		
Focus	19–26 Jan 2022	1,017	8.0% 14	16.3% 30	6.1% 11	4.3% 0	8.3% 15	0.7% 0	11.1% 21	3.0% 0	5.8% 11	–	4.4% 0			3.9% 0		17.8% 33	7.8% 14	7.1%		

==== 2020–2021 ====
Polling firm	Date	Sample size	OĽaNO	SMER-SD	SR	ĽSNS	PS-SPOLU		SaS	ZĽ	KDH		ALI			SNS	DV	HLAS-SD	REP	Others
Polling firm	Date	Sample size	OĽaNO	SMER-SD	SR	ĽSNS	PS	SPOLU	SaS	ZĽ	KDH	MKÖ-MKS			M-H	SNS	DV	HLAS-SD	REP	Others
Polling firm	Date	Sample size	OĽaNO	SMER-SD	SR	ĽSNS	PS	SPOLU	SaS	ZĽ	KDH	MF	SMK-MKP	Ö-S	M-H	SNS	DV	HLAS-SD	REP	Others
AKO	10–17 Jan 2022	1,000	9.3% 17	13.8% 25	6.5% 12	2.9% 0	8.5% 15	0.8% 0	14.2% 25	2.2% 0	6.0% 11	0.5% 0	4.0% 0			3.6% 0	2.0% 0	18.0% 33	6.2% 11	8.4% (Note: Umiernených 2.0%, Socialisti.sk 0.5%, Communist Party of Slovakia 0.3%, Naša vlasť 0.3%, Life – National Party 0.2%, Národná koalícia 0.2%)
AKO	7–12 Dec 2021	1,000	9.0% 16	13.7% 25	6.5% 12	3.4% 0	8.6% 15	–	13.9% 25	2.4% 0	6.0% 11	–	3.7% 0			3.6% 0	2.2% 0	19.0% 35	5.9% 11	7.9%
Focus	16–23 Nov 2021	1,005	7.9% 15	15.0% 28	6.1% 11	4.8% 0	7.7% 14	1.0% 0	11.5% 22	2.1% 0	6.1% 11	–	4.4% 0			3.6% 0	2.1% 0	19.2% 36	6.8% 13	8.4%
AKO	8–16 Nov 2021	1,000	9.7% 18	13.0% 24	6.8% 13	3.5% 0	8.7% 16	0.9% 0	13.6% 25	2.2% 0	5.4% 10	1.0% 0	4.2% 0			3.6% 0	2.3% 0	18.5% 34	5.6% 10	8.8%
Focus	20–27 Oct 2021	1,009	8.4% 15	15.5% 27	6.3% 11	3.8% 0	6.9% 12	1.1% 0	12.2% 21	2.8% 0	6.1% 11	–	5.2% 9			3.3% 0	2.2% 0	19.3% 34	5.5% 10	8.0%
Actly	17–20 Oct 2021	1,006	6.8% 12	17.7% 32	9.4% 17	2.4% 0	5.9% 11	1.0% 0	10.5% 19	2.8% 0	5.9% 11	–	3.9% 0			3.1% 0	2.0% 0	21.0%	5.1% 9	8.6% (Note: Life – National Party 1.0%, Christian Union 1.0%)
AKO	4–7 Oct 2021	1,000	9.2% 17	13.8% 25	7.4% 13	2.3% 0	8.6% 16	1.2% 0	14.5% 26	2.1% 0	5.9% 11	0.5% 0	4.5% 0			3.6% 0	1.8% 0	18.2% 33	5.0% 9	8.5% (Note: Socialisti.sk 0.5%, Communist Party of Slovakia 0.5%, Slovenské Hnutie Obrody 0.2%, Slovak PATRIOT 0.2%)
AKO	6–13 Sep 2021	1,000	9.9% 18	13.9% 25	6.8% 12	2.7% 0	8.7% 15	0.8% 0	14.5% 26	1.7% 0	6.6% 12	1.1% 0	3.8% 0			3.5% 0	0.9% 0	18.8% 33	5.2% 9	7.4% (Note: Life – National Party 0.5%, Demokratická strana 0.2%, MÁME TOHO DOSŤ 0.2%, Socialisti.sk 0.1%, Green Party 0.1%)
Focus	1–7 Sep 2021	1,002	8.2% 14	14.4% 25	6.7% 12	4.6% 0	7.0% 12	–	11.7% 21	2.2% 0	6.1% 11	–	5.5% 10			–	–	18.5% 33	6.8% 12	8.3%
Median	31 Aug–6 Sep 2021	1,018	10.0%	12.7%	7.2%	3.3%	8.6%	–	12.3%	3.9%	4.8%	–	4.8%			–	–	16.3%	5.4%	10.7%
AKO	10–15 Aug 2021	1,000	9.8% 19	11.3% 22	6.6% 13	3.9% 0	8.9% 17	1.2% 0	14.7% 29	3.0% 0	6.3% 12	0.5% 0	3.3% 0			3.5% 0	1.5% 0	19.5% 38	4.5% 0	8.2% (Note: Socialisti.sk 0.5%, Communist Party of Slovakia 0.3%, Life – National Party 0.2%, Green Party 0.2%, STAROSTOVIA A NEZÁVISLÍ KANDIDÁTI 0.2%, Slovenské Hnutie Obrody 0.1%)
AKO	6–12 Jul 2021	1,000	8.8%	10.9%	7.8%	3.5%	8.4%	1.9%	13.8%	3.1%	6.2%	0.7%	4.3%			3.4%	1.9%	20.8%	3.8%	
	7 Jul 2021	The Constitutional Court judges the opposition's snap election referendum unconstitutional																		
AKO	7–11 Jun 2021	1,000	9.0%	10.6%	7.8%	3.0%	8.3%	1.6%	13.9%	3.6%	5.3%	1.4%	5.2%			3.1%	2.5%	21.0%	2.8%	
Focus	2–9 Jun 2021	1,011	8.2%	12.0%	7.6%	4.8%	6.3%	1.5%	12.8%	3.4%	5.8%	0.5%	5.7%			3.2%	1.3%	21.6%	4.6%	
Focus	11–19 May 2021	1,008	8.8%	11.8%	7.2%	4.9%	6.1%	1.3%	12.3%	3.5%	5.7%	0.9%	4.8%			3.4%	1.4%	22.4%	4.5%	
AKO	13–17 May 2021	1,000	9.9%	9.6%	7.4%	2.1%	8.5%	1.6%	13.8%	4.0%	5.0%	0.6%	5.3			1.6%	3.0%	22.5%	3.5%	
AKO	12–17 Apr 2021	1,000	10.0%	9.2%	7.4%	2.9%	8.3%	0.9%	13.8%	4.3%	4.5%	0.5%	4.2%			3.3%	3.1%	23.9%	3.1%	
Focus	31 Mar–7 Apr 2021	1,001	9.2%	10.9%	7.4%	4.3%	6.2%	0.8%	11.2%	4.8%	5.7%	0.5%	5.0%			3.4%	1.8%	22.3%	4.7%	
	1 Apr 2021	Appointment of the Heger's Cabinet following the agreement of the original government partners																		
	3–28 Mar 2021	Government crisis following government SaS and ZĽ's call for the resignation of the Prime Minister Igor Matovič																		
AKO	8–12 Mar 2021	1,000	13.1%	8.7%	5.9%	4.3%	8.0%	0.3%	14.3%	4.3%	5.2%	0.2%	1.1%	0.2%	0.8%	3.0%	2.8%	24.9%	—N/a	
Focus	17–24 Feb 2021	1.018	10.4%	9.2%	5.2%	6.6%	6.7%	0.6%	12.9%	5.2%	4.9%	0.4%	3.5%	1.3%	2.1%	2.8%	1.9%	23.0%	—N/a	
AKO	8–11 Feb 2021	1,000	13.8%	8.5%	5.1%	3.8%	7.2%	0.7%	15.1%	5.4%	4.9%	0.7%	2.0%	0.8%	0.8%	2.3%	1.6%	25.0%	—N/a	
Focus	12–19 Jan 2021	1,005	10.1%	9.1%	5.1%	9.7%	5.2%	1.0%	13.3%	4.2%	4.4%	–	3.3%	0.6%	2.0%	2.8%	2.1%	24.3%	—N/a	
AKO	17–19 Dec 2020	1,000	14.2%	9.0%	5.7%	5.7%	6.5%	0.5%	16.2%	4.7%	4.7%	0.5%	1.3%	1.3%	0.9%	1.6%	1.4%	22.8%	—N/a	
Focus	8–14 Dec 2020	1,000	11%	9.8%	5.4%	8.2%	6.0%	0.4%	15.8%	4.4%	4.9%	–	3.3%	0.8%	2.0%	2.7%	2.1%	20.1%	—N/a	
Focus	18–25 Nov 2020	1,004	14.0%	9.5%	6.1%	9.6%	5.9%	1.0%	12.1%	4.1%	5.1%	–	3.3%	0.5%	2.1%	2.2%	2.8%	19.1%	—N/a	
Focus	7–15 Oct 2020	1,014	15.1%	10.5%	7.3%	9.8%	5.4%	0.3%	10.7%	4.8%	5.2%	–	3.2%	0.4%	2.4%	2.1%	2.1%	18.7%	—N/a	
AKO	1–9 Oct 2020	1,000	15.3%	8.3%	8.8%	8.5%	6.2%	1.8%	13.4%	4.2%	3.0%	0.3%	2.4%	0.2%	1.9%	2.4%	2.8%	18.8%	—N/a	
Focus	26 Aug–2 Sep 2020	1,022	18.4% 35	10.9% 21	9.1% 17	8.5% 16	5.9% 11	0.6% 0	9.9% 19	3.9% 0	4.5% 0	–	3.1% 0	0.7% 0	1.7% 0	3.0% 0	1.9% 0	16.2% 31	—N/a	
AKO	7–17 Jul 2020	1,000	23.5% 44	10.7% 20	6.4% 12	7.9% 15	5.2% 10	2.2% 0	9.4% 18	4.0% 0	3.0% 0	–	2.5% 0	–	1.0% 0	1.4% 0	2.6% 0	16.7% 31	—N/a	
Focus	17–24 Jun 2020	1,009	21.2% 41	19.0% 37	12.8% 25	9.6% 18	6.2% 12	0.8% 0	9.2% 17	3.6% 0	4.6% 0	0.3% 0	3.7% 0	0.5% 0	1.5% 0	2.1% 0	2.4% 0	—N/a	—N/a	
Focus	14–21 May 2020	1,011	22.9% 43	21.6% 41	11.2% 21	9.7% 18	6.5% 12	0.2% 0	8.0% 15	4.3% 0	4.8% 0	–	4.2% 0	–	1.5% 0	1.4% 0	2.0% 0	—N/a	—N/a	
Focus	15–19 Apr 2020	1,016	24.4% 45	21.8% 40	11.5% 21	9.2% 17	7.6% 14		6.8% 13	3.2% 0	4.5% 0	–	2.8% 0	–	1.8% 0	1.6% 0	1.1% 0	—N/a	—N/a	
AKO	14–17 Apr 2020	1,000	29.9% 56	18.3% 34	10.0% 18	6.4% 12	6.9% 12	0.9% 0	9.7% 18	3.0% 0	3.7% 0	4.4% 0			0.6% 0	2.2% 0	2.2% 0	—N/a	—N/a	
	21 Mar 2020	Matovič's Cabinet appointed, following an agreement between OĽaNO, SR, SaS and ZĽ																		
Focus	18–21 Mar 2020	1,023	23.3%	21.6%	11.5%	7.3%	5.9%		5.8%	5.2%	4.1%	3.5%			1.3%	3.4%	2.4%	—N/a	—N/a	
2020 elections	29 February 2020		25.0% 53	18.3% 38	8.2% 17	8.0% 17	7.0% 0		6.2% 13	5.8% 12	4.7% 0	3.9% 0			2.1% 0	3.2% 0	3.1% 0	—N/a	—N/a	
																				Others
			OĽaNO	SMER-SD	SR	ĽSNS	PS	SPOLU	SaS	ZĽ	KDH	MF	SMK-MKP	Ö-S	M-H	SNS	DV	HLAS-SD	REP	Others
			OĽaNO	SMER-SD	SR	ĽSNS	PS	SPOLU	SaS	ZĽ	KDH	MKÖ-MKS			M-H	SNS	DV	HLAS-SD	REP	Others
			OĽaNO	SMER-SD	SR	ĽSNS	PS-SPOLU		SaS	ZĽ	KDH		ALI			SNS	DV	HLAS-SD	REP	Others

== Leadership polling ==
=== Confidence rating ===
Polling firm	Fieldwork date	Sample size											
Polling firm	Fieldwork date	Sample size	Matovič OĽaNO	Fico SMER–SSD	Kollár SR	Kotleba ĽSNS	Bihariová PS	Sulík SaS	Remišová ZĽ	Majerský KDH	Forró ALI	Pellegrini HLAS–SD	Uhrík REP
22 Feb–1 Mar 2022	Focus	1,003	11%	26%	24%	14%	16%	27%	17%	19%	8%	39%	21%
