= List of members of the National Council of Slovakia, 2020–2023 =

The National Council of Slovakia was elected at the 2020 Slovak parliamentary election and consisted of 150 representatives elected from party lists. Those elected will sat on the National Council until 2023.

This parliament had to conduct some of its sessions during the summer of 2023 outside of the usual chamber for the first time since opening of the parliament building in 1994 (excluding ceremonial sessions) due to chamber renovations. These sessions were held in Bratislava Castle hippodrome.

== Election results ==
Party	Votes	%	Swing	Seats	+/–
OĽANO–NOVA–KU–ZMENA ZDOLA	721,166	25.02	+13.99	53	+34
Direction – Social Democracy	527,172	18.29	–9.99	38	–11
We Are Family	237,531	8.24	+1.61	17	+6
Kotlebists – People's Party Our Slovakia	229,660	7.97	–0.07	17	+3
Progressive Slovakia–SPOLU	200,780	6.96	New	0	New
Freedom and Solidarity	179,246	6.22	–5.88	13	–8
For the People	166,325	5.77	New	12	New
Christian Democratic Movement	134,099	4.65	–0.29	0	0
Party of the Hungarian Community	112,662	3.90	–0.15	0	0
Slovak National Party	91,171	3.16	–5.48	0	–15
Good Choice	88,220	3.06	New	0	New
HOMELAND	84,507	2.93	New	0	New
Most–Híd	59,174	2.05	–4.45	0	–11
Socialisti.sk	15,925	0.55	New	0	New
WE HAVE HAD ENOUGH!	9,260	0.32	New	0	New
Andrej Hlinka's Slovak People's Party	8,191	0.28	New	0	New
Democratic Party	4,194	0.14	–0.13	0	0
Solidarity – Working Poverty Movement	3,296	0.11	New	0	New
Mayors and Independents	2,018	0.07	New	0	New
Slovak Revival Movement	1,966	0.06	New	0	New
Popular Voice	1,887	0.06	New	0	New
Labour of Slovak Nation	1,261	0.04	New	0	New
99 Percent – Civic Voice	991	0.03	New	0	New
Slovak League	809	0.02	New	0	New
Invalid/blank votes	35,329	–	–	–	–
Total	2,916,840	100	0	150	0
Registered voters/turnout	4,432,419	65.80	–	–	–
Source: Statistical Office of the Slovak Republic

== Elected members ==
- Lucia Ďuriš Nicholsonová
- Richard Sulík
- Igor Matovič
- Eduard Heger
- Radovan Sloboda
- Romana Tabak
- Marek Krajčí
- Boris Kollár
- Robert Fico
- Tomáš Taraba
