= Opinion polling for the 2020 Slovak parliamentary election =

In the run up to the 2020 Slovak parliamentary election, various organisations carry out opinion polling to gauge voting intention in Slovakia. Results of such polls are displayed in this article.

The date range for these opinion polls are from the previous parliamentary election, held on 5 Mar 2016, to the present day.

== Party vote ==
Poll results are listed in the tables below in reverse chronological order, showing the most recent first, and using the date the survey's fieldwork was done, as opposed to the date of publication. If such date is unknown, the date of publication is given instead. The highest percentage figure in each polling survey is displayed in bold, and the background shaded in the leading party's colour. In the instance that there is a tie, then no figure is shaded. The lead column on the right shows the percentage–point difference between the two parties with the highest figures. When a specific poll does not show a data figure for a party, the party's cell corresponding to that poll is shown empty.

A local regression graph of all polls conducted

Color key:

Exit poll

=== Voting intention estimates ===
Date	Polling firm	Sample size	Smer	SaS	OĽaNO (Note: OĽaNO runs a common list with NOVA, Kresťanská únia, and ZMENA ZDOLA under its name.)	SNS	Kotlebovci–ĽSNS (Note: K-ĽSNS runs a common list with KDŽP-Aliancia za Slovensko, Národná Koalícia, Doma Dobre, and Priama Demokracia under its name.)	SR	Most–Híd (Note: Most-Híd runs a common list with Šanca under its name.)	KDH	MKÖ–MKS (Note: SMK runs a common list with Maďarské Forum, and Maďarská Spolupatričnosť under name MKO-MKS.)	PS	SPOLU	ZĽ	Vlasť	DV	Lead
**29 Feb 2020**	**2020 elections**		**18.29%**	**6.22%**	**25.02%**	**3.16%**	**7.97%**	**8.24%**	**2.05%**	**4.65%**	**3.90%**	**6.96%**		**5.77%**	**2.93%**	**3.06%**	**6.73%**
29 Feb 2020	Median		13.9%	6.4%	**25.3%**	3.0%	8.8%	7.5%	2.8%	5.0%	4.4%	8.8%		5.6%	2.7%	2.9%	11.4%
29 Feb 2020	Focus		14.9%	8.3%	**25.8%**	2.4%	6.5%	7.5%	2.0%	5.1%	3.8%	9.7%		7.8%	1.9%	2.8%	10.9%
20–24 Feb 2020	Focus+AKO	2000	15.6%	7.0%	**19.1%**	3.4%	9.8%	7.2%	3.9%	4.8%	3.5%	9.4%		6.6%	4.1%	3.6%	3.5%
13–18 Feb 2020	Focus+AKO	2000	**17.2%**	6.1%	16.4%	3.6%	10.4%	7.9%	4.0%	5.2%	2.9%	9.1%		8.2%	3.2%	3.8%	0.8%
15 Feb 2020	**Moratorium on opinion polls in effect**																
11–13 Feb 2020	AKO	1005	**16.9%**	6.1%	15.5%	5.0%	10.3%	7.2%	4.7%	5.3%	3.0%	9.4%		8.9%	1.5%	4.3%	1.4%
6–12 Feb 2020	Focus	1005	**17.0%**	5.3%	13.3%	4.4%	12.2%	7.8%	4.2%	5.4%	3.9%	9.3%		8.2%	3.2%	4.0%	3.7%
3–6 Feb 2020	AKO	1000	**17.3%**	5.8%	13.5%	5.1%	11.8%	6.4%	4.5%	5.3%	3.2%	8.7%		9.5%	2.2%	4.1%	3.8%
24–31 Jan 2020	MVK	1123	**21.9%**	3.8%	8.9%	6%	12.7%	6.5%	2.9%	7.5%	4.6%	8.1%		8.5%	2.4%	2.9%	9.2%
23–30 Jan 2020	Polis	1109	**17.1%**	5.2%	12%	5.5%	11.1%	6.3%	4.8%	5.5%	3.5%	9.1%		10%	3.9%	4.6%	5.1%
15–22 Jan 2020	Focus	1013	**18%**	5.5%	9%	5.2%	12.8%	7.6%	4.4%	5.7%	4%	9.8%		10.8%	2%	4%	5.8%
15–17 Jan 2020	AKO	1000	**17.1%**	6.7%	8.4%	5.9%	11%	7.9%	4.2%	5.5%	3.2%	10.2%		10%	2.3%	3.4%	6.1%
10–15 Jan 2020	Polis	1140	**17.1%**	5.6%	10%	6.3%	12.4%	5.6%	4.9%	6%	4.3%	8.4%		9.7%	3.8%	4.1%	4.7%
10–14 Jan 2020	Focus	1010	**18.7%**	5.4%	7.7%	5.1%	13.6%	7.1%	4.0%	6.0%	3.7%	10.5%		10.3%	2.3%	3.3%	5.1%
7–9 Jan 2020	AKO	1000	**17.7%**	6.8%	8.3%	6.2%	11.7%	7.6%	4.1%	6.2%	2.5%	9.1%		10.4%	1.7%	3.2%	6.0%
7–11 Dec 2019	Polis	1131	**18.1%**	5.2%	9.8%	7.0%	12.2%	5.5%	5.2%	6.1%	5.2%	9.5%		10.1%	2.2%	2.4%	5.9%
2–9 Dec 2019	Focus	1008	**19.6%**	5.7%	8.0%	5.4%	11.8%	7.0%	4.3%	5.7%	4.3%	10.3%		9.2%	2.1%	3.8%	7.8%
1 Dec 2019	**Parties confirm their candidate lists. campaign officially begins**																

Date	Polling firm	Sample size	Smer	SaS	OĽaNO (Note: OĽaNO runs a common list with NOVA under its name.)	SNS	Kotleba–ĽSNS	SR	Most–Híd	SIEŤ	KDH	SMK–MKP	PS	SPOLU	ZĽ	Vlasť	DV	Lead
19–25 Nov 2019	AKO	1000	18.4%	6.3%	7.6%	6.4%	10.4%	7.1%	3.5%		6.4%	2.2%	12.4%		12.5%	2.1%	3.2%	5.9%
9–13 Nov 2019	Polis	1021	20.2%	5.1%	7.0%	6.1%	11.1%	5.2%	4.1%		6.0%	3.6%	11.1%		11.2%	3.3%	2.4%	9.0%
30 Oct–6 Nov 2019	Focus	1020	20.0%	5.0%	5.7%	6.8%	10.3%	7.0%	4.1%		5.7%	3.5%	11.7%		10.6%	3.0%	2.9%	8.3%
15–22 Oct 2019	Focus	1021	22.0%	5.2%	6.0%	6.9%	10.2%	7.2%	3.8%		6.5%	3.2%	11.0%		9.1%	1.8%	2.4%	11.0%
7–10 Oct 2019	AKO	1000	20.1%	6.7%	5.8%	6.4%	12.3%	5.9%	3.9%		5.6%	3.1%	12.7%		12.0%		1.7%	7.4%
18–25 Sep 2019	AKO	NA	20%	7%	5.9%	5.6%	10.8%	7.8%	3.4%		7.4%	3.6%	17.1%		9.1%		2.0%	2.9%
11–17 Sep 2019	Focus	1,027	21.7%	6.4%	6.8%	6.8%	10.6%	7.2%	4.1%		6.9%	3.3%	13.3%		6.5%		2.1%	8.4 %
26–29 Aug 2019	AKO	NA	19.6%	9.0%	7.3%	7.1%	10.9%	7.6%	3.9%		6.3%	3.5%	15.5%		8.8%			4.1 %
12–20 Aug 2019	MVK	1,075	20.7%	5.5%	6.9%	8.5%	8.1%	5.5%	3.8%		9.4%	3.4%	13.3%		7.9%			7.4 %
13–19 Aug 2019	Focus	1,010	20.8%	7.9%	6.1%	7.0%	11.4%	6.6%	4.3%		7.3%	3.5%	14.9%		5.5%			5.9 %
1–7 Aug 2019	Focus	1,020	21.8%	7.0%	6.0%	7.0%	12.1%	6.3%	4.7%		7.5%	3.4%	14.0%		5.0%			7.8 %
19–25 Jun 2019	Focus	1,023	20.3%	7.1%	5.1%	7.3%	12.6%	7.0%	4.5%		7.0%	3.3%	15.7%		5.2%			4.6 %
11–18 Jun 2019	Polis	1,165	18.3%	8.5%	6.3%	7.6%	11.4%	5.0%	5.1%		8.2%		15.0%		5.2%			3.3 %
1–11 Jun 2019	Focus	1,017	19.7%	8.0%	6.7%	7.2%	12.5%	7.3%	4.4%		7.5%	3.7%	17.8%					1.9 %
28–31 May 2019	AKO	1,000	18.7%	10.8%	6.3%	7.2%	14.9%	7.3%	4.2%		8.6%	2.9%	18.0%					0.7 %
25 May 2019	**2019 European Parliament election in Slovakia**																	
8–10 May 2019	AKO	1,000	19.2%	13.5%	6.7%	8.2%	13.6%	9.9%	5.1%		7.4%	2.2%	13.6%					5.6 %
29–6 Apr/May 2019	AKO	1,000	19.1%	13.1%	9.2%	8.0%	13.9%	8.3%	5.0%		6.6%	2.6%	13.7%					5.2%
8–14 Apr 2019	Focus	1,026	19.0%	10.1%	9.1%	7.5%	10.5%	9.4%	4.7%		6.8%	3.6%	13.4%					5.6%
1–2 Apr 2019	AKO	1,000	19.7%	12.9%	8.6%	7.6%	11.5%	10.7%	5.0%		6.9%	2.6%	14.4%					5.3%
16–30 Mar 2019	**Zuzana Čaputová wins 2019 Slovak presidential election**																	
18–25 Mar 2019	Focus	1,022	22.4%	11.4%	8.3%	7.9%	11.8%	9.0%	4.5%		7.5%	3.0%	9.1%					10.6%
21–26 Feb 2019	Focus	1,022	21.2%	11.2%	8.4%	7.5%	11.7%	9.5%	5.4%		6.5%	3.1%	9.5%					9.5%
8–12 Feb 2019	AKO	1,000	22.4%	14.8%	10.1%	8.0%	9.5%	10.9%	6.3%		6.1%	3.3%	7.5%					7.6%
16–23 Jan 2019	Focus	1,013	22.5%	12.3%	10.0%	8.0%	8.4%	10.4%	5.8%		7.0%	3.4%	4.9%	3.5%				10.2%
1–9 Dec 2018	Focus	1,019	21.7%	13.3%	10.5%	9.2%	9.2%	9.0%	5.2%		6.5%	3.3%	5.1%	4.1%				8.4%
27–28 Nov 2018	AKO	1,000	23.4%	15.9%	7.7%	9.3%	9.2%	10.0%	5.7%		6.7%	2.4%	5.3%	3.2%				7.5%
13–15 Nov 2018	AKO	1,000	23.9%	16.1%	8.1%	9.2%	7.8%	10.4%	6.1%		5.9%	3.2%	5.0%	4.2%				7.8%
7–14 Nov 2018	Focus	1,012	20.9%	12.0%	9.5%	8.0%	9.8%	8.1%	5.9%		7.7%	3.6%	5.3%	5.0%				8.9%
18–25 Sep 2018	Focus	1,015	22.4%	13.5%	10.3%	9.2%	10.0%	8.2%	5.1%		5.5%	3.1%	4.4%	3.1%				8.9%
30 Aug–5 Sep 2018	AKO	1,000	21.2%	16.0%	9.4%	10.9%	8.6%	9.5%	6.3%		7.6%	3.0%	4.6%	2.3%				5.2%
15–17 Aug 2018	AKO	1,000	21.4%	15.7%	8.4%	11.0%	10.9%	10.8%	5.3%		6.1%	3.0%	4.1%	3.3%				5.7%
2–9 Aug 2018	Focus	1,007	20.7%	12.2%	8.7%	9.4%	10.1%	10.0%	5.7%		7.1%	4.1%	4.2%	3.3%				8.5%
18–21 Jun 2018	AKO	1,000	21.0%	15.5%	8.6%	10.2%	11.1%	9.3%	6.3%		7.2%	2.4%	4.0%	3.8%				5.5%
4–11 Jun 2018	Focus	1,015	21.7%	12.4%	10.0%	9.8%	9.7%	8.1%	5.6%		6.7%	4.0%	3.9%	2.9%				9.3%
16–21 May 2018	AKO	1,000	21.5%	16.7%	9.1%	10.1%	10.4%	9.1%	5.6%		6.7%	2.5%	3.9%	3.6%				4.8%
24–30 Apr 2018	Focus	1,005	20.5%	13.2%	9.1%	10.1%	9.3%	9.1%	5.8%		6.8%	3.3%	3.6%	2.8%				7.3%
20–24 Apr 2018	AKO	1,000	21.4%	16.1%	8.7%	10.9%	10.3%	9.0%	6.8%		6.9%	1.9%	3.8%	3.7%				5.3%
4–7 Apr 2018	AKO	1,000	20.7%	17.1%	9.1%	10.7%	10.0%	8.6%	5.6%		8.6%	2.7%	3.2%	2.8%				3.6%
14–22 Mar 2018	**Robert Fico resigns as Prime Minister, Peter Pellegrini is elected as replacement, end of government crisis**																	
7–13 Mar 2018	Focus	1,012	20.2%	14.0%	10.4%	10.0%	10.1%	10.4%	5.6%		7.0%	4.1%	1.4%	1.1%				6.2%
21 Feb 2018	**Murder of Ján Kuciak, start of government crisis**																	
21–26 Feb 2018	AKO	1,000	24.7%	16.2%	10.2%	9.9%	8.2%	9.6%	6.3%		7.7%	3.4%	1.6%	1.6%				8.5%
23–28 Jan 2018	Focus	1,012	25.5%	13.1%	11.4%	8.6%	8.1%	9.0%	5.7%		7.4%	3.9%	1.9%	—N/a				12.4%
14–18 Nov 2017	AKO	1,000	24.8%	17.8%	12.5%	8.9%	8.4%	9.2%	5.8%	0.5%	7.0%	4.3%						7.0%
7–13 Nov 2017	Focus	1,017	24.8%	14.2%	12.5%	8.0%	8.4%	8.5%	5.6%	0.0%	7.2%	3.6%						10.6%
4–11 Oct 2017	Focus	1,003	26.2%	13.8%	8.5%	8.1%	10.1%	9.4%	6.0%	0.0%	7.3%	4.2%						12.4%
18–20 Sep 2017	AKO	1,000	27.3%	16.1%	8.9%	9.0%	10.9%	9.2%	7.3%	0.0%	5.1%	4.2%						11.2%
11–18 Sep 2017	Focus	1,000	26.0%	14.0%	9.6%	8.7%	10.4%	9.1%	6.0%	0.0%	6.4%	4.0%						12.0%
21–23 Aug 2017	AKO	1,000	25.0%	18.1%	8.9%	9.1%	11.0%	9.4%	7.5%	0.0%	6.0%	3.9%						6.9%
18–23 Aug 2017	Polis	1,220	27.3%	16.8%	9.0%	7.2%	14.2%	7.2%	5.2%	0.0%	5.5%	4.2%						10.5%
18–24 Jul 2017	Polis	1,208	27.8%	15.8%	9.4%	9.5%	11.2%	6.4%	5.5%	0.0%	6.0%	4.7%						12.0%
14–19 Jul 2017	AKO	1,000	25.8%	16.0%	9.2%	10.4%	10.3%	8.6%	7.6%	0.0%	6.8%	3.1%						9.8%
13–24 Jul 2017	Focus	1,025	26.4%	14.2%	9.2%	10.3%	9.1%	8.2%	6.2%	0.0%	6.3%	4.0%						12.2%
14–19 Jun 2017	AKO	1,000	26.0%	16.1%	10.0%	11.7%	9.7%	8.7%	7.0%	0.0%	6.0%	3.1%						9.9%
13–19 Jun 2017	Polis	1,208	28.0%	16.5%	9.1%	9.5%	11.8%	7.4%	5.2%	0.0%	6.0%	5.3%						11.5%
31 May – 4 Jun 2017	Focus	1,012	26.2%	13.4%	9.6%	10.2%	10.9%	7.4%	6.9%	0.6%	5.7%	4.0%						12.8%
13–19 May 2017	Polis	1,366	28.8%	16.0%	9.3%	9.3%	11.1%	6.8%	5.2%	0.0%	6.2%	4.7%						12.8%
24–26 Apr 2017	AKO	1,000	27.1%	17.6%	8.9%	11.4%	10.5%	7.1%	6.4%	0.6%	6.2%	3.5%						9.5%
20–25 Apr 2017	Polis	1,353	27.8%	14.7%	11.7%	9.8%	11.9%	7.0%	5.3%	0.6%	5.2%	5.1%						13.1%
4–9 Apr 2017	Focus	1,006	26.6%	13.7%	9.2%	9.9%	10.1%	8.1%	6.9%	0.6%	5.4%	4.3%						12.9%
11–17 Mar 2017	Polis	1,209	27.5%	14.5%	12.2%	10.3%	12.2%	7.0%	5.4%	1.0%	5.5%	3.4%						13.0%
13–15 Mar 2017	AKO	1,000	28.0%	17.4%	9.1%	11.3%	11.0%	6.6%	7.5%	1.0%	5.1%	2.2%						10.6%
18–25 Feb 2017	Polis	1,311	27.1%	13.8%	12.1%	9.0%	13.0%	8.1%	5.4%	1.0%	5.4%	3.3%						13.3%
6–18 Feb 2017	Focus	1,512	25.5%	13.8%	9.7%	10.1%	10.4%	8.5%	6.0%	1.0%	5.5%	4.3%						11.7%
10–14 Feb 2017	AKO	1,000	27.7%	16.3%	9.1%	11.4%	10.5%	6.6%	8.1%	1.0%	5.6%	2.9%						11.4%
21–27 Jan 2017	Focus	1,008	27.9%	13.2%	10.2%	10.1%	10.2%	7.4%	6.4%	1.0%	5.3%	3.4%						14.7%
14–20 Jan 2017	Polis	1,359	27.4%	13.2%	12.2%	10.0%	11.1%	7.4%	5.6%	1.0%	5.9%	4.4%						14.2%
2–10 Jan 2017	AKO	1,000	27.7%	13.1%	8.7%	12.7%	11.5%	7.7%	6.1%	1.2%	7.1%	3.2%						14.6%
11–20 Dec 2016	Polis	1,275	27.7%	15.9%	9.5%	10.6%	11.0%	7.7%	6.0%	1.0%	5.5%	4.0%						11.8%
2–9 Dec 2016	AKO	1,000	26.8%	15.8%	8.0%	14.1%	10.1%	8.4%	7.0%	1.1%	5.5%	2.9%						11.0%
23–29 Nov 2016	Focus	1,008	23.3%	13.6%	8.2%	13.7%	8.8%	7.9%	6.8%	1.2%	5.9%	4.4%						9.6%
3–10 Nov 2016	AKO	1,000	27.5%	15.4%	8.9%	14.4%	10.0%	6.9%	6.1%	1.2%	5.6%	3.5%						12.1%
28 Oct – 7 Nov 2016	Focus	1,020	26.9%	12.1%	8.0%	12.8%	8.4%	7.5%	6.7%	1.6%	6.3%	3.9%						13.1%
17–22 Oct 2016	AKO	1,000	27.5%	17.7%	6.4%	15.4%	8.7%	6.2%	7.2%	0.7%	5.9%	3.7%						9.8%
15–22 Oct 2016	Polis	1,409	27.1%	14.0%	8.5%	14.0%	10.1%	6.8%	8.2%	0.5%	4.6%	3.9%						13.1%
12–20 Sep 2016	AKO	1,000	29.6%	17.5%	9.5%	13.1%	11.1%	4.3%	5.8%	0.8%	4.2%	2.6%						12.1%
8–14 Sep 2016	Focus	1,009	27.7%	13.5%	8.2%	12.6%	8.3%	6.8%	7.7%	1.4%	6.0%	3.6%						14.2%
11–16 Aug 2016	Focus	1,002	27.0%	13.7%	9.7%	14.0%	8.9%	6.9%	6.1%	1.4%	4.6%	3.6%						13.0%
22–28 Jul 2016	AKO	1,000	29.9%	17.1%	7.0%	14.0%	11.6%	5.0%	6.3%	1.0%	4.1%	2.8%						12.8%
25 Jun – 1 Jul 2016	Polis	1,433	26.2%	16.6%	9.0%	13.5%	10.7%	4.8%	5.4%	1.1%	5.1%	4.5%						9.6%
14–20 Jun 2016	Focus	1,003	26.4%	14.1%	9.9%	14.5%	8.4%	6.9%	5.9%	1.4%	4.8%	3.5%						11.9%
4–11 May 2016	AKO	1,000	29.8%	16.2%	7.1%	12.4%	11.7%	5.8%	7.1%	1.8%	4.2%	3.4%						13.6%
3–9 May 2016	Focus	1,003	28.7%	13.0%	8.8%	11.2%	8.9%	5.9%	6.0%	3.5%	4.3%	4.0%						15.7%
22–29 Apr 2016	Polis	1,502	30.7%	14.5%	9.5%	12.2%	9.8%	4.2%	6.0%	2.0%	3.9%	4.2%						16.2%
4–7 Apr 2016	AKO	1,000	28.8%	16.2%	6.9%	13.7%	10.9%	5.4%	6.5%	1.8%	4.4%	3.8%						12.6%
11–16 Mar 2016	Focus	1,023	27.5%	12.5%	10.0%	11.1%	8.8%	7.8%	5.9%	3.6%	4.1%	4.3%						15.0%
10–14 Mar 2016	Polis	1,096	30.0%	15.9%	11.0%	11.9%	9.5%	4.4%	5.3%	2.3%	3.9%	4.7%						14.1%
**5 Mar 2016**	**2016 elections**		28.3%	**12.1%**	**11.0%**	**8.6%**	**8.0%**	**6.6%**	**6.5%**	**5.6%**	**4.9%**	**4.1%**						**16.2%**

== Seat projections ==
Date	Polling firm	Smer	SaS	OĽaNO (Note: OĽaNO runs a common list with NOVA, Kresťanská únia, and ZMENA ZDOLA under its name.)	SNS	Kotlebovci–ĽSNS	SR	Most–Híd	KDH	MKÖ–MKS	PS	SPOLU	ZĽ	Gov.	Opp.
20–24 Feb 2020	Focus+AKO	31	14	39	0	20	14	0	0	0	19		13	31	119
13–18 Feb 2020	Focus+AKO	32	11	31	0	19	15	0	10	0	17		15	32	118
6–12 Feb 2020	Focus	33	10	25	0	23	15	0	10	0	18		16	33	117
24–31 Jan 2020	MVK	41	0	17	11	24	12	0	14	0	15		16	52	98
15–22 Jan 2020	Focus	32	10	16	9	23	14	0	10	0	17		19	41	109
10–14 Jan 2020	Focus	33	9	14	9	24	13	0	11	0	19		18	42	108
7–11 Dec 2019	Polis	29	8	16	11	20	9	8	10	8	15		16	48	102
2–9 Dec 2019	Focus	36	10	14	10	21	13	0	10	0	19		17	46	104
1 Dec 2019	Parties confirm their candidate lists, campaign officially begins														

Date	Polling firm	Smer	SaS	OĽaNO (Note: OĽaNO runs a common list with NOVA under its name.)	SNS	Kotleba–ĽSNS	SR	Most–Híd	SIEŤ	KDH	SMK–MKP	PS	SPOLU	ZĽ	Gov.	Opp.
19–25 Nov 2019	AKO	32	11	13	11	18	12	0		11	0	21		21	43	107
15–22 Oct 2019	Focus	39	9	11	12	18	13	0		12	0	20		16	51	99
26–29 Aug 2019	AKO	32	15	12	12	18	12	0		10	0	25		14	44	106
12–20 Aug 2019	MVK	36	10	12	15	14	10	0		16	0	23		14	51	99
13–19 Aug 2019	Focus	36	14	10	12	20	11	0		12	0	26		9	48	102
1–7 Aug 2019	Focus	38	12	10	12	21	11	0		13	0	24		9	50	100
19–25 Jun 2019	Focus	35	12	9	12	22	12	0		12	0	27		9	47	103
11–18 Jun 2019	Polis	30	14	10	8	19	14	8		13	0	25		9	51	99
1–11 Jun 2019	Focus	34	14	11	12	22	13	0		13	0	31			46	104
28–31 May 2019	AKO	31	18	10	12	24	12	0		14	0	29			43	107
29 Apr – 6 May 2019	AKO	30	20	14	12	22	13	8		10	0	21			50	100
8–14 Apr 2019	Focus	33	18	16	13	18	17	0		12	0	23			46	104
1–2 Apr 2019	AKO	30	20	13	12	18	16	8		11	0	22			50	100
18–25 Mar 2019	Focus	39	20	14	13	20	15	0		13	0	16			52	98
21–26 Feb 2019	Focus	35	18	14	12	19	16	9		11	0	16			56	94
8–12 Feb 2019	AKO	35	23	16	13	15	17	10		10	0	11				
16–23 Jan 2019	Focus	40	22	18	14	15	19	10		12	0	0	0		64	86
1–9 Dec 2018	Focus	36	22	18	15	15	15	9		11	0	9	0		60	90
27–28 Nov 2018	AKO	38	26	12	15	15	16	9		11	0	8	0		62	88
13–15 Nov 2018	AKO	39	26	13	15	13	17	10		9	0	8	0		64	86
7–14 Nov 2018	Focus	34	20	16	13	16	13	10		12	0	8	8		57	93
Aug 2018	AKO	36	27	14	19	18	17	9		10	0	0	0		64	86
2–9 Aug 2018	Focus	37	22	15	17	18	18	10		13	0	0	0		64	86
18–21 Jun 2018	AKO	35	26	15	17	19	16	10		12	0	0	0		62	88
4–11 Jun 2018	Focus	39	22	18	18	17	14	10		12	0	0	0		67	83
16–21 May 2018	AKO	36	28	15	17	18	15	10		11	0	0	0		63	87
24–30 Apr 2018	Focus	37	24	16	18	17	16	10		12	0	0	0		65	85
20–24 Apr 2018	AKO	36	27	14	18	17	15	11		12	0	0	0		65	85
4–7 Apr 2018	AKO	34	29	15	18	17	14	9		14	0	0	0		61	89
7–13 Mar 2018	Focus	35	24	18	17	17	18	9		12	0	0	0		61	89
21–26 Feb 2018	AKO	40	26	17	16	13	16	10		12	0	0	0		66	84
23–28 Jan 2018	Focus	43	22	19	15	14	15	10		12	0	0	—N/a		68	82
14–18 Nov 2017	AKO	40	28	20	14	13	15	9	0	11	0				63	87
7–13 Nov 2017	Focus	42	24	21	14	14	14	9	0	12	0				65	85
4–11 Oct 2017	Focus	44	23	14	14	17	16	10	0	12	0				68	82
18–20 Sep 2017	AKO	44	26	14	14	17	15	12	0	8	0				70	80
11–18 Sep 2017	Focus	43	23	16	15	17	15	10	0	11	0				68	82
21–23 Aug 2017	AKO	40	29	14	14	17	15	12	0	9	0				66	84
18–23 Aug 2017	Polis	44	27	15	12	23	12	8	0	9	0				64	86
18–24 Jul 2017	Polis	46	26	15	16	18	10	9	0	10	0				71	79
14–19 Jul 2017	AKO	41	25	14	17	16	14	12	0	11	0				70	80
13–24 Jul 2017	Focus	44	24	15	17	15	14	10	0	11	0				71	79
14–19 Jun 2017	AKO	41	25	16	19	15	14	11	0	9	0				71	79
13–19 Jun 2017	Polis	43	25	14	14	18	11	8	0	9	9				65	85
31 May – 4 Jun 2017	Focus	44	22	16	17	18	12	12	0	9	0				73	77
13–19 May 2017	Polis	47	26	15	15	18	11	8	0	10	0				70	80
24–26 Apr 2017	AKO	43	28	14	18	16	11	10	0	10	0				71	79
20–25 Apr 2017	Polis	42	22	18	15	18	11	8	0	8	8				65	85
4–9 Apr 2017	Focus	45	23	15	17	17	13	11	0	9	0				73	77
11–17 Mar 2017	Polis	44	23	19	16	19	11	9	0	9	0				69	81
13–15 Mar 2017	AKO	44	27	14	18	17	8	12	0	8	0				74	76
18–25 Feb 2017	Polis	43	22	19	14	21	13	9	0	9	0				66	84
6–18 Feb 2017	Focus	43	23	16	17	18	14	10	0	9	0				70	80
10–14 Feb 2017	AKO	44	26	14	18	16	10	13	0	9	0				75	75
21–27 Jan 2017	Focus	46	22	17	17	17	12	10	0	9	0				73	77
14–20 Jan 2017	Polis	44	21	20	16	18	12	9	0	10	0				69	81
2–10 Jan 2017	AKO	44	21	14	20	18	12	10	0	11	0				74	76
11–20 Dec 2016	Polis	44	25	15	17	18	12	10	0	9	0				71	79
2–9 Dec 2016	AKO	42	25	13	22	16	13	11	0	8	0				75	75
23–29 Nov 2016	Focus	40	23	14	23	15	13	12	0	10	0				75	75
3–10 Nov 2016	AKO	44	24	14	23	16	11	9	0	9	0				76	74
28 Oct – 7 Nov 2016	Focus	46	20	13	22	14	13	11	0	11	0				79	71
17–22 Oct 2016	AKO	44	28	10	24	14	10	11	0	9	0				79	71
15–22 Oct 2016	Polis	46	24	14	24	17	11	14	0	0	0				84	66
12–20 Sep 2016	AKO	52	30	16	23	19	0	10	0	0	0				85	65
8–14 Sep 2016	Focus	46	22	13	21	14	11	13	0	10	0				80	70
11–16 Aug 2016	Focus	47	24	17	24	15	12	11	0	0	0				82	68
22–28 Jul 2016	AKO	50	28	12	23	19	8	10	0	0	0				83	67
25 Jun – 1 Jul 2016	Polis	45	29	16	23	19	0	9	0	9	0				77	73
14–20 Jun 2016	Focus	46	25	17	25	15	12	10	0	0	0				81	69
4–11 May 2016	AKO	50	27	12	21	19	9	12	0	0	0				83	67
3–9 May 2016	Focus	52	24	16	20	16	11	11	0	0	0				83	67
22–29 Apr 2016	Polis	56	26	17	22	18	0	11	0	0	0				89	61
4–7 Apr 2016	AKO	49	28	12	23	18	9	11	0	0	0				83	67
11–16 Mar 2016	Focus	50	22	18	20	16	14	10	0	0	0				80	70
10–14 Mar 2016	Polis	54	29	20	21	17	0	9	0	0	0				84	66
5 Mar 2016	2016 elections	49	21	19	15	14	11	11	10	0	0				81	69

== Special pollings ==
This section shows polls from Median, which conducts polling more on potential gains and less on seat projections. This section will also include special polling conducted only on certain age groups, half–way polls, meaning that they are not comparable to official polling because it doesn't include all groups of population.

Date	Polling firm	Sample size	Smer	SaS	OĽaNO	SNS	Kotleba–ĽSNS	SR	Most–Híd	SIEŤ	KDH	SMK–MKP	Lead
24 Jul – 20 Aug 2017	Median	1017	27.5%	15.5%	9.0%	11.5%	8.5%	6.0%	6.0%	1.0%	8.0%	4.5%	13.0%
15 May – 11 Jun 2017	Median	1017	28.5%	15.5%	10.5%	11.5%	8.0%	5.0%	6.0%	1.5%	6.5%	5.0%	14.0%
17 Apr – 14 May 2017	Median	1078	28.5%	14.5%	10.0%	11.5%	7.5%	6.5%	6.5%	2.0%	6.5%	4.5%	14.0%
20 Feb – 19 Mar 2017	Median	1018	27.0%	16.0%	10.0%	10.0%	9.0%	6.0%	7.0%	1.5%	6.5%	4.5%	11.0%
23 Jan – 19 Feb 2017	Median	1026	27.0%	15.5%	9.5%	10.0%	9.5%	6.5%	6.5%	2.0%	6.0%	4.5%	11.5%
1 Dec 16 – 22 Jan 17	Median	1058	25.0%	15.0%	10.5%	11.0%	8.0%	5.5%	7.5%	2.0%	7.0%	4.0%	10.0%
31 Oct – 27 Nov 2016	Median	1016	29.5%	15.0%	7.0%	11.0%	9.5%	5.0%	7.0%	2.0%	7.0%	4.0%	14.5%
Sep 2016	IVO with Focus	1,803 (Note: 18–39 year olds)	11.5%	23.4%	11.7%	10.5%	23.5%	7.6%	2.5%	0.5%	2.3%	1.6%	0.1%
19 Sep – 16 Oct 2016	Median	991	30.5%	14.5%	9.0%	11.0%	9.0%	4.5%	6.5%	2.0%	6.0%	4.0%	16.0%
22 Aug – 22 Sep 2016	Median	984	30.5%	15.0%	10.5%	12.5%	8.0%	3.5%	7.5%	2.0%	6.0%	3.5%	15.5%
25 Jul – 21 Aug 2016	Median	1,014	29.0%	16.0%	9.5%	12.5%	10.0%	3.0%	7.0%	2.5%	6.0%	3.0%	13.0%
Mar 2016	IVO with Focus	1,803	13.6%	18.1%	13.4%	10.5%	18.1%	7.6%	2.5%	0.5%	2.3%	1.6%	Tie
