= Lucia Kurilovská =

Slovak lawyer and politician

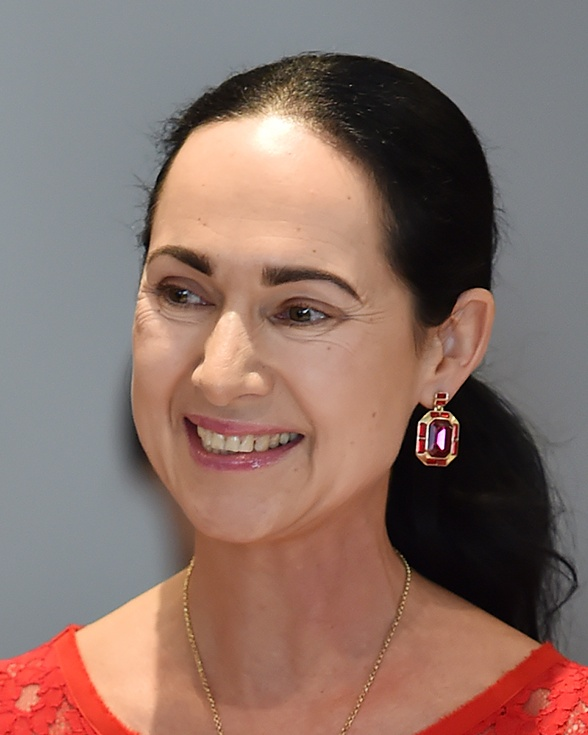
- Kurilovska in 2017

State Secretary at the Ministry of the Interior Affairs
- Incumbent
- Assumed office 25 October 2023

Personal details
- Born: 21 December 1967 (age 58) Poprad, Czechoslovakia
- Party: Good Choice (2019–2023); Voice – Social Democracy (2023–)
- Education: Comenius University

Lucia Kurilovská (born 21 December 1967) is a Slovak lawyer, academic and politician. She currently serves as the State Secretary at the Ministry of the Interior Affairs.

== Education and academic career ==
Kurilovská was born on 21 December 1967 in Poprad. She studied law at the Comenius University. After graduation, she became a member of the faculty at the university, and as of 2023 she still teaches criminal law at the Comenius University. She also works as a researcher at the Slovak Academy of Sciences.

Since 2014, she has served as a rector of the Police Academy in Bratislava. She was nominated by the Interior Minister Robert Kaliňák and initially rejected by the president Ivan Gašparovič, who criticized her relative lack of experience.

In 2019, she unsuccessfully ran for the position of Justice of the Constitutional Court of Slovakia. She withdrew her candidacy after she became convinced of not receiving sufficient support due to "overthinking and conspiracy theories" due to a "campaign of certain NGOs" against Kurilovská.

In March 2023, the opposition demanded Kurilovská's resignation after a serious injury suffered by a student of the academy during a shooting practice. The female student was accidentally shot by staff member Vladimir Šeparnev, a Russian national with no qualification to lead such a practice. According to critics, Kurilovská was responsible for a serious violation of safety rules and for allowing Šeparnev, an alleged former Spetsnaz member to lead such an exercise in the first place.

== Political career ==
In 2019, Kurilovská joined the Good Choice, which failed to pass the representation threshold in 2020 Slovak parliamentary election. In July 2023, Kurilovská joined the Voice – Social Democracy party, with which Good Choice eventually merged. After the 2023 Slovak parliamentary election she became the State Secretary at the Ministry of Interior Affairs.
