= Radovan Sloboda =

Radovan Sloboda may refer to:

- Radovan Sloboda (ice hockey) (born 1982), Slovak professional ice hockey player
- Radovan Sloboda (politician) (born 1966), Slovak politician and sport administrator
