= 2023 elections in the European Union =

- 2023

The 2023 elections in the European Union included national and regional elections in the EU member states.

== National elections ==
=== Parliamentary elections ===
Member state	Election	Parliament before	Head of Government before	Party	EU Party	Parliament after	Head of Government after	Party	EU Party
Estonia	5 March		Kaja Kallas	Reform	ALDE		Kaja Kallas	Reform	ALDE
Bulgaria	2 April		Galab Donev (caretaker)	Ind.	Ind.		Nikolai Denkov	PP	Ind. (Note: Renew Europe-affiliated)
Finland	2 April		Sanna Marin	SDP	PES		Petteri Orpo	National Coalition	EPP
Greece	21 May		Kyriakos Mitsotakis	ND	EPP		Ioannis Sarmas (caretaker)	Ind.	Ind.
Netherlands (senate only)	30 May		Mark Rutte	VVD	ALDE		Mark Rutte	VVD	ALDE
Greece	25 June		Ioannis Sarmas (caretaker)	Ind.	Ind.		Kyriakos Mitsotakis	ND	EPP
Spain	23 July		Pedro Sánchez	PSOE	PES		Pedro Sánchez	PSOE	PES
Slovakia	30 September		Ľudovít Ódor	Ind.	Ind.		Robert Fico	Smer	PES (suspended)
Luxembourg	8 October		Xavier Bettel	DP	ALDE		Luc Frieden	CSV	EPP
Poland	15 October		Mateusz Morawiecki	PiS	ECR		Donald Tusk	PO	EPP
Netherlands	22 November		Mark Rutte	VVD	ALDE		Dick Schoof	Ind.	Ind.

Some parts in France were also held Senate election.

=== Presidential elections ===
Member state	Election	President before	Party	EU Party	President after	Party	EU Party
Cyprus	5 February; 12 February	Nicos Anastasiades	DISY	EPP	Nikos Christodoulides	Ind. (Note: Democratic Rally until 2023)	Ind. (Note: EPP until 2023)

=== Presidential elections in parliamentary states ===
Member state	Election	President before	Party	EU Party	President after	Party	EU Party
Czech Republic	13–14 January; 27–28 January	Miloš Zeman	SPO	Ind. (Note: Didn't belong to any European party.)	Petr Pavel	Ind.	Ind.
Latvia	31 May	Egils Levits	Ind.	Ind.	Edgars Rinkēvičs	Unity	EPP

== Referendums ==
- 2023 Slovak constitutional referendum, 21 January
- 2023 Polish referendum, 15 October

== Regional elections ==
=== Austria ===
- 2023 Lower Austrian state election, 29 January
- 2023 Carinthian state election, 5 March
- 2023 Salzburg state election, 23 April

=== Finland ===
- 2023 Ålandic legislative election, 15 October

=== Germany ===
- 2023 Berlin state election, 12 February
- 2023 Bremen state election, 14 May
- 2023 Bavarian state election, 8 October
- 2023 Hessian state election, 8 October

=== Greece ===
All thirteen regions held elections 8 and 15 October.

=== Italy ===
Five regions held elections in February, April, June and October.

=== Netherlands ===
All twelve provinces held elections on 15 March, also indirectly determining the composition of the Senate.

=== Portugal ===
- 2023 Madeiran regional election, 24 September

=== Spain ===
Twelve autonomous communities held elections on 28 May.
