= 2023 Slovak constitutional referendum =

- 21 January 2023
- Do you agree that the early termination of the election period of the National Council of the Slovak Republic can be carried out by a referendum or a resolution of the National Council of the Slovak Republic, namely by changing the Constitution of the Slovak Republic?
- Outcome: Proposal failed as voter turnout was below 50%

Results
Choice	Votes	%
Yes	1,163,586	98.44%
No	18,398	1.56%
Valid votes	1,181,984	99.14%
Invalid or blank votes	10,265	0.86%
Total votes	1,192,249	100.00%
Registered voters/turnout	4,377,565	27.24%
- Results of the "yes" vote as a percentage of registered voters by district

A constitutional referendum was held in Slovakia on 21 January 2023. Following the 2020 parliamentary election, in which the Direction – Slovak Social Democracy (SMER) was defeated by the Ordinary People and Independent Personalities (OĽaNO), opposition parties initiated a referendum to call a snap election.

The proposed referendum was rejected by the Constitutional Court of Slovakia in 2021, although the organisers submitted another proposal in August 2022. The organisers wanted to propose two questions, one that would ask for the modification of the National Council to call a snap election and one that would ask for the resignation of Eduard Heger's government; the Court ruled that the latter question is unconstitutional, but approved the first one. Subsequently, Zuzana Čaputová, the president of Slovakia, announced the date of the referendum, while Heger voiced his opposition to such referendum.

Although a very large majority of those that voted supported the proposal, it nevertheless was not adopted as less than 50% of all eligible voters in the country exercised their right to vote in the referendum, a requirement under current Slovak law.

== Background ==
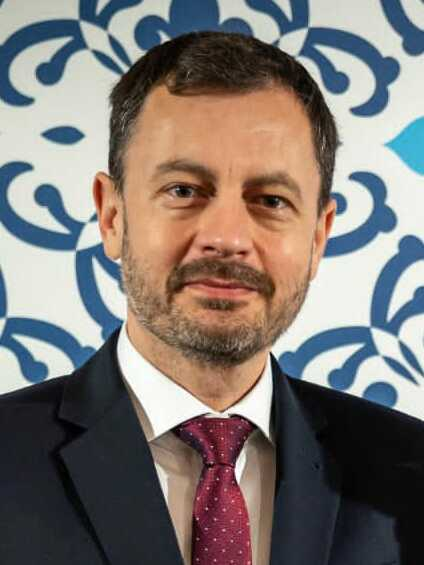
Eduard Heger has served as prime minister of Slovakia since 2021

The constitutional referendum comes in context of repeated attempts by the Direction – Slovak Social Democracy (SMER) to call for early elections. Following the murder of Ján Kuciak in 2018, the Ordinary People and Independent Personalities (OĽaNO) topped the polls and defeated SMER in the 2020 parliamentary election. Igor Matovič, the leader of OĽaNO, replaced Peter Pellegrini as prime minister of Slovakia and headed a coalition government with We Are Family (SR), Freedom and Solidarity (SaS), and For the People (ZĽ).

Following a political crisis in March 2021 that was caused when Matovič announced the purchase of Sputnik V COVID-19 vaccines, without obtaining the approval of his coalition partners, Matovič was forced to step down as prime minister and was replaced by Eduard Heger. OĽaNO, SR, SaS, and ZĽ continued their cooperation, although SaS left the government in September 2022 due to their differences on economic policy. Heger's government faced a motion of no confidence in December 2022, which successfully passed. Richard Sulík, the leader of SaS, stated that he would be in favour of forming a new government, while president of Slovakia, Zuzana Čaputová, stated that Heger would continue serving as caretaker head of government. This gave the opportunity for members of parliament to modify the constitution to organise early elections, and if failing to do so, a new government will have to be formed.

== Conduct ==
Voters without permanent residence in Slovakia and voters with permanent residence in Slovakia who would not be in Slovakia on the day of the referendum will be able to vote in the referendum. Additionally, citizens that are in quarantine will be able to vote. Approval of a referendum in Slovakia requires a double majority: over 50% of registered voters must participate, and a majority of those voters participating.

== Proposed changes ==
At the beginning of 2021, SMER, Voice – Social Democracy (HLAS), Slovak National Party (SNS), and Socialisti.sk voiced support for a popular initiative referendum to call a snap election. They submitted 585,000 signatures to Čaputová shortly before the resignation of Matovič as prime minister. The proposed question was ruled by the Constitutional Court of Slovakia as "a violation of general constitutional rules" and indicated that the referendum should be constitutional, as the proposed referendum would amend the constitution. A new collection of signatures was organised in August 2022; 406,000 signatures in total were submitted. This time, the organisers proposed two questions, one that would ask for the modification of the National Council to call a snap election and the other that would ask for the resignation of Heger's government. Čaputová decided to submit an initiative to the Constitutional Court regarding the second question, which led to criticism from the opposition. The Constitutional Court later ruled the second question as unconstitutional, while Čaputová announced that the referendum would be held on 21 January 2023. Heger stated that "snap elections have no place in a democracy".

=== Question ===
The question on the referendum paper was posed as:

Súhlasíte s tým, že predčasné skončenie volebného obdobia Národnej rady Slovenskej republiky je možné uskutočniť referendom alebo uznesením Národnej rady Slovenskej republiky, a to zmenou Ústavy Slovenskej republiky?
"Do you agree that the early termination of the election period of the National Council of the Slovak Republic can be carried out by a referendum or a resolution of the National Council of the Slovak Republic, namely by changing the Constitution of the Slovak Republic?"

== Reception ==
=== Opinion polls ===
Focus conducted an opinion poll in June 2021 in which 52.9% of the voters that they would turn out to vote in a potential referendum, while 33.7% stated that they would not. In November 2022, AKO conducted an opinion poll in which 54.2% of the voters stated that they would turn out to vote in the referendum, while 38.9% of the voters stated that they would not.

Polling organization	Date	Yes	No	Don't know	Lead
AKO	8–16 November 2021	63.1	34.2	2.7	28.9

=== Overall positions ===
Position	Name	Ideology	Ref
Yes	Direction – Social Democracy (SMER–SD)	Social democracy	
Yes	Voice – Social Democracy (HLAS–SD)	Social democracy	
Yes	Republic	Neo-fascism	
Yes	Life – National Party (ŽIVOT)	Christian right	
Yes	Slovak Patriot (PATRIOT)	Slovak nationalism	
Yes	Slovak National Party (SNS)	Slovak nationalism	
Yes	Socialists.sk	Democratic socialism	
Yes	Communist Party of Slovakia (KSS)	Communism	
Yes	99% – Civic Voice (99%)	Left-wing populism	
Yes	National Coalition / Independent Candidates (NK/NEKA)	Populism	
Yes	Slovak Revival Movement (SHO)	Neo-fascism	
Yes	Nation and Justice – Our Party (NaS)	Slovak nationalism	
Yes	Home – National Party (DOMOV–NS)	Slovak nationalism	
Boycott	Ordinary People and Independent Personalities (OĽaNO)	Conservatism	
Boycott	Freedom and Solidarity (SaS)	Liberalism	
Boycott	For the People (ZĽ)	Liberal conservatism	
Boycott	New Majority (NOVA)	Liberal conservatism	
Boycott	Change from Bottom (ZZ)	Liberal conservatism	
Boycott	Civic Conservative Party (OKS)	Liberal conservatism	
Boycott	Progressive Slovakia (PS)	Liberalism	
Boycott	Together – Civic Democracy (SPOLU)	Conservative liberalism	
Boycott	Good Choice and Moderates (DV)	Technocracy	
Boycott	Hungarian Forum (MF)	Minority politics	
Boycott	Civic Democrats of Slovakia (ODS)	Conservative liberalism	
Boycott	Chance (ŠANCA)	Liberal conservatism	
Boycott	Democrats of Slovakia (DS)	Conservative liberalism	
Neutral	We Are Family (SR)	Right-wing populism	
Neutral	People's Party Our Slovakia (ĽSNS)	Neo-Nazism	(Note: ĽSNS did not make its announcement.)
Neutral	Christian Democratic Movement (KDH)	Christian democracy	
Neutral	Alliance	Minority politics	
Neutral	HEART–Slovak National Unity–Party of Patriots (SRDCE–SNJ–sv)	Slovak nationalism	

== Results ==
Polling stations were opened from 07:00 (UTC+01:00) to 22:00. As only 27% of the electorate turned out to vote while a majority of votes and a minimum of 50% turnout was required to pass the proposal, the referendum failed.

Choice	Votes	%
For	1,163,586	98.44
Against	18,398	1.56
Total	1,181,984	100.00
Valid votes	1,181,984	99.14
Invalid/blank votes	10,265	0.86
Total votes	1,192,249	100.00
Registered voters/turnout	4,377,565	27.24
Source: Volby

== Aftermath ==
Just days following the failure of the referendum, the National Council voted on 25 January to amend the constitution to allow for snap elections if approved by a three-fifths majority in the council. It was agreed that the next parliamentary election would be held on 30 September 2023.

== Analysis ==
The Matej Bel Institute analysed the electoral behaviour of four national minorities in Slovakia. They observed significantly distinct electoral behaviour differing from the Slovak population. The institute's analysis showed that Rusyns turned out in higher proportions, 8–14 percentage points above the national average, while turnout amongst Gorals was around the national average with slight positive deviation (<1 percentage point). Meanwhile Hungarians and Roma turned out in significantly lower numbers (13–18 points below the national turnout), even when controlling for Hungarian–Roma communities concentrated in Gemer region. The analysis also concluded that minority populations could not be won over by a general national campaign.

== See also ==
- 2004 Slovak early parliamentary elections referendum
