= 2004 Slovak early parliamentary elections referendum =

Referendum in 2004

- 3 April 2004
- Are you in favor of the deputies of the National Council of the Slovak Republic adopting a constitutional law on shortening the third electoral period of the National Council of the Slovak Republic so that elections to the National Council of the Slovak Republic are held in 2004?

Results
Choice	Votes	%
Yes	1,305,023	87.91%
No	179,524	12.09%
Valid votes	1,484,547	98.81%
Invalid or blank votes	17,907	1.19%
Total votes	1,502,454	100.00%
Registered voters/turnout	4,193,347	35.83%

A referendum on holding early parliamentary elections was held in Slovakia on 3 April 2004. Although approved by 87.9% of those voting, voter turnout was just 35.9% and the referendum was declared invalid due to insufficient turnout.

== Results ==
Choice	Votes	%
For	1,305,023	87.9
Against	179,524	12.1
Invalid/blank votes	19,237	–
Total	1,503,784	100
Registered voters/turnout	4,193,347	35.9
Source: Nohlen & Stöver

== See also ==
- 2023 Slovak constitutional referendum
