= 2000 Slovak early parliamentary elections referendum =

11 November 2000
- Are you in favor of the National Council of the Slovak Republic passing a resolution on the constitutional law: The electoral period of the National Council of the Slovak Republic elected in 1998 will end on the day of the elections to the National Council of the Slovak Republic, which will be held within 150 days of the announcement of the referendum results?

Results
Choice	Votes	%
Yes	759,124	95.07%
No	39,363	4.93%
Valid votes	798,487	97.82%
Invalid or blank votes	17,767	2.18%
Total votes	816,254	100.00%
Registered voters/turnout	4,085,172	19.98%

A referendum on holding early parliamentary elections was held in Slovakia on 11 November 2000. Although approved by 95.1% of those voting, voter turnout was just 20% and the referendum was declared invalid due to insufficient turnout.

== Results ==
Choice	Votes	%
For	759,124	95.1
Against	39,363	4.9
Invalid/blank votes	17,767	–
Total	816,254	100
Registered voters/turnout	4,085,172	20.0
Source: Nohlen & Stöver
