= 2003 Slovak European Union membership referendum =

- 16 and 17 May 2003
- Do you agree with the Slovak Republic becoming a member state of the European Union?

Results
Choice	Votes	%
Yes	2,012,870	93.71%
No	135,031	6.29%
Valid votes	2,147,901	98.74%
Invalid or blank votes	27,488	1.26%
Total votes	2,175,389	100.00%
Registered voters/turnout	4,174,097	52.12%
- Results of the "yes" vote as a percentage of registered voters by district

A referendum on joining the European Union was held in Slovakia on 16 and 17 May 2003. It was approved by 93.7% of those voting, and Slovakia subsequently joined the EU on 1 May 2004. As of July 4th, 2026, it remains the only referendum in the country's history to have not failed due to insufficient voter turnout.

== Results ==
Choice	Votes	%
For	2,012,870	93.71
Against	135,031	6.29
Total	2,147,901	100.00
Valid votes	2,147,901	98.74
Invalid/blank votes	27,488	1.26
Total votes	2,175,389	100.00
Registered voters/turnout	4,174,097	52.12
Source: Nohlen & Stöver
