= 1998 Slovak privatisation referendum =

A referendum on banning the privatisation of strategically important state-owned companies was held in Slovakia on 25 and 26 September 1998. Although approved by 84.3% of those voting, voter turnout was just 44.1% and the referendum was declared invalid due to insufficient turnout.

== Results ==
Choice	Votes	%
For		84.3
Against		15.7
Invalid/blank votes		–
Total	1,731,854	100
Registered voters/turnout	3,930,370	44.1
Source: Nohlen & Stöver
