= 1994 Slovak disclosure referendum =

22 October 1994
- Do you agree to the adoption of a law on the proof of funds that were used in auctions and privatization?

Results
Choice	Votes	%
Yes	724,448	95.93%
No	30,733	4.07%
Valid votes	755,181	97.62%
Invalid or blank votes	18,443	2.38%
Total votes	773,624	100.00%
Registered voters/turnout	3,874,407	19.97%

A referendum on the retrospective disclosure of the financial details of large-scale privatisation was held in Slovakia on 22 October 1994. Although approved by 95.9% of those voting, voter turnout was just 20% and the referendum was declared invalid due to insufficient turnout.

== Question ==
Súhlasíte, aby sa prijal zákon o preukazovaní finančných prostriedkov, ktoré boli použité pri dražbách a privatizácii?

("Do you agree to a law on proof of funds used for auctioning and privatization?")

== Results ==
Choice	Votes	%
For	724,448	95.9
Against	30,733	4.1
Invalid/blank votes	18,443	–
Total	773,624	100
Registered voters/turnout	3,874,407	20.0
Source: Nohlen & Stöver
