= Radovan Sloboda (politician) =

Slovak politician

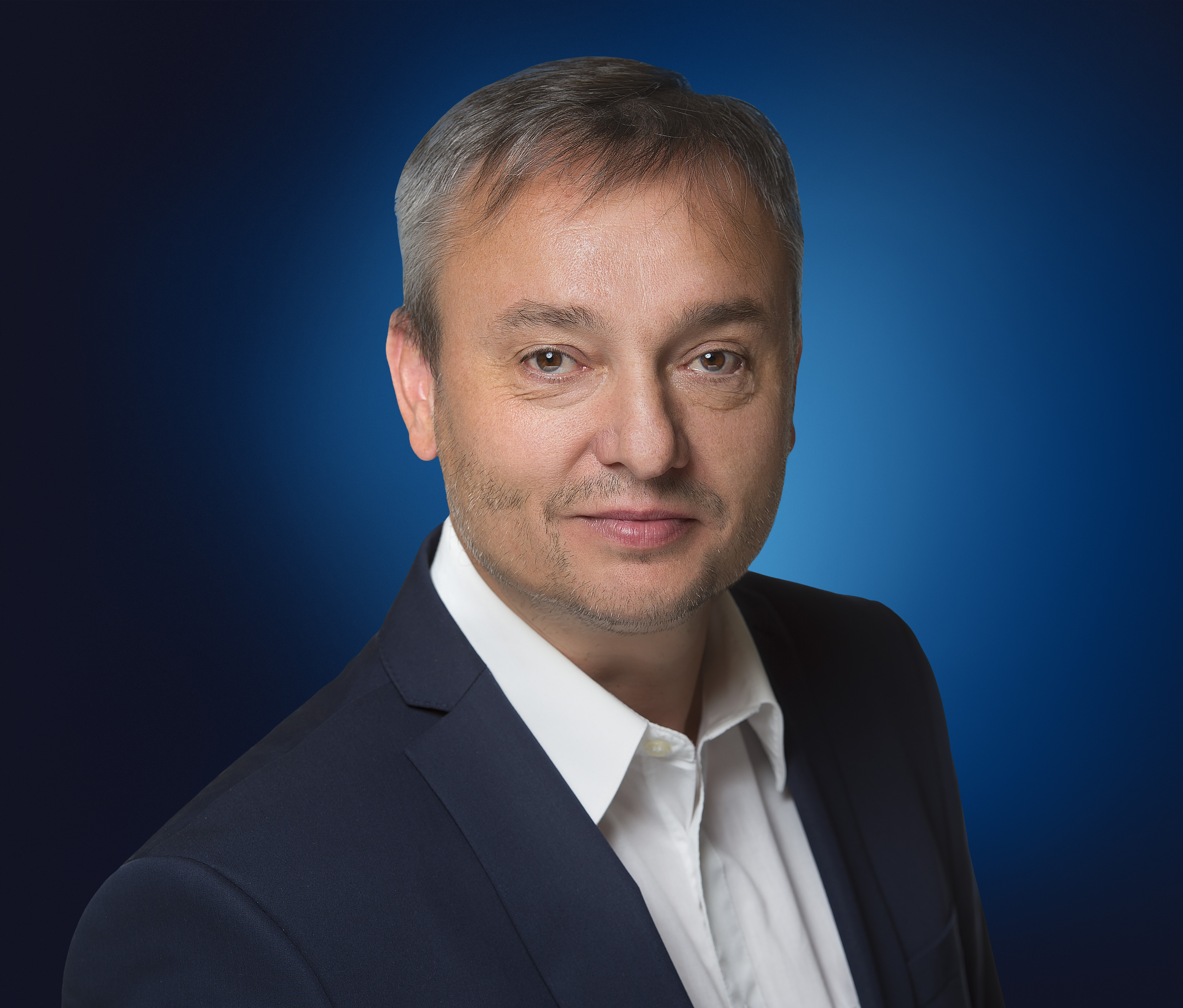
- Radovan Sloboda

Member of the National Council
- Incumbent
- Assumed office 2020
- President: Zuzana Čaputová
- Prime Minister: Igor Matovič

Personal details
- Born: 27 May 1966 (age 60) Banská Bystrica
- Party: Freedom and Solidarity
- Education: Prague University of Economics and Business
- Occupation: Politician
- Website: https://www.radovansloboda.sk/

Radovan Sloboda (27 May 1966 in Banská Bystrica) is a Slovak politician, an entrepreneur and a sports manager. He has been a Member of National Council of The Slovak Republic since 2020. He represents a political party, Freedom and Solidarity. He is also a member of Council of Slovak Tennis Association and the chairman of Tennis Club of Baseline Banská Bystrica.

== Early life ==
Radovan Sloboda was born in Teplice. He studied Economics of Transportation at the University of Economics in Prague. After having graduated from the university, he stayed and worked in Prague. Then he came back to the Slovak Republic and he started a business. He has been engaged in sports issues since 1999, he represents sports movement in National Council of The Slovak Republic. He also works as a member of Council of Slovak Tennis Association and he is also the chairman of Tennis Club of TC Baseline Banská Bystrica.

== Political career ==
Radovan Sloboda was elected as an MP of National Council of The Slovak Republic in the 2020 general election for the party Freedom and Solidarity. In National Council of The Slovak Republic he works as the vice-chairman of the Education, Science, Youth, Sport Committee. He is also a member of the Supervisory Committee of Slovak Information Service.

== Honors ==
Radovan Sloboda has received several awards in recognition of long-term work for Slovak sport. As the not playing captain he has gained three Slovak league medals. He received twice the Award of the Town "Sports Team of the Town Banská Bystrica" in recognition of a great development of sport. He has also got a memorial medal of Slovak Tennis Association for long-term work.
