= Homeland (Slovak political party) =

Slovak political party

Homeland VLASŤ
- Leader: Štefan Harabin
- Chairperson: Anna Žatková
- Founded: 28 November 2011; 14 years ago (DNES); 24 June 2019; 6 years ago (VLASŤ)
- Dissolved: 1 April 2021
- Headquarters: Vajnorská 1417/136, Bratislava-Nové Mesto
- Membership (2019): ▲832
- Ideology: National conservatism Slovak nationalism Right-wing populism Anti-immigration; Euroscepticism
- Political position: Right-wing to far-right
- Colours: Blue and red

Website
- https://stranavlast.sk

Homeland (Slovak: Vlasť) was a non-parliamentary political party in Slovakia.

== Party's names ==
- 28 November – 13 December 2011: TODAY (Slovak: DNES)
- 13 December 2011 – 27 September 2013: Civic Party TODAY (Slovak: Občianska strana DNES, DNES)
- 27 September 2013 – 24 June 2019: Civic Left Party (Slovak: Strana občianskej ľavice, SOĽ)
- From 24 June 2019: HOMELAND (Slovak: VLASŤ)

== History ==
As a juridical person, it was registered by the Ministry of the Interior of the Slovak Republic on 28 November 2011, under no. OVVS 3-2011 / 029917 and obtained the identification number of the organization 42257344. During its existence, there were three amendments to the Articles of Association (13 December 2011, 27 September 2013, 24 June 2019) and four changes to the statutory body (8 December 2011, 11 July 2012, August 11, 2017, October 3, 2019), with the general manager of the party, Ing. Anna Žatková.

At a press conference on October 1, 2019, former Minister of Justice (nominee of Mečiar's People's Party – Movement for a Democratic Slovakia) and Supreme Court Judge Štefan Harabin, a failed candidate in the 2019 presidential election, announced that he would run in the 2020 parliamentary election as leader of the political party Homeland.

19 year old Juraj Krajčík, son of party member Juraj Krajčík Senior began the largest hate crime of the country in Slovakia in 2022. The neo-fascist began a double murder of two gay men in Bratislava and bragged about the crime on Twitter and in the dark web forum "4chan". His father claimed his son was innocent.

== Some members or candidates of the party ==
- Štefan Harabin
- Roman Michelko
- Anna Žatkova
- Igor Čombor

== Election results ==
The party did not participate in the parliamentary elections held during its operation (2012, 2016; EP 2019), with the exception of the 2014 European Parliament election. The party received 1,311 votes (0.23%) and no mandate.

The only regional elections this party participated in were the 2017 regional elections. The party ran 15 candidates in Prešov Region, of which none were elected.

National Council
Election	Leader	Performance					Rank	Government
Election	Leader	Votes	%	± pp	Seats	+/–	Rank	Government
2020	Štefan Harabin	84,507	2.93%	New	0 / 150	New	12th	Extra-parliamentary (OĽaNO-SR-SaS-ZĽ)
2020	Štefan Harabin	84,507	2.93%	New	0 / 150	New	12th	Extra-parliamentary (OĽaNO-SR-ZĽ)

European Parliament
Election	Party leader	EU Party	Performance					Rank	EP Group
Election	Party leader	EU Party	Votes	%	± pp	Seats	+/–	Rank	EP Group
2014	Vladislav Borík	None	1,311	0.23%	New	0 / 14	New	26th	–
2019	Did not contest								

President
Election	Candidate	First round		Second round		Result
Election	Candidate	Votes	%	Votes	%	Result
2019	Endorsed Štefan Harabin	307,823	14.35%			Lost ✗

== See also ==
- List of political parties in Slovakia
