= Socialisti.sk =

Socialists.sk Socialisti.sk
- Abbreviation: S.sk
- Chairman: Artur Bekmatov
- Vice Chairmen: Milan Benkovský, Martin Štunda
- Honorary Chairman: Eduard Chmelár
- Founder: Eduard Chmelár
- Founded: 8 October 2019
- Registered: 52659071
- Split from: Communist Party of Slovakia (partly)
- Headquarters: Bajzova 234/12, 82108 Bratislava-Ružinov
- Ideology: Democratic socialism
- Political position: Left-wing
- Colours: Red and green
- Slogan: «Slovakia for all, not for the chosen» (Slovak: "Slovensko pre všetkých, nie pre vyvolených")
- National Council: 0 / 150
- European Parliament: 0 / 15

Website
- socialisti.sk

The Socialists.sk (Slovak: Socialisti.sk) are a non-parliamentary left-wing political movement in Slovakia, which was established by registration on October 8, 2019 at the Ministry of the Interior. The aim of the movement is to promote values based on social, environmental and peaceful pillars. It seeks to bring a radical, left-wing democratic alternative to what it perceives as predatory capitalism, which it argues destroys justice, equality and life on Earth. The current party leader is Artur Bekmatov.

== History ==
The movement was founded in October 2019 by left-wing activist and former presidential candidate, Eduard Chmelár. Socialisti.sk ran independently in the 2020 parliamentary election, but failed, gaining 0.55% of the vote. Subsequently, Chmelár resigned as chairman and in June 2020 the party assembly elected Artur Bekmatov as the new chairman, Chmelár remained the honorary chairman.

== Election results ==
=== National Council ===
Election	Leader	Votes	%	Seats	+/–	Government
2020	Eduard Chmelár	15,925	0.55 (#14)	0 / 150		Extra-parliamentary

=== European Parliament ===
Election	List leader	Votes	%	Rank	Seats	+/–	EP Group
2024	Artur Bekmatov	1,800	0.12%	16th	0 / 15	New	–

== Party leadership ==
=== Chairman ===
- 2019–2020 – Eduard Chmelár
- 2020–present – Artur Bekmatov
