= 2020 Slovak parliamentary election =

- 29 February 2020

All 150 seats in the National Council 76 seats needed for a majority
- Opinion polls
- Turnout: 65.75% (▲6.37pp)
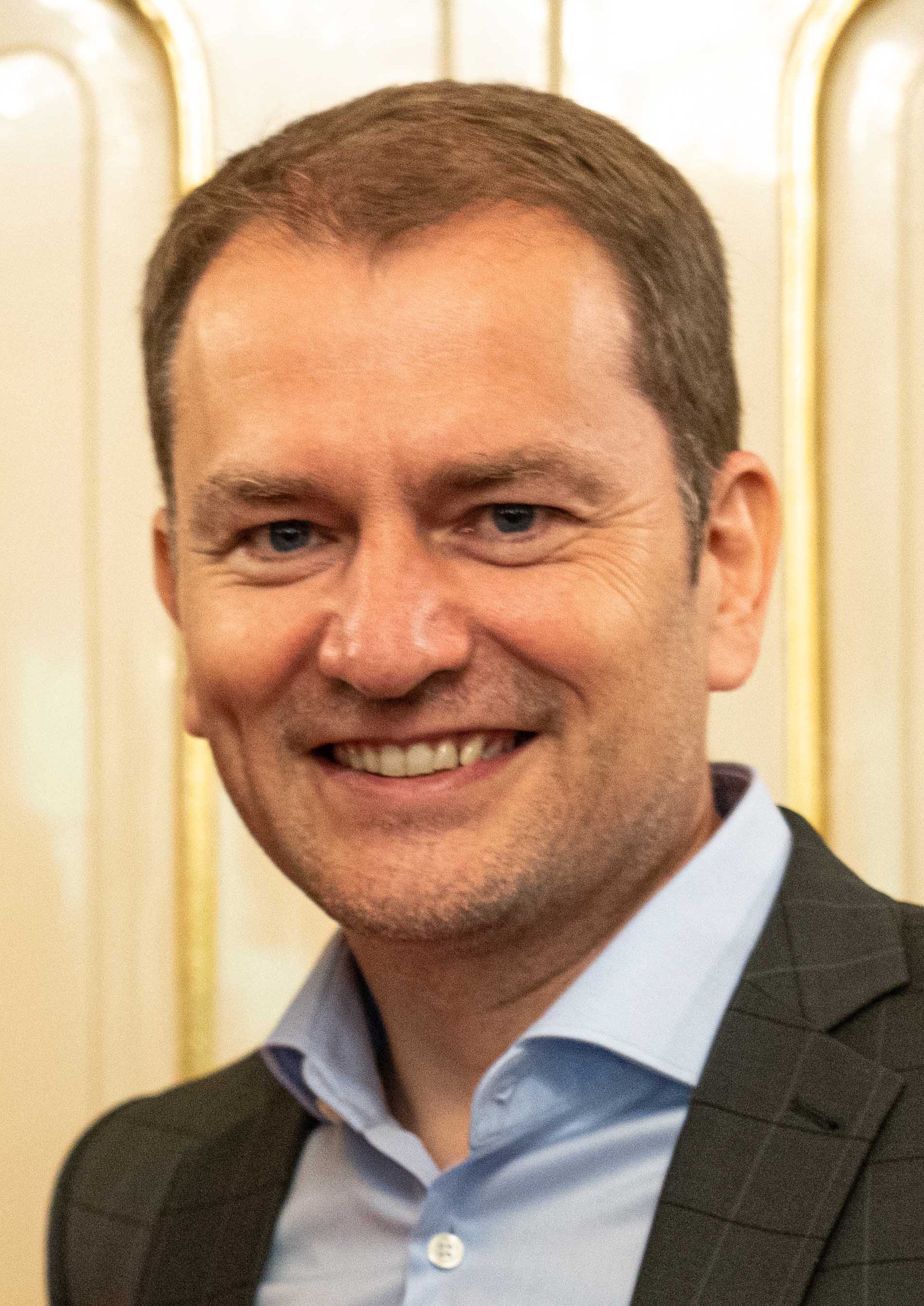

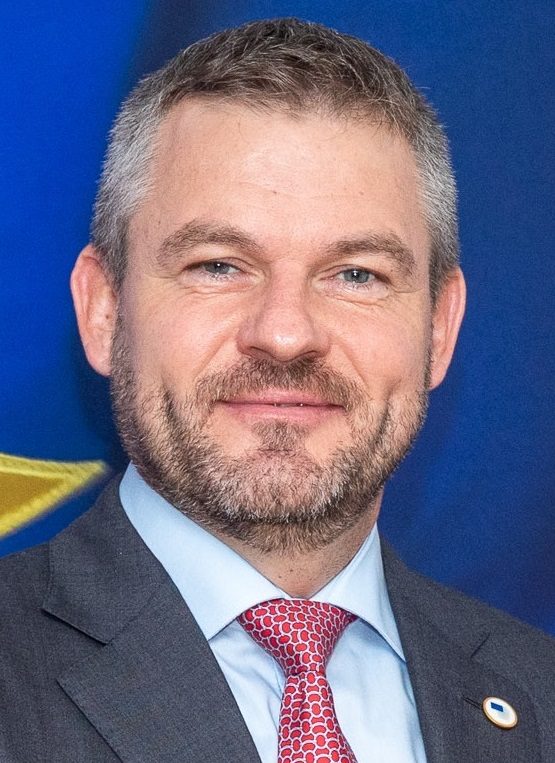

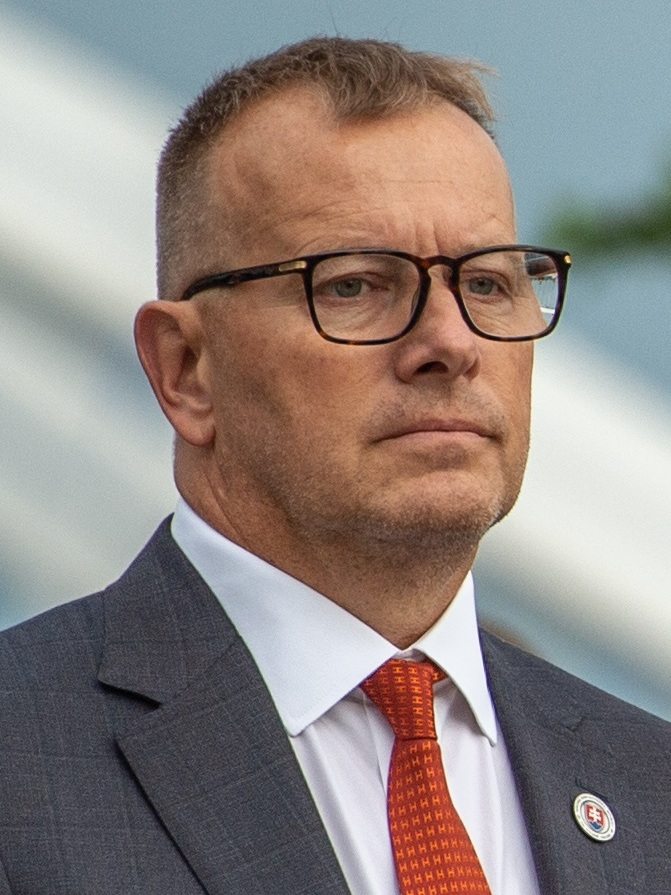

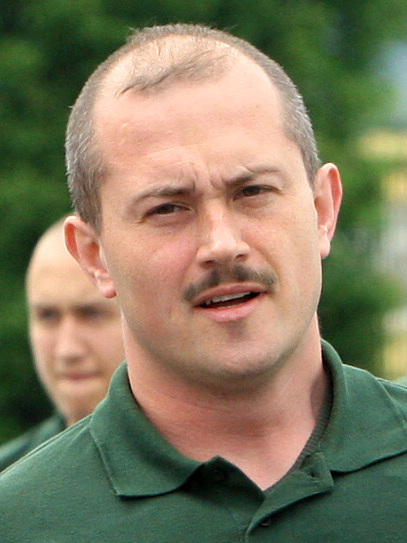

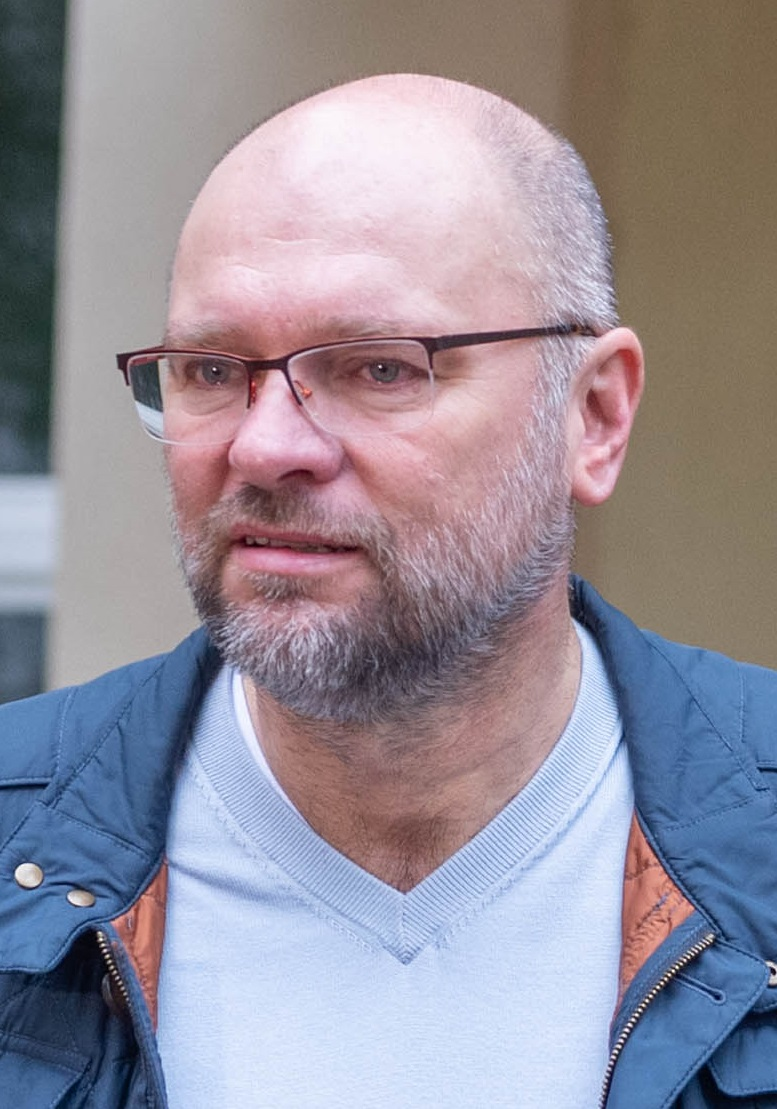

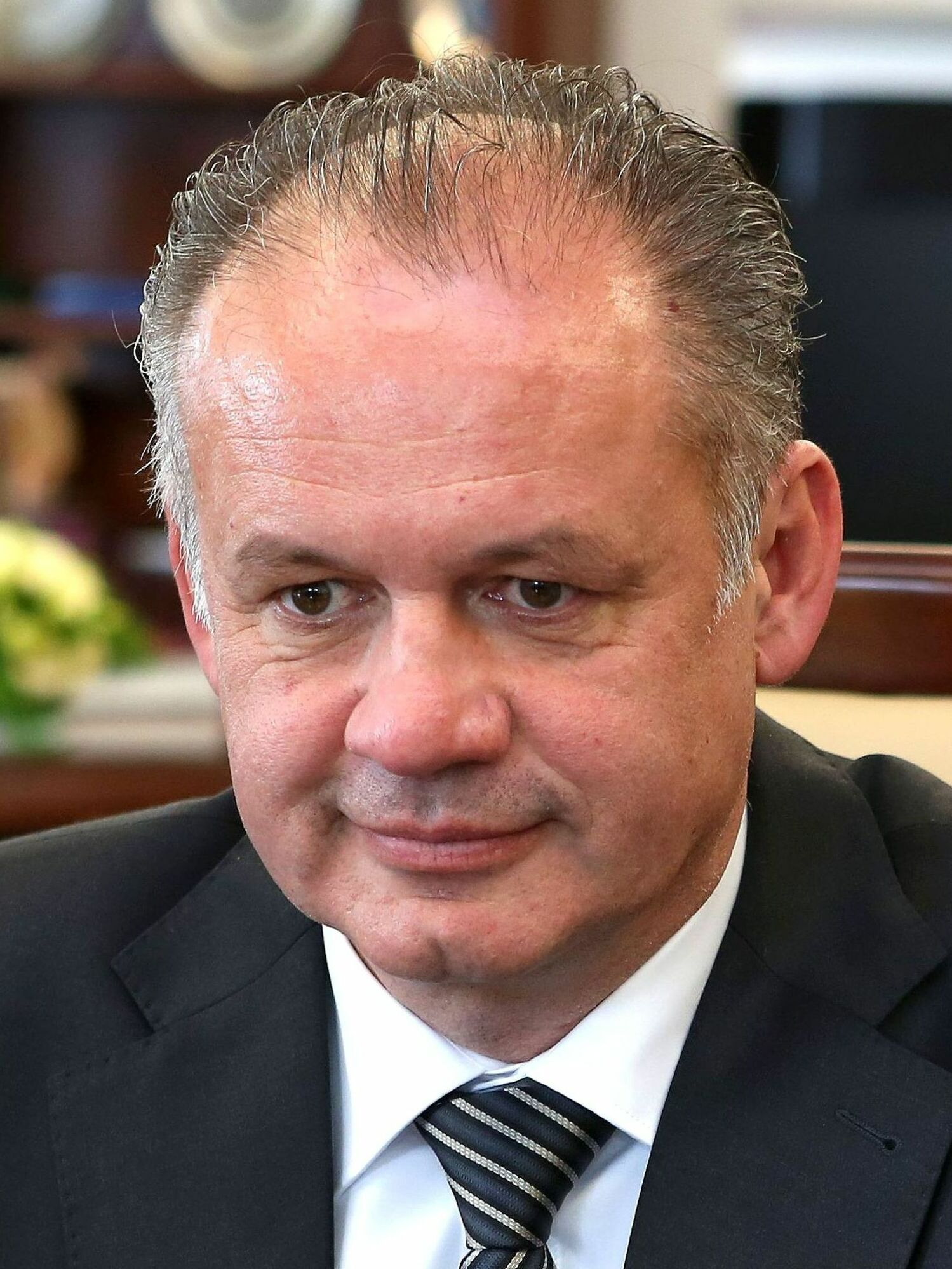
| | First party | Second party | Third party |
|---|---|---|---|
| Leader | Igor Matovič | Peter Pellegrini | Boris Kollár |
| Party | OĽaNO–NOVA–KÚ–ZZ | Smer | SR |
| Last election | 19 seats, 11.0% | 49 seats, 28.3% | 11 seats, 6.6% |
| Seats won | 53 | 38 | 17 |
| Seat change | ▲34 | ▼11 | ▲6 |
| Popular vote | 721,166 | 527,172 | 237,531 |
| Percentage | 25.0% | 18.3% | 8.2% |
| Swing | ▲14.0 pp | ▼10.0 pp | ▲1.6 pp |
| | Fourth party | Fifth party | Sixth party |
| Leader | Marian Kotleba | Richard Sulík | Andrej Kiska |
| Party | ĽSNS | SaS | ZĽ |
| Last election | 14 seats, 8.0% | 21 seats, 12.1% | Did not exist |
| Seats won | 17 | 13 | 12 |
| Seat change | ▲3 | ▼8 | New |
| Popular vote | 229,660 | 179,246 | 166,325 |
| Percentage | 8.0% | 6.2% | 5.8% |
| Swing | 0.0 pp | ▼5.9 pp | New |
- Results of the election, showing vote strength by district
Prime Minister before election
Peter Pellegrini
Smer
Elected Prime Minister
Igor Matovič
OĽaNO–NOVA–KÚ–ZZ

Parliamentary elections were held in Slovakia on 29 February 2020 to elect all 150 members of the National Council.

The populist Ordinary People and Independent Personalities–NOVA–Christian Union–Change from Below (OĽaNO–NOVA–KÚ–ZZ) party emerged as the largest parliamentary group, winning 53 seats. The ruling coalition comprising Direction – Social Democracy (Smer), the Slovak National Party (SNS), and Most–Híd, led by Prime Minister Peter Pellegrini of Smer, won only 38, with both the SNS and Most–Híd losing their parliamentary representation. It was the first time since the 2006 elections that Smer did not emerge as the party with the most seats. It was also the first election, in which no Hungarian minority party reached the 5% threshold.

As no party or electoral coalition won a majority of seats, a coalition government was needed. On 13 March, Matovič announced he had reached an agreement for a governing coalition with We Are Family, Freedom and Solidarity (SaS) and For the People, though they had not agreed upon a common governing program. On 21 March, President Zuzana Čaputová appointed Matovič's Cabinet.

== Background ==
SMER–SD won a plurality of seats in the 2016 election and formed a coalition government with national-conservative Slovak National Party, inter-ethnic Most–Híd, and liberal-conservative #Network. Incumbent Prime Minister Robert Fico remained in office.

The election term was characterized by a number of corruption scandals, growing political and societal tensions and an increase in the popularity of political extremism, which led to a gradual decline in the government's popularity. In March 2018, Peter Pellegrini took over the Prime Minister's office after the resignation of Robert Fico, as a result of mass anti-government protests triggered by the murder of investigative journalist Ján Kuciak.

The opposition's candidate Zuzana Čaputová won the 2019 presidential election by 17% ahead of the SMER-SD candidate Maroš Šefčovič in the second round. The 2019 European Parliament election in Slovakia was held on 25 May 2019. With a turnout of 22.7%, the election was won by the liberal coalition PS–SPOLU (20.1%), followed by SMER–SD (15.7%).

== Electoral system ==
The 150 members of the National Council were elected by proportional representation in a single nationwide constituency with an electoral threshold of 5% for single parties, 7% for coalitions of two or three parties, and 10% for coalitions of four or more parties. The election used the open list system, with seats allocated using the Hagenbach-Bischoff system. Voters were able to cast up to four preferential votes for candidates on the list of the party they voted for.

All participating parties must had register 90 days before election day and paid a deposit of €17,000, which would be refunded to all parties having gained at least 3% of the votes. All citizens of the Slovak Republic were allowed to vote except for convicted felons in prison (only those who were convicted for serious offences), people declared ineligible to perform legal acts by court, and citizens under 18 years of age. All citizens, who were 21 years of age or older on the election day and are permanent residents of Slovakia, were allowed to run as candidates except for prisoners, convicted felons, and those declared ineligible to perform legal acts by court.

Voters not present in their electoral district at the time of the elections were allowed to request a voting certificate (voličský preukaz), which allowed them to vote in any district regardless of their residency. Voters abroad on election day were allowed to request a postal vote. According to the Central Election Committee, approximately 20,000 citizens of the Slovak Republic living abroad had requested a postal vote for the election. The deadline for requests passed on 10 January 2020.

== Political parties ==
The table below lists groups elected in the 2016 election, groups re-elected in the 2020 election and new group (ZĽ) elected in the 2020 election.

An informal political bloc, labeling itself the "democratic opposition," included the parliamentary parties Freedom and Solidarity and Ordinary People and Independent Personalities, the extra-parliamentary Christian Democratic Movement and the newly founded parties For the People, Progressive Slovakia and Together – Civic Democracy with the last latter running in coalition.

| List | Parties | Leader | Ideology | Previous election | | Seats before election | | Status |
| List | Parties | Leader | Ideology | Votes (%) | Seats | Seats before election | | Status |
|---|---|---|---|---|---|---|---|---|
| Smer | Direction – Social Democracy (Smer) | Peter; Pellegrini (Note: Peter Pellegrini served as electoral leader at the top of the party list and Robert Fico served as party chairman.) | Left-wing nationalism | 28.28 | 49 / 150 | 48 / 150 | | Government |
| SaS | Freedom and Solidarity (SaS); Civic Conservative Party (OKS) | Richard; Sulík | Conservative liberalism | 12.10 | 21 / 150 | 11 / 150 | | Opposition |
| OĽaNO | Ordinary People and Independent Personalities (OĽaNO); Christian Union (KÚ); New Majority (NOVA); Change from Bottom (ZZ) | Igor; Matovič | Liberal conservatism | 11.03 | 19 / 150 | 10 / 150 | | Opposition |
| SNS | Slovak National Party (SNS) | Andrej; Danko | National conservatism | 8.64 | 15 / 150 | 16 / 150 | | Government |
| ĽSNS | People's Party Our Slovakia (ĽSNS); Christian Democracy – Life and Prosperity (KDŽP); National Coalition (NK); Direct Democracy (PD); Fine at Home (DD) | Marian; Kotleba | Neo- Nazism | 8.04 | 14 / 150 | 10 / 150 | | Opposition |
| SR | We Are Family (SR) | Boris; Kollár | Right-wing populism | 6.63 | 11 / 150 | 9 / 150 | | Opposition |
| MH | Most–Híd (MH) | Árpád; Érsek (Note: Árpád Érsek served as electoral leader at the top of the party list and Béla Bugár served as party chairman.) | Hungarian minority interests | 6.50 | 11 / 150 | 10 / 150 | | Government |
| #SIEŤ | #Network (#SIEŤ) | Ivan; Zuzula | Liberal conservatism | 5.61 | 10 / 150 | 0 / 150 | (Note: In September 2016, #SIEŤ's parliamentary group ceased to exist and its MPs served as non-affiliated. In May 2017, the last party's MP left the party and it lost its parliamentary representation.) | Government (2016) |
| #SIEŤ | #Network (#SIEŤ) | Ivan; Zuzula | Liberal conservatism | 5.61 | 10 / 150 | 0 / 150 | (Note: In September 2016, #SIEŤ's parliamentary group ceased to exist and its MPs served as non-affiliated. In May 2017, the last party's MP left the party and it lost its parliamentary representation.) | Opposition (2016–2020) |

== Opinion polls ==
View source data.

== Results ==
Results of the election, showing vote strength for each party by district.

The ruling coalition comprising Direction – Social Democracy (Smer–SD), the Slovak National Party and Most–Híd, led by Prime Minister Peter Pellegrini of Smer–SD, was defeated by the anti-corruption movement Ordinary People and Independent Personalities led by Igor Matovič. However, as no party or electoral coalition attained an absolute majority of seats, a post-election coalition was required to form a government.

This election was also the first since 2006 where Smer–SD did not emerge as the party with the most seats in the National Council. Also, it was the first time that no party representing Hungarian community was elected. The coalition of Progressive Slovakia and Together failed to meet the 7% threshold for two-party coalitions to enter the parliament by only 926 votes, surprising analysts, as they had been several percentage points above the threshold required in opinion polls as recently as a few days before the election, and polled above the threshold in exit polls taken on election day. The coalition submitted an electoral complaint with the Constitutional Court on 12 March seeking a recount, although they did not have any expectation it would significantly change the results, and only did so in order to clear doubts about the democratic process. In total 820,411 votes fell below the electoral threshold, which is 28.47% of all valid votes.

| Party | Votes | % | +/– | Seats | +/– |
|---|---|---|---|---|---|
| OĽANO–NOVA–KÚ–ZZ | 721,166 | 25.03 | +14.00 | 53 | +34 |
| Direction – Social Democracy | 527,172 | 18.29 | –9.99 | 38 | –11 |
| We Are Family | 237,531 | 8.24 | +1.61 | 17 | +6 |
| Kotlebists – People's Party Our Slovakia | 229,660 | 7.97 | –0.07 | 17 | +3 |
| Progressive Slovakia–Together coalition | 200,780 | 6.97 | New | 0 | New |
| Freedom and Solidarity | 179,246 | 6.22 | –5.88 | 13 | –8 |
| For the People | 166,325 | 5.77 | New | 12 | New |
| Christian Democratic Movement | 134,099 | 4.65 | –0.29 | 0 | 0 |
| Hungarian Community Togetherness | 112,662 | 3.91 | –0.14 | 0 | 0 |
| Slovak National Party | 91,171 | 3.16 | –5.48 | 0 | –15 |
| Good Choice | 88,220 | 3.06 | New | 0 | New |
| Homeland | 84,507 | 2.93 | New | 0 | New |
| Bridge | 59,174 | 2.05 | –4.45 | 0 | –11 |
| Socialists.sk | 15,925 | 0.55 | New | 0 | New |
| We Have Had Enough! | 9,260 | 0.32 | New | 0 | New |
| Andrej Hlinka's Slovak People's Party | 8,191 | 0.28 | New | 0 | New |
| Democratic Party | 4,194 | 0.15 | +0.07 | 0 | 0 |
| Solidarity – Working Poor Movement | 3,296 | 0.11 | New | 0 | New |
| Mayors and Independents | 2,018 | 0.07 | New | 0 | New |
| Slovak Revival Movement | 1,966 | 0.07 | New | 0 | New |
| Voice of the Right | 1,887 | 0.07 | New | 0 | New |
| Labour of the Slovak Nation | 1,261 | 0.04 | New | 0 | New |
| 99% – Civic Voice | 991 | 0.03 | New | 0 | New |
| Slovak League | 809 | 0.03 | New | 0 | New |
| Total | 2,881,511 | 100.00 | – | 150 | 0 |
| Valid votes | 2,881,511 | 98.88 | | | |
| Invalid/blank votes | 32,698 | 1.12 | | | |
| Total votes | 2,914,209 | 100.00 | | | |
| Registered voters/turnout | 4,432,419 | 65.75 | | | |
Source: Statistical Office of the Slovak Republic

=== Results by parties ===
| Group | Parties | Seats | +/– |
|---|---|---|---|
| OĽANO–NOVA–Christian Union–Change from Below | Ordinary People and Independent Personalities–NOVA–Christian Union–Change from Below | 45 | +29 |
| OĽANO–NOVA–Christian Union–Change from Below | Christian Union | 4 | +4 |
| OĽANO–NOVA–Christian Union–Change from Below | NOVA | 2 | 0 |
| OĽANO–NOVA–Christian Union–Change from Below | Change from Below | 2 | +1 |
| Direction – Social Democracy | | 38 | –11 |
| We Are Family | | 17 | +6 |
| Kotlebists – People's Party Our Slovakia | Kotlebists – People's Party Our Slovakia | 14 | 0 |
| Kotlebists – People's Party Our Slovakia | Christian Democracy – Life and Prosperity | 3 | +3 |
| Freedom and Solidarity | Freedom and Solidarity | 12 | –8 |
| Freedom and Solidarity | Civic Conservative Party | 1 | 0 |
| For the People | | 12 | +12 |

=== Results by region ===
| Region | OĽaNO–NOVA–KÚ–ZZ | Smer | SR | ĽSNS | PS–Together | SaS | ZĽ | KDH | MKÖ–MKS | SNS | DV | Vlasť | Most–Híd | Other parties |
|---|---|---|---|---|---|---|---|---|---|---|---|---|---|---|
| Bratislava Region | 26.32 | 12.04 | 6.42 | 4.62 | 14.24 | 12.26 | 9.18 | 4.22 | 0.86 | 1.96 | 3.00 | 2.53 | 1.02 | 1.33 |
| Trnava Region | 28.08 | 14.58 | 7.37 | 6.59 | 5.98 | 5.35 | 4.67 | 3.08 | 11.44 | 2.19 | 2.13 | 2.20 | 4.83 | 1.51 |
| Trenčín Region | 23.97 | 23.44 | 9.82 | 9.23 | 6.57 | 5.64 | 4.55 | 3.85 | 0.02 | 3.95 | 3.34 | 3.52 | 0.19 | 1.91 |
| Nitra Region | 23.03 | 17.76 | 8.28 | 7.36 | 5.16 | 4.95 | 4.32 | 2.73 | 12.31 | 2.99 | 2.79 | 2.29 | 4.45 | 1.58 |
| Žilina Region | 24.94 | 20.58 | 8.52 | 9.71 | 6.02 | 5.59 | 4.72 | 6.60 | 0.03 | 4.73 | 3.23 | 3.51 | 0.16 | 1.66 |
| Banská Bystrica Region | 21.68 | 20.41 | 9.25 | 10.62 | 6.27 | 5.47 | 4.85 | 3.03 | 4.11 | 3.10 | 3.24 | 2.66 | 3.24 | 2.07 |
| Prešov Region | 25.63 | 20.99 | 8.39 | 8.50 | 4.37 | 4.08 | 6.15 | 8.37 | 0.04 | 3.69 | 3.54 | 3.51 | 0.70 | 2.04 |
| Košice Region | 26.28 | 17.54 | 8.36 | 7.76 | 5.46 | 5.19 | 6.51 | 4.41 | 4.66 | 2.65 | 3.07 | 3.09 | 2.72 | 2.30 |
| Foreign | 14.11 | 2.37 | 1.46 | 4.52 | 33.30 | 8.75 | 27.11 | 2.82 | 0.81 | 0.36 | 0.67 | 2.03 | 0.36 | 1.33 |
| Total | 25.03 | 18.29 | 8.24 | 7.97 | 6.96 | 6.22 | 5.77 | 4.65 | 3.90 | 3.16 | 3.06 | 2.93 | 2.05 | 1.73 |

OĽANO

Smer

SR

LSNS

PS

SaS

ZĽ

MKÖ–MKS

== Government formation ==
On 4 March, Matovič was tasked by the President of the Slovak Republic, Zuzana Čaputová, to form a new government. On 13 March, Matovič announced he had reached an agreement for a governing coalition with We Are Family, Freedom and Solidarity, and For the People, though they had not agreed upon a common governing program. He has not disclosed his picks for the new cabinet but said that his movement would retain the finance ministry and Richard Sulík, the leader of Freedom and Solidarity, would be the Ministry of Economy.

== See also ==
- List of members of the National Council of Slovakia, 2020–2023
