= Good Choice =

Slovak political party

Good Choice Dobrá voľba
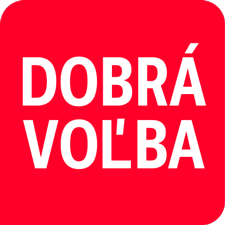
- Chairperson: Tomáš Drucker
- Vice-chairpersons: Branislav Becík; Katarína Cséfalvayová; Radomír Šalitroš
- Founded: 12 September 2019
- Dissolved: 30 September 2023
- Split from: Direction – Social Democracy
- Merged into: Voice – Social Democracy
- Headquarters: Jarošova 1, Bratislava-Nové Mesto
- Membership (2021): ▲262
- Ideology: Moderate politics; Technocracy; Pro-Europeanism
- Political position: Centre
- National affiliation: Voice – Social Democracy
- Colours: Red and blue

Website
- dobravolba.sk

Good Choice (Slovak: Dobrá voľba) was a political party in Slovakia. The party's goals were officially announced at a press conference on 12 September 2019. On 20 May 2023, the party approved a merger agreement with Voice – Social Democracy, which took effect on 30 September 2023.

== History ==
In August 2019, Tomáš Drucker announced his intention to establish a new political party. Even before announcing that the party would be called Good Choice, Robert Fico responded: "He just doesn't have it. This is a typical café, liberal politician ... " Drucker responded by announcing that the request for Tibor Gašpar to remain in his position existed and was demonstrated publicly by Fico.

On 12 September 2019, they submitted almost 30,000 signatures from citizens to the Ministry of the Interior and applied for registration of the Good Choice political party. Lucia Kurilovská and Tomáš Kuča, Rector of the Academy of the Police Force, and Director of the Press and Information Department of the Government Office, became another media-famous member of the newly emerging party in September 2019. They are still listed on the party's website in February 2020:

- Michal Sýkora
- Katarína Cséfalvayová
- Branislav Becík
- Radomír Šalitroš
- Anna Ghannamová
- Peter Kresák
- Martin Fedor
- Zuzana Dolinková
- Miroslav Kočan

== Election results ==
National Council
Election	Leader	Performance					Rank	Government
Election	Leader	Votes	%	± pp	Seats	+/–	Rank	Government
2020	Tomáš Drucker	88,220	3.06%	New	0 / 150	New	11th	Extra-parliamentary (Matovič's Cabinet)
2020	Tomáš Drucker	88,220	3.06%	New	0 / 150	New	11th	Extra-parliamentary (Heger's Cabinet)

== Surveys ==
According to a survey by the AKO Agency published on September 6, 2019, the party has a potential of 23.8% and the election result would reportedly reach 7.4%. The party considers the success of the surveys to be an encouragement for further work.

On 19 September, a FOCUS survey was published, where "Good Choice" gained only 2.1%. The party did not comment further on what could have caused such a sharp decline. According to the FOCUS methodology, it was not possible to determine a 95% confidence interval.

== See also ==
- Politics of Slovakia
- List of political parties in Slovakia
