= Zora Jaurová =

Slovak politician (born 1973)

Member of the National Council
- Incumbent
- Assumed office 25 October 2023

Deputy Leader of Progressive Slovakia
- Incumbent
- Assumed office 2023 Serving with Simona Petrík; Ivan Štefunko; Michal Truban; Tomáš Valášek
- Leader: Michal Šimečka

Personal details
- Born: 20 January 1973 (age 53) Bratislava, Czechoslovakia
- Party: Progressive Slovakia
- Spouse: Dušan Jaur
- Children: 1
- Relatives: Jozef Markuš (father)
- Education: Academy of Performing Arts in Bratislava

Zora Jaurová (née Markušová, born 20 January 1973) is a Slovak politician. Since 2023 she has served as an MP of the National Council of Slovakia.

== Biography ==
=== Early life and education ===
Zora Jaurová was born on 20 January 1973 in Bratislava. Her father was the Slovak nationalist activist and long-term president of the Matica slovenská, Jozef Markuš. She studied at the Academy of Performing Arts in Bratislava.

=== Professional life ===
Prior to entering politics, Jaurová was active in EU affairs and cultural management. She became widely known as the director of the transformation of cultural scene in Košice due to the city being awarded the European Capital of Culture in 2013 based on a project co-developed by Jaurová. Jaurová is the President of the Slovak Creative Industry Forum and a partner in Slovak film production company MPhilms.

=== Politics ===
Jaurová was one of the founding members of the Progressive Slovakia party in 2018. In 2023 Slovak parliamentary election she won a mandate in the National Council.

== Personal life ==
Jaurová is married to the Lutheran theologist Dušan Jaur. They have one son.
