= Juraj Hipš =

Slovak educator, activist and politician

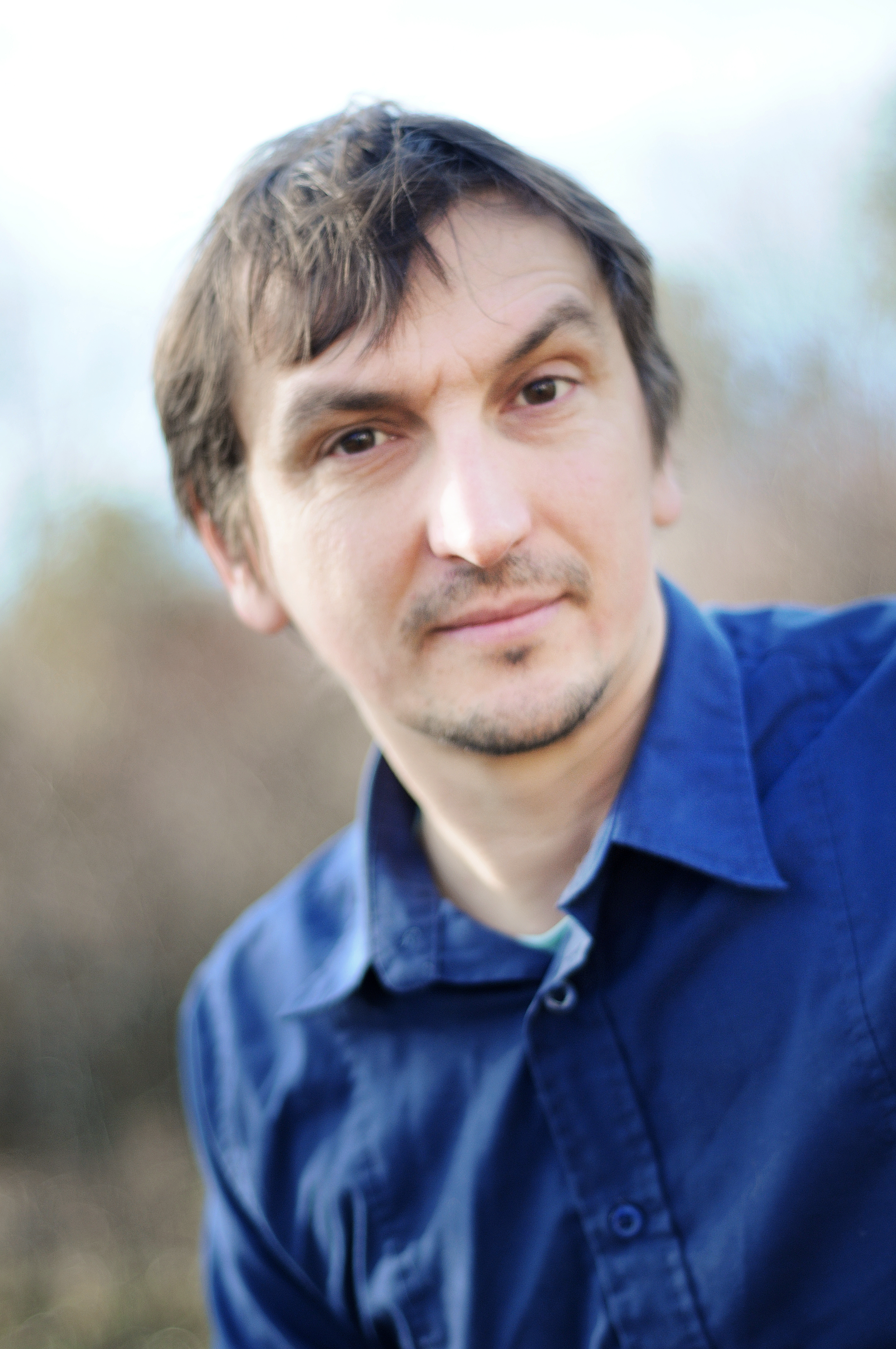

Chairman of the TOGETHER – Civic Democracy Party
- In office 25 April 2020 – October 2021

Personal details
- Born: 1976; Bratislava, Czechoslovakia
- Political party: TOGETHER – Civic Democracy
- Education: Faculty of Arts, Comenius University; Comenius University
- Occupation: Politician, educator

Juraj Hipš (born 1976) is a Slovak educator, activist in the field of education and teaching methodology and politician. In 2019, he entered politics as the chief education expert of the TOGETHER – Civic Democracy party. He was also its chairman from April 2020 to August 2021.

== Biography ==
Hipš was born in 1976 in Bratislava, Czechoslovakia. In 1999 he graduated with a master's degree in Philosophy and Aesthetics from the Faculty of Arts, Comenius University. He worked as a teacher at the Secondary School of Applied Arts and at a grammar school in Bratislava.

He founded the non-governmental organization CEEV Živica, under the banner of which he launched several educational programs (Socrates Institute, Comenius Institute). In 2019, he retired as director of Živica.

=== Political career ===
In 2019, he joined the new party TOGETHER – Civic Democracy party as an expert on education. In the 2020 parliamentary elections, he ran for the PS/TOGETHER coalition from 11th place on the candidate list. After the failure of the coalition of Progressive Slovakia and TOGETHER – Civic Democracy in the Slovak National Assembly elections on 29 February 2020, he ran from the position of a member of the party's presidium to the position of chairman of the TOGETHER party after the then chairman, Miroslav Beblavý, announced his retirement from politics. At the online congress on Saturday 25 April 2020, he received 144 votes from the delegates and became party chairman. His opponent for the position of party chairman was former general Pavel Macko, also a member of the presidium, who received 112 votes.

In August 2021, he resigned as chairman of TOGETHER, with the ambition to defend his vision of merging the party with the Progressive Slovakia movement at the September congress. However, the delegates elected Miroslav Kollár to the chairmanship, who saw the idea of merging with the PS as an abrupt reversal. He received 98 votes, Hipš received 62. At the same time, the delegates voted to reject the merger with the PS with 34 votes in favour and 73 against the merger.

== Personal life ==
He lives with his family in Zaježová, part of Pliešovce. His wife is a psychologist and lecturer Zuzana Labašová. They have three children.
