= Simona Petrík =

Slovak politician (born 1982)

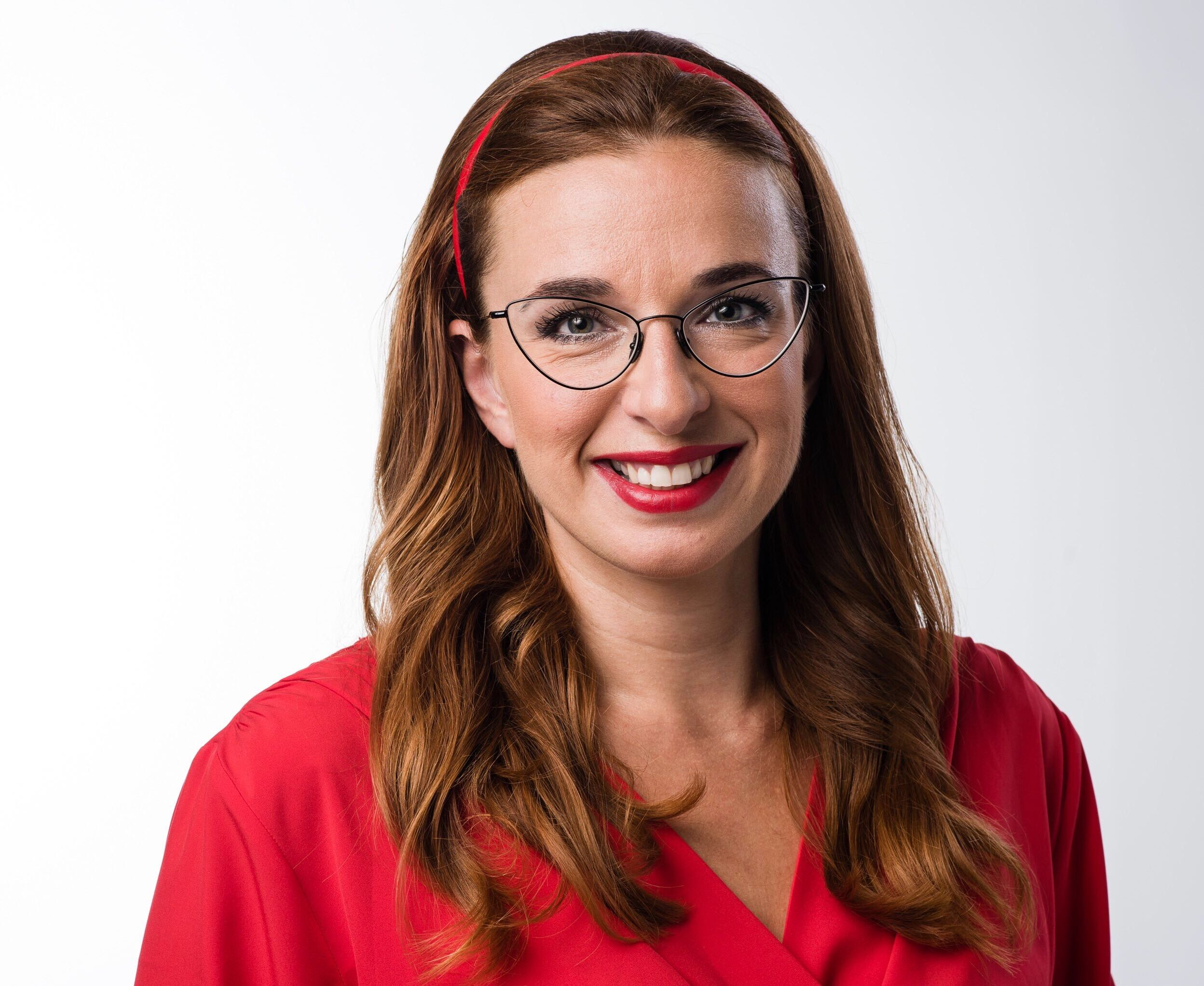

Member of the National Council
- Incumbent
- Assumed office 25 October 2023
- In office 23 March 2016 – 20 March 2020

Personal details
- Born: Simona Kováčiková; 10 October 1982 (age 44) Liptovský Mikuláš, Czechoslovakia
- Party: Progressive Slovakia (since 2021); Together – Civic Democracy (2017–2021); Sieť (2015–2016); Independent (before 2015)
- Spouse: Tomáš Petrík
- Children: 2
- Education: Comenius University

Simona Petrík (née Kováčiková, born 10 November 1982) is a Slovak politician who served as a member of the National Council of Slovakia from 2016–2020 and is serving again from 2023.

== Early life ==
Petrik was born on 10 November 1982 in Liptovský Mikuláš, Czechoslovak Socialist Republic. She studied political science at Comenius University in Bratislava. Prior to her political career, Petrik worked in the field of language education, running an English language educational agency. Petrik was also involved in feminist causes in Slovakia, working with the organization Real Women and founding the Women's Platform of Slovakia.

== Political career ==
Petrík entered politics in 2015 as a member of SIEŤ, where she provided support to the party around women's issues. Petrik was elected as a member of #Network in the 2016 Slovak parliamentary election, but after the Centre-right #Network entered a coalition with Smer-SD Petrik left the party and sat as an independent.

In April 2016, Petrík was prohibited to enter parliamentary chambers by Deputy Speaker Béla Bugár, due to the fact that she had her six-month old daughter with her.

During her time in the National Council, Petrík worked heavily on women's issues. Petrik filed a complaint with the Constitutional Court of Slovakia about discrimination around a law regulating private crèches (nursery schools). She also pointed out the unconstitutionality of extra fees charged by the hospital for childbirth, including choosing your own obstetrician, Epidurals, and the presence of the father in the delivery room. When news of the story came to light, the Ministry of Health pledged to remove those fees. She tabled a bill in parliament calling for ten days of paternity leave for expectant fathers.

Together with her independent parliamentary colleagues Miroslav Beblavý, Jozef Mihál, Katarína Macháčková, Viera Dubačová and Oto Žarnay, Petrik founded the party Democrats in April 2017. At the same time, the initiators and founders of the party published their call Vráťme Slovensko ľuďom.

In July 2017, News Agency of the Slovak Republic reported that Petrik was one of the "most curious" members of parliament, having asked 57 questions of the government. At the party's founding convention in Poprad on 14 April 2018, Petrík was elected one of the party's presidents.

During the 2019 European Parliament election in Slovakia in February 2019, Miroslav Beblavý of Democrats and Ivan Štefunko of Progressive Slovakia announced that the parties would run together in the European elections. Petrík placed third on the Democrats list with 22,499 votes, and was not elected.

In the 2020 Slovak parliamentary election, SPOLU ran in a coalition with Progressive Slovakia. Petrik was in the ninth position on the candidate list. She finished eighth place with 14,713 votes among coalition candidates, but the coalition failed to reach the 7% threshold to receive seats in parliament.

In May 2021, Simona Petrík left Spolu and joined Progressive Slovakia. She was elected MP in the 2023 Slovak parliamentary election.

== Personal life ==
Petrík is married with two children.
