= Michal Truban =

Slovak businessman and politician (born 1983)

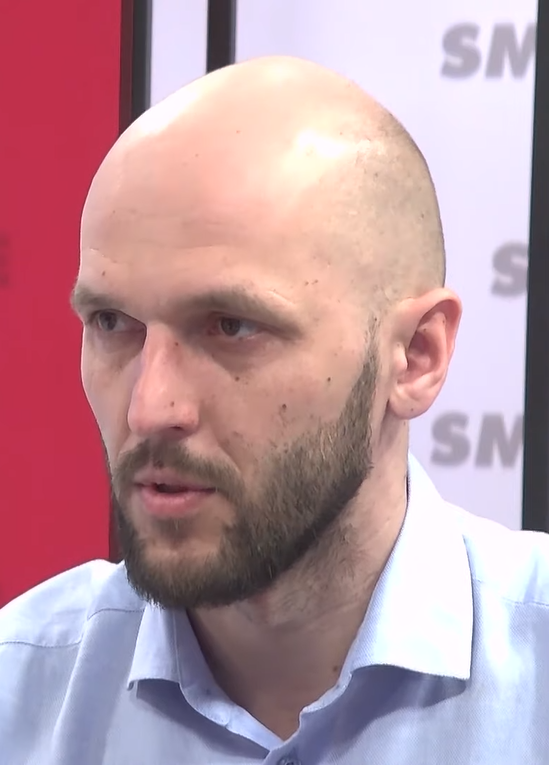

Member of the National Council
- Incumbent
- Assumed office 25 October 2023

Chairman of Progressive Slovakia
- In office 8 May 2019 – 1 March 2020
- Preceded by: Ivan Štefunko
- Succeeded by: Irena Bihariová

Personal details
- Born: 22 October 1983 (age 42) Kysucký Lieskovec, Czechoslovakia
- Party: Progressive Slovakia (2016–present); Independent (before 2016)
- Spouse: Dominika Fričová (m. 2015; div. 2018)
- Domestic partner: Adela Zábražná (2019-)
- Children: 2
- Website: www.truban.sk

Michal Truban (born 22 October 1983) is a Slovak businessman and politician who has served as a Member of the National Council since 2023. He has been a vice-president of Progressive Slovakia since 6 June 2020.

== Business career ==
Michal Truban founded Websupport, a web hosting company, as a high school student for his mother's business. The company became the eighth fastest-growing IT company in Central and Eastern Europe. In 2015, he was declared the IT personality of the year by the members of professional associations in the field of IT and telecommunications. However, a few months later, Truban announced his resignation as CEO and was replaced by Ján Cifra, but remained co-owner.

In 2016, Truban published his first book titled Support: Ako vybudovať úspešný biznis, aj keď robíte jednu chybu za druhou (lit. 'Support: How to build a successful business, even if you make one mistake after another'). The book contains the story of Websupport, as well as instructions and a discussion forum for entrepreneurs. According to Truban, over 6,000 copies of the book were sold in three months.

In February 2019, Truban announced that he would sell his half stake in Websupport, citing plans to focus on politics. Minority shares in the company were also sold by co-owners Pavel Stano and Ivan Štefunko, with whom Truban co-founded Progressive Slovakia.

Michal Truban spoke publicly against corruption especially in the IT sector. In 2015, he reported to the police persons who offered pre-won tenders to the Websupport company. Truban was also among those who strongly spoke out against TechMatch, a government-sponsored IT startup conference, which faced allegations of wasteful spending.

== Political career ==
=== Progressive Slovakia ===
Truban joined Progressive Slovakia in 2016 while also becoming a member of the board together with Zora Jaurová, Ivan Štefunko, and Martin Dubéci.

On 27 November 2017, the association was transformed into a liberal centrist political movement and registered under the Act on Political Parties. One year later, a survey of electoral preferences by the Focus agency measured him at 5.3%, which would exceed the quorum for entry into the National Council of the Slovakia for the first time.

In April 2019, after Ivan Štefunko announced that he would no longer be in the office, Truban was the only candidate who applied for the post. On 8 May 2019, the latter was elected as new chairman of the movement.

Based on a coalition agreement between Progressive Slovakia and Democrats from July 2019, Truban was leader of the joint candidate during the 2020 parliamentary elections where he received 75,962 votes.

Truban received the highest number of preferential votes of all candidates on the list. However, the coalition fell short of passing the representation threshold narrowly, missing just 926 votes. On 1 March 2020, he resigned from the position of chairman after the election failure. Truban competed for the position of chairman on a party congress in June, but was defeated by Irena Bihariová.

=== Radical digitization ===
Truban promotes radical digitization, hoping that Slovakia will become the first country whose citizens do not have to fill out forms at the office. He also visited Estonia during the campaign, which is a world leader digitization.

== Personal life ==
Between 2015 and 2019, Truban was married to medical research Dominika Fričová, with whom he temporarily lived in Jacksonville, Florida, where she worked on Parkinson's disease research. Afterwards, Truban has since been in a relationship with the entrepreneur Adela Zábražná. The couple has two children, Marieta and Milo, born in 2020 and 2022 respectively.

Truban stated that he does not follow any religion.

== Controversy ==
Truban was accused of promoting drug use based on a recorded speech, which contained a mention about editing the "blackhole" website to include more white. He later clarified his remarks were indeed about web page design and did not allude to cocaine. Truban also apologised for the part of his speech that disparaged manual laborers from his native region of Kysuce.
