= Irena Bihariová =

Slovak politician

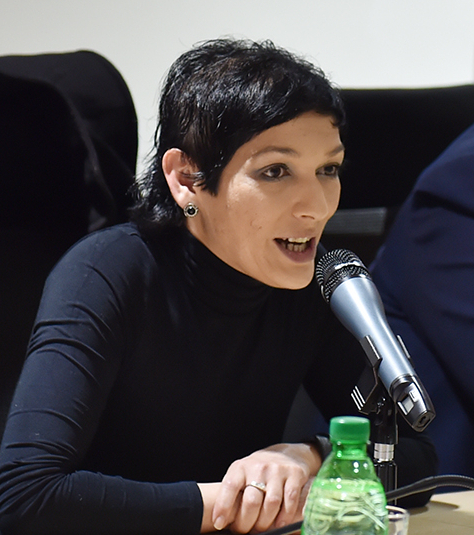

Member of the National Council
- Incumbent
- Assumed office 25 October 2023

Chair of the Progressive Slovakia
- In office 6 June 2020 – 7 May 2022
- Preceded by: Michal Truban
- Succeeded by: Michal Šimečka

Personal details
- Born: 15 September 1980 (age 45) Trnava, Czechoslovakia
- Party: Progressive Slovakia
- Education: Comenius University

Irena Bihariová (born 15 September 1980) is a Slovak lawyer and politician. She was the leader of Progressive Slovakia from June 2020 to May 2022. In 2022, a meeting of the Progressive Slovakia party took place, where the only candidate, Michal Šimečka, ran. He was elected chairman of the Party and Irena Bihariová was elected vice-president of the Party.

== Early life ==
Bihariová attended Faculty of Law at Comenius University in Bratislava, receiving a master's degree in 2009. She identifies herself as Romani, born in an "assimilated family".

Since 2009, Bihariová has been leader the association People against Racism. On 29 July 2013, she became vice-chairwoman of the Committee for the Prevention and Elimination of Racism, Xenophobia, Anti-Semitism and Other Forms of Intolerance at the Ministry of the Interior. She was elected for the "National Strategy for the Protection and Support of Human Rights in Slovakia".

== Political career ==
On 8 May 2019, Bihariová was elected vice president of Progressive Slovakia. She finished fourth place during the February 2020 parliamentary elections with 46,798 votes.

On 4 March 2020, Bihariová confirmed that she would run for party chairwoman. During the party congress on 6 June, Bihariová defeated Michal Truban. According to her, she was trying to enforce a "fragile balance between political idealism and pragmatism".

During the 2023 Slovak parliamentary election, she was elected as a member of the Progressive Slovakia.
