= Oto Žarnay =

Slovak politician and teacher

Member of the National Council
- In office 23 March 2016 – 20 February 2020

Personal details
- Born: 18 March 1969 (age 57) Košice, Czechoslovakia (now Slovakia)
- Education: University of Prešov

Oto Žarnay (born 18 March 1969 in Košice) is a Slovak teacher, anticorruption activist and politician. Between 2016 and 2020, he served as an MP of the National Council, elected on the Ordinary People and Independent Personalities list. In February 2017, he was one of the founding members of the Together – Civic Democracy party.

== Early life ==
Žarnay studied Pedagogy at the University of Prešov. He worked as a proofreader, editor and teacher.

=== Whistleblower ===
Žarnay worked as a teacher at Commerce Academy high school on the Polárna street in Košice. He was also the director of the teacher parents association at the school. In 2013 he wrote a public letter to the Prime Minister Robert Fico, stating that the school pays €400 monthly for likely bogus "external legal services". The management of the school refused to clarify the nature of services provided. In response the Minister of Education Peter Pellegrini requested a meeting with Žarnay to discuss his concerns.

Žarnay together with an MP Ján Mičovský filed a lawsuit against the school for wasteful and fraudulent use of public funds. The comptroller of Košice regional administration estimates that over the course of contract being in effect, the school paid a total of €12,000 without to a law firm without apparently receiving any services in return. In 2016, this finding was confirmed also by a central government auditor.

After the contract became public knowledge, it was no longer extended and soon expired. Nonetheless, Žarnay was fired for "organizational reasons" along with a physical education teacher who spoke in his defense. The dismissal was declared invalid by the appellate court of the Košice region in December 2018. The new school principal subsequently announced that Žarnay, who became an MP in the meantime, was welcome to return to be a teacher after his political career ended if he wished to return.

== Political career ==
Between 2014 and 2018, Žarnay served as a town councilor of Košice as an independent.

Žarnay successfully ran in the 2016 Slovak parliamentary election also on the Ordinary People and Independent Personalities list. In 2017 he joined Miroslav Beblavý, Jozef Mihál, Katarína Macháčková, Zuzana Zimenová, Simona Petrík and Viera Dubačová ti start a new party called Democrats. Following the party failure to pass the representation threshold in the 2020 Slovak parliamentary election he retired from politics.
