= Jozef Markuš =

Slovak politician (1944–2025)

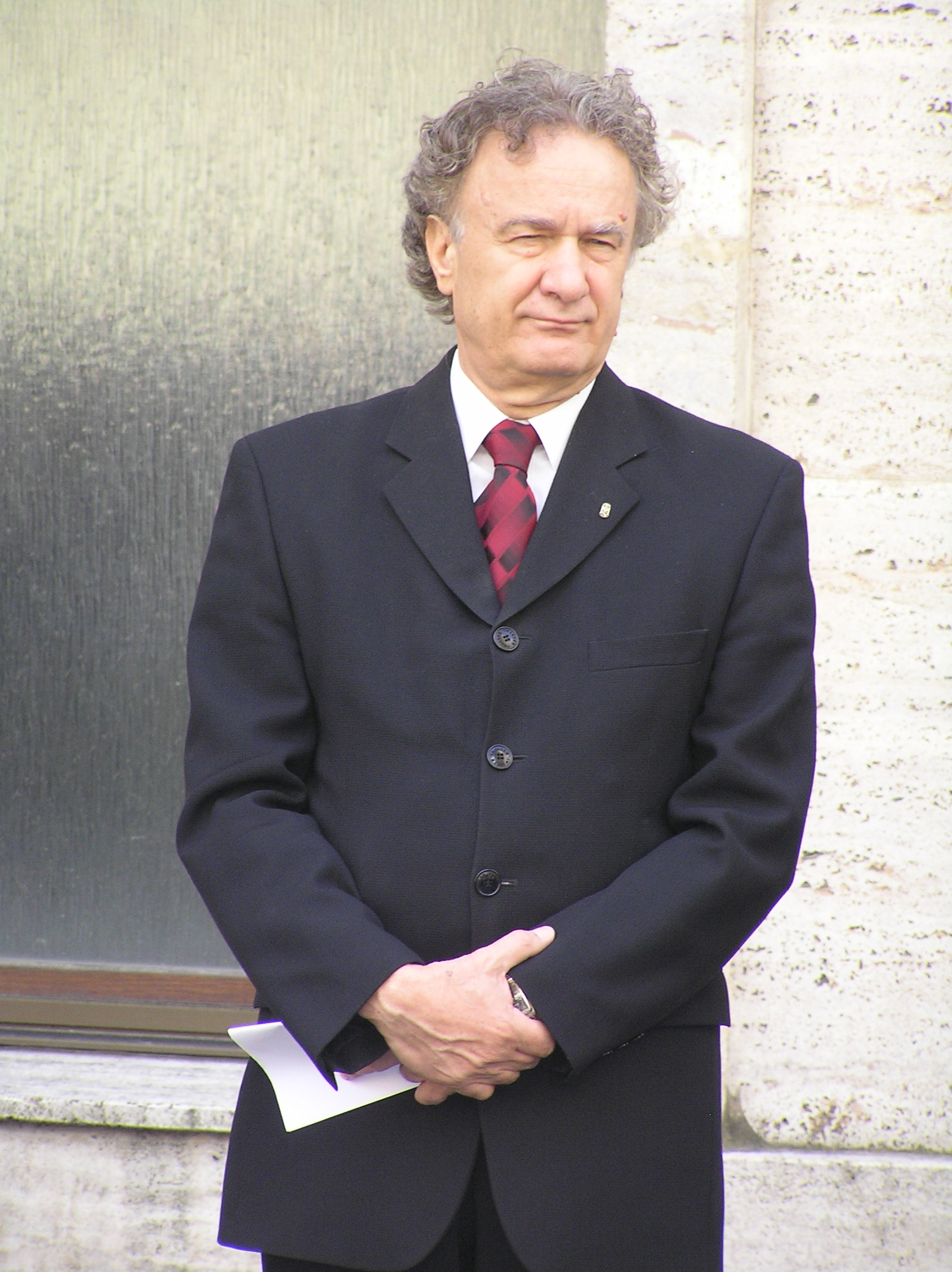
- Márkus in 2010

Deputy Prime Minister of the Slovak Socialist Republic
- In office December 12, 1989 – June 26, 1990
- Prime Minister: Milan Čič

Personal details
- Born: 13 March 1944 Nyíregyháza, Hungary
- Died: 3 March 2025 (aged 80)
- Children: Zora Jaurová (daughter)
- Education: University of Economics in Bratislava

Jozef Markuš (13 March 1944 – 3 March 2025) was a Slovak politician. He was the deputy chair of the transitory Slovak government designated after the Velvet Revolution to organize the first democratic election in the Czech and Slovak Federative Republic. From 1990 to 2010 he was the director of Matica slovenská.

== Life and career ==
Markuš was born on 13 March 1944 in Nyíregyháza, Hungary, to a Slovak family. In 1947, his family moved to Horná Seč in Czechoslovakia, during the Czechoslovak–Hungarian population exchange. He was educated at the Secondary School of Agriculture in Zlaté Moravce and studied agricultural economics at the University of Economics in Bratislava, graduating in 1968. Until 1972, he worked as a researcher at the Research Institute of Regional Planning in Bratislava and then, until 1988, worked as a researcher at the Institute of Economics of the Slovak Academy of Sciences. He then worked at the Prognostic Institute of the Slovak Academy of Sciences for a year. During this time, Markuš was an informer of the Czechoslovak communist secret police StB under the cover name "Economist".

After the revolution, he became an outspoken advocate for the independence of Slovakia. As a part of the transitory government of Slovakia headed by Milan Čič, Markuš pushed hard for increasing the role of the Slovak language. He was among the group of Slovak economists arguing for a more gradual transformation towards the market economy and against the "big bang" approach advocated by the central government of Czechoslovakia. He was deputy chair of the transitory Slovak government from 12 December 1989 to 26 June 1990. In early 1991, Markuš pushed for an immediate declaration of the independence of Slovakia.

Although he was initially seen as too radical by Vladimír Mečiar, the political leader of the Slovak nationalists, eventually the two men became allies. In 1990, Markuš became chairman of Matica slovenská, which, under his stewardship, generally enjoyed strong support from Mečiar's governments, although it sometimes failed to push through its most radical nationalist demands. He was chairman until 2010.

After leaving his post as director of Matica, Markuš faced criminal fraud accusations from his successor Marián Tkáč concerining his use of funds at Matica. The accusations focused on Markuš's role in the decision to invest the "Slovak National Treasure", proceedings of a popular fundraiser worth about one million euros, into a Ponzi scheme, leading to money being lost. Markuš received a deferred sentence of one year in jail in 2016. He appealed the verdict and eventually was found innocent in 2023.

Markuš was the father of the progressive artist and politician Zora Jaurová. She announced that he died on 3 March 2025, at the age of 80.
