= Miroslav Kollár =

Slovak politician (born 1969)

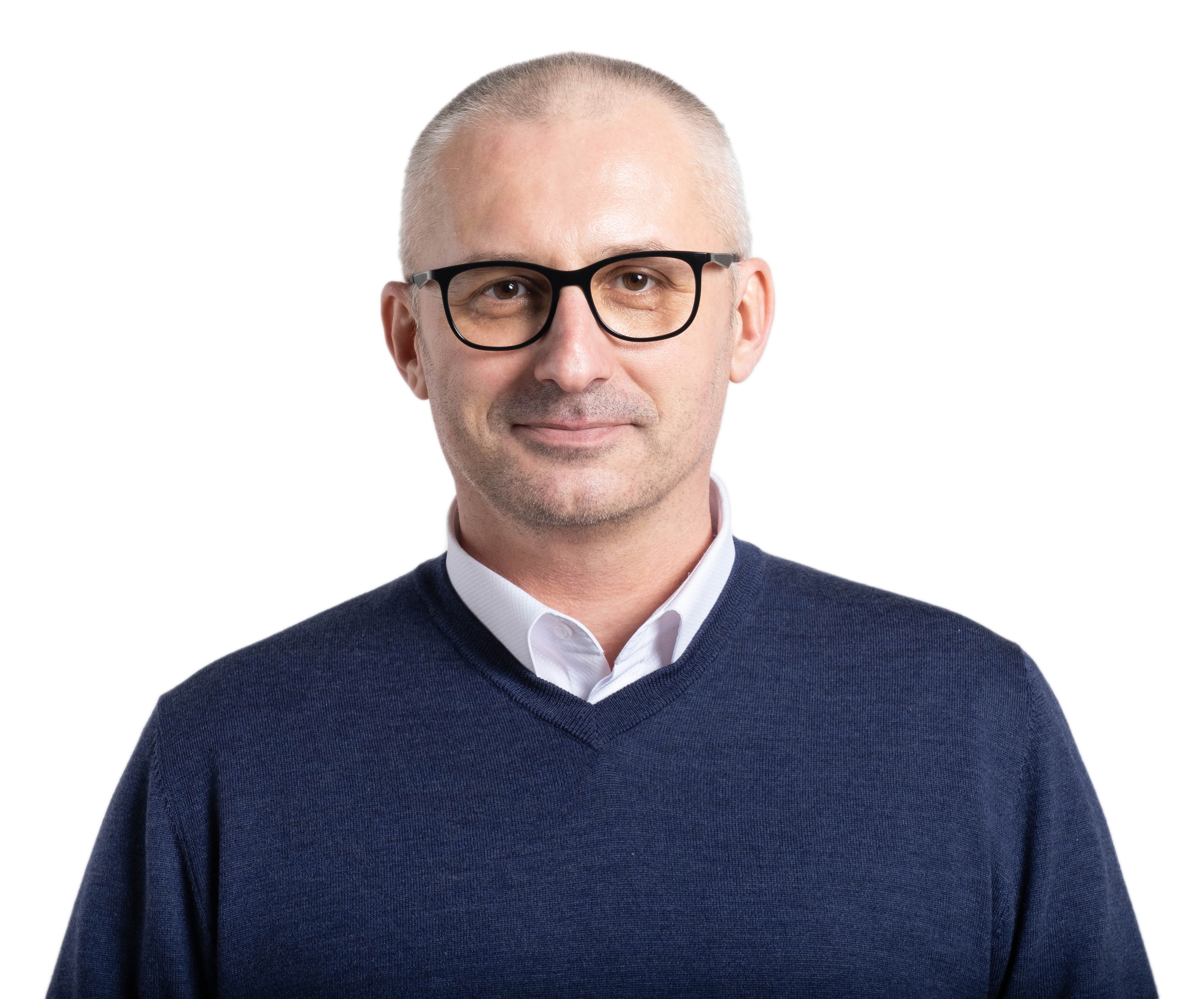

Member of the National Council
- In office 12 May 2020 – 25 October 2023

Chairman of the SPOLU - Civil Democracy party
- In office 25 September 2021 – 7 March 2023
- Preceded by: Juraj Hipš
- Succeeded by: Eduard Heger

Former Mayor of Hlohovec
- In office December 2014 – 2022
- Preceded by: Peter Dvoran
- Succeeded by: Ivan Baranovič

Personal details
- Born: 13 August 1968 (age 57) Hlohovec, Czechoslovakia
- Party: Democrats
- Other political affiliations: ZĽ
- Education: University of Economics in Bratislava
- Occupation: Politician

Miroslav Kollár (born 13 August 1969) is a Slovak politician. He served as a Member of the National Council from 2020 to 2023. From September 2021 he has served as the chairman and sole MP of the Together – Civic Democracy party. Between 2014 and 2022 he served as the mayor of Hlohovec.

== Early life ==
Kollár was born and raised in Hlohovec. He studied commerce at the University of Economics in Bratislava, graduating in 1991. After graduation, he worked as a journalist and was involved in a local politics in Hlohovec.

== Political career ==
In 2019 Kollár joined the new party of president Andrej Kiska For the People. In the V 2020 Slovak parliamentary election, he gained a seat.

He became the only government MP who refused to personally sign the coalition agreement. Even though he supported the government at the time, he felt the signature would limit his freedom to vote according to his personal conscience.

After the retirement of Andrej Kiska, Kollár unsuccessfully ran for the post of For the People chairman against Veronika Remišová.

In February 2021 he officially left the government as well as the For the People party. In April, he joined the Together – Civic Democracy party, which narrowly failed to pass the representation threshold in 2020, becoming its sole MP. Soon after, he became the Chairman of Together, having defeated the previous Chairman Juraj Hipš in a leadership contest.

In 2023, when Spolu transformed into Demokrati and failed to reach 3% of votes in 2023 Slovak parliamentary election, Kollár announced that he is stepping down from party presidency, taking a "political sabbatical".
