= Studia Academica Slovaca =

Coordinates: 48°08′26″N 17°06′59″E

Studia Academica Slovaca – the centre for Slovak as a foreign language (SAS) is a specialised department at the Faculty of Arts, Comenius University in Bratislava, teaching foreigners the Slovak language. It also regularly prepares the summer school. The first summer school was held in Bratislava in 1965.
