= Andrea Letanovská =

Slovak politician and physician

Member of the National Council
- In office 2 July 2020 – 7 April 2021

Personal details
- Born: 26 April 1969 (age 57) Bratislava, Czechoslovakia
- Party: For the People (Slovakia) (2020-2021); Democrats(2021)
- Education: Comenius University; Slovak Medical University

Andrea Letanovská (née Argalášová, born 26 April 1969) is a Slovak physician and politician. From 2020 to 2021, she was a member of the National Council.

== Biography ==
Letanovská was born on 26 April 1969 in Bratislava. She studied medicine at the Comenius University, graduating in 1993. In 2015, she obtained a PhD in surgery at the Slovak Medical University. Letanovská has worked in emergency medicine since graduation. Since 2017, she has worked as a consultant at the National Oncology Institute in Bratislava.

== Political career ==
Letanovská ran in the 2020 Slovak parliamentary election on the list of For the People party. She failed to win a mandate, but nonetheless became a deputy as a replacement for Vladimír Ledecký during the time he served as a State Secretary from 2020 to 2021, as the Slovak constitution does not allow for combination of government membership and parliament mandate. Following the loss of her seat, she left the party as well due to her disagreements with the leadership of Veronika Remišová.

In May 2021, she joined the Democrats party. In June 2023, Letanovská became the election leader of the Democrats for the 2023 Slovak parliamentary election.
