= Ivan Štefunko =

Slovak politician

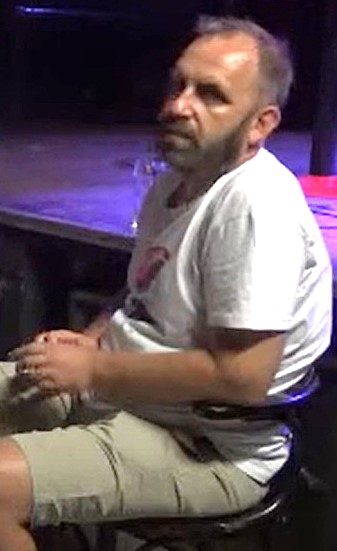
- Štefunko in 2017

Member of the National Council
- Incumbent
- Assumed office 15 October 2023

Chairman of Progressive Slovakia
- In office 20 January 2018 – 8 May 2019
- Preceded by: Office established
- Succeeded by: Michal Truban

Personal details
- Born: 4 March 1977 (age 49) Poprad, Czechoslovakia
- Party: Progressive Slovakia
- Education: Faculty of Political Science and International Relations, Matej Bel University

Ivan Štefunko (born 4 March 1977) is a Slovak politician, entrepreneur, and co-founder of multiple companies. He served as chairman of Progressive Slovakia from 2018 until 2019. Since 2023, he serves as an MP of the National Council of Slovakia.

== Early life ==
Štefunko was born on 4 March 1977 in Poprad. He spent most of his childhood in Algeria due to his parents' job. He attended Sciences Po from 2004 until 2006, majoring in European studies.

== Political career ==
Upon graduation from university, Štefunko became chairman of the now-defunct political party Young Democratic Left. His political activities continued under the leadership of Milan Ftáčnik, but it also disappeared due to the merger with Direction – Social Democracy. In the 2010 interview for Pravda, Štefunko criticised the policy of Direction and Robert Fico.

Štefunko further stated that Direction – Social Democracy has not brought any fundamental improvement in people's lives in 10 years. Mikloš said at the time: "Štefunko wanted to continue playing different games, so he asked the great Mikloš for money. He arranged for him to contact ProPartners at the time, and they are still financing him today."

In 2016, Štefunko co-founded the civil association Progressive Slovakia that aimed to offer progressive solutions to social problems in Slovakia. Sociologist Slosiarik was very interested in this type of party project, but according to him, Štefunko's personality will not be enough for success.

In the 2020 Slovak parliamentary election, Štefunko was the sixth candidate of the Progressive Slovakia/Democrats coalition, where he received 8,481 votes. Upon taking preferential votes into account, Štefunko was ranked 14th among the candidates. Due to the result of the coalition, he did not enter the parliament. Štefunko gained an MP seat in the 2023 Slovak parliamentary election.

== Personal life ==
Štefunko is married and has three children.
