= Tomáš Valášek =

Slovak politician

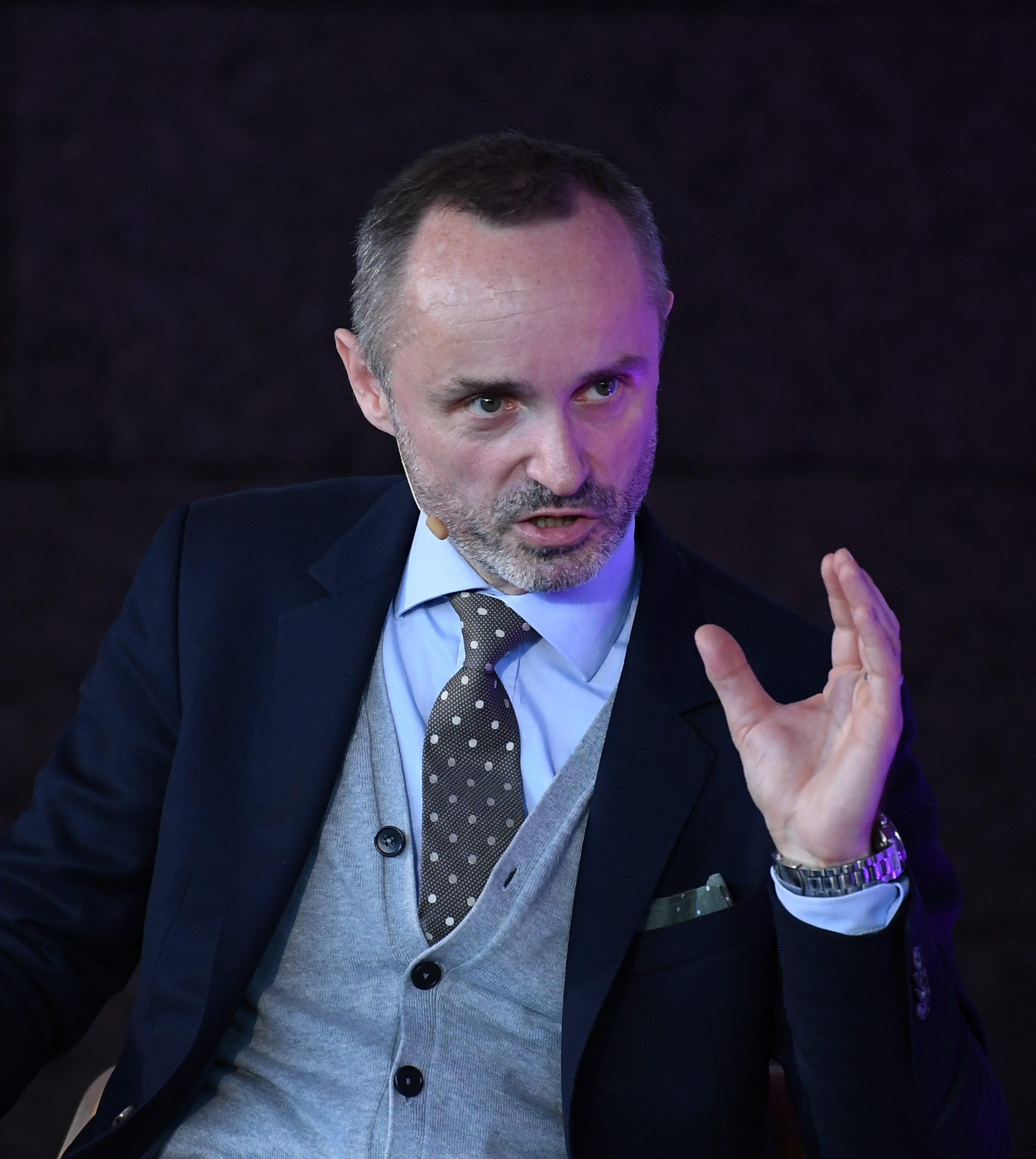
- Valášek at the Web Summit in 2017

Member of the National Council
- Incumbent
- Assumed office 21 March 2020

Permanent Representative of Slovakia to NATO
- In office 2013–2017

Personal details
- Born: 21 June 1972 (age 53) Trnava, Czechoslovakia
- Party: Progressive Slovakia (2021–present)
- Other political affiliations: For the People (2019–2021)
- Education: George Washington University; University of Georgia

Tomáš Valášek (born 21 June 1972) is a Slovak diplomat and politician. From 2013 to 2017 he served as the ambassador of Slovakia to NATO. From 2020 he is a Member of the National Council.

Tomáš Valášek studied journalism at the Comenius University but did not finish. Following a semester abroad in Antwerp, he moved to the US to study at the University of Georgia. Following his graduation in Journalism at the University of Georgia, Valášek went on to study International Affairs at the George Washington University.

Following his studies, Valášek worked at the think tanks World Security Institute, Centre for European Reform and Carnegie Endowment for International Peace. In 2013 he Valášek became the Slovak ambassador to NATO, a post he held until 2017.

In the 2020 Slovak parliamentary election Valášek was elected to the National Council on the list of the For the People party. In March 2021, he quit the party due to his disagreement with the failure of For the People to leave the government in response to the purchase of the Russian-made Sputnik V COVID-19 vaccine. In April 2021, he joined the Progressive Slovakia party, becoming the party's sole MP.

As the Progressive Slovakia MP, Valášek tabled legislation legalizing civil unions for same-sex couples, decriminalizing marijuana use, pension reform and the update of the legal definition of rape based on lack of consent, removing the requirement of the presence or threat of physical violence. His proposals failed to win a majority in the National Council.
