= Michal Šimečka =

Slovak politician

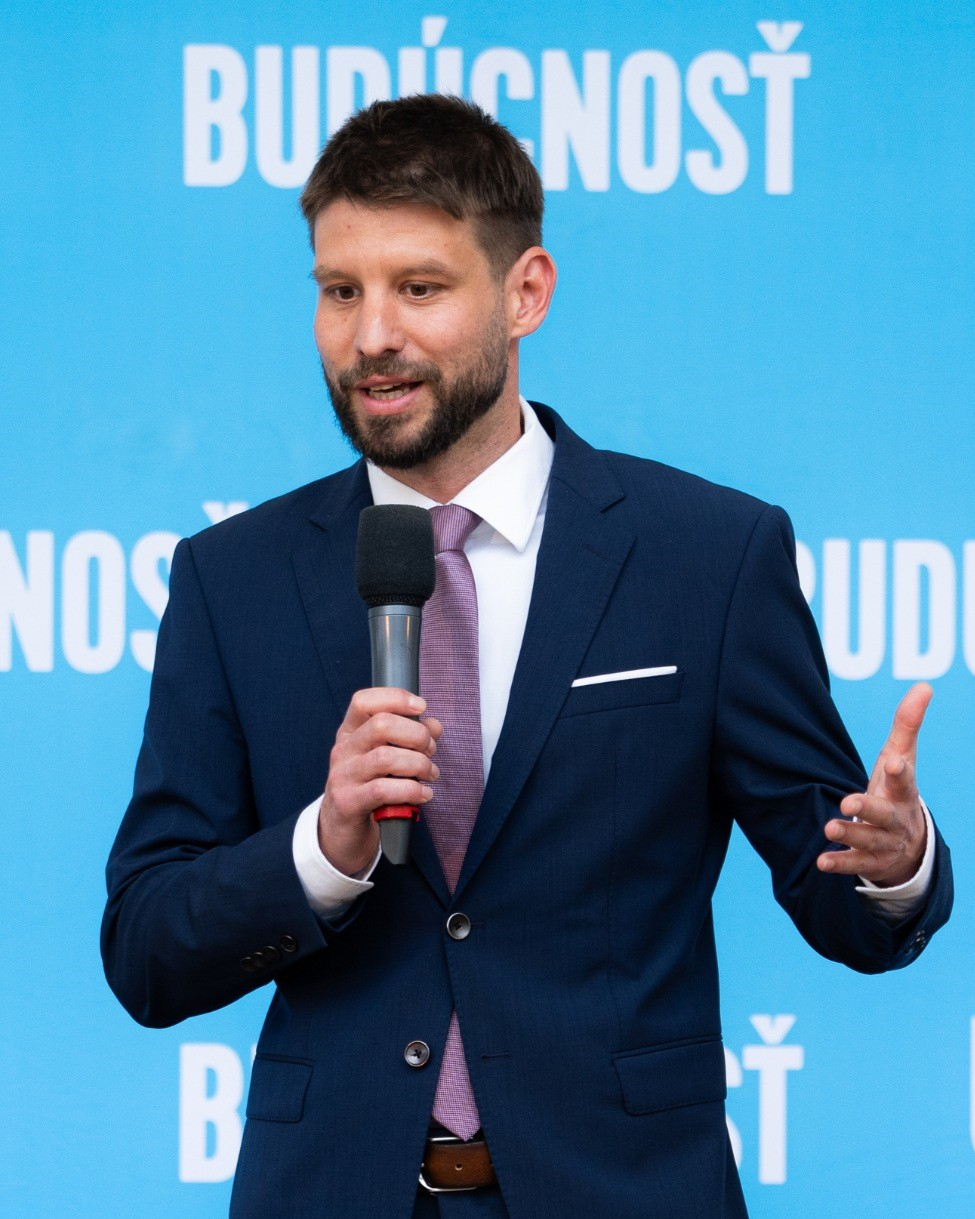
- Šimečka in 2023

Deputy Speaker of the National Council
- In office 25 October 2023 – 17 September 2024 Serving with Andrej Danko, Tibor Gašpar, Peter Žiga and Ľuboš Blaha
- Speaker: Peter Pellegrini; Peter Žiga (acting)

Member of the National Council
- Incumbent
- Assumed office 25 October 2023

Vice-President of the European Parliament
- In office 18 January 2022 – 17 October 2023 Serving with See List
- President: Roberta Metsola
- Succeeded by: Martin Hojsík

Member of the European Parliament for Slovakia
- In office 2 July 2019 – 24 October 2023

Chairman of Progressive Slovakia
- Incumbent
- Assumed office 7 May 2022
- Preceded by: Irena Bihariová

Personal details
- Born: 10 May 1984 (age 42) Bratislava, Czechoslovakia (now Slovakia)
- Party: Progressive Slovakia (2017–present)
- Education: Charles University (BA); St Antony's College, Oxford (MPhil); Nuffield College, Oxford (DPhil)

Michal Šimečka (born 10 May 1984) is a Slovak politician, journalist, and researcher who served as a Vice-President of the European Parliament between 2022 and 2023. He also became a Member of the European Parliament between 2019 and 2023. In 2020, Šimečka was elected vice-president of the European political group Renew Europe. He is a co-founder of the social-liberal Progressive Slovakia party, leading it from 2022. He is currently an opposition leader against the Fico government.

== Early life and education ==
Šimečka earned a bachelor's degree in political sciences and international relations from the Charles University in Prague in 2006. He obtained an MPhil in Russian and East European Studies at St Antony's College at the University of Oxford in 2008, before moving to Nuffield College, where he received a DPhil in Politics and International Relations in 2012.

== Political career ==
=== Member of the European Parliament (2019–2023) ===
Šimečka is a member of the European Parliament Intergroup on LGBT Rights and European Parliament Intergroup on Traditional Minorities, National Communities and Languages.

During the European Parliament elections in May 2019, Šimečka was the leader of the coalition candidate Progressive Slovakia and Democrats, which won with a profit of 20.11%. He was elected MEP with 81,735 preferential votes. Later that November, Šimečka was elected rapporteur on the establishment of an EU Mechanism on Democracy, the Rule of Law and Fundamental Rights.

In October 2020, Šimečka presented his proposal for a mechanism combining several tools which monitor the respect of rule of law and European values, which received majority support in the European Parliament. He explained that the EU should do more to address the abuse of EU funding, writing that "an implicit bargain between net contributors and net recipients" should end.

From 2020 until 2021, Šimečka served as deputy chair of the Renew Europe parliamentary group, under the leadership of chair Dacian Cioloș.

=== Member of the National Council of Slovakia and Leader of the Opposition (2023–present) ===
In the 2023 Slovak parliamentary election, Šimečka ran as the leader of the Progressive Slovakia list, which won 32 mandates in the National Council. He personally received over 300,000 preferential votes, the third highest number after Robert Fico and Peter Pellegrini. Immediately after the election, he gave up vice-presidency of the EP as well as his MEP mandate to focus on leading the opposition in Slovakia.

As the leader of the second strongest faction, Šimečka unsuccessfully tried to prevent the SMER party from coming back to power by forming a coalition government with Voice – Social Democracy, Freedom and Solidarity and Christian Democratic Movement. Nonetheless, this effort failed because Peter Pellegrini, the leader of Voice, decided to form a coalition government with SMER and the Slovak National Party instead.

On 25 October 2023, Šimečka was elected vice-president of the National Council. He received 92 votes, 29 MPs voted against and 21 abstained. Nonetheless, in September 2024, the prime minister Robert Fico demanded his removal, accousing Šimečka's family of profiting from over a million euro in public subsidy. Šimečka rejected the allegations, arguing his relatives active in cultural and NGO sphere legitimately applied for grant funding which he could no influence in any way because Progressive Slovakia was never a part of government. Moreover, a major part of the funding was approved during previous governments of Robert Fico. Progressive Slovakia published a list of dozens of coalition MPs, whose relatives received public subsidies, arguing its a common and legitimate situation. Nonetheless, on 17 September 2024, Šimečka lost a non-confidence vote with the slightest possible majority of 76, with three government MPs, all from the Voice party, rebelling and not voting for Šimečka's removal.

Following the vote, Šimečka stated the vote was an "unprecedented political revenge" targeting him as the leader of the opposition. The vote resulted in international condemnation as well. Valérie Hayer, the leader of Renew Europe fraction in the European Parliament strongly condemned the removal of Šimečka at a plenary meeting of the European Parliament, stating it was "another step towards undermining democracy in Slovakia by the regime of Robert Fico". 20 Czech prominent personalities, including the former PM of Czechia Petr Pithart called for the speaker of the Czech Parliament Markéta Pekarová Adamová to suspend any contacts with the Slovak parliament.

In January 2025, large anti-government protests organised by a protest group Mier Ukrajine (lit. 'Peace to Ukraine') broke out in Slovakia. The same year on 31 January, prime minister of Slovakia Robert Fico together with Slovak Information Service showed photographs of Mamuka Mamulashvili, a leader of the Georgian National Legion (designated as a terrorist group by the Russian government) with opposition activist Lucia Štasselová (2023 photograph from public debate in Bratislava) and online news commentator Martin M. Šimečka, the father of opposition leader Michal Šimečka (photo from the handover of humanitarian aid purchased from a fundraising for Mamulashvili's unit in November 2023). Despite the age and circumstances of both photos, Fico used them to accuse the activists and the government opposition of plotting a coup d'état in the country, which they denied.

== Political views ==
Šimečka supports the LGBT community, voicing support for the Rainbow Ribbon campaign in 2021.

== Personal life ==
Šimečka is the son of journalists Martin Milan Šimečka and Marta Šimečková (née Frišová). He lives in Bratislava with his partner Soňa Ferienčíková and their daughter Táňa (b. 2020).
