= Faculty of Arts, Comenius University =

Arts school in Bratislava, Slovakia

Coordinates: 48°08′26″N 17°06′59″E

Faculty of Arts, Comenius University in Bratislava
- Filozofická fakulta Univerzity Komenského v Bratislave
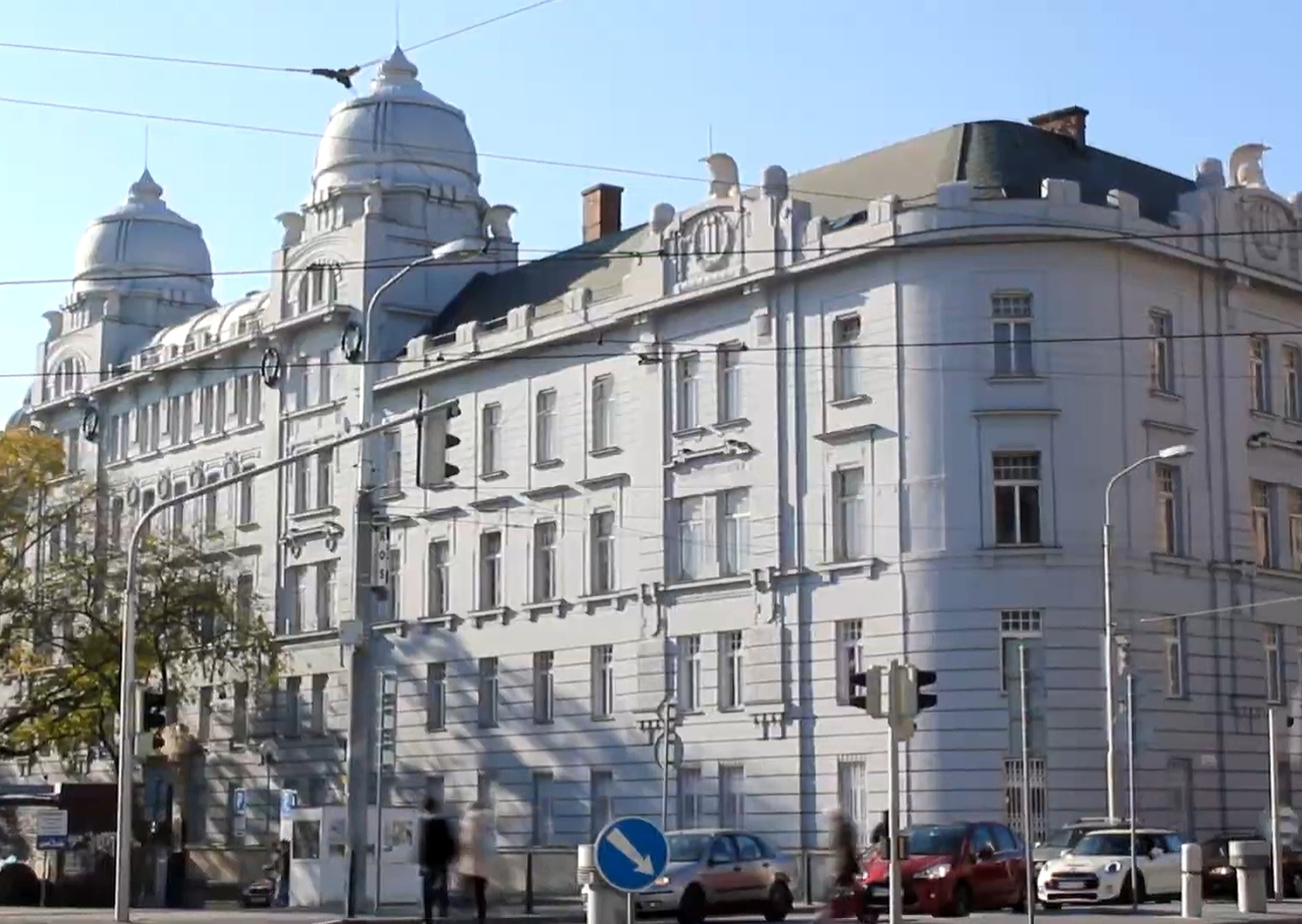
- The main faculty building at Gondova 2
- Latin: Universitas Comeniana Bratislavensis, Facultas Philosophica
- Other names: FiF UK
- Type: Public
- Established: 1921
- Parent institution: Comenius University
- Dean: Marián Zouhar
- Location: Gondova 2, Bratislava, 814 99, Slovakia
- Language: Slovak
- Website: fphil.uniba.sk

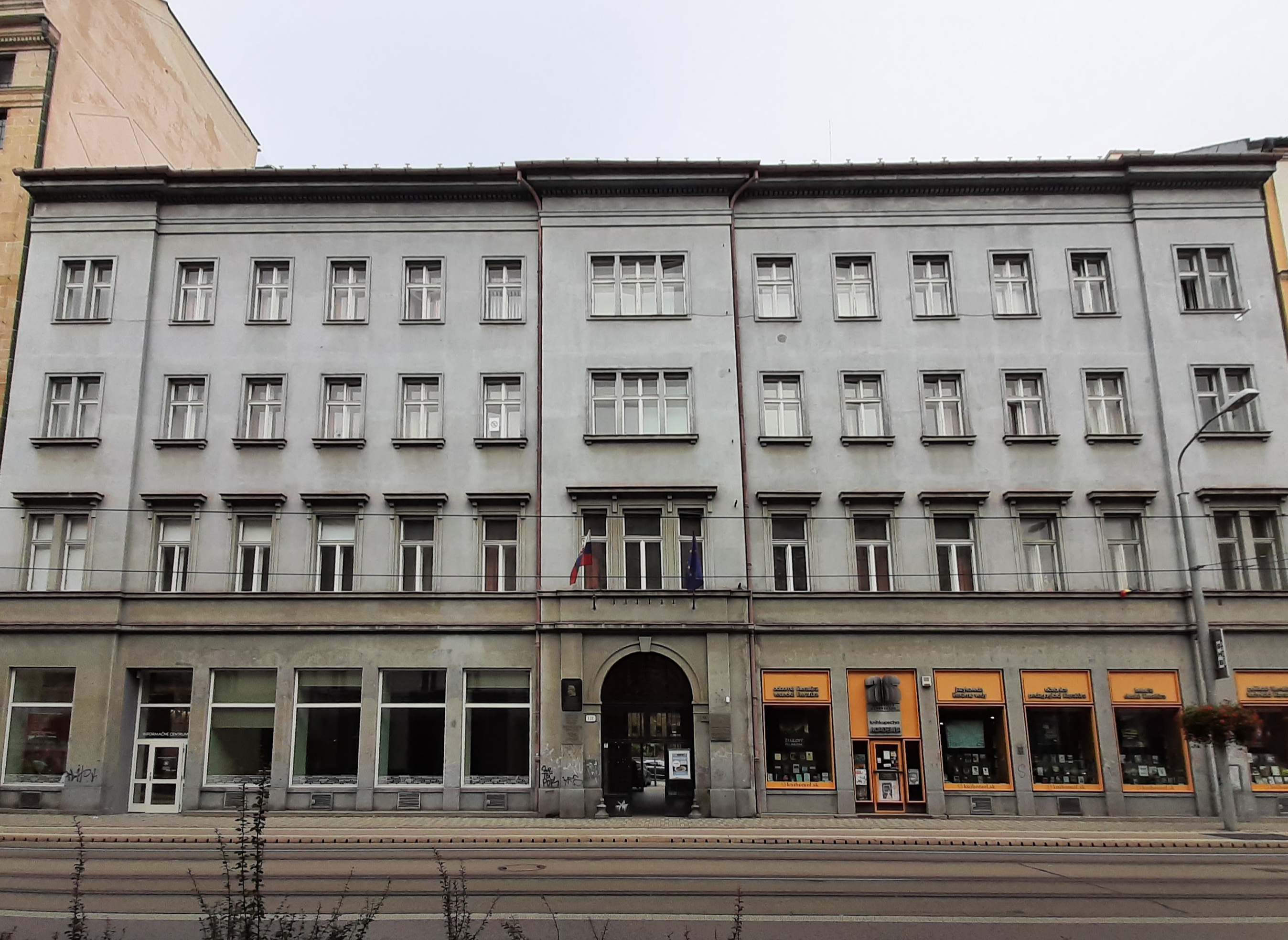
Department building at Štúrova 9

The Faculty of Arts at Comenius University in Bratislava (Slovak: Filozofická fakulta Univerzity Komenského v Bratislave) in Slovakia was founded in 1921 and has several academic departments.

The Department of Journalism was formed in 1992 with a merger of three older departments. Its origins can be traced back to 1952, when it was named the Department of Newspapering and Librarianship. The chairman of the department is Ján Hacek, PhD.

There is a total of more than 30 departments which include: Aesthetics, Archive Studies and Museology, Comparative Religious Studies, General History, Musicology, Philosophy and History of Philosophy, Psychology, Romance Studies, and Slavic Studies.

Students in the British and American Studies Department started an English-language comedy troupe.

== See also ==
- Studia Academica Slovaca
- Comenius University
