= Horná Seč =

Village and municipality in Slovakia

Horná Seč Felsőszecse
- Municipality
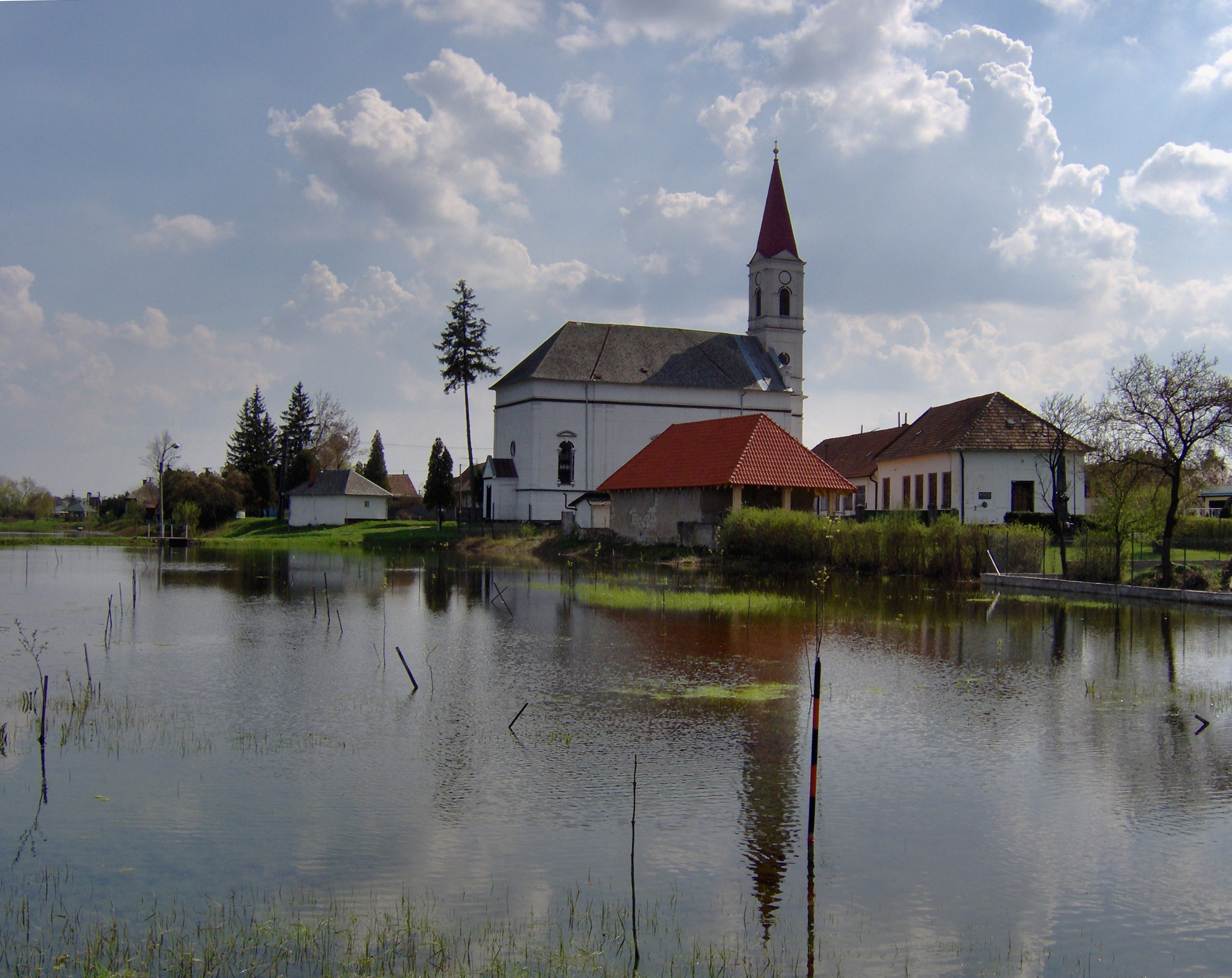
- Church in Horná Seč

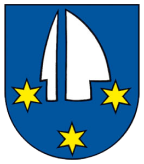
- Flag Coat of arms

- Location of Horná Seč in the Nitra Region Location of Horná Seč in Slovakia
- Coordinates: 48.20°N 18.55°E
- Country: Slovakia
- Region: Nitra Region
- District: Levice District
- First mentioned: 1355

Area
  - Total: 8.30 km^{2} (3.20 sq mi)
- Elevation: 158 m (518 ft)

Population (2025)
  - Total: 588
- Time zone: UTC+1 (CET)
  - Summer (DST): UTC+2 (CEST)
- Postal code: 935 31
- Area code: +421 36
- Vehicle registration plate (until 2022): LV
- Website: www.hornasec.sk

Horná Seč (Hungarian: Felsőszecse) is a village and municipality in the Levice District in the Nitra Region of Slovakia.

== History ==
In historical records the village was first mentioned in 1355.

== Geography ==
The municipality lies at an altitude of 158 metres (518 ft) and covers an area of 8.30 km^{2} (3.20 sq mi) (2025).

== Population ==
Population statistic (10 years)
| Year | 1995 | 2005 | 2015 | 2025 |
|---|---|---|---|---|
| Count | 481 | 493 | 534 | 588 |
| Difference | | +2.49% | +8.31% | +10.11% |

Population statistic
| Year | 2024 | 2025 |
|---|---|---|
| Count | 585 | 588 |
| Difference | | +0.51% |

It has a population of 588 people (31 December 2025).

=== Ethnicity ===
Census 2021 (1+ %)
| Ethnicity | Number | Fraction |
|---|---|---|
| Slovak | 487 | 85.43% |
| Hungarian | 80 | 14.03% |
| Not found out | 8 | 1.4% |
| Total | 570 | |

In year 2021 was 570 people by ethnicity 487 as Slovak, 80 as Hungarian, 8 as Not found out, 4 as Czech, 1 as Jewish, 1 as Romani, 1 as Rusyn and 1 as Other.

Note on population: The difference values of population numbers in the table "Population statistic" and in the sections "Ethnicity" & "Religion" is caused by the use of various statistical methods.

=== Religion ===
Census 2021 (1+ %)
| Religion | Number | Fraction |
|---|---|---|
| None | 168 | 29.47% |
| Roman Catholic Church | 160 | 28.07% |
| Church of the Brethren | 84 | 14.74% |
| Evangelical Church | 77 | 13.51% |
| Calvinist Church | 49 | 8.6% |
| Jehovah's Witnesses | 15 | 2.63% |
| Not found out | 7 | 1.23% |
| Total | 570 | |

In year 2021 was 570 people by religion 168 from None, 160 from Roman Catholic Church, 84 from Church of the Brethren, 77 from Evangelical Church, 49 from Calvinist Church, 15 from Jehovah's Witnesses, 7 from Not found out, 4 from Apostolic Church, 3 from Other, 2 from Greek Catholic Church and 1 from Ad hoc movements.

== Facilities ==
The village has a public library and a football pitch.

== Genealogical resources ==
The records for genealogical research are available at the state archive "Statny Archiv in Nitra, Slovakia"

- Roman Catholic church records (births/marriages/deaths): 1726-1771 (parish B)
- Lutheran church records (births/marriages/deaths): 1845-1898 (parish B)
- Reformated church records (births/marriages/deaths): 1827-1945 (parish B)

== See also ==
- List of municipalities and towns in Slovakia
