= Democrats (Slovakia) =

Democrats Demokrati
- Chairman: Jaroslav Naď
- Vice Chairmen: Eduard Heger; Andrea Letanovská; František Oľha; Juraj Šeliga
- Founders: Miroslav Beblavý
- Founded: 28 January 2018 (as Together – Civic Democracy)
- Split from: Network
- Preceded by: Civic Democratic Platform (Note: splinter faction from OĽaNO) (Democrats)
- Headquarters: Palisády 33; 811 06 Bratislava-Staré Mesto
- Membership (2023): ▲397
- Ideology: Liberal conservatism Pro-Europeanism
- Political position: Centre to centre-right
- European affiliation: European People's Party
- European Parliament group: European People's Party Group (2019–2024)
- Colours: Magenta; Purple; Turquoise
- National Council: 1 / 150
- European Parliament: 0 / 15
- Regional governors: 0 / 8
- Regional deputies (Note: Also with coalitions): 36 / 419
- Mayors: 7 / 2,904
- Local councillors: 184 / 20,462

Website
- smedemokrati.sk

The Democrats (Slovak: Demokrati), known as Together – Civic Democracy (Slovak: Spolu – občianska demokracia, Spolu) from 2018 until 2023, and later the Blue Coalition (Slovak: Modrá koalícia, Modrí), is a Slovak political party founded in 2018 by Miroslav Beblavý. The party has changed leadership multiple times and is led by the former Minister of Defense of Slovakia Jaroslav Naď since 2 December 2023.

== Ideology ==
Together – Civic Democracy was a centre-right conservative liberal and liberal conservative party. Spolu was placed as centrist or centre-right on the political spectrum. The former chairman of the party Eduard Heger presented the party as centrist, pro-European, pro-NATO and green.

== History ==
=== Creation and parliamentary elections ===
The creation of Spolu was announced on 17 November 2017, by former under-secretary of Sieť Miroslav Beblavý, who left the party in protest of its decision to join the Smer-led government, and former under-secretary of liberal SaS Jozef Mihál.

The party presented itself as a centre-right, pro-European party focusing on a modern economy, accessible healthcare and a functional educational system.

The Founding Council of Spolu consisted of independent MPs of the National Council of the Slovak Republic and former members of Sieť, SaS and OĽaNO: Oto Žarnay, Jozef Mihál, Simona Petrík, Viera Dubačová, Miroslav Beblavý, Katarína Macháčková and lawyer Pavel Nechala of Transparency International.

The party's founding congress was held on 14 April 2018 in Poprad. Miroslav Beblavý was elected as its leader. Katarína Macháčková and Jozef Mihál were elected as deputy leaders, with the third deputy leader being Erik Baláž, founder of environmentalist campaign We are the forest, and recipient of the White Crow 2017 award for the fight against corruption.

In the 2020 Slovak parliamentary election, Spolu joined the socially liberal party Progressive Slovakia with which they created a coalition but narrowly failed to get into the parliament due to its low popularity.

=== Crisis of Heger's Cabinet ===
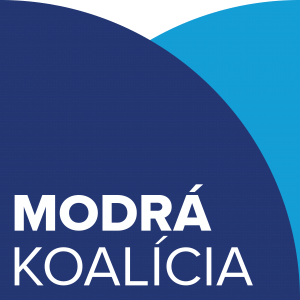
Blue Coalition logo

After the crisis of Cabinet of Eduard Heger in 2023, then-leader of the party Miroslav Kollár met former prime minister of Slovakia Mikuláš Dzurinda, with whom he planned to co-operate during the following parliamentary elections. Dzurinda had originally planned to create his own liberal-conservative political force "The Blues – European People's Party", but the announcement of early elections changed his plans.

On 27 January, after the announcement of a snap election, Dzurinda presented the Blue Coalition, returning to Slovak politics after leaving it ten years ago. At a press conference, Dzurinda presented his project, with which he wants to fight "for a European Slovakia", wants to be "a reasonable alternative to the mafia and chaos" and "for a modern and educated Slovakia". He called the Blue Coalition his new political home. Dzurinda's press conference was attended by former members of the SDKÚ-DS and leader of the SPOLU party Miroslav Kollár. Both the leader of ODS and the leader of Democrats of Slovakia, minor centre-right parties which cooperated with SPOLU, announced their support for the Blue Coalition.

Due to disagreements with Kollár, Dzurinda left the project shortly after and founded his own The Blues – European Slovakia party. Then-Prime Minister of Slovakia Eduard Heger assumed the leadership of the party which was renamed to Demokrati (lit. 'Democrats')

The Democrats promoted a petition to hold a referendum on life payments for ex-leaders.

== Criticism ==
The leader of the Christian Democratic Movement Milan Majerský criticized Dzurinda's "dream" of uniting the KDH, SaS and PS in the elections, saying that the "non-aggression pact" with Progressive Slovakia in the last elections brought damage to the party.

== Party leaders ==
Leader		Year
Together – Civic Democracy
1	Miroslav Beblavý	2018–2020
2	Juraj Hipš	2020–2021
3	Miroslav Kollár	2021–2023
Blue Coalition
3	Miroslav Kollár	2023–2023
Democrats
4	Eduard Heger	2023–2023
5	Jaroslav Naď	2023–present

== Election results ==
=== National Council ===
==== Together – Civic Democracy ====
Election	Leader	Votes	%	Rank	Seats	+/–	Status
2020	Miroslav Beblavý	200,780	7.0%	5th	0 / 150		Extra-parliamentary
2020	In coalition with Progressive Slovakia, which did not win any seat.						

==== Democrats ====
Election	Leader	Votes	%	Rank	Seats	+/–	Status
2023	Eduard Heger	87,006	2.9%	10th	0 / 150	0	Extra-parliamentary

=== European Parliament ===
==== Together – Civic Democracy ====
Election	List leader	Votes	%	Rank	Seats	+/–	EP Group
2019	Michal Šimečka	198,255	20.1%	1st	2 / 14		EPP
2019	In coalition with Progressive Slovakia, which won 4 seats in total.						

==== Democrats ====
Election	List leader	Votes	%	Rank	Seats	+/–	EP Group
2024	Jaroslav Naď	69,204	4.7%	7th	0 / 15	▼2	–
