= Progressive Slovakia =

Social-liberal political party in Slovakia

Progressive Slovakia Progresívne Slovensko
- Abbreviation: PS
- Leader: Michal Šimečka
- Deputy leaders: See list: Irena Bihariová; Beáta Jurík; Ivan Korčok; Simona Petrík; Ivan Štefunko; Michal Truban; Tomáš Valášek
- Founder: Ivan Štefunko; Zuzana Čaputová; Michal Šimečka
- Founded: 27 November 2017; 8 years ago
- Headquarters: Štúrova 12/4, 81109 Bratislava
- Think tank: Progressive Institute
- Youth wing: Young Progressives
- Membership (2024): ▲698
- Ideology: Social liberalism Liberalism; Pro-Europeanism
- Political position: Centre
- European affiliation: Alliance of Liberals and Democrats for Europe
- European Parliament group: Renew Europe
- Colours: Capri
- Slogan: We create the future together (2023)
- National Council: 33 / 150
- European Parliament: 6 / 15
- Regional governors: 1 / 8
- Regional deputies (Note: Also with coalitions): 38 / 419
- Mayors: 9 / 2,904
- Local councils: 302 / 20,462

Website
- progresivne.sk
- Politics of Slovakia; Political parties; Elections; A: The party has also been described as centre-left and centre-right.

Progressive Slovakia (Slovak: Progresívne Slovensko, PS) is a liberal and social-liberal political party in Slovakia established in 2017. The party is led by Michal Šimečka, a former Vice President of the European Parliament. It is a member of the Renew Europe group and is a full member of the Alliance of Liberals and Democrats for Europe Party. PS currently has 6 MEPs: Ľudovít Ódor (former Prime Minister of Slovakia), Veronika Cifrová Ostrihoňová (a former journalist), Martin Hojsík, Michal Wiezik (both environmental activists), Ľubica Karvašová, and Lucia Yar.

Zuzana Čaputová, the former president of Slovakia who is also the co-founder and former deputy leader of PS who won the 2019 Slovak presidential election, was nominated by the party for the election, focusing her campaign on themes of anti-corruption, environmentalism, and pro-Europeanism. In the National Council, it was first represented by deputy Tomáš Valášek elected for For the People, which he left in 2021. In local politics, PS has a dominant position in Bratislava, cooperating with Team Bratislava and Freedom and Solidarity. It also has a strong position in Trnava Region, with Jozef Viskupič being the regional governor.

== History ==
The party was registered as Progressive Slovakia (PS) with the Ministry of Interior of the Slovak Republic on 27 November 2017, after the submission of 13,500 signatures. The party's founding congress was held on 20 January 2018, which resulted in Ivan Štefunko being elected as the party's chairman. Štefunko views the left–right political spectrum as obsolete, instead aiming for the party to be a centrist and liberal political movement, claiming that "Slovakia is full of people who want a modern, open and European country". Štefunko stepped down as the party's leader in 2019 following criticism of his past involvement in business and politics, although the official reasoning for his resignation was due to health issues. Štefunko was replaced by former deputy leader Michal Truban. Truban is an IT professional, an entrepreneur, and an anti-corruption activist who also favors digitalization of governance and bureaucracy.

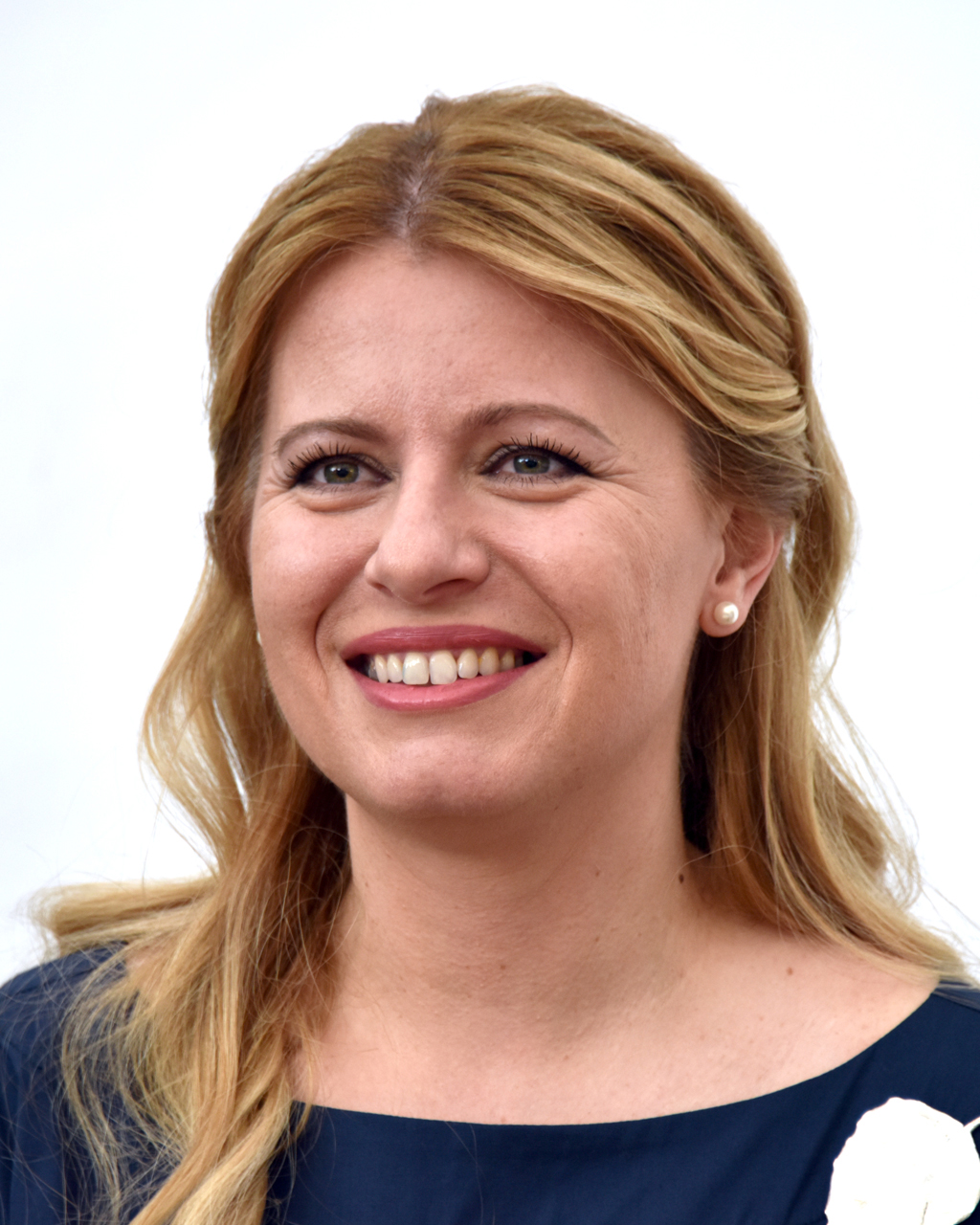
Zuzana Čaputová, co-founder and former deputy leader of Progressive Slovakia, became the country's first female president, as well as the youngest president in the history of Slovakia

PS first gained attention in 2018 when Matúš Vallo, its favored candidate, won the 2018 municipal elections in Bratislava, and subsequently became the city's mayor. After the 2019 Slovak presidential election, the victory of its presidential candidate, 45-year-old lawyer Zuzana Čaputová, was hailed by international media commentators as a victory of liberalism over populism. According to political scientist Michael Rossi, Čaputová's popularity is related to her appeal as an outsider amidst frustration over political corruption and clientelism among the electorate. Čaputová first gained fame as a campaigner against a toxic waste dump created by real estate brokers who were connected to the ruling Smer-SD, which led to many commentators describing her as the "Slovak Erin Brockovich". While campaigning for the presidency, Čaputová focused on the issues of corruption, inflation, justice, the environment, and overhaul of healthcare, and ran on the slogan "stand up to evil". She stayed silent on the issue of immigration and open borders, which most Slovaks were opposed to, and was the only major candidate not to condemn the Global Compact for Migration.

PS got the highest share in the 2019 European Parliament election in Slovakia, earning over 20.1% of the vote and becoming the largest party represented in the Slovak section of the European Parliament, with the Smer-SD's 15.7% and the neo-fascist Kotleba – People's Party Our Slovakia's 12.1%. For the 2020 Slovak parliamentary election, PS signed a cooperation agreement and non-aggression pact with former president Andrej Kiska's extra-parliamentary For the People party and the Christian Democratic Movement. In an upset on election day, the PS/SPOLU coalition narrowly missed on entering the National Council after finishing with 6.96% of the vote, as coalitions must reach a threshold of 7% in order to enter Parliament.

== Ideology ==
Progressive Slovakia is generally described as social-liberal, as well as liberal. The party is socially progressive, holding culturally liberal views, and is pro-European. PS is economically liberal, and has been called neoliberal. PS also support queer rights, such as same-sex unions and same-sex marriage. In its communication, the party uses gender-balanced language and presents gender-equal lists in all elections. The party refuses to cooperate with the "extremist parties" and the left-conservative Direction – Social Democracy.

The party's position on the political spectrum is nuanced and has been debated. Internationally, PS has been generally described as centrist, centre-right, or centre-left. Slovak politologist Darina Malová positioned the party on the left-wing of the political spectrum, labeling them a "modern left-wing" party; she distinguished them from the "old school" left-wing Slovak parties, such as Direction – Social Democracy. Despite this, the party is generally associated with the centre-right in Slovakia, with the majority of its voters describing themselves as right-wing.

Following the 2023 parliamentary election, in which Progressive Slovakia became the main opposition, the party, under Michal Šimečka's leadership, is making a strategic shift towards a more centrist position. PS aims to broaden its appeal to rural voters and non-urban regions, moving away from its previous image as a "Bratislava party." This shift includes a focus on defending democratic values, institutions, and the rule of law, with Šimečka describing its current role as paradoxically taking on a "conservative role" to protect existing democratic structures while remaining open to compromise on specific programmatic issues. The inclusion of figures such as Ľudovít Ódor and Ivan Korčok in the leadership reflects a more technocratic and moderate approach, emphasizing PS's pro-European stance and its attempt to expand its base in upcoming elections, including regional and local contests.

Domestic Policy

The main goals of Progresívne Slovensko under the leadership of chairman Michal Šimečka are the fight against corruption and the restoration of the rule of law, the reduction of living costs, especially for housing, and the implementation of the economic program Tresk .

Since its inception, Progresívne Slovensko has also emphasized reducing regional disparities, improving healthcare and education. The movement plans to build new hospitals, intensify the digitalization of public and state administration, and provide targeted assistance in the form of a housing allowance. It also focuses on topics such as the rule of law and justice, environmental protection, a religiously neutral state, or the socioeconomic situation of the Roma minority.

PS has long distanced itself from the policies of Robert Fico and his coalition partners and, before the 2027 parliamentary elections, promotes close cooperation among opposition parties despite differences in opinion source. The movement's chairman, Michal Šimečka, emphasizes that if the opposition is to replace the government of Robert Fico, it must prevent the waste of votes through coordinated action .

Fight Against Corruption

Progresívne Slovensko has repeatedly criticized the corruption scandals of Robert Fico's governments and introduced the program "Hammer on Corruption" (Kladivo na korupciu), aimed at effectively fighting corruption and strengthening the rule of law.

The pillars of the program are stricter penalties for corruption and the restoration of institutions that specialize in investigating corrupt criminal acts .

According to the movement, penalties for the highest-ranking state officials must be stricter. At the same time, PS proposes “the rule that thieves, in addition to punishment, will also have to return all stolen property” and “if it is discovered that a company obtained a state contract through a bribe, it will not return only the bribe, but will return the entire profit from this contract to the state”.

Housing Crisis

After being re-elected as chairman of Progresívne Slovensko, Michal Šimečka devoted a large part of his speech to solutions for the cost-of-living crisis, with a special focus on housing costs.

The movement promotes the massive construction of apartments, up to 30,000 per year, the introduction of a targeted housing allowance, and 100% financing for mortgages. It wants to ensure the doubling of construction speed by introducing acceleration zones with reduced bureaucracy, waiving land withdrawal fees, or providing state land for apartment construction

Economic Policy and the Tresk Program

Economics has gradually become one of the leading topics of Progresívne Slovensko; the party's candidates included former Prime Minister and Vice-Governor of the National Bank of Slovakia Ľudovít Ódor and former director of the Value for Money Unit Štefan Kišš.

Both economists are co-authors of the Tresk program, which the movement's chairman, Michal Šimečka, described as a “comprehensive series of honest reforms and measures that will kickstart Slovakia's economy”. “We are offering a completely new economic model for Slovakia, which has its roots in the necessary digital and green transformation. We place emphasis on investment, not squandering the future. At the center of our attention is human capital, support for entrepreneurship, and talent. Better research centers than assembly plants,” described one of the authors, Ľudovít Ódor, about the program.

When Tresk was presented to the public, experts with various economic backgrounds spoke positively about specific aspects of the program, such as right-wing economist Ivan Mikloš or chairwoman of the Confederation of Trade Unions Monika Uhlerová.

== European representation ==
In the European Parliament, PS sits in the Renew Europe group with two MEPs. The party joined the Alliance of Liberals and Democrats for Europe Party in November 2018. In the European Committee of the Regions, PS sits in the Renew Europe CoR group with one full member for the 2025–2030 mandate. Jozef Viskupič is a member of the Bureau of the Renew Europe CoR group.

== Election results ==
=== National Council ===
Election	Leader	Votes	%	Rank	Seats	+/–	Government
2020	Michal Truban	200,780	6.97	▲5th	0 / 150	0	No seats
2020	In coalition with Together – Civic Democracy, which did not win any seat.						
2023	Michal Šimečka	533,136	18.0	▲2nd	32 / 150	▲32	Opposition

=== European Parliament ===
Election	List leader	Votes	%	Rank	Seats	+/–	EP Group
2019	Michal Šimečka	198,255	20.1	1st	2 / 14	▲2	RE
2019	In coalition with Together – Civic Democracy, which won 4 seats in total.						
2024	Ľudovít Ódor	410,844	27.8	1st	6 / 15	▲4	RE

=== Presidential ===
Election	Candidate	First round			Second round		
Election	Candidate	Votes	%	Rank	Votes	%	Rank
2019	Zuzana Čaputová	870,415	40.6	1st	1,056,582	58.4	1st
2024	Endorsed; Ivan Korčok	958,393	42.5	1st	1,243,709	46.9	2nd

== Party chairpersons ==
Chairperson		Year
1	Ivan Štefunko	2018–2019
2	Michal Truban	2019–2020
3	Irena Bihariová	2020–2022
4	Michal Šimečka	2022–present

== See also ==
- List of political parties in Slovakia
- Politics of Slovakia
