= Jozef Mihál =

Slovak politician and tax consultant

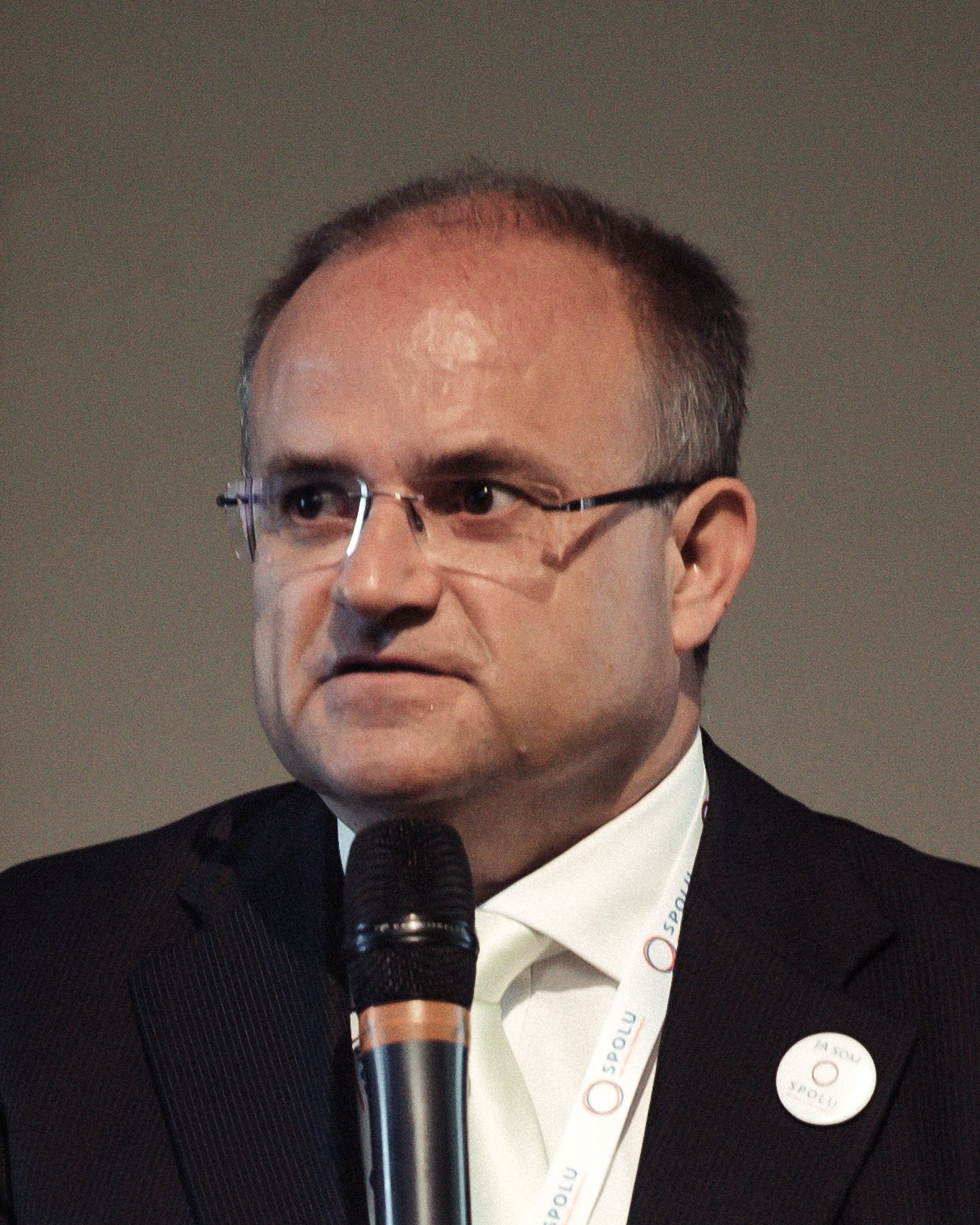

Deputy Prime Minister of Slovakia
- In office 9 July 2010 – 4 April 2012
- Prime Minister: Iveta Radičová

Minister for Labour, Social Affairs, and Family
- In office 9 July 2010 – 4 April 2012
- Prime Minister: Iveta Radičová
- Preceded by: Viera Tomanová
- Succeeded by: Ján Richter

Member of the National Council of the Slovak Republic
- In office 2016–2020

State Secretary of the Ministry of Labour, Social Affairs and Family of the Slovak Republic
- Incumbent
- Assumed office 21 March 2020
- President: Zuzana Čaputová
- Premier: Igor Matovič

Personal details
- Born: 18 March 1965 (age 61) Nitra, Czechoslovakia (now Slovakia)
- Party: Independent
- Other political affiliations: Nádej (2006–2009); SaS (2009–2017); Spolu (2017–2020); SaS (2020–2022)
- Children: Three
- Education: Charles University; Comenius University
- Profession: Tax consultant

Jozef Mihál (born 18 March 1965) is a Slovak politician and tax consultant. He was Deputy Prime Minister; Minister for Labour, Social Affairs, and Family; and deputy leader of Freedom and Solidarity (SaS).

Mihál attended Charles University in Prague, graduating in mathematics and physics in 1988. He worked for Aurus. From 2005 to 2006, he served as an advisor to the government on reform of health insurance. From 2007, he has owned his own company, Relia, which provides consultancy and training on tax.

He ran for the National Council with Freedom and Solidarity in the 2010 election. SaS came third, with 22 seats, while Mihál personally received the third-most votes amongst SaS candidates: easily winning election. The party formed a four-party centre-right coalition, and Mihál was appointed to the government as Freedom and Solidarity's Deputy Prime Minister and as Minister of Labour, Social Affairs and Family.

As minister, Mihál has worked with Ivan Mikloš and Ivan Uhliarik to eliminate tax loopholes. He has championed reforming the social security system with the 'levy bonus', along the lines of the 'universal benefit' being adopted by the Conservative-led government in the United Kingdom.
