= 2023 Slovak parliamentary election =

- 30 September 2023

All 150 seats in the National Council 76 seats needed for a majority
- Opinion polls
- Turnout: 68.5% (▲2.7pp)
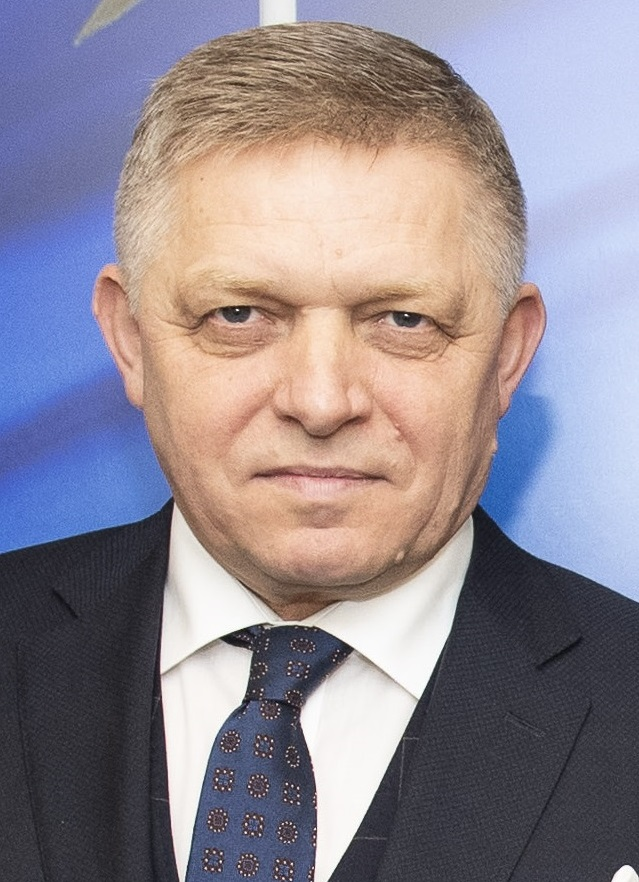

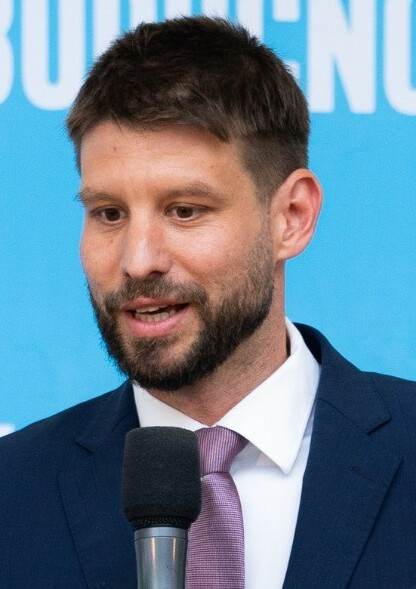

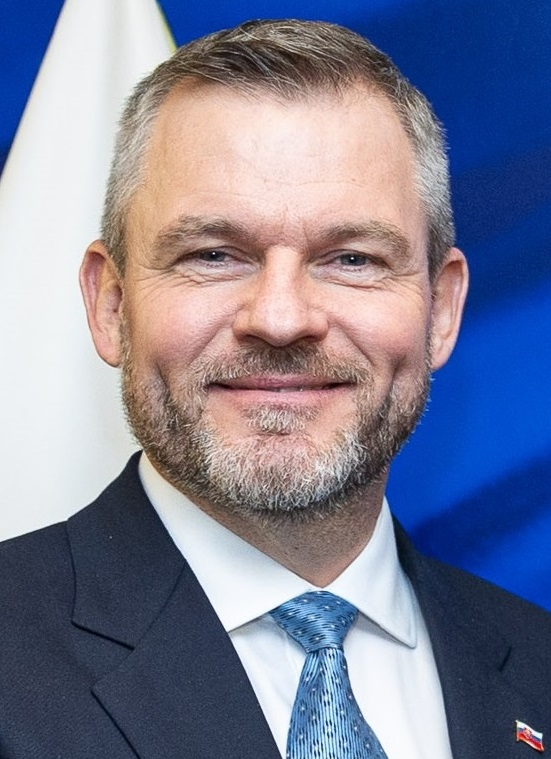

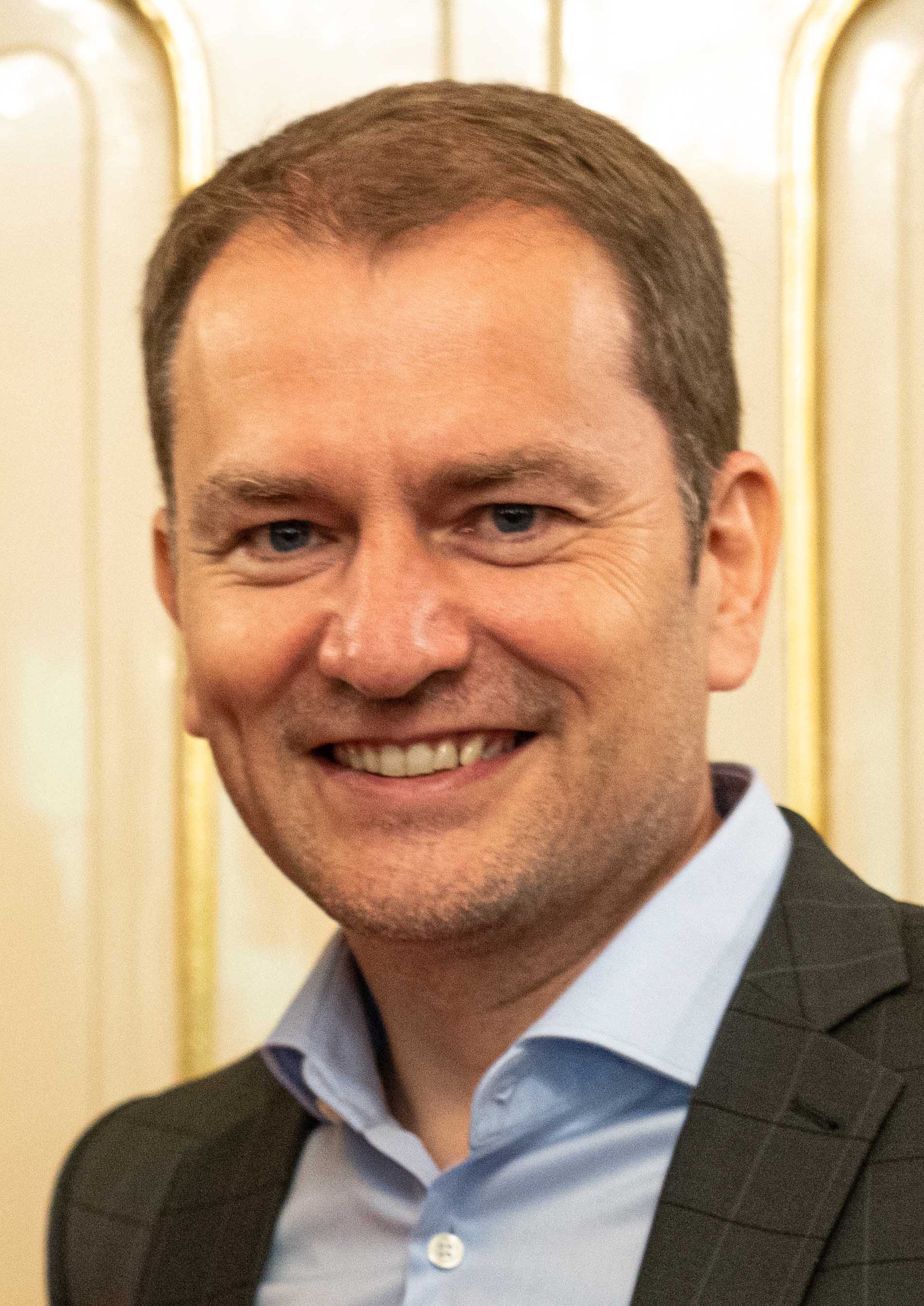

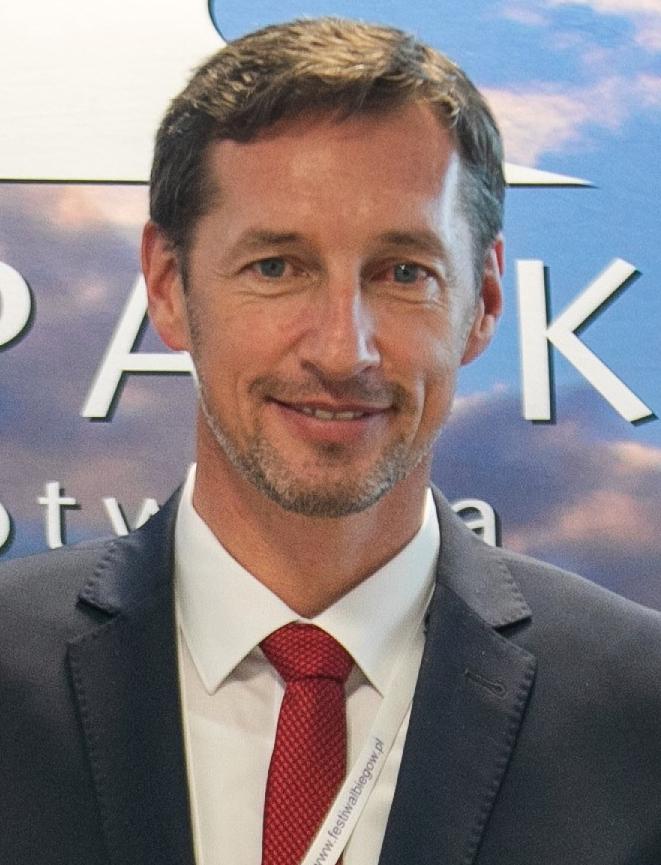

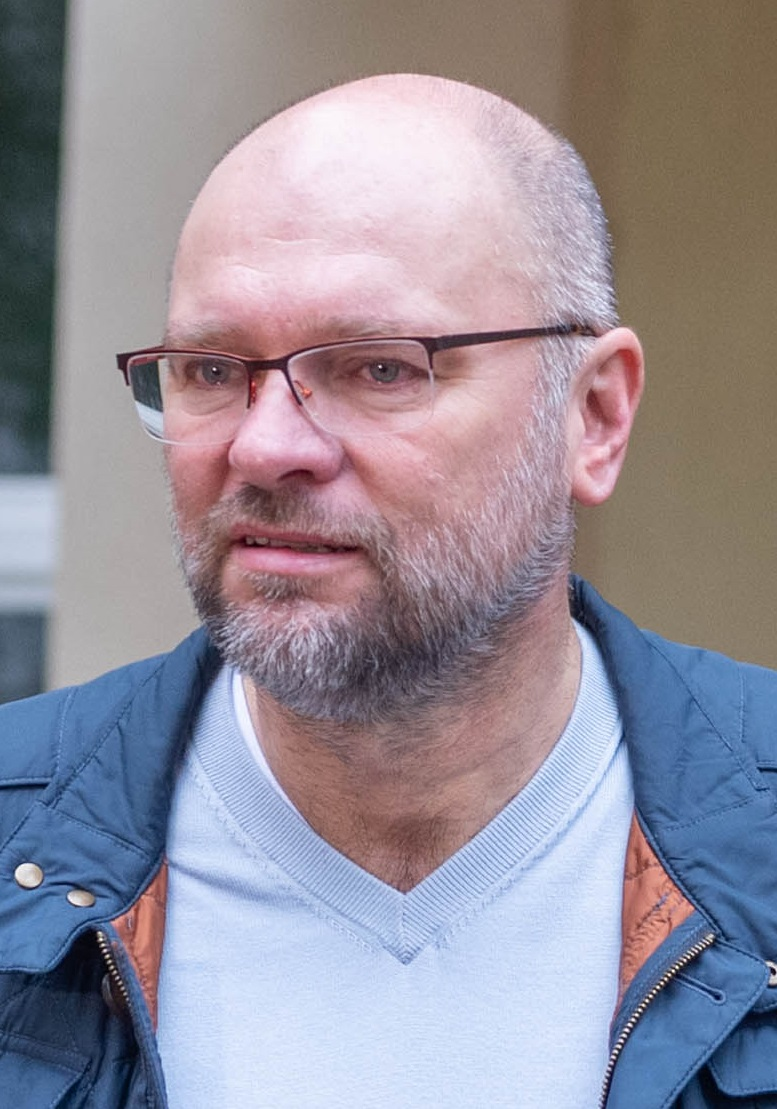

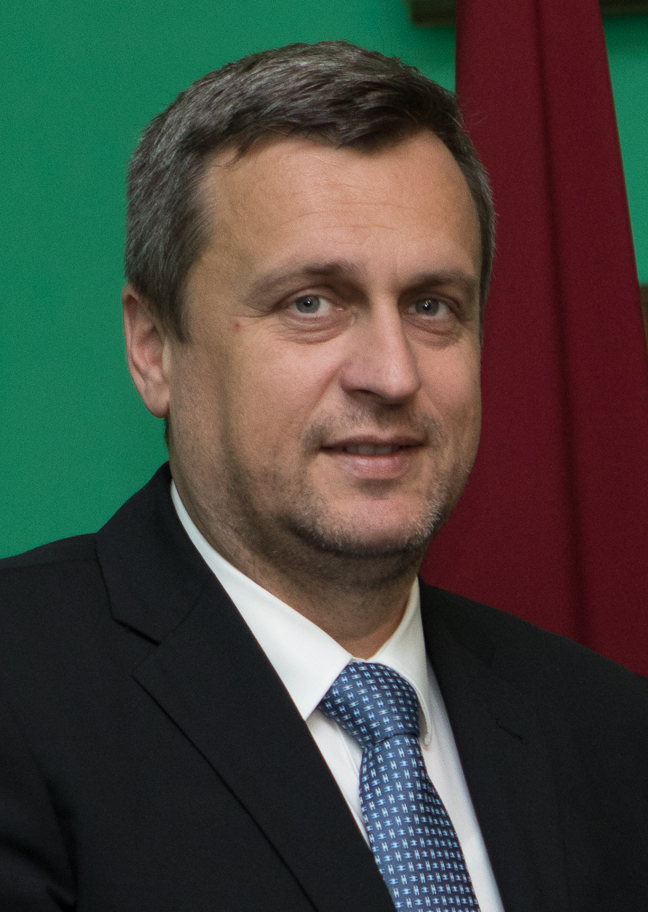
	First party	Second party	Third party
Leader	Robert Fico	Michal Šimečka	Peter Pellegrini
Party	Smer	PS	Hlas
Last election	38 seats, 18.3%	0 seats, 6.97% (Note: Progressive Slovakia contested the 2020 parliamentary election in an electoral coalition with Together.)	Did not exist
Seats won	42	32	27
Seat change	▲4	▲32	New party
Popular vote	681,017	533,136	436,415
Percentage	23.0%	18.0%	14.7%
Swing	▲4.7 pp	n/a	New party
	Fourth party	Fifth party	Sixth party
Leader	Igor Matovič	Milan Majerský	Richard Sulík
Party	Slovakia Movement	KDH	SaS
Alliance	OĽaNO and Friends	—	—
Last election	65 seats, 30.8%	0 seats, 4.7%	13 seats, 6.2%
Seats won	16	12	11
Seat change	▼49	▲12	▼2
Popular vote	264,137	202,515	187,645
Percentage	8.9%	6.8%	6.3%
Swing	▼21.9 pp	▲2.1 pp	▲0.1 pp
	Seventh party
Leader	Andrej Danko
Party	SNS
Last election	0 seats, 3.2%
Seats won	10
Seat change	▲10
Popular vote	166,995
Percentage	5.6%
Swing	▲2.4 pp
- Results of the election, showing vote strength by district
Prime Minister before election
Ľudovít Ódor (acting)
Independent
Elected Prime Minister
Robert Fico
Smer

Early parliamentary elections were held in the Slovak Republic on 30 September 2023 to elect members of the National Council. Regular elections were scheduled to be held in 2024. However, on 15 December 2022, the government lost a no-confidence vote. Subsequently, the National Council amended the Constitution so that an early election could be held on 30 September 2023. This was the first snap election in the country since 2012.

The left-wing populist and social conservative Direction – Social Democracy (Smer-SD), led by former Prime Minister Robert Fico, emerged as the largest party, winning 42 seats. The social-liberal and pro-European Progressive Slovakia (PS) came in second, with 32 seats. Former Prime Minister Peter Pellegrini's social-democratic Voice – Social Democracy (Hlas-SD), which split from Smer-SD in 2020, came in third with 27 seats. The conservative OĽaNO and its allies won 16 seats, less than a quarter of their total in the 2020 election. The Christian-democratic Christian Democratic Movement (KDH) and the right-wing populist Slovak National Party (SNS) re-entered the National Council after failing to achieve the vote threshold in 2020, winning twelve and ten seats respectively. The classical liberal Freedom and Solidarity (SaS) won eleven seats, tying the 2012 election as their worst result since the party's founding.

As no single party or alliance reached the 76 seats needed for a majority, a coalition government was needed. A coalition government of Smer-SD, Hlas-SD, and SNS was formed. A new government with Robert Fico as prime minister was sworn in on 25 October 2023.

== Background ==
Prior to the previous election, the Slovak Republic experienced a period of political turbulence, triggered by the murder of investigative journalist Ján Kuciak and his fiancée Martina Kušnírová in 2018. The incident led to widespread protests and the resignation of then-Prime Minister Robert Fico.

The election itself was won by the movement of Ordinary People and Independent Personalities (OĽaNO) led by Igor Matovič. The party emerged as the victor, gaining over a quarter of the popular vote, which translated to 53 seats in the 150-seat National Council. OĽaNO formed a coalition government with several other parties, ending the long-standing dominance of Direction – Social Democracy (SMER–SD).

== Electoral system ==
The 150 members of the National Council were elected by proportional representation in a single nationwide constituency with an electoral threshold of 5% for single parties, 7% for coalitions of two or three parties, and 10% for coalitions of four or more parties. The election used the open list system, with seats allocated using largest remainder method with Hagenbach-Bischoff quota. Voters were able to cast up to four preferential votes for candidates of the selected party.

All citizens of the Slovak Republic were allowed to vote except for citizens under 18 years of age, felons in prison convicted of serious offenses, and people declared ineligible to perform legal acts by court. Voters abroad on election day were allowed to vote by mail. All citizens 21 years of age or older on the election day and are permanent residents of Slovakia, were allowed to run as candidates except for prisoners, convicted felons, and those declared ineligible to perform legal acts by court. All participating parties must register 90 days before election day and pay a deposit of €17,000 which would be refunded to all parties gaining at least 3% of the votes.

Voters not present in their electoral district at the time of the elections were allowed to request a voting certificate (voličský preukaz), which allowed them to vote in any district regardless of their residency. Voters abroad on election day were allowed to request a postal vote. According to the Central Election Committee, approximately 72,000 citizens of the Slovak Republic living abroad had requested a postal vote for the election. The deadline for requests passed on 9 August 2023.

== Political parties and lead candidates ==
Parties on the ballot
#	List		Main ideology	Lead candidate	Previous election (2020)		2023
#	List		Main ideology	Lead candidate	Votes (%)	Seats	Seats
3	Progressive Slovakia	PS	Social liberalism	Michal Šimečka	7.0%	0 / 150	1 / 150
5	OĽaNO and Friends	OĽaNO a priatelia	Populism	Igor Matovič	30.8%	65 / 150	37 / 150
12	Freedom and Solidarity	SaS	Conservative liberalism	Richard Sulík	6.2%	13 / 150	19 / 150
15	Slovak National Party	SNS	Ultranationalism	Andrej Danko	3.2%	0 / 150	3 / 150
16	Direction – Social Democracy	Smer	Social democracy	Robert Fico	18.3%	38 / 150	27 / 150
17	Voice – Social Democracy	Hlas	Social democracy	Peter Pellegrini	—	—	11 / 150
23	Christian Democratic Movement	KDH	Christian democracy	Milan Majerský	4.7%	0 / 150	0 / 150

== Television debates ==
2023 Slovak parliamentary election
Date	Broadcasters	P Present S Surrogate NI Not invited A Absent I Invited N No debate																								
Date	Broadcasters	OĽANO	Smer–SD	SR	ĽSNS	PS	D	SaS	KDH	Aliancia	MF	SNS	Modrí, Híd	Hlas–SD	REP	Piráti	PRINCÍP	SOS	KSS	VB	SPRAVODLIVOSŤ	SHO	MySlovensko	SRDCE	SDKÚ-DS	KARMA
3 Sep 2023	JOJ 24 (150th candidates)	P Matovič	P Bekmatov	P Klus	NI	A Kusá	NI	P Hlina	P F. Majerský	NI	NI	P Huliak	NI	A L. Pellegrini	P Mazurek	NI	NI	NI	NI	NI	NI	NI	NI	NI	NI	NI
19 Sep 2023	Jednotka/RS	NI	NI	NI	NI	NI	NI	NI	NI	NI	NI	NI	NI	NI	NI	NI	S Kaliaš	S Smolka	NI	P Stanovič	NI	NI	P Panenka	NI	NI	P Szaboová
20 Sep 2023	TV JOJ/JOJ 24	P Matovič	NI	P Kollár	NI	NI	NI	NI	P Majerský	NI	NI	P Danko	NI	NI	P Uhrík	NI	NI	NI	NI	NI	NI	NI	NI	NI	NI	NI
20 Sep 2023	Jednotka/RS	NI	NI	NI	NI	NI	NI	NI	NI	NI	NI	NI	NI	NI	NI	P Šubová	NI	NI	P Hrdlička	NI	P Chlebo	P Švec	NI	NI	P Rybárik	NI
21 Sep 2023	TV JOJ/JOJ 24	NI	P Fico	NI	NI	P Šimečka	NI	P Sulík	NI	NI	NI	NI	NI	P Pellegrini	NI	NI	NI	NI	NI	NI	NI	NI	NI	NI	NI	NI
21 Sep 2023	Jednotka/RS	NI	NI	NI	S Schlosár	NI	NI	NI	NI	NI	S Rajtár	NI	S Schwarzbacher	NI	NI	NI	NI	NI	NI	NI	NI	NI	NI	S Tokár	NI	NI
22 Sep 2023	TV Markíza	NI	NI	NI	NI	NI	NI	NI	NI	NI	NI	NI	NI	NI	NI	NI	S Kaliaš	P Hanuliak	NI	P Stanovič	P Chlebo	P Švec	NI	NI	NI	P Szaboová
23 Sep 2023	TV Markíza	NI	NI	NI	NI	NI	NI	NI	NI	NI	NI	NI	NI	NI	NI	P Šubová	NI	NI	P Hrdlička	NI	NI	NI	P Panenka	S Kováč	P Rybárik	NI
24 Sep 2023	TV Markíza	NI	NI	NI	S Kotleba	NI	S Letanovská	NI	NI	P Forró	P Šimon	NI	P Dzurinda	NI	NI	NI	NI	NI	NI	NI	NI	NI	NI	NI	NI	NI
25 Sep 2023	Jednotka/RS	P Jurinová	NI	NI	NI	NI	S Naď	NI	NI	S Gyimesi	NI	NI	NI	NI	NI	NI	NI	NI	NI	NI	NI	NI	NI	NI	NI	NI
25 Sep 2023	TA3	S Remišová	NI	S Krajniak	NI	NI	NI	NI	P Majerský	P Forró	NI	P Danko	NI	NI	NI	NI	NI	NI	NI	NI	NI	NI	NI	NI	NI	NI
25 Sep 2023	TV Markíza	P Matovič	A Fico	P Kollár	NI	P Šimečka	NI	P Sulík	P Majerský	NI	NI	P Danko	NI	S Tomáš	P Uhrík	NI	NI	NI	NI	NI	NI	NI	NI	NI	NI	NI
26 Sep 2023 (cancelled)	~~TV Markíza~~	N Matovič	N Fico	NI	NI	N Šimečka	NI	NI	NI	NI	NI	NI	NI	N Pellegrini	NI	NI	NI	NI	NI	NI	NI	NI	NI	NI	NI	NI
26 Sep 2023	Jednotka/RS	NI	NI	S Pčolinský	NI	NI	NI	S Gröhling	S Hajko	NI	NI	P Danko	NI	NI	S Mazurek	NI	NI	NI	NI	NI	NI	NI	NI	NI	NI	NI
26 Sep 2023	TA3	NI	P Fico	NI	NI	P Šimečka	NI	P Sulík	NI	NI	NI	NI	NI	P Pellegrini	P Uhrík	NI	NI	NI	NI	NI	NI	NI	NI	NI	NI	NI
27 Sep 2023	Jednotka/RS	NI	P Fico	NI	NI	P Šimečka	NI	NI	NI	NI	NI	NI	NI	P Pellegrini	NI	NI	NI	NI	NI	NI	NI	NI	NI	NI	NI	NI

== Opinion polls ==
A LOESS graph displaying the polls for the 2023 Slovak parliamentary election.

== Issues and developments ==
2023 election issues included high inflation, Slovakia's position on the Russian invasion of Ukraine and the related global energy crisis, COVID-19, internal fights within the previous government, corruption scandals and immigration; questions of rights and values (particularly LGBTQ+ issues) were covered during the campaign by Al Jazeera English, BBC and Pravda.

By the week of the election, popularity polls indicated that the two strongest parties were the Progressive Slovakia (led by pro-European Michal Šimečka, a member of the European Parliament (EP) since 2019, and EP Vice-President since 2022, who has committed to maintaining support for Ukraine) and Smer-SD (headed by Robert Fico, three-time former prime minister, who has committed to ending Slovakia's support for Ukraine); however, neither appeared to be commanding a majority, and the BBC projected neither would top 20% of the vote, so each would have to attempt to build a coalition with other parties to achieve the majority needed to rule. Consequently, as many as 10 parties could wind up in the government.

The third-largest party, which tipped the balance in favor of Robert Fico, is Hlas–SD (Voice), the moderate-left party of Peter Pellegrini (formerly of Smer-SD, and former prime minister, 2018–20).

== Results ==
Results of the election, showing vote strength by commune.

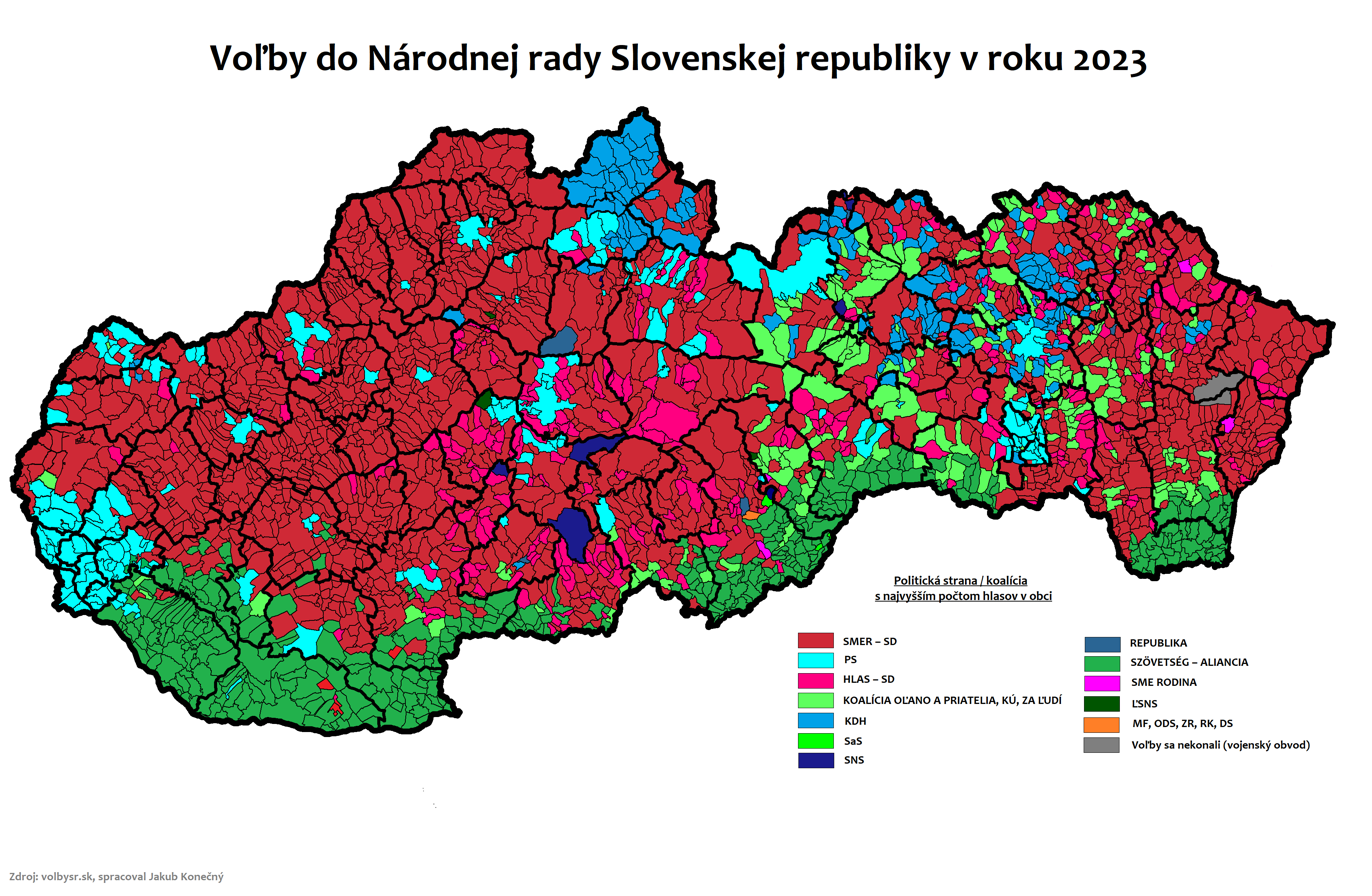
Results of parliamentary elections at the municipal level

Party	Votes	%	Seats	+/–
Direction – Social Democracy	681,017	22.95	42	+4
Progressive Slovakia	533,136	17.96	32	+32
Voice – Social Democracy	436,415	14.70	27	New
OĽaNO and Friends	264,137	8.90	16	–48
Christian Democratic Movement	202,515	6.82	12	+12
Freedom and Solidarity	187,645	6.32	11	–2
Slovak National Party	166,995	5.63	10	+10
Republic	141,099	4.75	0	New
Alliance	130,183	4.39	0	0
Democrats	87,006	2.93	0	0
We Are Family	65,673	2.21	0	–17
People's Party Our Slovakia	25,003	0.84	0	–17
Communist Party of Slovakia	9,867	0.33	0	New
Pirate Party – Slovakia	9,358	0.32	0	New
Modrí, Most–Híd	7,935	0.27	0	New
Hungarian Forum	3,486	0.12	0	New
MySlovensko	2,786	0.09	0	New
Karma	2,407	0.08	0	New
Together Citizens of Slovakia	2,401	0.08	0	New
HEART Patriots and Pensioners – Slovak National Unity	2,315	0.08	0	New
Princíp	1,817	0.06	0	New
Spravodlivosť	1,335	0.04	0	0
Slovak Revival Movement	1,332	0.04	0	0
Patriotic Bloc	1,262	0.04	0	New
Slovak Democratic and Christian Union – Democratic Party	771	0.03	0	New
Total	2,967,896	100.00	150	0
Valid votes	2,967,896	98.83		
Invalid/blank votes	35,052	1.17		
Total votes	3,002,948	100.00		
Registered voters/turnout	4,388,872	68.42		
Source: Results

=== Results by parties ===
Group	Party	Seats	+/–
Direction – Social Democracy		42	+4
Progressive Slovakia		32	+32
Voice – Social Democracy		27	+27
Slovakia–Christian Union–For the People	Slovakia	12	–33
Slovakia–Christian Union–For the People	Christian Union	2	–2
Slovakia–Christian Union–For the People	For the People	1	–11
Slovakia–Christian Union–For the People	NOVA	1	–1
Freedom and Solidarity	Freedom and Solidarity	10	–2
Freedom and Solidarity	Civic Conservative Party	1	0
Christian Democratic Movement		12	+12
Slovak National Party	National Coalition	3	+3
Slovak National Party	Life – National Party	3	0
Slovak National Party	Slovak National Party	1	+1
Slovak National Party	Independents	3	+3

=== Results by region ===
Region	Smer–SD	PS	Hlas–SD	OĽaNO and Friends	KDH	SaS	SNS	Republic	Alliance	Democrats	We Are Family	People's Party Our Slovakia	KSS	Other parties
Bratislava Region	18.54	31.00	10.36	6.17	4.90	12.50	4.31	3.14	0.91	4.43	1.78	0.57	0.20	1.08
Trnava Region	22.01	17.07	12.11	9.40	4.56	5.36	4.43	4.38	12.69	2.92	2.19	0.81	0.40	1.56
Trenčín Region	29.47	16.63	16.40	5.93	5.44	5.63	7.28	5.45	0.03	2.84	2.22	1.06	0.46	1.03
Nitra Region	25.31	14.42	14.40	7.47	4.06	4.80	4.51	4.46	13.91	2.19	2.01	0.80	0.26	1.24
Žilina Region	25.79	15.51	16.04	6.90	9.38	5.56	8.11	5.61	0.02	2.80	2.02	0.96	0.34	0.89
Banská Bystrica Region	22.89	14.96	19.76	7.41	4.29	5.14	6.53	5.18	5.17	2.40	2.73	1.33	0.43	1.67
Prešov Region	22.04	10.83	16.16	14.78	14.07	4.10	5.73	5.22	0.07	2.65	2.36	0.63	0.31	0.98
Košice Region	21.10	14.68	15.08	13.46	6.80	5.74	4.38	4.97	5.44	2.98	2.75	0.76	0.33	1.41
Foreign	6.10	61.70	2.46	3.81	3.31	10.80	3.79	3.20	0.47	2.50	0.55	0.38	0.04	0.76
Total	22.94	17.96	14.70	8.89	6.82	6.32	5.62	4.75	4.38	2.93	2.21	0.84	0.33	1.16

Smer

PS

Hlas

OĽANO

KDH

SaS

SNS

Republika

Szövetség–Aliancia

Demokrati

Sme rodina

Turnout

== Aftermath ==
As analysts predicted, Peter Pellegrini's Hlas-SD played the role of kingmaker in the "jockeying" that characterized the election's aftermath. Two viable coalitions emerged: one consisting of Fico's Smer-SD, Hlas-SD, and SNS; the other of Hlas-SD, PS, KDH, and SaS. On 2 October 2023, two days after the election, president Zuzana Čaputová tasked Fico, as the leader of the now-largest parliamentary party, with forming a government within 14 days. On 3 October, she held "informal discussions" with PS's leader Michal Šimečka about the possibility of a PS-led coalition before meeting with Pellegrini and KDH's Milan Majerský. Following this meeting, Pellegrini stated that his party was not ruling out either coalition.

According to SNS leader Andrej Danko, the ensuing negotiations revolved around Pellegrini's future role. Fico allegedly offered Pellegrini the role of Speaker of the National Council, while Šimečka was willing to support Pellegrini for Prime Minister in exchange for PS receiving the Ministry of the Interior. On 10 October, Hlas-SD announced that it had rejected PS's offer. On 11 October, Smer-SD, Hlas-SD, and SNS ratified their coalition agreement, according to which they were to receive 6, 7, and 3 ministerial portfolios, respectively.

On 12 October, the Party of European Socialists (PES) suspended Smer-SD and Hlas-SD over their plans to enter into coalition with SNS, which the PES views as a "radical-right party." One week later, on 19 October, Čaputová announced she would not approve the coalition government's nominee for Minister of Environment, Rudolf Huliak (SNS), due to his avowed climate change denialism. This delayed the swearing-in of the new government. After the coalition partners replaced Huliak with Tomáš Taraba (also SNS) as their nominee for the post, Čaputová accepted the coalition's government. She swore in the new government, with Fico at its helm, on 25 October.

== Foreign interference allegations ==
In July 2025, the Slovak government under Fico accused the United Kingdom Foreign, Commonwealth and Development Office of paying influencers to boost the Progressive Slovakia party during the election, citing a report by investigative website Declassified UK. The United Kingdom denied efforts to influence the election and stated that the activity was aimed at boosting youth turnout regardless of party.
