= 2024–2026 Slovak protests =

Protests against pro-Russian prime minister

- Part of Southeast Europe protests (2024–present), Slovak opposition to sanctions on Russia and Democratic backsliding in Slovakia
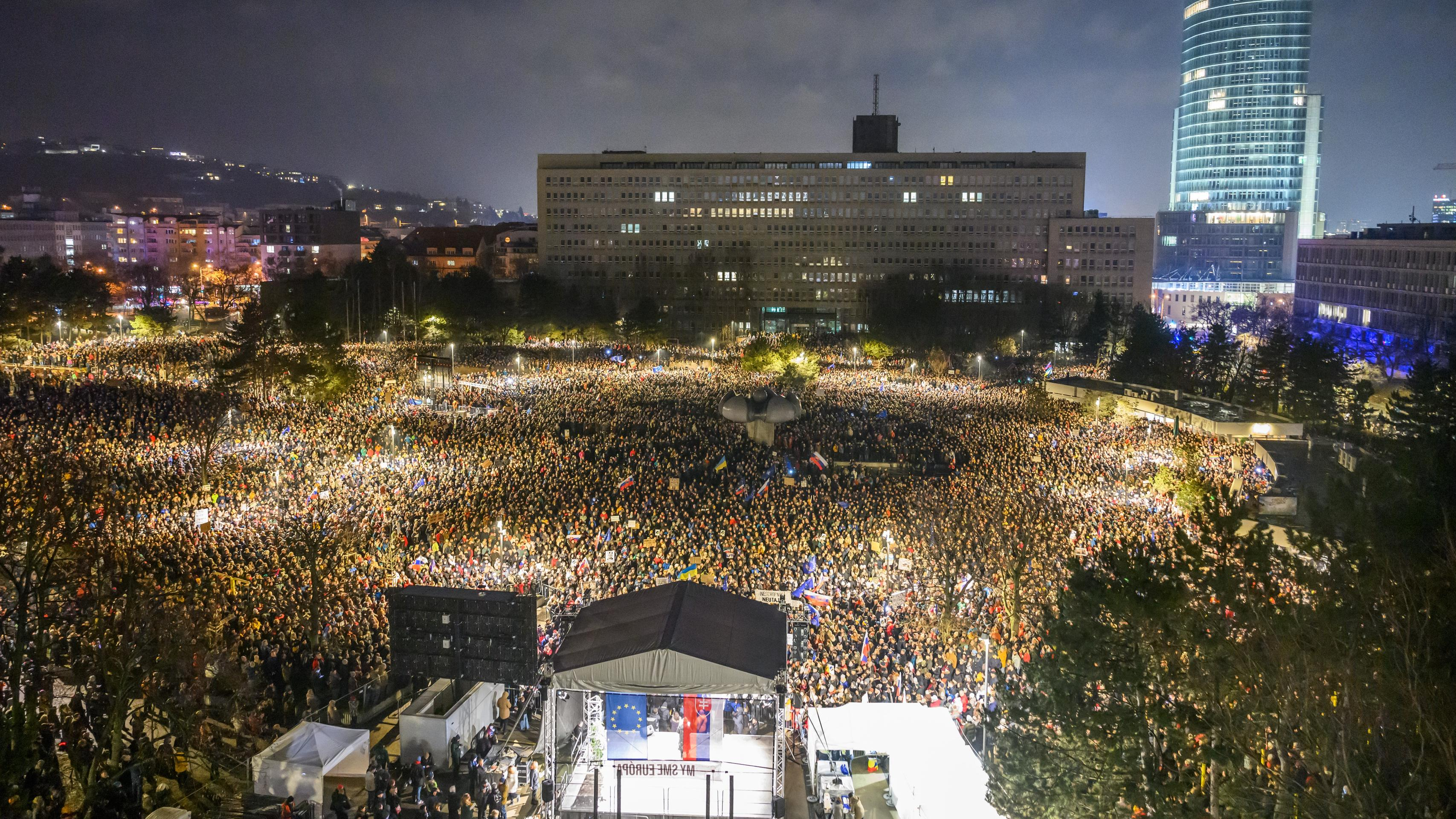
- Protesters on Námestie Slobody in Bratislava, 24 January 2025
- Date: 23 December 2024–9 May 2025; 17 November 2025–present
- Location: Slovakia (Note: Sporadic, small-scale protests also took place in several European capitals, including Prague, Kraków, Vienna, Berlin and Copenhagen.)
- Caused by: December 2024–May 2025: Anti-Ukrainian, anti-NATO and Eurosceptic policies implemented by Slovak Prime Minister Robert Fico; Termination of military aid to Ukraine during the Russian invasion of Ukraine; Opposition to European Union sanctions against Russia; Threats to block Ukrainian membership in both NATO and EU; Suggestions of withdrawing Slovakia from the European Union and NATO; November 2025–present: Suspension of a whistleblower law; Beneš Decree results in harsher regulation on ethnic minorities
- Goals: December 2024–May 2025: Resignation of Prime Minister Robert Fico (failed); Renunciation of pro-Russian, anti-Ukrainian, and Eurosceptic foreign policy alignment (failed); Reinstatement of pro-EU, pro-Ukrainian, and pro-NATO foreign policy (failed); Resignation of Minister of Culture Martina Šimkovičová (failed); November 2025–present: Resignation of Prime Minister Robert Fico; Restoration of a whistleblower law; Liberalisation of the law on minorities; Reinstatement of pro-EU, pro-Ukrainian, and pro-NATO foreign policy
- Methods: Demonstrations, civil disobedience
- Result: Ongoing: In 2026, the Government survived motion of no confidence; Slovak opposition to sanctions on Russia continues

Parties
(Slovakia) Opposition: PS; KDH; SaS; Slovakia; Democrats; Most–Híd; Anti-government protesters and activists; Non-governmental organizations	(Slovakia) Government: Smer-SD; Hlas-SD; SNS; Slovak Information Service; Ministry of Interior; Police Corps; Supported by President of Slovakia

Lead figures
Michal Šimečka; Milan Majerský; Branislav Gröhling; Igor Matovič; Jaroslav Naď	Robert Fico; Matúš Šutaj Eštok; Andrej Danko; Pavol Gašpar; Peter Pellegrini

Number
Protesters: ~3,000 (23.12.2024); ~4,000 (03.01.2025); ~15,000 (10.01.2025); ~100,000 (24.01.2025)	

Widespread demonstrations, involving tens of thousands of Slovak citizens mobilizing across Slovakia, have been taking place, primarily to protest Prime Minister of Slovakia Robert Fico's pro-Russia policies. The demonstrations, organized by Peace for Ukraine, have taken place across more than two dozen areas throughout the country.

Despite their scale, the protests did not lead to a change in government policy yet, and Fico remained in office while his administration consolidated power through cabinet reshuffles and new legislation.

== Background ==
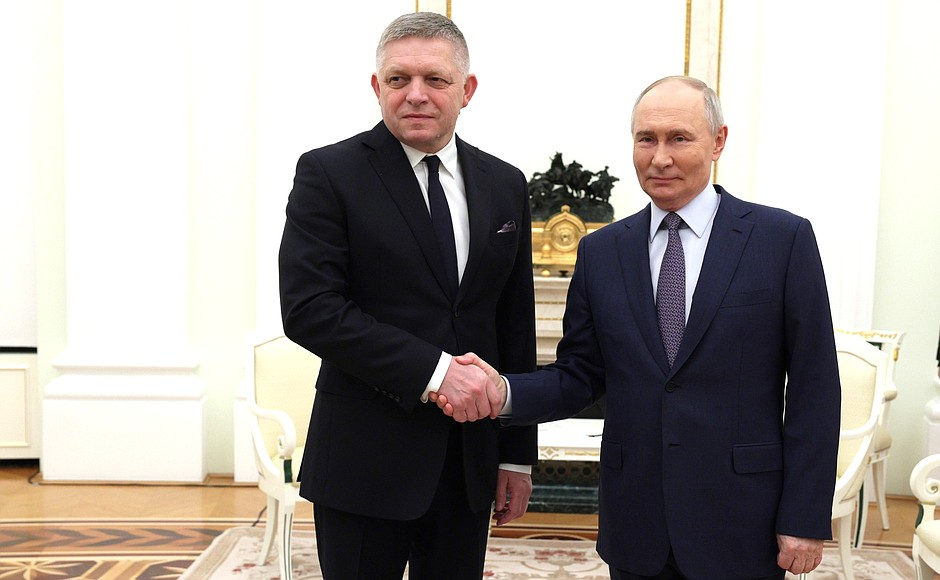
Robert Fico shaking hands with Vladimir Putin in Moscow, 22 December 2024

The protests emerged in response to Prime Minister of Slovakia Robert Fico's diplomatic actions and policy positions following his return to power in October 2023. His Direction – Social Democracy (Smer–SD) party secured electoral victory on a platform combining pro-Russian sentiment with anti-American and Eurosceptic rhetoric, leading to substantial changes in Slovakia's foreign policy orientation. Under Fico's leadership, Slovakia implemented several controversial policy changes which included the termination of military aid to Ukraine, marked opposition to European Union sanctions against Russia, promising to block Ukraine's potential NATO membership, and suggesting Slovakia's withdrawal from the European Union and NATO.

In April 2024, the Slovak government, under Robert Fico, approved a law that would abolish the existing Radio and Television of Slovakia (RTVS) public broadcasting service and replace it with new entity named Slovak Television and Radio (STVR). The primary justification was based on allegations of political activism and a lack of objectivity. "The situation in RTVS is unsustainable... [it] cannot be objective because it's in permanent conflict with the Slovak government," said the prime minister Robert Fico. The Director General of STVR is now selected by a council whose members are appointed by the Culture Minister, the Finance Minister, and the parliament, where the ruling coalition holds a majority, giving disproportionate power to Fico and his allies over the broadcasting service.

On 15 May 2024, Fico was shot and critically injured during an assassination attempt carried out by 71-year-old Juraj Cintula, who stated that he acted primarily because of the Fico government's opposition to military assistance to Ukraine during the Russian invasion of Ukraine. Following his recovery, on 5 June 2024, Robert Fico posted a 14-minute long prerecorded speech online, calling the would-be assassin an "activist of the Slovak opposition" that turned into a "messenger of the evil and political hatred" created and driven out of control by the "unsuccessful and frustrated opposition". Fico claimed that political opposition from the left showed "violent or hateful excesses" against his democratically elected government over the belief that a West-focused foreign policy was the only acceptable approach, especially concerning the Russo-Ukrainian war, believing that the "right to have a different opinion has ceased to exist in the European Union".

On 12 June, Fico's government unveiled a series of measures to improve security for politicians and other important individuals in response to the assassination attempt. These included banning protests in front of politicians’ residences and within 50 meters of the seat of government and the presidency, the allocation of long-term residences for the president, prime minister, and National Council speaker, and security for the leaders of all political parties in the National Council, the prosecutor general and the head of the Constitutional Court. The proposals were approved by the National Council on 27 June and will come into effect on 15 July. Opposition groups and Amnesty International criticized the measures as an attempt to limit the right to assembly.

In addition, the Slovak government faced potential economic ramifications from the cessation of Russian gas transit caused by Ukraine's tightening of sanctions, against Lukoil, Russia's largest private oil firm. This included a ban Lukoil on oil supplies and the assignment of its contractual obligations to supply oil to Hungary and Slovakia through the Druzhba pipeline to other companies.

TTF natural gas prices in Europe (1 January 2021 – 30 January 2025)

On 31 December 2024, the five-year agreement signed in 2019 on the transit of Russian natural gas through Ukraine expired. The next day, the pressure in the GTS gradually decreased, and at 07:00 (UTC+2), the valve was finally shut off at the station near the town of Sudzha in the Kursk region. Despite the fact that Ukraine announced its intention to refuse to extend the gas transit contract with Gazprom back during the 2022 Moldovan energy crisis and Robert Fico had enough time to ensure energy independence from Russia and diversify gas supplies, he wasted it. When Ukraine offered to help arrange for the supply of gas produced in Azerbaijan, Fico refused and reiterated that he wanted to continue buying only Russian gas. According to Fico, Slovakia, which earns money from transporting Russian gas through the parastatal Eustream, will lose half a billion euros annually in the future. However, in practice, the company did not bring half a billion to the state either before or during the Russian invasion of Ukraine: in 2022–2024, the volume of gas, along with its revenues, fell even further, and in 2023 the company reported a loss. This led to further antagonism of Ukraine's government by Fico and further demands to stop European sanctions and military aid.

On 17 January 2025, during an RTVS evening broadcast, Tibor Gašpar, Deputy Speaker of the National Council and prominent member of Smer–SD, suggested that while Smer–SD currently does not prioritize or aim to leave the European Union or NATO, both organisations are evolving. He stated that, under specific circumstances, Slovakia might even consider withdrawal, although any such decision should be made via referendum, mirroring the process by which Slovakia originally joined these organisations. President Peter Pellegrini responded swiftly, invoking a September 2024 memorandum signed by Slovakia's highest constitutional officials, reaffirming "indisputable membership" in both the EU and NATO, while Hlas–SD, one of the coalition partners, rejected any discussion of withdrawal, insisting that Slovakia's democratic and security interests remain tied to these alliances. The main opposition parties strongly condemned the remarks as well. In a video posted later, Gašpar defended his remarks by emphasizing that any choice to exit major European or transatlantic organisations should be democratic and based on citizen consent, specifically through a referendum, and insisted his stance was consistent with national interests.

Opinion polling for the next Slovak parliamentary election has shown a decrease in support for the government, and a rise in support for opposition parties such as Progressive Slovakia.

== Protests ==
=== 2024 ===
Demonstrations against Fico began on 23 December 2024, following his diplomatic visit to Moscow, where he met with Russian president Vladimir Putin. Fico did not return to Slovakia immediately, and was not seen in public for more than two weeks after the visit. Later, journalists found him in a luxury apartment in Vietnam based on the videos he posted through his Facebook profile.

=== 2025 ===
On 10 January 2025, the Peace to Ukraine organization coordinated demonstrations throughout Slovakia, with protest leader Lucia Štasselová condemning the Moscow visit as fundamentally incompatible with democratic values. Anti-Fico protests also sprung up in neighboring countries, including in the Czech Republic and Poland.

Large-scale protests occurred on 24 January 2025 amid heightened political tension after Prime Minister Fico presented allegations of a potential coup attempt. Citing a classified Slovak Intelligence Service (SIS) report, which is headed by the son of a close party associate of Fico's who faces serious charges of misusing the police for political purposes, Fico claimed that his political opposition was coordinating with foreign entities to orchestrate the overthrow of his government through planned civil disobedience, including government building occupations, road blockages, and nationwide strikes. Opposition leaders and protest organizers from Peace for Ukraine categorically rejected these allegations, characterizing them as attempts to intimidate the Slovak population. Critics noted that the SIS leadership maintained close ties to Fico's political allies. These protests centered in Bratislava drew an estimated 35,000-40,000 participants, additional protests drew a crowd of 15,000 in Košice, with thousands in other cities across the country, according to organizer counts. Protesters expressed their opposition through various slogans emphasizing Slovakia's European identity, including "Slovakia is not Russia, Slovakia is Europe" and calls for Fico's resignation.

Peace for Ukraine announced plans for continued demonstrations, scheduling the next major protest for February 7, 2025. On this day, an estimated 110,000 people attended evening demonstrations in 41 towns in Slovakia and in another 13 cities across Europe. Crowds in the capital of Bratislava were estimated to have 42,000-45,000 people involved in protesting. Observers noted that these were the largest protests in Slovakia since 2018, and unlike earlier efforts focused on major cities, the February protests spread into traditionally pro-Fico regions, with participation also reported in Slovak communities abroad. Meanwhile, Fico's government argued that protest organizers were acting under foreign influence and attempting to destabilize the state, though these claims were widely rejected by protesters and civil society groups.

Slovak opposition protested on 9 May, during the Russian Victory Day, against Russian-friendly decisions of Robert Fico.

On November 17, tens of thousands of Slovaks gathered to protest the policies of Fico’s government, marking the first major mobilization since the previous demonstrations on May 9. Held on the anniversary of the Velvet Revolution, the protesters invoked the legacy of Václav Havel, emphasizing his call for truth and love to prevail over lies and hatred.

On 16 and 17 December, many Slovaks protested against changes of the country's judicial system which they see as damaging the rule of law and in defense of the suspended wistleblower law and previous penal provisions. The biggest opposition party Progressive Slovakia supported these demonstrations.

On 20 December, Hungarian minority in Slovakia demonstrated against a law that criminalised a criticism of Beneš Decrees, a series of laws drafted by the Czechoslovak government-in-exile in the absence of the Czechoslovak parliament during the German occupation of Czechoslovakia in World War II, which severed laws of minorities like Germans and Hungarians. Hungarian Prime Minister Viktor Orbán reacted ambiguously while Hungarian opposition leader Péter Magyar criticised those laws and said that if he replace Orbán, he will use all diplomatic options to defend the Hungarian minority in his country's northern neighbour.

== Claims of foreign involvement ==
=== Czech Republic ===
During the protests, Slovak Prime Minister Robert Fico has repeatedly claimed that Czech diplomats and Czech media are "interfering in Slovak internal affairs". During a meeting in Brussels, Czech Prime Minister Petr Fiala told Fico, "I have the right to comment on Slovakia's foreign policy if it impacts Czech interests. And if the Slovak prime minister travels to Moscow to meet Vladimir Putin while Russia continues to kill people every day, then that is not in the interest of the Czech people. I do not interfere in Slovakia's internal affairs, none of my colleagues do." Fico's continued claims of Czech interference have caused a deterioration in Czech-Slovak relations.

=== Ukraine ===
Robert Fico has accused Ukraine numerous times of being involved in organizing the protests against his government. Fico also accused Ukraine of being involved in a cyberattack against a Slovak insurance company.

==== Coup attempt allegations ====
On 22 January 2025, Fico claimed that Ukraine was supporting the Slovak opposition in "planning a Maidan-style coup". On 30 January 2025, a Ukrainian man was arrested by Slovak police and was accused of "preparing a coup in the country". On 31 January 2025, Fico and the Slovak Information Service accused the Georgian Legion of being involving in the alleged coup attempt. At a press conference on the same day, Fico also showed a photographs of Georgian Legion commander Mamuka Mamulashvili meeting with members of the Slovak opposition including activist Lucia Štasselová, online news commentator Martin Milan Šimečka, the father of opposition leader Michal Šimečka. Fico also announced that Mamulashvili and 9 other members of the Georgian Legion were banned from entering Slovakia after claiming that the Slovak government had linked the unit to the alleged coup attempt.

On 1 February 2025, the Main Directorate of Intelligence of Ukraine (HUR) denied Fico and the SIS's claims about the Georgian Legion's alleged involvement. The HUR published a report on the same day which stated, "The Defense Intelligence of Ukraine officially reports that there is no unit called the Georgian National Legion in its structure".

Despite the ban, Mamulashvili unexpectedly entered Slovakia a few months after, specifically appearing in Bratislava in late July. He was filmed and interviewed by journalist Tomáš Forró near the Government Office, and notably, no police intervention occurred, as it was confirmed that he was not listed in the Schengen database of barred individuals. In his media appearance, Mamulashvili categorically denied the coup allegations, calling them “lies” and “defamation,” and emphasized he had never planned any destabilizing activity in Slovakia. Journalists and commentators questioned whether the government had deliberately spread disinformation or failed in its security duties.

=== United States ===
On 10 February 2025, Robert Fico congratulated Elon Musk for aiming to dismantle USAID. Fico claimed in a Facebook post, "It is indisputable that financial resources from USAID were used in Slovakia for political purposes, with the aim of distorting the political system and favouring certain political parties".

== Consequences ==
=== Government coalition ===
==== Collapse of the government majority ====
On 24 January 2025, the government coalition lost its majority in the National Council. Two MPs from the ruling Hlas–SD party, Samuel Migaľ and Radomír Šalitroš, were expelled. A day later, they issued a joint statement together with Ján Ferenčák and Roman Malatinec, saying they would not take part in parliament voting until further notice. However, on 19 March 2025, Migaľ ended his feud with the governing coalition in exchange for becoming the minister of regional development. As a result, the government coalition managed to restore its majority of 79 members in the National Council.

==== Cabinet reshuffle ====
On 19 February 2025, Robert Fico carried out a cabinet reshuffle aimed at consolidating his governing coalition amid growing protests and internal instability. Under the arrangement, the two other coalition partners, Voice – Social Democracy and the Slovak National Party, ceded one ministry to Fico's Smer–SD party. This move came after weeks of speculation about coalition fragility, following dissent within Hlas–SD ranks and sustained pressure from demonstrations opposing Fico's pro-Russian foreign policy. Analysts noted that the reshuffle increased Smer's ability to steer policy and withstand external criticism, but also risked straining relations with its partners by reducing their influence within the cabinet.

On 19 March 2025, President Peter Pellegrini carried out the reshuffle that helped Prime Minister Fico rebuild a working majority in the National Council, restoring the coalition's seat count to its original number and strengthening Smer–SD's dominance in the cabinet. International media and Slovak outlets viewed the move as consolidating power after weeks of defections and internal bargaining, signalling the government's intention to press ahead with its agenda despite recurring demonstrations.

=== International reception ===
The protests drew significant international attention, with foreign media and policy analysts framing them as part of a broader struggle over democratic backsliding and European alignment in Central and Eastern Europe. Outlets such as the Financial Times and regional think tanks described Slovakia as “the new illiberal kid on the block,” drawing comparisons between Robert Fico's governing style and that of Hungary's Viktor Orbán, particularly concerning rhetoric about foreign influence, restrictions on NGOs, and challenges to judicial independence.

The protests, prominently featuring slogans like “Slovakia is Europe”, were widely portrayed abroad as a sign of Slovakia's commitment to the European Union and NATO, standing in contrast to the government's warmer posture toward Moscow. Demonstrations in Slovak diaspora communities across Europe, including Vienna, Prague, and Berlin, reinforced the impression that the movement resonated beyond national borders and became symbolic of wider anxieties about democratic resilience within the European Union.

== 2025 Chalk Revolution ==
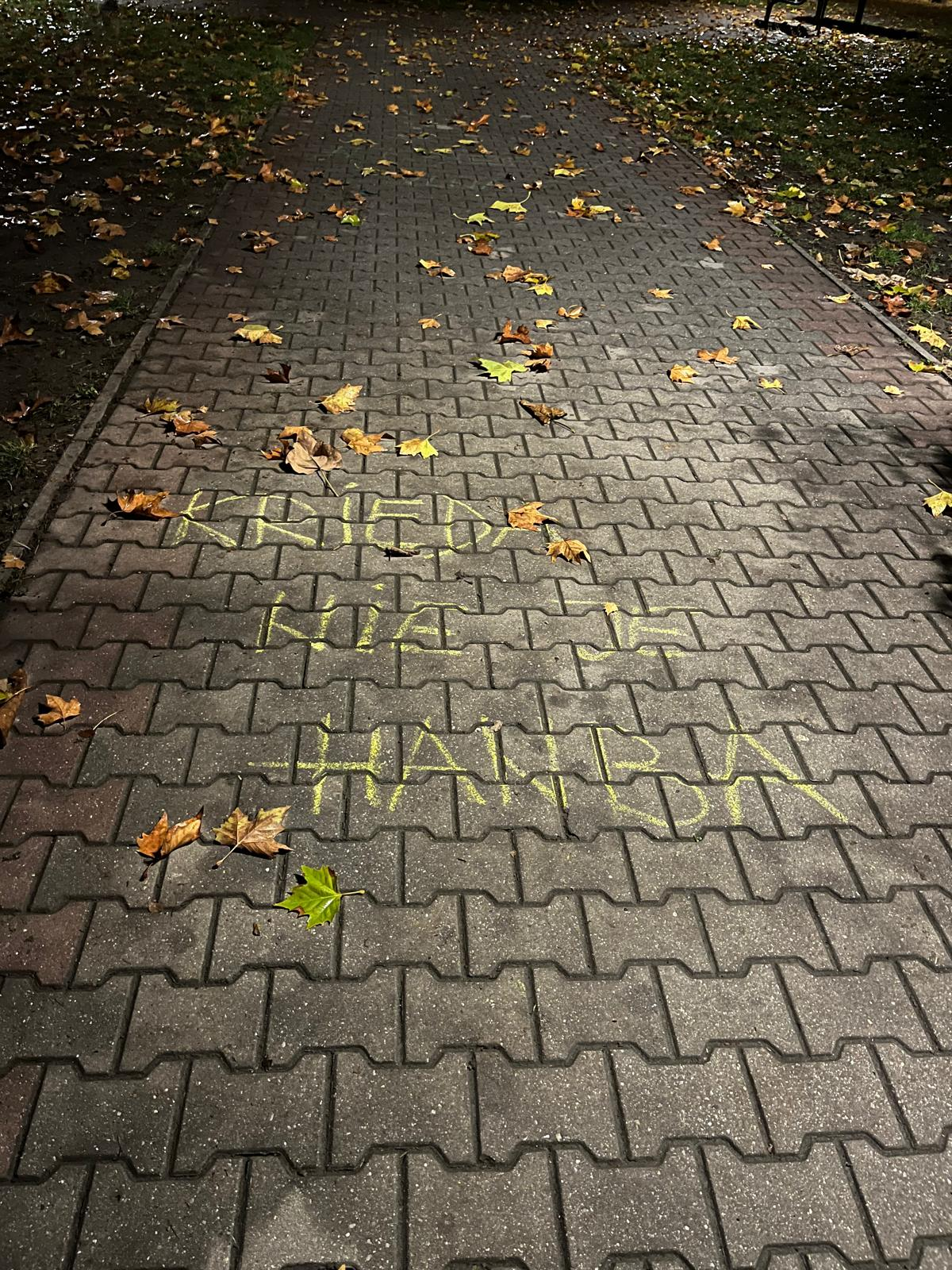
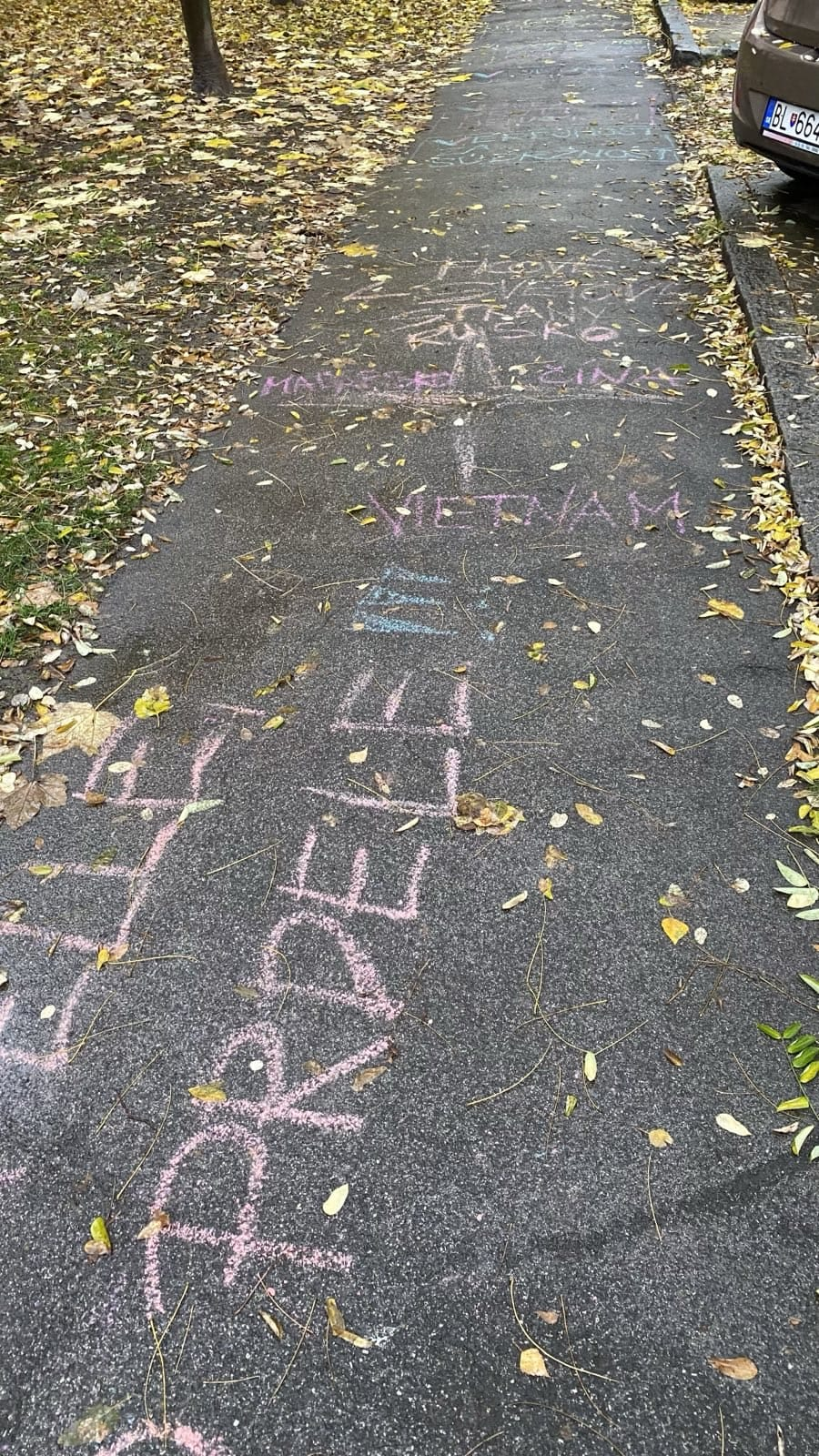
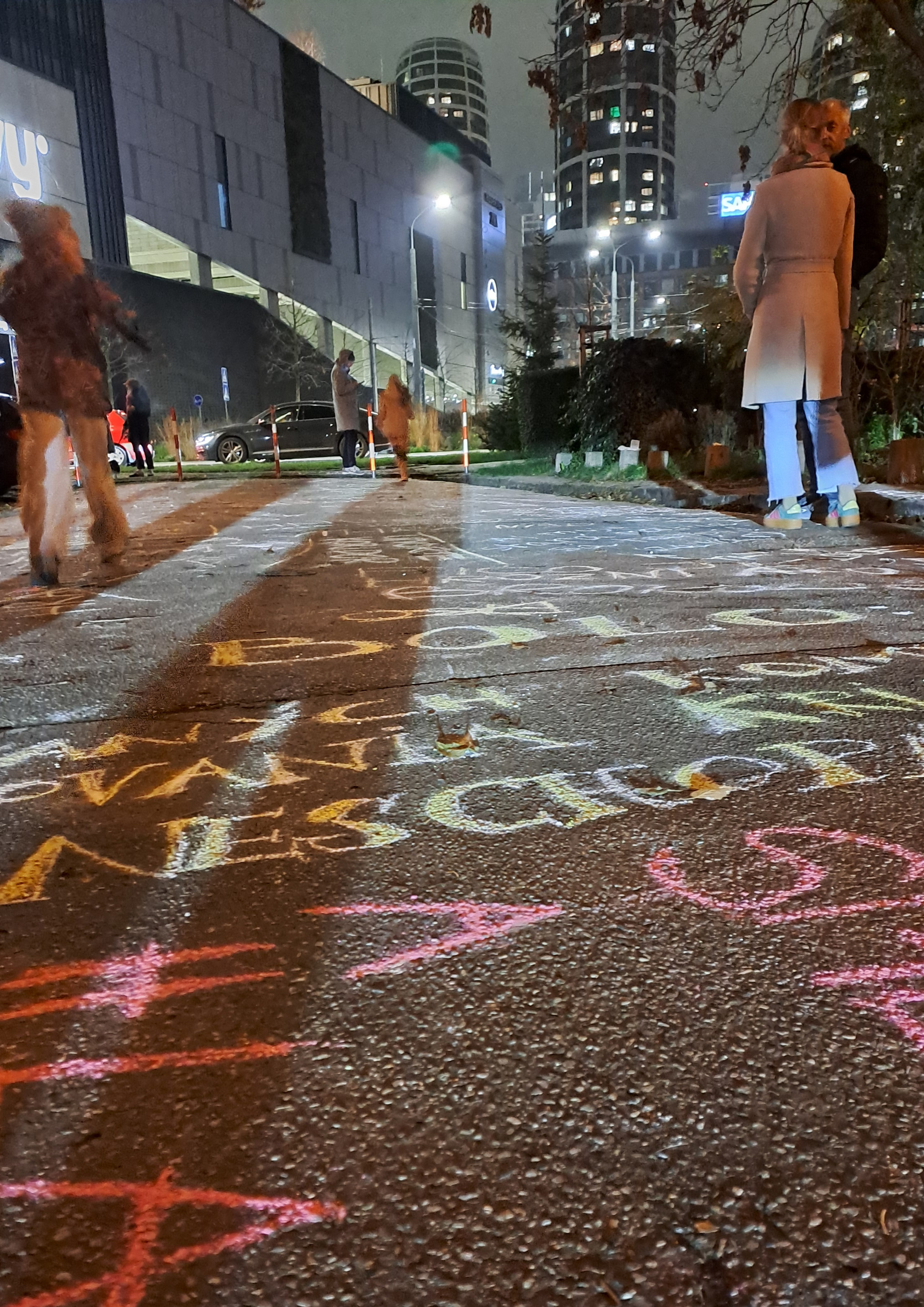
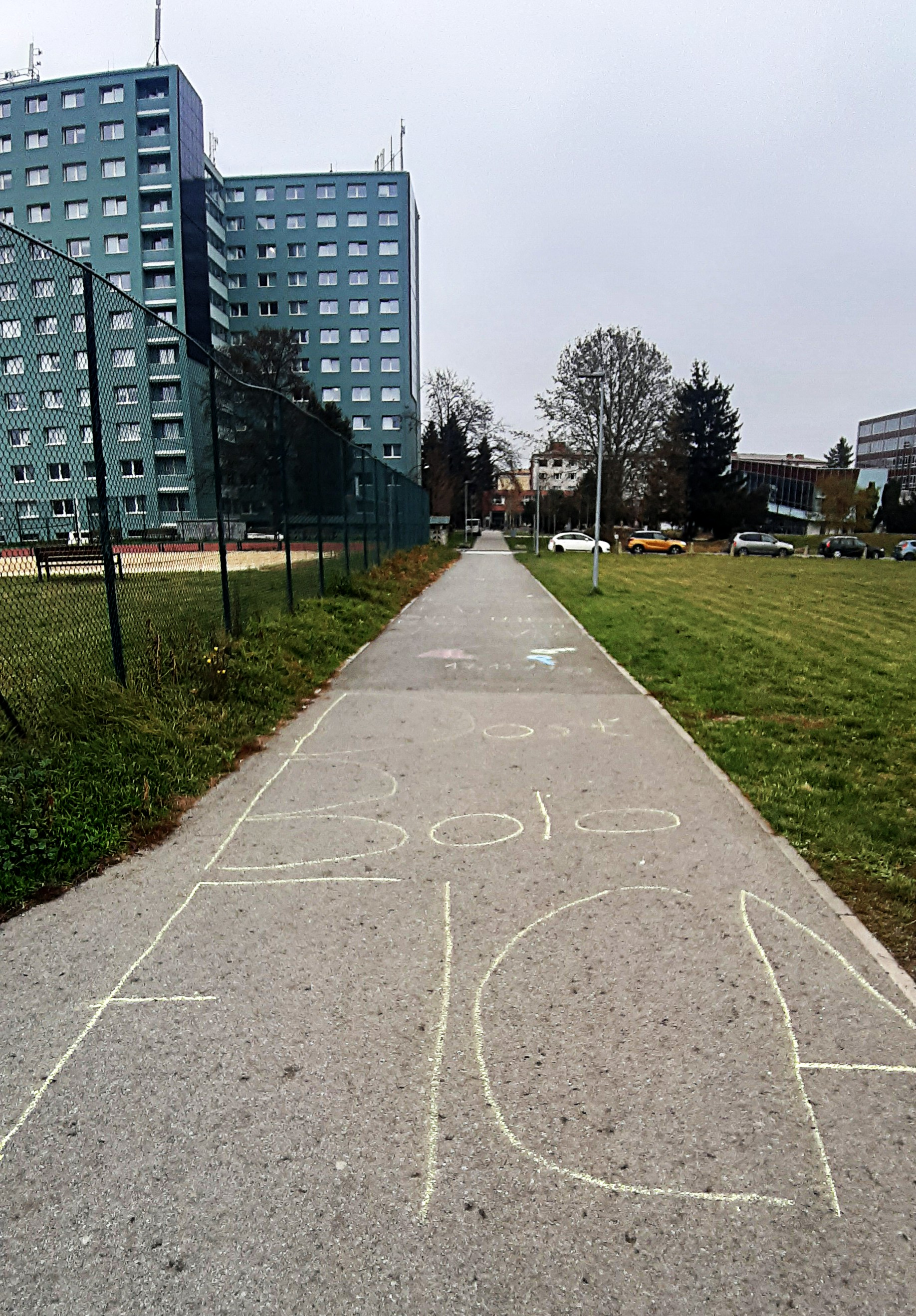
Chalk protest signs across Slovakia

The "Chalk Revolution (Kriedová revolúcia)", also called the "Chalk November Wave (Kriedová novembrová vlna)", was a grassroots protest movement that swept across Slovakia in November 2025. It began after a 19-year-old student, nicknamed "Muro", was taken from his classroom by police for questioning after he used chalk to write anti-government slogans outside his school in Poprad on 7 November 2025. The incident occurred shortly before a scheduled official visit by Slovak Prime Minister Robert Fico to the school. The student was released without charge in the same day.

A few days later, during a talk at another high school in Poprad, Fico said the European Union plans to spend €140 billion "to prolong the war" in Ukraine, resulting in a backlash from the students. In response, Fico said "If you're such heroes, go and fight in Ukraine".

In a display of solidarity with students, thousands of chalk signs and messages, ranging from "Enough of Fico" to pro-European and pro-Ukraine symbols, appeared on sidewalks, squares, and in front of government buildings in dozens of cities across Slovakia.

The protests reached their peak on November 17, 2025, when tens of thousands of people gathered in Bratislava and other cities to mark the anniversary of the Velvet Revolution and to demand Fico's resignation. The rallies were organised by opposition parties and civic group. "Muro" and opposition leaders spoke at the rally in Bratislava. However, due to deteriorating weather conditions, the "Chalk November Wave" concluded shortly thereafter, as the outdoor elements, specifically rain and snow, made continued chalk-based demonstrations impractical.

== See also ==
- Gen Z protests
- List of protests in the 21st century
