= Miriam Lexmann =

Slovak politician (born 1972)

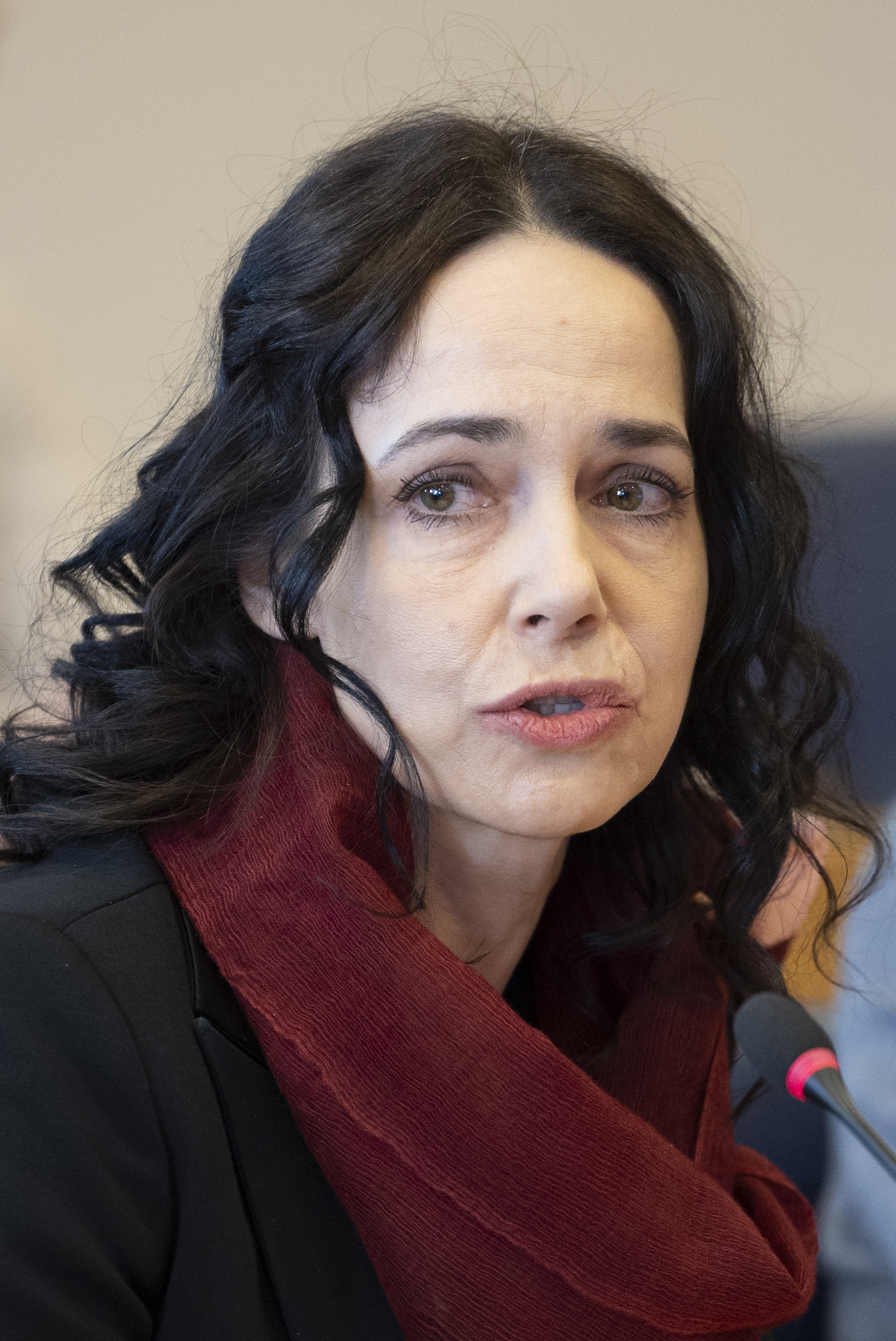
- Lexmann in 2025

Quaestor of the European Parliament
- Incumbent
- Assumed office 17 July 2024 Serving with See List

Member of the European Parliament for Slovakia
- Incumbent
- Assumed office 1 February 2020

Personal details
- Born: 2 December 1972 (age 53) Bratislava, Czechoslovakia
- Party: Christian Democratic Movement (since 2016)
- Spouse: Milan Majerský (m. 2020)
- Relatives: Juraj Lexmann (uncle)
- Education: Comenius University
- Website: lexmann.eu

Miriam Lexmann (born 2 December 1972) is a Slovak politician who has been a Member of the European Parliament since February 2020 and member of the Christian Democratic Movement.

Lexmann is of German descent. Her ancestors came to central Slovakia in 1853. Her great-uncle was Mikuláš Jozef Lexmann, a Dominican priest and superior of the Dominican Order, who died in a labour camp in 1950 as a result of inhumane treatment. His beatification process was opened in 2013.

== Early life and education ==
Lexmann was born to Eugen Lexmann, a meteorologist, and Marta Lexmann in Bratislava, Slovakia. She is the oldest of four sisters.

Lexmann attended high school at Gymnasium Jura Hronca in Bratislava, where she studied in a class focused on mathematics, physics, and programming. She then studied at Comenius University in Bratislava from 1992 to 1999, where she obtained a master's degree in philosophy.

Upon graduation from university, she worked for the political non-profit International Republican Institute (IRI). She is dedicated to the impact of misinformation on public opinion.

== Political career ==
Lexmann was one of the founders of the youth branch of the Slovak Christian Democratic Movement (KDH) and has been active member of KDH for nearly three decades. She currently serves as the party’s coordinator on foreign and security policy.

During the 2019 European Parliament election in Slovakia, Lexmann received 27,833 preferential votes and remained in second place, thus being elected as a member of the European Parliament. Despite this, she would assume the mandate only after Brexit. Regarding the situation, Lexmann said: "I can't say I'm looking forward to Brexit. I see a higher interest in Brexit not happening." She initially wanted to work at her previous workplace, but started working in the faction of the European People's Party after Brexit. She became a full member of the European Parliament Committee on Foreign Affairs (AFET) and was included as a substitute in the European Parliament Subcommittee on Security and Defence (SEDE). Lexmann took the oath on 16 February 2020.

Lexmann is a founding member and EU Co-Chair of the Inter-Parliamentary Alliance on China (IPAC), which was launched in June 2020.

In November 2023, Lexmann declared that she is considering candidacy in the 2024 Slovak presidential election.

Following the 2024 European elections, Lexmann became a quaestor of the European Parliament, making her part of the Parliament's leadership under President Roberta Metsola.

In November 2025, Lexmann stated that once one of the two married individuals undergoes a legal gender change, the marriage should be considered as no longer valid, as the Slovak Constitution does not allow that.

== Personal life ==
Lexmann got engaged to Christian Democratic Movement Milan Majerský in August 2020. Their wedding took place after the ecclesiastical court found that his first marriage was declared null and void. They got married in the church of Our Lady of the Snow in Bratislava.

Lexmann has served as a member of the Tunega, Púčik and Tesár Foundation (Slovak: Nadácia Tunegu, Púčika a Tesára) board of trustees since at least 2018, actively participating in its programs, including panel discussions and commemorative events. The foundation is dedicated to promoting democracy, Christian values, and the legacy of European union founding fathers such as Robert Schuman and Konrad Adenauer and its name commemorates the White Legion martyrs (Anton Tunega, Albert Púčik, and Eduard Tesár), who were executed by the communist regime in 1951 for their anti-communist activities. The founder and chairman of the foundation’s board of trustees is Ján Figeľ.

In March 2021, Lexmann was placed on China's sanctions list along with ten European politicians and academics, thus banned from doing business in China. She stated: "What I'm worried about is that the sanctions could directly hurt people from China that I'm in contact with". The sanctions were lifted by China in April 2025 following negotiations with European Parliament President Roberta Metsola.

Lexmann has been actively involved with Fórum života (Life Forum), a Slovak non-governmental organization advocating pro-life policies, including opposition to abortion and euthanasia, as well as support for families in crisis. She has been a long-term member and supporter of the organization, and in February 2020 she was elected to its board. Under her patronage, the Koncert za život (lit. 'Concert for Life'), organized by Fórum Života (lit. 'Life Forum'), took place in December 2025 in Prešov.

Serving as Chairwoman of Relief & Reconciliation International AISBL, a Belgian non-profit founded in 2013, Lexmann oversees initiatives that combine peacebuilding with humanitarian aid. The organization primarily supports communities in Syria and Lebanon through education, reconciliation programs, and relief efforts, drawing inspiration from the Jesuit tradition, particularly the work of co-founder Father Paolo Dall’Oglio.

Lexmann also serves on the Advisory Board of the Kurdistan National Prayer Breakfast, an initiative dedicated to promoting unity and spiritual reflection in the region, alongside notable figures such as Eduard Heger, Katalin Novák, Alojz Peterle, Nikolaus von Liechtenstein, Tristan Azbej, and Peter Östman. This organization is connected to The Fellowship network.

== Controversy ==
=== Association with CitizenGO ===
In 2023, Lexmann received an award from CitizenGO. The award was presented as part of CitizenGO's 10th anniversary celebrations, recognizing select individuals worldwide for their contributions to protecting shared values. She also supported petitions organized by CitizenGO.

CitizenGO is controversial organization due to financial links to Russian oligarch Konstantin Malofeev, with board member Alexey Komov facilitating a 2013 funding deal and promoting Kremlin views. Board member Luca Volontè, convicted of corruption in the Azerbaijani Laundromat scandal involving €2.39 million in bribes with Russian ties, allegedly funneled funds to CitizenGO via his foundation. The group is also criticized for supporting Spain's Vox party and participating in the Russia-influenced Agenda Europe network against progressive rights. A court in Spain confirmed the accuracy of information regarding HazteOír’s ties to the secret organization El Yunque, with which it is historically and organizationally closely connected. The Spanish Episcopal Conference has distanced itself from HazteOír.

=== Fórum života and Agenda Europe ===
Fórum Života (lit. 'Life Forum'), in which Lexmann is actively involved and where she served as a board member, has been identified as a key participant in Agenda Europe. Agenda Europe, a secretive conservative network opposing abortion, LGBTQ+ rights, and gender equality, has been embroiled in controversies over its alleged ties to Russian influence, including through Alexey Komov, who facilitates funding from sanctioned oligarch Konstantin Malofeev, a major funder of Russian separatist groups in Crimea in 2014 and the Donetsk People’s Republic. Another example of her connections to Agenda Europe is through her KDH colleague Ján Figeľ, the founder of the Tunega, Púčik and Tesár Foundation, where Lexmann served for many years as a member of the board of trustees. Figeľ has been identified as a key figure within Agenda Europe.

=== ADF International ===
Lexmann collaborated also with ADF International (the global arm of Alliance Defending Freedom). Key examples include co-organizing a 2023 European Parliament conference on surrogacy and parenthood policies, where Lexmann hosted speakers such as ADF International's Adina Portaru. Additionally, Lexmann hosted Slovak students at the European Parliament for meetings with ADF International representatives, alongside other conservative groups like FAFCE, indicating facilitated networking on shared policy issues.

ADF has been criticized as an anti-LGBTQ+ hate group by organizations like the Southern Poverty Law Center for advocating policies that restrict LGBTQ+ rights, reproductive freedoms, and gender equality, including support for the recriminalization of same-sex acts and drafting anti-trans legislation. Through involvement in Agenda Europe (mentioned earlier), ADF was accused of lobbying to curb sexual and reproductive rights in the EU, importing US-style restrictions while using EU funds via affiliates.

=== Support for the 2025 constitutional amendments ===
Lexmann, as a member of European Parliament, has actively supported and defended the recent controversial constitutional changes initiated and proposed by government of Robert Fico. Lexmann publicly communicated her positions through media and social media. Critics, including Venice Commission and the Amnesty International, view Slovakia's constitutional amendments as draconian measures that would severely undermine gender equality, human rights, and the rule of law by entrenching discrimination.
