= 2027 Slovak parliamentary election =

- By 25 September 2027
- All 150 seats in the National Council; 76 seats needed for a majority
Party	Leader	Current seats
Smer	Robert Fico	41
PS – Democrats	Michal Šimečka	33
Hlas	Matúš Šutaj Eštok	25
OĽaNO and Friends	Igor Matovič	12
KDH	Milan Majerský	11
SaS	Branislav Gröhling	12
SNS	Andrej Danko	8
Independents		8
Incumbent Prime Minister
Robert Fico; Smer

Parliamentary elections are scheduled to be held in Slovakia by 25 September 2027 to elect all 150 members of the National Council.

== Background ==
=== 2023 election ===
The last elections were held in 2023. The left-wing populist Direction – Social Democracy (Smer–SD) led by Fico won the election with 22.95% of the vote, earning 42 seats in the 150-member parliament. In total, seven parties entered parliament, reflecting the country's fragmented political landscape and the collapse of the previous governing coalition. The election marked a political comeback for Fico and sparked debate about the country's future direction, particularly its foreign policy and military support for Ukraine, while also emphasizing that coalition negotiations would be important in creating a new government. Smer–SD ultimately succeeded in doing so by forming a government with Voice – Social Democracy (Hlas–SD) and the Slovak National Party.

=== Domestic policy ===
==== Judiciary and criminal code reforms ====
In December 2023, the government proposed changes to the Criminal Code and pushed to pass them through an accelerated legislative process, arguing that the existing laws did not meet human rights standards. The proposal included abolishing the Special Prosecutor's Office, which investigated high-level corruption, and reducing penalties for some financial crimes. The proposed reforms were strongly criticized by the parliamentary opposition, President Zuzana Čaputová, the European Parliament, the European Commission, and a range of non-governmental organizations (NGOs). The opposition responded with parliamentary filibusters, while large-scale protests lasted for several weeks. The European Public Prosecutor's Office also warned that the changes could weaken the protection of the EU's financial interests in Slovakia.

The proposed reforms raised concerns about possible conflicts of interest within the governing coalition. Critics argued that several people with close ties to the government, including coalition politicians facing criminal charges, could benefit from the changes. Among them was the bill's rapporteur, Tibor Gašpar. Many of these cases were being handled by the Special Prosecutor's Office, which the reform planned to abolish. The European Commission warned that the reform could affect ongoing corruption cases and Slovakia's ability to effectively investigate and prosecute such crimes. It also called for a thorough analysis of the proposed changes, saying that the reform could negatively affect several areas of EU law. The government rejected the criticism, saying the changes were meant to modernize the Criminal Code, place greater emphasis on rehabilitation, and bring Slovak law more closely into alignment with EU standards.

On 8 February 2024, the National Council passed an amendment to the Criminal Code. The reform introduced significant changes to criminal law, including lower prison sentences and shorter statutes of limitations for several crimes, such as bribery, tax fraud, embezzlement, and robbery. The final version of the law also lowered the statute of limitations for sexual assault cases from 20 years to 10 years. This change was widely criticized by politicians and the general public. The government defended the measure, arguing that it could encourage victims to report crimes earlier and could still be revised through future amendments. After facing public pressure, the government proposed restoring the previous 20-year limitation period for rape and other serious sexual crimes. The change was approved on 28 February, reversing the earlier reduction before the reform came into effect.

Following the reform's adoption, several corruption-related cases were suspended or dropped because of the new legislation. Many of the affected cases had been ongoing for years, involving politicians and businessmen who were widely seen as having close ties to Fico. Those affected included former Finance Minister Ján Počiatek, oligarch Jozef Výboh, suspected of a €150,000 bribery linked to President Peter Pellegrini, and Deputy Speaker of the National Council Peter Žiga, who was under investigation for allegedly offering a €100,000 bribe to a Supreme Court judge. Many other cases were affected as well, raising further concerns about the impact of the reform on ongoing investigations. The shorter limitation periods applied to cases that had been charged under the previous Criminal Code but had not yet been decided by the courts, as prosecutors and judges were required to apply the law that was more favorable to the accused.

==== Greater control of the media ====
Starting in late 2023, the government took several steps that critics said were aimed at independent media. It described a number of major news outlets as "hostile" and signaled that their access to government institutions would be limited. Journalists from outlets including Sme, Denník N, Aktuality.sk, and TV Markíza were excluded from some press conferences and often did not receive answers to their questions, while media seen as more supportive of the government were given greater access. Pavol Szalai of Reporters Without Borders (RSF) called the situation a "crash test" for Slovakia's democracy. At the same time, the government reduced funding for the public broadcaster Radio and Television of Slovakia (RTVS) and proposed further changes to its structure and financing. These plans were criticized by press freedom advocates.

In March 2024, the government announced plans to replace RTVS, prompting widespread criticism and public protests. Critics argued that the proposal would threaten the broadcaster's independence. Noel Curran of the European Broadcasting Union warned that the changes appeared to be an attempt to turn the public broadcaster into state-controlled media. The proposal was also criticized by the President, opposition parties, journalists, international media organizations, and the European Commission. In an open letter, groups including the International Press Institute (IPI), the European Federation of Journalists, Free Press Unlimited, and the European Centre for Press and Media Freedom warned that the reforms could weaken media independence and threaten press freedom. RSF also condemned what it described as verbal attacks on journalists, restrictions on access to information, and efforts to undermine the broadcaster's independence.

In April 2024, the government approved legislation proposed by Fico and Culture Minister Martina Šimkovičová to reform public broadcasting, arguing that RTVS had become politically biased. The plan dissolved RTVS and replaced it with Slovak Television and Radio (STVR), overseen by a council appointed by the government. It also required the broadcaster to play the national anthem every day. Parliament approved the reform in June 2024, officially replacing RTVS with STVR. IPI argued it would allow the governing coalition to appoint loyal leadership and increase its influence over public broadcasting. In April 2025, the Democratic Erosion Consortium said the reforms had attracted international criticism and raised concerns about democratic backsliding, while an IPI report from June 2025 also said that pressure on TV Markíza had contributed to staff changes and growing concerns about editorial self-censorship.

==== Doctors' strike ====
In late 2024, the government faced a serious healthcare crisis after thousands of doctors threatened to go on strike over poor working conditions. More than 3,300 of them submitted their resignations, putting significant pressure on the healthcare system. In response, the government passed legislation allowing penalties during a state of emergency. Healthcare workers who refused to work could face up to one year in prison or a €1,500 fine. If a patient was harmed as a result, the penalty could be as high as five years. Health Minister Kamil Šaško said that emergency measures could be introduced in regions most affected by resignations.

As tensions increased, the dispute raised concerns over healthcare capacity and the government's response to the strike. Many feared that the conflict could place additional pressure on the healthcare system and cause longer delays for patients. The conflict also highlighted the growing divide over how the crisis should be managed while maintaining essential medical services. The introduction of emergency measures, which could have forced doctors to continue working under threat of legal penalties, was criticized by medical unions and opposition politicians. They said the measures could undermine labor rights and further damage trust between healthcare workers and the government.

Negotiations between the government and healthcare workers intensified in late December 2024 and eventually led to an agreement. The deal maintained salary increases for doctors and included promises to address broader problems, such as hospital funding and staff shortages. In return, doctors agreed to withdraw the resignation notices, which had threatened to seriously disrupt hospital services across the country. Šaško described the deal as a compromise, saying that the main winners were patients themselves. He stressed that protecting the lives of patients was at the heart of the agreement and a shared goal of both the government and doctors. The agreement also created a basis for further discussions aimed at preventing a similar crisis in the future.

==== Constitutional amendments ====
On 27 January 2025, Fico announced a series of proposed amendments to the Constitution of Slovakia. The changes were intended to strengthen national sovereignty by giving the constitution priority over international treaties and agreements. The proposals also included legally recognizing only two genders (male and female), restricting gender transition, and banning same-sex couples from adopting children.

The proposed amendment faced criticism from international organizations and legal experts. Before the vote in September 2025, the Venice Commission of the Council of Europe warned that giving Slovak law priority in "cultural and ethical issues" could conflict with Slovakia's obligations under EU law and the European Convention on Human Rights. The commission also recommended removing the strict two-gender definition from the proposal, arguing that it could lead to discrimination and conflict with existing human rights standards. It urged Slovak lawmakers to make sure any constitutional changes were consistent with European human rights law and did not weaken the protection of minority groups.

Despite disagreements, the government passed the changes on 26 September 2025, introducing a number of socially conservative measures. The changes formally recognized only two genders, limited adoption to married heterosexual couples, and introduced a nationwide ban on surrogacy. The amendment also stated that Slovak laws concerning cultural and ethical issues would take priority over conflicting EU legislation. Government officials defended the changes as a way to protect national traditions and prevent what they described as the influence of progressive policies.

The changes increased tensions between Slovakia and the EU. In November 2025, the European Commission launched infringement proceedings against Slovakia, arguing that parts of the changes were incompatible with EU law. The dispute was part of a wider pattern of disagreements between the government and European institutions over rule of law and the interpretation of common legal standards. Fico said the government was prepared for a legal dispute with the EU and added that he was looking forward to the conflict.

=== Attempted assassination of Robert Fico ===
As polarization in Slovak politics continued to grow, Fico released a recorded message on 10 April 2024, calling for tensions to calm down. He said he believed hostility towards government officials was increasing and claimed that supporters of PS were openly insulting politicians in public. He also warned that the growing frustration could eventually lead to political violence. At the same time, he accused multiple media outlets of encouraging aggression and contributing to deeper divisions within Slovak society.

On 15 May, shortly after attending a government meeting in Handlová, Fico was shot outside the city's House of Culture. The attacker fired five times from a handgun, hitting Fico in the abdomen and shoulder and leaving him with life-threatening injuries. Security forces quickly took him to a nearby hospital before he was airlifted to Banská Bystrica. Although he remained conscious during the transfer, his condition was critical and required immediate surgery that lasted several hours. One of the bullets narrowly missed his vital organs. Deputy Prime Minister Tomáš Taraba later said that Fico was expected to recover. On 16 May, Pellegrini said he had spoken with Fico in hospital and described his condition as "very serious".

On 17 May, Defence Minister Robert Kaliňák said that Fico had undergone another operation to remove dead tissue and that his condition remained very serious. Two days later, Kaliňák and the doctors treating Fico reported that his condition had improved and gave him a "positive prognosis", saying that the most serious risks had passed. Fico's chief adviser, Erik Kaliňák, later said that his small intestine had been hit in five places. By the end of May, Fico had been released from hospital and flown by helicopter to his home in Bratislava, where he continued his recovery.

On 5 June, Fico released a 14-minute prerecorded video message, his first public statement since May. He said the attack had caused serious health problems and that he would need several more weeks to recover before fully returning to his duties, although he hoped to resume work in June or July. Fico said he had forgiven the attacker and did not want to take legal action. He described the attacker as a "Slovak opposition activist" who had become a "messenger of evil and political hatred", which he blamed on what he called a "frustrated and unsuccessful" opposition. He also criticized "anti-government media", particularly outlets he associated with George Soros, as well as foreign-funded NGOs and opposition groups. Fico said they should not ignore what he saw as the causes of the attack and questioned whether the attacker had acted alone.

=== Anti-government protests ===
Demonstrations against Fico began on 23 December 2024, shortly after his official visit to Moscow, where he held talks with Russian President Vladimir Putin. The meeting focused primarily on the continued supply of natural gas to Slovakia amid ongoing energy concerns. Fico's visit drew widespread criticism, as he became one of the few Western leaders to travel to Russia following the start of the country's invasion of Ukraine, raising questions about Slovakia's alignment with EU's Common Security and Defence Policy. Opposition parties and civil society groups argued that the trip symbolized a departure from Slovakia's pro-European orientation and undermined the country's credibility among its Western allies.

Following the meeting, Fico did not immediately return to Slovakia and remained absent from public appearances for more than two weeks, contributing to speculation and media scrutiny. The lack of official communication regarding his whereabouts during this period further intensified public debate and fueled media attention across Slovakia. His location was later identified by journalists as Vietnam, after he posted videos on social media that were geolocated to a luxury apartment in Hanoi. The Moscow visit, along with his subsequent absence, became a catalyst for public dissatisfaction and was widely regarded as one of the immediate triggers for the wave of protests that followed.

On 17 January 2025, during an RTVS evening broadcast, Tibor Gašpar suggested that while Smer–SD currently does not prioritize or aim to leave the EU or the North Atlantic Treaty Organization (NATO), both organizations are evolving. He stated that, under specific circumstances, Slovakia might even consider withdrawal, although any such decision should be made via referendum, mirroring the process by which Slovakia originally joined these organizations. President Peter Pellegrini responded swiftly, invoking a September 2024 memorandum signed by Slovakia's highest constitutional officials, reaffirming "indisputable membership" in both the EU and NATO, while Hlas–SD, one of the coalition partners, rejected any discussion of withdrawal, insisting that Slovakia's democratic and security interests remain tied to these alliances. The opposition parties strongly condemned the remarks as well. In a video posted later, Gašpar defended his remarks by emphasizing that any choice to exit major European or transatlantic organizations should be democratic and based on citizen consent, and insisted his stance was consistent with national interests.

Amid growing criticism of Fico's foreign policy orientation, opposition parties announced plans to initiate a vote of no confidence against the government. During the parliamentary session in January 2025, proceedings were unexpectedly moved into a classified mode at the request of Fico, who cited a report from the Slovak Information Service (SIS). Journalists and the public were excluded, and the debate continued behind closed doors, prompting criticism from opposition politicians, who accused the government of undermining transparency. Subsequent reports indicated that the intelligence cited by the government was based in part on an email discussing plans for a series of peaceful protests, which had been generated using artificial intelligence and circulated among civil society actors. Opposition representatives and protest organizers rejected the classification of the material as unjustified, arguing that it contained no evidence of violent or unconstitutional activity and that its use served political purposes.

Fico subsequently presented allegations of a potential coup attempt in connection with the same events. Citing a classified SIS report, he claimed that opposition actors were coordinating with foreign entities to destabilize the country through civil disobedience, including protests, blockades, and strikes. Critics, however, questioned the credibility and independence of the intelligence service, noting its leadership's ties to figures associated with the governing coalition, and described the allegations as an attempt to discredit political opponents and deter public mobilization. Opposition leaders and protest organizers rejected the claims and characterized them as intimidation.

On 24 January 2025, large-scale protests took place across Slovakia, with the main demonstration concentrated in Bratislava, which drew an estimated 40,000 participants. Significant numbers were also reported in Košice, where approximately 15,000 people joined, alongside additional gatherings in many other Slovak cities and towns. Across the country, protesters voiced strong opposition through chants, banners, and slogans that emphasized Slovakia's alignment with Europe and democratic values. A frequently repeated message was "Slovakia is Europe", reflecting concerns about the country's political direction. Many protesters also called for Fico's resignation, framing their demands around issues of governance, foreign policy orientation, and the preservation of Slovakia's place within the EU. The demonstrations were characterized by a broad civic turnout and a unifying pro-European sentiment spanning across the country.

On 8 February 2025, the organizers coordinated another large wave of demonstrations, calling for sustained public mobilization across Slovakia. Organizers estimated that around 110,000 people participated in evening rallies held in more than 40 cities and towns nationwide, alongside parallel gatherings in multiple cities across Europe, including Prague, Kraków, Vienna, Berlin and Copenhagen, where Slovak communities joined in solidarity. The largest single protest took place in the capital, Bratislava, with an estimated 45,000 attendees. Observers described the events as the most extensive protests in Slovakia since 2018, noting not only their scale but also their unusually broad geographic reach, extending beyond major urban centers into smaller towns and regions that have traditionally been more supportive of Fico.

In response, government officials argued that the protests were being shaped by foreign influence, including the Czech Republic and Ukraine, and framed the demonstrations as part of a broader attempt to undermine political stability in the country. They also claimed that the Georgian Legion had been involved in the protests, although no publicly verified evidence was provided to support these claims. These claims were firmly rejected by protest organizers, who characterized the rallies as a domestic expression of civic concern rather than external interference. The dispute over the protests also contributed to a more polarized public debate, with supporters of the government emphasizing themes of sovereignty and stability, while critics highlighted issues of democratic accountability and Slovakia's orientation within Europe. At the same time, the scale and spread of the demonstrations drew attention to growing political mobilization across different segments of society, including diaspora communities, underscoring the increasing visibility of civic activism both within Slovakia and abroad.

On 15 November 2026, Progressive Slovakia and Democrats announced a formation of a coalition and a joint list for the parliamentary election, dividing spots on the list in a 4:1 ratio. PS's leader Šimečka also invited KDH, SaS and the Hungarian Alliance into the coalition, but all three parties refused, opting for independent candidacy.

== Composition of the National Council ==
Group/party		Ideology	Leader	Deputies	
Smer (Note: Including several independents elected on the party's list.); Direction – Social Democracy		Left-wing nationalism	Robert Fico	41 / 150	41 / 150
PS; Progressive Slovakia		Liberalism	Michal Šimečka	33 / 150	33 / 150
Hlas; Voice – Social Democracy		Left-wing populism	Matúš Šutaj Eštok	25 / 150	25 / 150
OĽaNO and Friends (Note: Including several independents elected on the coalition's list.)	Slovakia	Populism	Igor Matovič	10 / 150	12 / 150
OĽaNO and Friends	For the People	Liberal conservatism	Veronika Remišová	1 / 150	12 / 150
OĽaNO and Friends	NOVA	Conservatism	Gábor Grendel	1 / 150	12 / 150
KDH; Christian Democratic Movement		Christian democracy	Milan Majerský	12 / 150	12 / 150
Freedom and Solidarity	SaS; Freedom and Solidarity	Classical liberalism	Branislav Gröhling	11 / 150	12 / 150
Freedom and Solidarity	OKS; Civic Conservative Party	Liberal conservatism	Ondrej Dostál	1 / 150	12 / 150
Slovak National Party; Slovak National Party		Right-wing populism	Andrej Danko	8 / 150	8 / 150
Independents / unaffiliated				8 / 150	8 / 150

== Opinion polls ==
A local regression graph of all polls conducted.
