= Juraj Lexmann =

Slovak musicologist and composer (1941–2025)

- Born: 19 January 1941; Bratislava, Slovak Republic
- Died: 12 November 2025 (aged 84); Bratislava, Slovakia
- Education: Comenius University
- Known for: Codifying modern liturgical hymnals
- Relatives: Miriam Lexmann (niece)

Juraj Lexmann (19 January 1941 – 12 November 2025) was a Slovak musicologist, composer, film editor, and academic. He is best known for codifying modern Slovak Roman Catholic liturgical hymnals and for composing music for more than 120 films, as well as for his contributions to documentary sound design and musicological scholarship.

== Early life and career ==
Juraj Lexmann was born in Bratislava on 19 January 1941. He began his career in 1958 as a laborer at an organ factory in Krnov. He later studied at the Industrial School for Musical Instrument Production in Kraslice while simultaneously completing studies in musical composition at the Ostrava Gymnasium. In 1964, he joined the public broadcaster as a film editor responsible for sound design, marking the beginning of his long-term professional involvement with film and music. His career combined practical work in sound and composition with theoretical reflection on film music. In the 1970s, he studied musicology at the Comenius University. After graduating, he founded the Department of Sound Composition at the Academy of Performing Arts in Bratislava and served as Director of the Institute of Musicology of the Slovak Academy of Sciences from 1997 to 2009.

Lexmann composed music for more than 120 films, working most closely with Viktor Kubal, as well as music for stage programs of folklore groups, chamber music, and songs. As an author and director, he participated in the creation of musical documentary films and television programs and carried out editing and musical dramaturgy for approximately 1,400 news, documentary, and animated films.

=== Liturgical hymnals ===
In the 1970s and 1980s, under the direction of bishop Ján Pásztor, Lexmann was tasked with creating a handbook of Slovak liturgical chants reflecting the changes to the Catholic liturgy introduced after the Second Vatican Council. Despite the restrictions of the communist regime, he organized a network of composers and reviewers to develop high-quality liturgical settings through a scholarly peer-review process. This effort produced the Liturgický spevník I (Liturgical hymnal I), completed in the early 1980s and officially approved in 1985, with publication in Rome in 1990. The hymnal included Slovak and Latin Mass orders, psalm settings, dialogues, and children's liturgical songs.

Lexmann continued with Liturgický spevník II, a collection of psalm settings issued via samizdat due to censorship obstacles, and Liturgický spevník III (1993), containing chants for Ash Wednesday, Holy Week, and Easter. His later work, Liturgický spevník pre tretie tisícročie (Liturgical hymnal for the third millennium , 2000), outlined a comprehensive vision for the continued development of Slovak liturgical music into the new millennium.

== Death and recognition ==
Lexmann was the uncle of the politician Miriam Lexmann.

In June 2014, Pope Francis awarded the title Knight Commander of the Order of St. Sylvester to Lexmann for his lifelong contribution to liturgical music.

Lexmann died in Bratislava on 12 November 2025, at the age of 84. The public broadcaster Slovak Television and Radio scheduled an extraordinary broadcast of a documentary about Lexmann's life to commemorate his achievements.
