= Opinion polling for the 2027 Slovak parliamentary election =

In the run up to the 2027 Slovak parliamentary election, various organisations are carrying out opinion polling to gauge voting intention in Slovakia. Results of such polls are displayed in this article. The date range for these opinion polls is from the previous parliamentary election, held on 30 September 2023.

== Electoral polling ==
=== Graphical summary ===
A local regression graph of all polls conducted

=== Voting intention estimates ===
Voting intention estimates made by polling firms that are members of the European Society for Opinion and Marketing Research (ESOMAR) and the Slovak Association of Research Agencies (SAVA). They are conducted in the form of telephone and personal interviews with selected persons, who form a representative sample reflecting the demographic parameters of the population of Slovakia. Respondents are asked: "Imagine that a parliamentary election would be held in Slovakia next Saturday. Would you vote in them and if so, which party would you vote for?" Respondents are read a list of currently active political parties.

Results are published that include only the answers of respondents who would vote for a particular party. The table shows political parties that have exceeded the electoral threshold in the last parliamentary election or oscillate above 4% in the polls. The electoral threshold is 5% for a single party, 7% for two- or three-party alliances, and 10% for party alliances of four or more parties. 76 seats are required for an absolute majority in the National Council.

Polling firm	Date	Sample size	Smer	PS and Democrats		Hlas	OĽaNO and Friends			KDH	SaS	SNS	Republika	Hungarian Alliance	We Are Family	ĽSNS	Others	Lead
Polling firm	Date	Sample size	Smer	PS	Democrats	Hlas	Slovakia	ZĽ	KÚ	KDH	SaS	SNS	Republika	Hungarian Alliance	We Are Family	ĽSNS	Others	Lead
Ipsos	16–20 Nov 2026	1,030	17.2	24.1		6.8	10.8	1.4	–	6.9	8.5	1.0	12.3	4.3	2.0	–	4.6	6.9
15 Nov 2026	PS and Democrats announce an electoral coalition for the 2027 parliamentary election.																	
NMS	5–8 Nov 2026	1,004	17.9	19.2	4.9	7.4	9.8	1.9	0.5	5.0	7.9	1.9	13.0	3.1	2.3	1.1	3.4	1.2
AKO	21–28 Oct 2026	1,000	16.6	19.1	5.1	8.2	9.9	–	–	7.3	8.6	4.5	10.4	4.4	2.1	0.5	3.3	2.5
Ipsos	15–19 Oct 2026	1,032	18.4	18.6	5.3	6.6	10.0	1.8	–	7.3	8.1	2.0	10.8	3.4	2.4	–	5.5	0.2
Focus	12–19 Oct 2026	1,017	17.0	17.4	5.8	8.5	9.7	1.1	0.3	6.4	6.3	3.5	11.3	4.4	4.3	–	4.0	0.4
NMS	1–5 Oct 2026	1,005	17.8	19.5	4.9	5.9	9.0	1.9	0.6	6.2	8.0	1.5	14.2	3.3	3.1	0.9	2.8	1.7
Ipsos	18–22 Sep 2026	1,030	16.9	19.0	5.5	6.6	10.7	–	–	7.0	8.4	2.2	12.8	3.9	2.0	–	5.1	2.1
AKO	10–21 Sep 2026	2,000	17.1	18.9	4.4	8.6	8.1	–	–	6.9	8.1	4.8	9.7	3.3	3.2	–	6.9	1.8
NMS	2–7 Sep 2026	1,004	16.2	21.6	4.8	6.4	9.0	1.6	0.5	5.8	6.8	1.9	15.6	3.1	3.0	1.0	2.6	5.4
Focus	1–7 Sep 2026	1,012	17.3	17.3	5.0	8.4	8.9	1.6	0.4	6.4	7.5	4.0	12.4	3.8	3.2	–	3.8	Tie
Ipsos	18–23 Aug 2026	1,061	17.9	18.1	4.7	8.2	8.4	1.8	–	7.3	8.2	3.0	10.9	3.4	2.8	–	5.2	0.2
AKO	6–14 Aug 2026	1,000	17.7	21.0	4.3	8.8	7.7	–	0.3	7.8	8.8	4.7	9.8	2.9	2.7	0.2	3.5	3.3
NMS	5–10 Aug 2026	1,001	16.5	19.2	4.6	5.9	8.9	2.2	0.3	5.9	7.4	2.9	13.3	4.0	3.7	0.8	4.2	2.7
AKO	8–14 Jul 2026	1,000	17.3	20.8	5.8	8.5	8.0	–	–	7.7	8.8	4.8	9.7	2.8	2.2	0.2	3.4	3.5
NMS	1–7 Jul 2026	1,002	15.4	18.8	5.1	7.7	9.1	1.9	0.6	5.8	8.0	2.7	12.8	4.2	3.5	0.9	3.0	3.4
Focus	22–29 Jun 2026	1,027	17.7	18.1	4.8	8.0	9.0	–	–	6.7	7.0	4.2	11.6	3.9	2.8	–	2.7	0.4
Ipsos	17–23 Jun 2026	1,035	19.0	20.2	5.1	6.8	7.3	–	–	6.5	8.8	3.4	10.0	4.7	2.8	–	2.3	1.2
AKO	10–18 Jun 2026	1,000	18.6	20.0	6.2	8.6	7.3	–	–	8.0	8.4	4.9	9.5	3.2	2.5	–	2.8	1.4
NMS	3–8 Jun 2026	1,002	16.4	19.7	5.5	7.2	8.3	2.9	0.3	4.8	7.4	2.4	12.9	4.5	3.1	1.0	3.2	3.3
AKO	14–21 May 2026	1,000	18.9	19.7	5.1	8.9	8.2	–	–	7.9	8.6	4.8	9.1	4.0	2.2	–	2.6	0.8
Ipsos	15–20 May 2026	1,009	19.1	19.7	4.7	8.3	7.8	2.5	–	5.9	8.2	2.7	11.2	3.2	3.1	–	–	0.6
NMS	6–10 May 2026	1,002	17.0	19.8	5.9	7.1	8.2	2.3	0.4	5.5	7.5	2.7	11.8	3.9	3.5	1.1	2.8	2.8
Focus	5–11 May 2026	1,017	18.1	18.3	5.2	8.4	9.4	0.9	0.4	7.5	7.2	4.5	9.7	3.8	3.1	–	2.0	0.2
Ipsos	17–22 Apr 2026	1,046	17.4	19.2	6.0	6.8	9.4	1.3	–	7.1	8.3	3.2	11.1	4.0	2.8	–	1.4	1.8
AKO	8–17 Apr 2026	1,000	17.8	20.8	6.0	8.9	7.7	–	–	7.6	8.2	4.9	8.0	4.7	2.8	0.4	2.2	3.0
NMS	8–13 Apr 2026	1,001	17.3	20.2	5.8	7.0	7.1	2.2	0.6	5.3	7.3	2.8	13.6	4.2	3.8	0.8	1.8	2.9
Focus	20–27 Mar 2026	1,038	17.1	19.1	5.4	8.2	8.5	–	–	6.4	7.1	4.4	10.6	3.9	3.6	–	–	2.0
Ipsos	16–19 Mar 2026	1,008	20.0	20.6	6.0	8.2	7.9	–	–	6.3	7.2	2.4	11.3	4.3	2.2	–	–	0.6
AKO	10–18 Mar 2026	1,000	17.1	20.1	5.8	8.7	8.6	0.3	0.2	7.2	7.7	4.8	8.6	4.1	3.9	–	2.8	3.0
NMS	4–9 Mar 2026	1,005	16.7	21.4	5.1	7.6	7.1	1.6	0.9	4.8	7.6	2.3	13.5	4.2	3.6	1.1	2.9	4.7
Ipsos	16–20 Feb 2026	1,037	18.4	18.8	6.2	7.4	8.8	–	–	6.0	8.4	2.8	11.7	4.7	2.5	–	1.3	0.4
AKO	10–19 Feb 2026	1,000	16.4	20.6	6.2	8.8	9.3	–	–	7.4	7.9	4.8	8.7	4.6	2.9	–	2.4	4.2
NMS	4–8 Feb 2026	1,003	17.6	19.1	5.7	6.2	7.5	2.3	0.8	4.9	7.4	3.0	13.4	4.0	3.5	1.7	2.9	1.5
Focus	3–9 Feb 2026	1,014	17.7	19.3	5.6	8.1	9.7	–	–	6.9	7.6	4.1	9.9	4.7	2.3	–	1.9	1.6
Ipsos	15–20 Jan 2026	1,034	17.6	20.5	5.2	7.3	8.3	–	–	6.8	8.4	2.4	12.3	3.5	2.4	–	–	2.9
AKO	13–20 Jan 2026	1,000	16.9	23.2	6.3	9.2	8.0	–	–	7.0	7.5	4.7	7.2	4.3	2.3	0.2	3.2	6.3
NMS	8–11 Jan 2026	1,003	17.8	20.8	5.5	6.5	7.2	2.0	0.6	6.4	6.0	2.8	12.9	4.6	3.2	1.6	1.7	3.0
AKO	9–16 Dec 2025	1,000	17.0	23.6	5.4	9.6	8.9	–	–	6.6	7.4	4.7	7.0	3.9	2.2	0.2	3.5	6.6
Focus	1–9 Dec 2025	1,050	17.4	21.7	5.5	8.8	8.4	–	–	7.2	6.7	4.3	9.3	4.0	2.3	–	2.2	4.3
NMS	28 Nov–2 Dec 2025	1,006	18.3	22.6	5.9	6.5	7.6	1.5	0.6	5.3	6.3	2.2	11.9	3.7	3.9	1.1	1.9	4.3
Ipsos	24–28 Nov 2025	1,018	17.8	23.6	5.1	7.8	9.5	1.0	–	5.5	6.7	2.2	10.7	3.7	2.8	–	3.7	5.8
Focus	11–18 Nov 2025	1,015	16.5	22.1	5.2	9.1	8.9	–	–	6.3	6.5	4.2	10.0	4.6	2.1	–	2.0	5.6
AKO	11–18 Nov 2025	1,000	17.1	23.3	5.3	10.4	8.2	–	–	6.5	7.5	4.6	6.9	3.4	3.0	–	2.5	6.2
NMS	5–9 Nov 2025	1,002	16.3	23.1	5.3	7.5	8.3	1.6	0.6	5.4	6.3	2.4	12.1	4.0	3.6	1.6	1.9	6.8
Ipsos	15–20 Oct 2025	1,020	18.5	21.6	5.4	9.1	7.8	–	–	6.5	7.3	3.6	10.0	3.4	3.4	–	–	3.1
Focus	13–21 Oct 2025	1,028	17.0	23.1	5.2	9.4	8.3	–	–	6.7	6.3	4.3	9.8	4.0	3.8	–	–	6.1
AKO	7–18 Oct 2025	1,000	17.9	22.8	5.1	10.8	7.5	–	–	6.8	7.1	4.5	8.6	3.8	3.5	–	1.6	4.9
NMS	1–5 Oct 2025	1,002	17.9	24.8	5.2	8.3	6.4	1.4	1.4	5.4	5.9	2.0	11.8	4.4	3.2	1.2	0.3	6.9
AKO	8–22 Sep 2025	1,000	17.4	23.1	4.9	11.0	8.7	0.2	–	7.2	7.4	4.6	8.2	2.9	3.5	–	0.9	5.7
Ipsos	17–21 Sep 2025	1,053	18.4	22.8	4.4	8.3	7.3	–	–	6.8	7.7	3.5	10.9	3.5	3.6	–	–	4.4
Focus	10–17 Sep 2025	1,086	18.2	22.0	5.1	9.7	8.5	–	–	6.1	6.1	4.3	9.7	4.3	3.0	–	–	3.8
NMS	3–7 Sep 2025	1,002	20.1	22.1	5.5	9.5	7.1	1.7	0.4	5.7	6.1	2.0	10.2	4.1	3.2	0.8	0.2	2.0
Ipsos	15–19 Aug 2025	1,072	20.0	22.5	5.2	9.8	7.5	0.9	–	6.0	7.1	2.7	10.3	3.6	2.0	1.0	0.7	2.5
Focus	6–19 Aug 2025	3,100	18.7	21.2	4.8	10.1	8.2	–	–	6.7	6.3	4.4	9.9	4.6	–	–	–	2.5
AKO	5–11 Aug 2025	1,000	18.2	22.1	4.8	11.3	7.6	–	0.5	7.1	7.9	4.5	7.4	4.0	3.6	–	1.0	3.9
NMS	6–10 Aug 2025	1,000	17.4	23.9	4.5	9.2	8.2	1.8	0.6	6.0	6.2	2.7	10.4	3.7	3.4	1.3	0.2	6.5
AKO	8–15 Jul 2025	1,000	19.4	22.1	4.1	12.4	8.3	–	–	6.6	7.5	4.2	8.0	3.5	2.6	0.4	0.9	2.7
Focus	7–13 Jul 2025	1,032	19.6	20.7	4.6	11.7	7.5	–	–	6.3	6.8	3.8	9.8	4.0	2.5	–	–	1.1
NMS	2–7 Jul 2025	1,009	18.1	20.9	5.2	9.7	7.1	2.8	0.4	6.2	6.7	2.9	10.3	3.9	3.8	1.5	0.2	2.8
AKO	11–19 Jun 2025	1,000	19.3	22.5	4.8	12.1	8.0	–	–	6.9	7.3	4.1	8.1	3.4	2.7	–	0.8	3.2
Ipsos	16–19 Jun 2025	1,004	19.7	21.7	4.5	10.3	7.3	–	–	6.3	6.1	2.5	9.9	4.3	3.1	–	–	2.0
Focus	2–9 Jun 2025	1,034	18.8	20.2	4.8	10.5	8.5	–	–	7.5	6.1	3.7	9.7	4.8	3.4	–	–	1.4
NMS	4–8 Jun 2025	1,003	19.8	23.0	4.9	9.0	7.1	3.0	0.6	6.4	5.7	2.5	9.4	3.2	3.1	1.5	0.1	3.2
AKO	19–26 May 2025	1,000	19.0	21.5	4.5	12.1	8.8	–	–	7.8	7.2	4.2	7.3	3.5	3.0	–	1.1	2.5
Focus	12–19 May 2025	1,000	19.1	20.9	4.6	10.6	7.8	–	–	7.3	6.8	3.9	7.9	4.6	3.2	–	–	1.8
Ipsos	12–16 May 2025	1,013	19.6	21.9	4.7	8.4	7.3	1.3	–	7.5	6.6	3.0	9.3	4.8	3.6	1.1	0.9	2.3
NMS	30 Apr–4 May 2025	1,007	20.6	22.8	4.8	8.9	7.7	1.5	0.8	6.4	6.1	2.3	8.8	4.0	3.5	1.3	0.2	2.2
AKO	10–17 Apr 2025	1,000	20.5	22.5	4.2	12.0	8.7	0.1	0.2	7.3	7.1	4.1	7.0	4.0	1.5	–	0.8	2.0
Focus	1–8 Apr 2025	1,020	19.3	21.0	4.3	10.9	7.3	–	–	8.4	6.6	3.9	8.2	4.7	–	–	–	1.7
NMS	2–6 Apr 2025	1,005	19.9	23.4	4.8	8.5	6.8	2.3	0.6	6.9	6.5	1.9	9.2	3.8	3.7	1.2	0.2	3.5
AKO	11–19 Mar 2025	1,000	21.2	21.7	4.0	12.3	7.3	–	–	7.8	6.6	4.0	7.3	4.4	2.4	0.2	1.1	0.5
Ipsos	10–14 Mar 2025	1,032	22.1	21.4	5.0	12.5	5.9	–	–	7.8	6.3	2.0	7.4	3.9	2.5	–	–	0.7
NMS	5–9 Mar 2025	1,001	21.4	23.8	4.1	8.8	6.8	2.2	0.8	6.0	6.2	2.0	8.1	3.8	4.1	0.8	1.1	2.4
Focus	7–12 Feb 2025	1,010	21.7	22.1	4.6	11.8	5.6	0.6	0.4	7.8	6.2	3.7	7.8	4.6	2.6	–	0.4	0.4
AKO	5–12 Feb 2025	1,000	22.1	24.1	4.6	12.5	6.0	–	–	6.9	6.4	4.1	5.7	3.1	2.9	0.3	1.3	2.0
NMS	5–9 Feb 2025	1,001	22.5	24.6	3.0	10.5	5.8	2.1	0.9	6.6	6.1	1.5	7.4	3.2	4.1	0.8	0.1	2.1
AKO	14–24 Jan 2025	1,000	22.5	24.6	4.6	13.0	5.4	0.3	–	6.7	7.1	4.2	5.1	3.4	2.2	0.8	0.1	2.1
Ipsos	11–17 Jan 2025	1,031	22.2	23.0	4.0	11.1	5.6	1.9	–	7.3	6.3	2.0	7.7	3.7	2.8	1.1	1.2	0.8
NMS	9–13 Jan 2025	1,001	18.4	23.9	4.0	11.5	6.3	2.3	0.8	5.9	6.7	2.1	8.9	3.4	3.6	1.4	0.2	5.5
AKO	16–19 Dec 2024	1,000	20.3	22.8	4.3	13.9	6.2	0.2	–	7.3	6.6	4.6	5.4	3.2	3.8	0.3	1.1	2.5
NMS	4–9 Dec 2024	1,000	19.1	24.8	3.9	10.7	6.5	2.9	0.7	5.5	4.8	2.9	9.5	3.2	3.4	1.4	0.4	5.7
Focus	2–8 Dec 2024	1,022	20.8	21.5	4.0	13.8	5.2	–	–	6.9	6.1	3.7	8.1	5.6	2.2	–	–	0.7
AKO	12–20 Nov 2024	1,000	20.7	21.2	4.1	14.7	6.6	–	0.1	6.7	6.9	4.7	5.9	3.7	3.6	0.4	0.7	0.5
Focus	6–13 Nov 2024	1,018	21.9	22.6	4.6	13.3	3.6	–	–	6.2	6.7	3.6	8.6	4.8	3.3	–	0.8	0.7
NMS	7–11 Nov 2024	1,000	19.1	25.1	4.4	10.8	4.7	1.0	0.3	6.4	6.0	3.3	8.7	3.7	4.3	1.0	0.5	6.0
Ipsos	27 Oct–1 Nov 2024	1,003	21.9	22.6	4.4	12.8	3.6	1.6	0.8	6.9	6.2	2.4	7.7	4.0	3.0	1.2	0.6	0.7
AKO	8–17 Oct 2024	1,000	21.3	21.3	4.7	15.0	5.9			6.2	6.5	4.8	6.8	3.4	2.6	0.6	0.9	Tie
NMS	2–7 Oct 2024	1,000	20.5	24.4	5.1	12.0	5.2		0.2	6.9	6.2	2.9	7.4	3.6	3.9	1.3	0.7	3.9
Focus	17–26 Sep 2024	1,017	23.3	22.1	5.0	12.8	4.1			6.0	5.6	4.7	7.9	5.2	3.2	–	0.1	1.2
AKO	10–16 Sep 2024	1,000	22.8	22.4	4.9	15.1	3.9			6.8	6.4	4.9	5.4	3.7	2.6	–	0.9	0.4
Ipsos	6–10 Sep 2024	1,025	25.5	21.6	5.1	11.9	4.9			6.0	7.0	3.4	6.3	4.9	2.0	–	–	3.9
NMS	5–9 Sep 2024	1,001	23.9	24.5	3.3	12.6	3.9		0.6	6.2	6.1	3.5	6.0	3.4	3.9	1.2	–	0.6
NMS	8–12 Aug 2024	1,014	22.4	23.1	4.5	14.3	4.4		0.8	6.2	5.8	3.2	7.0	3.2	3.2	1.1	–	0.7
AKO	6–12 Aug 2024	1,000	23.6	22.0	4.5	15.9	3.6			6.9	6.2	4.9	5.2	3.4	2.7	0.2	0.9	1.6
Focus	9–14 Jul 2024	1,013	25.7	21.3	4.7	11.3	4.4			7.3	7.2	3.4	6.5	4.5	2.7	–	1.0	4.4
AKO	9–15 Jul 2024	1,000	23.5	21.7	4.4	15.5	3.5			7.4	5.6	5.0	5.6	4.3	2.3	0.5	0.7	1.8
NMS	4–8 Jul 2024	1,020	22.5	22.6	4.6	13.1	4.2		1.2	6.0	5.1	4.1	7.0	3.4	3.7	1.5	1.2	0.1
Ipsos	26 Jun–1 Jul 2024	1,017	25.2	22.3	4.7	13.5	4.1			6.3	6.1	3.1	6.8	4.3	1.8	0.9	0.8	2.9
AKO	11–18 Jun 2024	1,000	23.8	22.8	4.1	15.2	4.7			6.8	5.3	5.1	6.0	3.4	2.1	–	0.8	1.0
Focus	5–12 Jun 2024	1,025	24.2	21.6	3.6	14.5	4.1			6.6	6.1	4.7	7.3	5.2	1.8	–	–	2.6
European election	8 Jun 2024	1,476,968	24.77	27.82	4.69	7.18	1.99		0.63	7.15	4.92	1.90	12.53	3.80	–	0.48	2.06	3.05
NMS	30 May–3 Jun 2024	1,020	22.4	23.7	2.9	15.8	3.4		0.9	5.6	5.6	4.5	7.4	3.5	3.0	0.8	–	1.3
Ipsos	14–21 May 2024	743	25.0	21.0	3.4	14.0	4.9			7.1	8.0	3.5	5.1	4.1	2.9	–	–	4.0
AKO	7–14 May 2024	1,000	21.8	20.8	3.6	17.2	4.7			7.3	6.7	5.2	5.1	3.9	3.1	–	0.6	1.0
NMS	9–13 May 2024	1,020	20.9	23.1	3.4	14.9	5.5		0.7	5.4	6.6	3.7	7.9	3.5	3.2	0.6	–	2.2
Focus	17–24 Apr 2024	1,017	21.1	19.7	3.5	18.0	5.2			6.9	7.0	5.3	5.5	4.5	2.3	0.9	0.1	1.4
AKO	9–16 Apr 2024	1,000	21.2	20.1	3.3	16.5	5.2			7.9	6.5	5.1	4.9	4.9	2.3	0.8	1.3	1.1
Focus	28 Mar–4 Apr 2024	1,015	21.6	20.1	3.7	17.9	6.4			6.3	5.4	5.1	4.6	5.0	1.8	1.9	–	1.5
Ipsos	16–19 Mar 2024	1,009	21.6	20.2	3.8	16.3	5.8			6.2	6.7	4.1	5.0	4.6	3.0	–	–	1.4
AKO	11–18 Mar 2024	1,000	22.1	21.0	3.2	15.9	5.6			8.1	6.7	5.1	3.9	4.6	2.0	1.3	0.5	1.1
Ipsos	12–16 Mar 2024	1,038	23.4	20.8	2.6	17.1	5.6			6.2	6.3	5.3	4.2	3.6	3.1	–	–	2.6
Ipsos	16–21 Feb 2024	1,028	22.7	21.3	2.4	16.5	5.8			6.7	6.4	4.2	5.2	3.4	3.2	1.6	0.5	1.4
Focus	14–21 Feb 2024	1,025	21.1	18.9	3.5	17.2	5.9			6.1	6.2	5.8	4.2	5.4	2.6	2.7	0.4	2.2
NMS	14–18 Feb 2024	1,022	21.0	22.0	2.5	16.9	6.0			7.2	5.7	4.2	5.8	3.3	3.6	1.6	0.2	1.0
AKO	5–12 Feb 2024	1,000	24.0	22.6	1.5	14.5	6.0			8.2	6.2	5.3	3.7	4.6	2.8	0.2	0.4	1.4
Ipsos	22–25 Jan 2024	1,022	24.5	20.6	3.0	15.4	5.3			6.6	6.6	4.3	5.1	4.0	2.4	1.6	0.5	3.9
Focus	16–23 Jan 2024	1,015	21.6	19.4	3.5	17.9	6.5			6.2	5.5	5.7	4.8	4.6	2.4	1.7	0.2	2.2
AKO	11–16 Jan 2024	1,048	22.1	19.9	3.2	14.3	7.0			8.7	6.0	5.4	5.3	4.3	2.4	1.0	0.4	2.2
NMS	10–14 Jan 2024	1,030	22.3	21.1	3.1	14.7	6.0			6.9	6.9	4.5	6.5	3.4	3.3	0.5	0.7	1.2
Ipsos	13–18 Dec 2023	1,048	24.1	19.4	3.6	15.7	5.9			6.4	7.1	4.8	5.2	4.0	2.7	0.8	0.5	4.7
AKO	11–13 Dec 2023	1,000	24.2	21.4	2.0	14.6	6.8			7.3	6.4	5.3	5.4	3.6	2.3	0.2	–	2.8
Focus	15–22 Nov 2023	1,015	23.8	17.9	2.9	14.6	6.4			7.5	6.4	5.8	5.3	5.0	2.8	1.2	0.4	5.9
AKO	7–14 Nov 2023	1,000	24.0	20.1	2.3	15.4	6.6			6.9	5.9	5.4	4.9	4.4	2.7	0.3	0.1	3.9
Ipsos	2–7 Nov 2023	1,021	24.0	19.1	3.1	15.1	7.0			5.8	6.3	5.1	5.8	4.4	2.3	1.1	1.0	4.9
2023 election	30 Sep 2023	2,967,896	22.95	17.96	2.93	14.70	8.90			6.82	6.32	5.63	4.75	4.39	2.21	0.84	1.60	4.99

==== Scenario Polls ====
In addition to the regular opinion polls, several polls based on potential political scenarios have been published. These polls are listed below. For better comparison, the corresponding baseline polls from the above table – if such exist – are shown in the rows with light yellow background.

Joint List Scenarios

Polling firm	Date	Sample size	Smer	Hlas	SNS	Republika	PS	Democrats	KDH	SaS	OĽaNO and Friends			Hungarian Alliance	We Are Family	ĽSNS	Others	Lead
Polling firm	Date	Sample size	Smer	Hlas	SNS	Republika	PS	Democrats	KDH	SaS	Slovakia	ZĽ	KÚ	Hungarian Alliance	We Are Family	ĽSNS	Others	Lead
Focus	5–11 May 2026	1,017	22.6	8.7	4.0	11.8	37.2					3.0	–	4.1	4.3	–	–	14.6
Focus	5–11 May 2026	1,017	20.7	8.7	3.7	10.4	23.1		7.6	7.0	9.1	–	–	3.3	2.3	–	–	2.4
Focus	5–11 May 2026	1,017	18.1	8.4	4.5	9.7	18.3	5.2	7.5	7.2	9.4	0.9	0.4	3.8	3.1	–	2.0	0.2
Focus	3–9 Feb 2026	1,014	31.9				20.9	5.4	8.8	7.9	12.2	–	–	4.9	2.8	–	2.2	11.0
Focus	3–9 Feb 2026	1,014	25.6			10.5	19.4	5.3	7.9	8.5	11.2	–	–	4.6	2.5	–	–	6.2
Focus	3–9 Feb 2026	1,014	17.7	8.1	4.1	9.9	19.3	5.6	6.9	7.6	9.7	–	–	4.7	2.3	–	1.9	1.6

Scenarios involving Ivan Korčok
The Focus polling agency conducted a poll containing two scenarios asking about a potential involvement of former Minister of Foreign and European Affairs and 2024 presidential candidate Ivan Korčok in party politics. The poll was commissioned by Korčok himself. One of those scenarios did materialize in 2024 when Korčok decided to join the liberal Progressive Slovakia party.

Polling firm	Date	Sample size	Scenario	Smer	PS	Hlas	OĽaNO and Friends			KDH	SaS	Democrats	Korčok Party	SNS	Republika	Hungarian Alliance	We Are Family	ĽSNS	Others	Lead
Polling firm	Date	Sample size	Scenario	Smer	PS	Hlas	Slovakia	ZĽ	KÚ	KDH	SaS	Democrats	Korčok Party	SNS	Republika	Hungarian Alliance	We Are Family	ĽSNS	Others	Lead
Focus	9–14 Jul 2024	1,013	(Note: Korčok runs with his own party.)	25.2	15.6	10.7	2.9			6.7	4.5	3.0	14.4	3.3	6.9	4.0	2.1	–	–	9.6
Focus	9–14 Jul 2024	1,013	(Note: Korčok joins Progressive Slovakia.)	24.7	27.6	11.0	3.5			6.5	5.0	5.1	–	2.1	6.9	4.4	2.3	–	–	3.2
Focus	9–14 Jul 2024	1,013	(Note: Korčok joins SaS.)	25.0	16.0	12.0	3.5			6.8	14.1	4.1	–	3.5	6.6	4.4	3.0	–	–	9.0
Focus	9–14 Jul 2024	1,013	(Note: Korčok joins Demokrati.)	26.1	17.9	10.4	3.2			6.9	4.2	13.1	–	3.5	6.8	4.4	2.7	–	–	8.2
Focus	9–14 Jul 2024	1,013	(Note: Korčok joins an alliance of SaS and Demokrati.)	26.1	17.7	12.0	4.2			7.4	14.5		–	2.7	7.5	4.3	2.5	–	–	8.4
Focus	9–14 Jul 2024	1,013	–	25.7	21.3	11.3	4.4			7.3	7.2	4.7	–	3.4	6.5	4.5	2.7	–	1.0	4.4

== Seat projections ==
76 seats are required for an absolute majority in the National Council.

Polling firm	Date	Sample size	Smer	PS and Democrats		Hlas	OĽaNO and Friends	KDH	SaS	SNS	Republika	Hungarian Alliance	Lead	Gov.	Opp.
Polling firm	Date	Sample size	Smer	PS	Democrats	Hlas	OĽaNO and Friends	KDH	SaS	SNS	Republika	Hungarian Alliance	Lead	Gov.	Opp.
Ipsos	16–20 Nov 2026	1,030	30	42		12	19	12	14	0	21	0	12	42	108
15 Nov 2026	PS and Democrats announce an electoral coalition for the 2027 parliamentary election.														
NMS	5–8 Nov 2026	1,004	34	36	0	14	18	9	15	0	24	0	2	48	102
AKO	21–28 Oct 2026	1,000	29	34	9	15	17	13	15	0	18	0	5	44	106
Ipsos	15–19 Oct 2026	1,032	32	33	9	12	18	13	14	0	19	0	1	44	106
Focus	12–19 Oct 2026	1,017	31	32	10	15	18	12	11	0	21	0	1	46	104
NMS	1–5 Oct 2026	1,005	33	36	0	11	17	11	15	0	27	0	3	44	106
Ipsos	18–22 Sep 2026	1,030	29	33	9	11	19	12	15	0	22	0	4	40	110
AKO	10–21 Sep 2026	2,000	33	37	9	16	16	13	16	0	19	0	4	49	101
NMS	2–7 Sep 2026	1,004	30	40	0	12	16	11	12	0	29	0	10	42	108
Focus	1–7 Sep 2026	1,012	31	31	9	15	16	12	14	0	22	0	0	46	104
Ipsos	18–23 Aug 2026	1,061	34	34	0	16	16	14	15	0	21	0	0	50	100
AKO	6–14 Aug 2026	1,000	33	39	0	16	14	14	16	0	18	0	6	49	101
NMS	5–10 Aug 2026	1,001	32	38	0	11	17	12	14	0	26	0	6	43	107
AKO	8–14 Jul 2026	1,000	31	35	10	15	17	13	15	0	17	0	4	46	104
NMS	1–7 Jul 2026	1,002	28	34	9	14	17	10	15	0	23	0	6	42	108
Focus	22–29 Jun 2026	1,027	34	35	0	15	17	13	14	0	22	0	1	49	101
Ipsos	17–23 Jun 2026	1,035	34	36	9	12	13	12	16	0	18	0	3	46	104
AKO	10–18 Jun 2026	1,000	32	35	11	15	12	14	15	0	16	0	3	47	103
NMS	3–8 Jun 2026	1,002	32	38	11	14	16	0	14	0	25	0	6	46	104
AKO	14–21 May 2026	1,000	33	34	8	16	14	14	15	0	16	0	1	49	101
Ipsos	15–20 May 2026	1,009	36	37	0	15	15	11	15	0	21	0	1	51	99
NMS	6–10 May 2026	1,002	31	36	11	13	15	10	13	0	21	0	5	43	107
Focus	5–11 May 2026	1,017	33	33	9	15	17	13	13	0	17	0	0	48	102
Ipsos	17–22 Apr 2026	1,046	31	34	10	12	16	12	15	0	20	0	3	43	107
AKO	8–17 Apr 2026	1,000	32	37	11	16	13	13	14	0	14	0	5	48	102
NMS	8–13 Apr 2026	1,001	31	36	10	13	13	9	13	0	25	0	5	44	106
Focus	20–27 Mar 2026	1,038	31	35	10	15	15	12	13	0	19	0	4	46	104
Ipsos	16–19 Mar 2026	1,008	34	36	10	14	14	11	12	0	19	0	2	48	102
AKO	10–18 Mar 2026	1,000	31	36	10	16	15	13	14	0	15	0	5	47	103
NMS	4–9 Mar 2026	1,005	32	41	10	14	13	0	14	0	26	0	9	46	104
Ipsos	16–20 Feb 2026	1,037	32	33	11	13	15	10	15	0	21	0	1	45	105
AKO	10–19 Feb 2026	1,000	29	36	11	16	16	13	14	0	15	0	7	45	105
NMS	4–8 Feb 2026	1,003	34	37	11	12	15	0	15	0	23	0	3	46	104
Focus	3–9 Feb 2026	1,014	32	34	10	14	17	12	13	0	18	0	2	46	104
Ipsos	15–20 Jan 2026	1,034	31	36	9	13	14	12	14	0	21	0	5	44	106
AKO	13–20 Jan 2026	1,000	30	41	11	16	14	12	13	0	13	0	11	46	104
NMS	8–11 Jan 2026	1,003	32	38	10	12	13	11	11	0	23	0	6	44	106
AKO	9–16 Dec 2025	1,000	31	40	9	17	16	12	13	0	12	0	9	48	102
Focus	1–9 Dec 2025	1,050	31	38	10	15	15	13	12	0	16	0	7	46	104
NMS	28 Nov–2 Dec 2025	1,006	33	40	11	12	13	9	11	0	21	0	7	45	105
Ipsos	24–28 Nov 2025	1,018	31	41	9	13	16	9	12	0	19	0	10	44	106
Focus	11–18 Nov 2025	1,015	29	39	9	16	16	11	12	0	18	0	10	45	105
AKO	11–18 Nov 2025	1,000	30	41	9	18	15	12	13	0	12	0	11	48	102
NMS	5–9 Nov 2025	1,002	29	41	9	13	15	10	11	0	22	0	12	42	108
Ipsos	15–20 Oct 2025	1,020	32	38	9	16	14	11	13	0	17	0	6	48	102
Focus	13–21 Oct 2025	1,028	30	40	9	16	15	12	11	0	17	0	10	46	104
AKO	7–18 Oct 2025	1,000	31	40	9	18	13	12	12	0	15	0	9	49	101
NMS	1–5 Oct 2025	1,002	31	44	9	15	11	9	10	0	21	0	13	46	104
AKO	8–22 Sep 2025	1,000	31	42	0	20	16	13	13	0	15	0	11	51	99
Ipsos	17–21 Sep 2025	1,053	34	42	0	15	13	12	14	0	20	0	8	49	101
Focus	10–17 Sep 2025	1,086	32	39	9	17	15	11	10	0	17	0	7	49	101
NMS	3–7 Sep 2025	1,002	35	39	10	16	12	10	10	0	18	0	4	51	99
Ipsos	15–19 Aug 2025	1,072	34	38	9	17	13	10	12	0	17	0	4	51	99
Focus	6–19 Aug 2025	3,100	35	39	0	19	15	12	12	0	18	0	4	54	96
AKO	5–11 Aug 2025	1,000	34	41	0	21	14	13	14	0	13	0	7	55	95
NMS	6–10 Aug 2025	1,000	32	44	0	17	15	11	12	0	19	0	12	49	101
AKO	8–15 Jul 2025	1,000	35	39	0	22	15	12	13	0	14	0	4	57	93
Focus	7–13 Jul 2025	1,032	36	38	0	21	14	11	12	0	18	0	2	57	93
NMS	2–7 Jul 2025	1,009	33	37	9	17	13	11	12	0	18	0	4	50	100
AKO	11–19 Jun 2025	1,000	34	40	0	22	14	12	13	0	15	0	6	56	94
Ipsos	16–19 Jun 2025	1,004	37	40	0	19	13	12	11	0	18	0	3	56	94
Focus	2–9 Jun 2025	1,034	35	37	0	19	16	14	11	0	18	0	2	54	96
NMS	4–8 Jun 2025	1,003	37	43	0	17	13	12	11	0	17	0	6	54	96
AKO	19–26 May 2025	1,000	34	39	0	21	16	14	13	0	13	0	5	55	95
Focus	12–19 May 2025	1,000	36	39	0	20	14	13	13	0	15	0	3	56	94
Ipsos	12–16 May 2025	1,013	37	41	0	16	13	14	12	0	17	0	4	53	97
NMS	30 Apr–4 May 2025	1,007	38	42	0	17	14	12	11	0	16	0	4	55	95
AKO	10–17 Apr 2025	1,000	36	40	0	21	15	13	13	0	12	0	4	57	93
Focus	1–8 Apr 2025	1,020	36	39	0	20	13	15	12	0	15	0	3	56	94
NMS	2–6 Apr 2025	1,005	37	43	0	16	12	13	12	0	17	0	6	53	97
AKO	11–19 Mar 2025	1,000	38	39	0	22	13	14	12	0	12	0	1	60	90
Ipsos	10–14 Mar 2025	1,032	38	36	8	21	10	13	11	0	13	0	2	59	91
NMS	5–9 Mar 2025	1,001	40	44	0	16	13	11	11	0	15	0	4	56	94
Focus	7–12 Feb 2025	1,010	40	40	0	21	10	14	11	0	14	0	0	61	89
AKO	5–12 Feb 2025	1,000	40	43	0	22	11	12	12	0	10	0	3	62	88
NMS	5–9 Feb 2025	1,001	41	44	0	19	10	12	11	0	13	0	3	60	90
AKO	14–24 Jan 2025	1,000	40	44	0	23	9	12	13	0	9	0	4	63	87
Ipsos	11–17 Jan 2025	1,031	40	42	0	20	10	13	11	0	14	0	2	60	90
NMS	9–13 Jan 2025	1,001	34	44	0	21	12	12	11	0	16	0	10	55	95
AKO	16–19 Dec 2024	1,000	37	42	0	25	11	13	12	0	10	0	5	62	88
NMS	4–9 Dec 2024	1,000	37	49	0	21	13	11	0	0	19	0	12	58	92
Focus	2–8 Dec 2024	1,022	36	37	0	23	9	12	10	0	14	9	1	59	91
AKO	12–20 Nov 2024	1,000	37	39	0	27	12	12	12	0	11	0	2	64	86
Focus	6–13 Nov 2024	1,018	41	43	0	25	0	12	13	0	16	0	2	66	84
NMS	7–11 Nov 2024	1,000	38	50	0	21	0	12	12	0	17	0	12	59	91
Ipsos	27 Oct–1 Nov 2024	1,003	42	43	0	25	0	13	12	0	15	0	1	67	83
AKO	8–17 Oct 2024	1,000	41	41	0	29	0	12	13	0	14	0	0	70	80
NMS	2–7 Oct 2024	1,000	35	42	9	20	9	12	10	0	13	0	7	55	95
Focus	17–26 Sep 2024	1,017	40	38	8	22	0	10	10	0	13	9	2	62	88
AKO	10–16 Sep 2024	1,000	43	43	0	29	0	13	12	0	10	0	0	72	78
Ipsos	6–10 Sep 2024	1,025	46	39	9	21	0	11	13	0	11	0	7	67	83
NMS	5–9 Sep 2024	1,001	45	46	0	24	0	12	12	0	11	0	1	69	81
AKO	6–12 Aug 2024	1,000	44	41	0	30	0	13	12	0	10	0	3	74	76
AKO	9–15 Jul 2024	1,000	42	39	0	27	0	13	10	9	10	0	3	78	72
Ipsos	26 Jun–1 Jul 2024	1,017	47	42	0	25	0	12	11	0	13	0	5	72	78
AKO	11–18 Jun 2024	1,000	42	40	0	27	0	12	9	9	11	0	2	78	72
Focus	5–12 Jun 2024	1,025	43	38	0	25	0	11	11	0	13	9	5	68	82
AKO	7–14 May 2024	1,000	39	37	0	31	0	13	12	9	9	0	2	79	71
Focus	17–24 Apr 2024	1,017	38	36	0	33	0	12	12	9	10	0	2	80	70
AKO	9–16 Apr 2024	1,000	41	39	0	32	0	15	13	10	0	0	2	83	67
Focus	28 Mar–4 Apr 2024	1,015	40	37	0	33	0	12	10	9	0	9	3	82	68
AKO	11–18 Mar 2024	1,000	42	40	0	30	0	15	13	10	0	0	2	82	68
Ipsos	12–16 Mar 2024	1,038	42	37	0	30	10	11	11	0	9	0	5	72	78
Ipsos	16–21 Feb 2024	1,028	41	38	0	29	10	12	11	0	9	0	3	70	80
Focus	14–21 Feb 2024	1,025	39	35	0	32	0	11	12	11	0	10	4	82	68
AKO	5–12 Feb 2024	1,000	45	42	0	27	0	15	11	10	0	0	5	82	68
Focus	16–23 Jan 2024	1,015	43	38	0	35	0	12	11	11	0	0	5	89	61
AKO	11–16 Jan 2024	1,048	37	34	0	24	12	15	10	9	9	0	5	70	80
Ipsos	13–18 Dec 2023	1,048	47	37	0	30	0	12	14	0	10	0	10	77	73
AKO	11–13 Dec 2023	1,000	43	38	0	26	0	13	11	9	10	0	5	78	72
Focus	15–22 Nov 2023	1,015	42	31	0	25	0	13	11	10	9	9	11	77	73
AKO	7–14 Nov 2023	1,000	47	39	0	30	0	13	11	10	0	0	8	87	63
2023 election	30 Sep 2023	2,967,896	42	32	0	27	16	12	11	10	0	0	10	79	71
