= Southeast Europe protests (2024–present) =

Southeast Europe protests (2024–present) may refer to:

- 2024–2026 Georgian protests
- 2025–2026 Turkish protests
- 2025 Southeast Europe retail boycotts
- 2024–2026 Serbian anti-corruption protests
- 2024–2026 Slovak protests
