= Agenda Europe =

European conservative extremist organization

Agenda Europe is a large European umbrella organization that seeks to promote conservative extremist positions.

Agenda Europa was created in 2013 based on strict criteria of secrecy. Its specifics were only revealed in 2017 when multiple documents emerged regarding the project's operations, participants, goals, and funding.

== History ==
=== Beginning ===
Agenda Europe was created in January 2013 out of a meeting that took place in London involving, approximately, 20 North American and European anti-abortion leaders and strategic advisors.

Organized jointly by the Austrian conservative and Catholic activist Gudrun Kugler and the American Terrence McKeegan the London retreat was to be kept strictly confidential.

=== Development ===
"Agenda Europe" debuted in 2013 as an anonymously-authored blog harshly criticizing legal and political developments in the area of human rights regarding, inter alia, the right to life, marriage and family, equality, and the freedom of conscience or religion, sexuality and reproduction. The blog quickly became a focal point for traditionalist perspectives in this arena.

Documents regarding the organization became publicly available when anonymous computer hackers hacked the computers of the Spanish NGO HazteOir and published the stolen documents on Wikileaks. These documents were then used for a documentary by Franco-German ArteTV, broadly featuring pro-abortion activist Neil Datta and allowing him to present his (critical) views. These documents included details of the aforementioned founding meeting that took place in 2013, the name chosen for the organizational center, the subsequent yearly meetings of the board, a list of social networking experts with whom the group intended to act on the internet, and "Restoring the Natural Order: an Agenda for Europe," which introduced the group's platform. Datta was also the author of a series of brochures subsequently published and distributed by the European Parliamentary Forum on Population and Development with the purpose of informing the public about "Agenda Europe", which was painted as a dangerous conspirative network with links to the Kremlin as well as the European High aristocracy and the broad purpose of "rolling back women's rights".

=== Participants ===
The hacked documents mentioned above appeared to reveal that, up to that point, Agenda Europe's board numbered about 100–150 individuals and at least 50 conservative organizations.

The organization can also count on the support of some senior Catholic prelates; an example can be seen at the 2014 annual conference when properties used for spiritual retreats were given to participants by the Archdiocese of Munich.

=== Financing ===
According to EPF, the group can count on numerous funds from organizations belonging to: billionaires, aristocrats and oligarchs. Among the names quoted are:

- Patrick Slim Domit, son of multi-billionaire Carlos Slim Helú is one of the biggest funders of anti-abortion movements in Mexico and around the world.
- Representatives of the Habsburg-Lorraine family (Austria's last imperial family), who have lent their patronage to many of the group's initiatives (the family's wealth is between $63 million and $207 million).
- Oliver Hylton, who was the wealth manager of financier Sir Michel Hintze (a tycoon with assets of $2.6 billion known in the news for his funding of propaganda groups related to global warming denialism).
- Alexey Komov, representative of the Russian Orthodox Church, is sponsored by the far-right multimillionaire oligarch Konstantin Malofeev, was in charge of the foundation's international projects.

=== Strategy ===
Like any other lobby group, the group acts through: political lobbying, referendum campaigns, petitions and information actions.

To more effectively convey their demands against secularization and cultural revolutions far from their positions, the organization aims to: impute to those who support instances diametrically opposed to theirs that they are discriminating and intolerant towards Christians or that they are Christianophobic by portraying themselves as victims, bring their proposals under the name of "rights" and not "restrictions" or "prohibitions", label their opponents as violent and themselves as "anti-system" trying to become respectable interlocutors at the international level.

=== Operation ===
The group has drafted many campaigns to influence legislation in different countries and some of the most important include:

- The petition and referendum to ban same-sex marriage in the Croatian constitution (2013; successful)
- A bill to limit the right to abortion in Spain (2014; failure: revoked in September 2014)
- The petition and referendum to restrict same-sex marriage in Slovenia (2015; successful)
- The complaint against Sweden for failure to respect conscientious objection in the area of reproductive health (2015–2017; failure: all requests rejected)
- The referendum to restrict same-sex marriage in Slovakia (2015; failure: quorum not reached)
- A Polish bill to ban abortion with prison sentences for women (2016; failure: rejected by Parliament in October 2016)
- A "Mom, Dad & Kids" initiative to define marriage in Europe as only between a man and a woman (2016; failure: insufficient signatures collected)
- Political lobbying against the ratification of the Istanbul Convention for Bulgaria, Croatia, Poland (2016–2018; success in Bulgaria and failure in Croatia and Poland)
- Petition and referendum to ban egalitarian marriage in Romania (2016–2018; success: 3 million signatures collected; failure: quorum not reached)

=== Yearly meetings ===
The program of the meetings follows a set formula: a reception at which an opening speech is made usually by a politician, then an Italian member of parliament or Aleksander Stępkowski of Poland. This is followed by a Mass celebration and a two-day seminar with presentations related to the group's instances and progress.
