= Milan Majerský =

Slovak politician

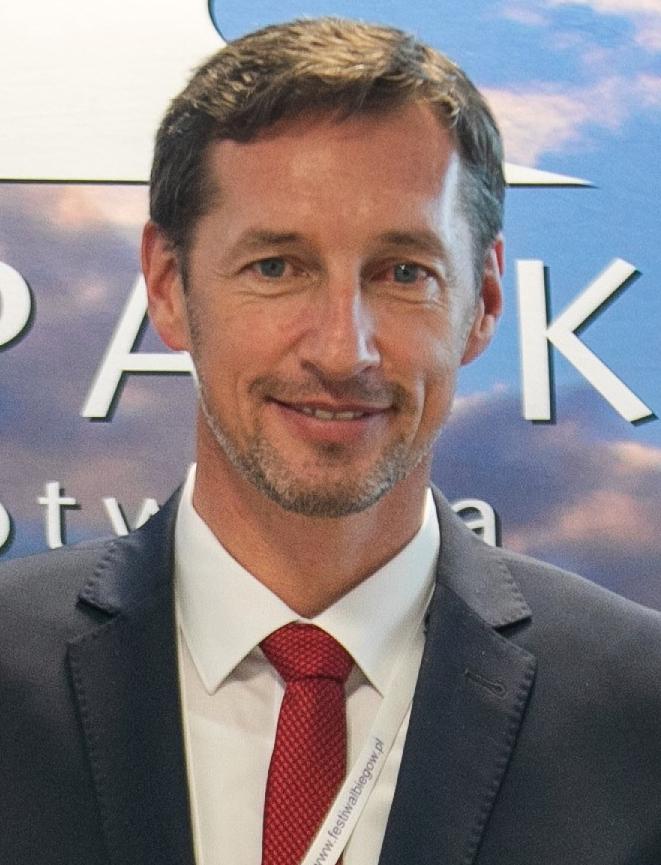
- Milan Majerský in 2020

Member of the National Council
- Incumbent
- Assumed office 25 October 2023

Governor of Prešov Region
- Incumbent
- Assumed office 1 December 2017
- Preceded by: Peter Chudík

Mayor of Levoča
- In office 15 November 2014 – 1 December 2017
- Preceded by: Miroslav Vilkovský
- Succeeded by: Lídia Budziňáková

Chairman of Christian Democratic Movement
- Incumbent
- Assumed office 22 August 2020
- Preceded by: Alojz Hlina

Personal details
- Born: 12 May 1971 (age 55) Levoča, Czechoslovakia
- Party: KDH (1990–present)
- Spouse(s): Marcela Majerská (div. 2020) Miriam Lexmann (m. 2020)
- Children: 2
- Education: University of Prešov; Catholic University in Ružomberok

Milan Majerský (born 12 May 1971) is a Slovak politician. He has served as the Governor of the Prešov Region since 2017, the chairman of the Christian Democratic Movement since 2020 and a Member of the National Council of Slovakia since 2023. He previously served as mayor of Levoča from 2014 to 2017.

== Early life ==
Majerský was born on 12 May 1971 in Levoča. He graduated from the Catholic Faculty of the University of Prešov in 1997. Majerský later worked as a teacher at St. František Assiský in Levoča from 1997 to 2014, having taught Physical Education and religious education.

== Political career ==
=== Mayor of Levoča ===
In 2014, Majerský ran for mayor of Levoča in the municipal elections. He was among four elected candidates with a vote ratio of 50.5%, himself receiving 2,370 votes. Majerský ran with the support of the right-wing coalition KDH, KDS, MOST-HÍD, NOVA, OKS, #SIEŤ, and SDKÚ-DS.

=== 2017–present: Chairman of the self-governing region of Prešov ===
In May 2017, Majerský announced his candidacy for chairman of the Prešov self-governing region for the coalition of parties KDH, OĽANO, SaS, and NOVA.

Majerský was elected chairman of the Prešov Region on 4 November 2017. With the highest voter turnout in the region (29.95%), he won in nine districts and received 40.4% of the votes compared to Chudík (Direction – Social Democracy) with 30.6% and four winning districts.

In 2022, Majerský ran for the post of chairman of the Prešov region again, beating Michal Kaliňák with 111,343 votes (42.01%).

==== Chairman of Christian Democratic Movement ====
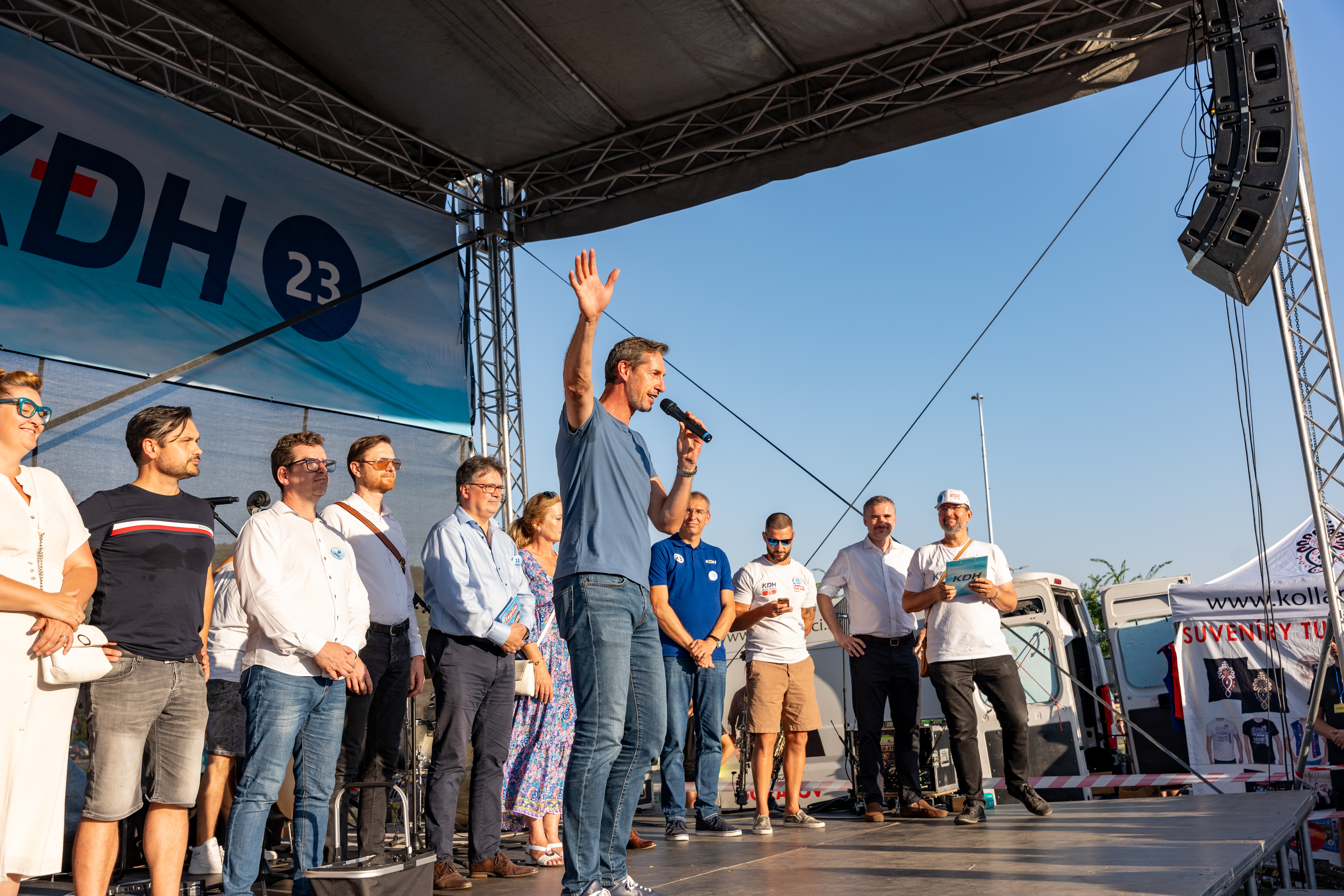
Majerský and other KDH representatives at the Family Show in Nitra in September 2023.

On 6 May 2020, Majerský announced his candidacy for chairman of Christian Democratic Movement. He was eventually elected as the only candidate who received 278 of the 326 votes of the delegates.

Majerský was re-elected chairman at the movement's congress on 18 June 2022. He had no challenger and won the overwhelming majority of votes cast by 298 delegates. In September 2023, Majerský became the electoral leader of the KDH after the 2023 Slovak parliamentary election.

== Personal life ==
Apart from his native Slovak, Majerský can speak English and Italian.

Majerský has two children from his previous marriage with Marcela Majerská. After their divorce, he became engaged to MEP compatriot Miriam Lexmann. On 16 August 2020, Majerský and Lexmann got married in the church of Our Lady of the Snows in Bratislava.

== Controversy ==
In an interview with Denník N, Majerský perceives Prosecutor General Maroš Žilinka visiting Russia to celebrate the anniversary of the establishment of the Russian Prosecutor Office as a problem: "Žilinka is a decent person who sometimesoverreacts. What disturbs me the most is his statement about going to Moscow to meet with the Russian prosecutor." According to Majerský, such a trip is not appropriate.

On 3 September 2023, Majerský was accused of referring to LGBT as a "plague". After politicians from other parties challenged him, Majerský apologised and clarified that the designation was not aimed at a group of people, but an ideology.
