= 2022 in Slovakia =

- Decades: 2000s; 2010s; 2020s
- See also: Other events of 2022; History of Slovakia • Years

Events in the year 2022 in Slovakia.

== Incumbents ==
- President: Zuzana Čaputová
- Prime Minister: Eduard Heger

== Events ==
- Ongoing – COVID-19 pandemic in Slovakia
- 8 February – Thousands of Slovaks protested in Bratislava against a potential military defense treaty between Slovakia and the United States. Police prevented protesters from entering the National Council building, where the bill was being debated by lawmakers.
- 19 February – The Slovakia men's hockey team wins their first medal at the Winter Olympics after defeating Sweden in the Bronze medal game.
- 14 March – Slovakia expels three Russian diplomats for alleged espionage and bribery.
- 16 June – Four people are killed and five others are injured in a building fire in the town of Handlová.
- 30 June – Slovakia measures the highest ever temperature in June in Somotor near Košice, reaching 38.8 °C (101.8 °F).
- 7 July – Slovakia reports its first case of monkeypox.
- 9 August – Russia's Transneft says that Ukraine has suspended Russian oil flows through the Druzhba pipeline to the Czech Republic, Hungary and Slovakia after it was unable to pay transit fees to Ukraine's pipeline operator UkrTransNafta.
- 12 October – 2022 Bratislava shooting: Two people were killed and another person was wounded in a shooting in Bratislava. The shooting took place in front of the Tepláreň café, which is a well-known spot frequented by the Bratislava LGBT community.

== Art and entertainment ==
- List of Slovak submissions for the Academy Award for Best International Feature Film

== Deaths ==
- 4 January: Carl Linhart, 92, Slovak-born American baseball player (Detroit Tigers).
- 9 January: Rudolf Čillík, 90, Olympic cross-country skier.
- 19 January: Alica Bieliková, 79, politician, member of the National Council (1994–1998).
- 22 January: Emerich Roth, 97, Slovak-born Swedish Holocaust survivor and writer.
- 2 February: László Szigeti, 64, politician, minister of education (2006).
- 7 February: Ivan Hudec, 74, politician, minister of culture (1994–1998).
- 10 February: Eduard Kukan, 82, politician, member of the National Council (1994–1998, 2006–2009), minister of foreign affairs (1994, 1998–2006) and MEP (2009–2019).
- 12 February: Ivan Reitman, 75, Czechoslovak-born Canadian film director (Ghostbusters, Meatballs, Kindergarten Cop) and producer, founder of The Montecito Picture Company.
- 20 February: Ivan Matušík, 91, architect.
- 24 February: Viktória Cvengrošová, 80, architect (NTC Arena).
- 13 March: Ľubomír Roman, 77, actor (St. Peter's Umbrella, The Sun in a Net, Soul at Peace) and politician, member of the National Council (1994–1998), minister of culture (1994).
- 27 March: Titus Buberník, 88, footballer (ČH Bratislava, LASK Linz, Czechoslovakia national team).
- 6 April: Karol Divín, 86, Hungarian-born Slovak figure skater, Olympic silver medallist (1960).
- 14 June: Ondrej Rigo, 66, serial killer and necrophile.
- 7 July: Max Eisen, 93, Slovak-Canadian author and Holocaust survivor.
- 10 July: Ján Solovič, 88, writer, playwright and politician, member of the Slovak National Council (1971–1990).
- 30 July: Yitzchok Tuvia Weiss, 95, Slovak-born British-Israeli Haredi rabbi, head of the Edah HaChareidis (since 2004).
- 8 August: Jozef Tomko, 98, Roman Catholic cardinal, secretary general of the Synod of Bishops (1979–1985) and prefect for Evangelization of Peoples (1985–2001).
- 31 August: Alexander Horváth, 83, football player (MŠK Žilina, Slovan Bratislava) and manager (R.W.D. Molenbeek).
- 1 September: Ľudovít Komadel, 94, Olympic swimmer (1952) and sports physician.
- 8 September: Ľubomír Dobrík, 70, judge, member of the Constitutional Court (1997–2016).
- 22 September: Ladislav Švihran, 90, Belgian-born Slovak writer and translator.
- 14 October: Stanislav Kropilák, 67, Hall of Fame basketball player (Inter Bratislava, BK Pardubice, CEP Fleurus).
- 25 October: Branislav Hronec, 81, composer, pianist and conductor.
- 9 November: Ivan Čarnogurský, 89, businessman and politician, people's deputy of Czechoslovakia (1992).
- 5 December: Mária Kráľovičová, 95, actress.
- 10 December: Soňa Valentová, 76, actress (Witchhammer, The Feather Fairy, Requiem pro panenku).
- 12 December: Anton Šoltýs, 85, Olympic alpine skier (1964).
- 18 December: Hilda Augustovičová, 88, actress.
- 20 December: Vladimír Krčméry, 62, physician.
- 22 December: Anton Tkáč, 71, racing cyclist, Olympic champion (1976).
- 29 December: Miroslav Číž, 68, politician, MEP (since 2019) and MP (2002–2019).
- 30 December: Miklós Duray, 77, politician, Hungarian minority political representative in Slovakia, MP (1992–2010).
- 31 December: Barnabás Ferkó, 66, politician, MP (1994–2002).

== See also ==
- 2022 in the European Union
- 2022 in Europe
