= Life imprisonment in Slovakia =

Life imprisonment in Slovakia (Slovak: doživotný trest odňatia slobody) is a sentence of indeterminate length, lasting until the convict's death. In Slovak law, since the abolishment of the death penalty in 1990, it is the most severe punishment available. After 25 years, the prisoner can apply to the prosecutor to be released on probation. At any length of time, the prisoner may apply to President of Slovakia for clemency.

As of 2007 there were 28 people serving a life sentence in Slovakia, all of them located in two high-security prisons in Ilava and Leopoldov. Two prisoners have committed suicide while serving their sentences and there were no amnesties or releases on probation in the history of Slovakia. The list of people convicted for life in Slovakia includes the serial killer Ondrej Rigo, mafia boss Mikuláš Černák and mafia hitman Alojz Kromka.

== History ==
The last person to be executed in Slovakia is Štefan Svitek who was hanged on June 8, 1989, in Bratislava, then Czechoslovakia. Svitek murdered his wife and two daughters with an axe on October 30, 1987. Since January 1990 a non-written moratorium on death penalty was in place in Czechoslovakia. The death sentence was abolished on July 1, 1990, with the newly created Slovak Republic taking over the law common in Czechoslovakia and the death sentence was never renewed.

== Living conditions ==
People sentenced to life imprisonment in Slovakia are assigned three and a half meters squared space in their cell, which includes a bed, table, wardrobe, radio and electric lighting. Outside of their cells, they are always accompanied by a prison guard. They can only work inside their cells or in workplaces inside the prison. They are not allowed physical contact with their relatives.

== List of people sentenced to life imprisonment in Slovakia ==
This is a list of people sentenced to life imprisonment in Slovakia after its creation on January 1, 1993. The list should be complete as of April 25, 2022.

Name	Reason	Sentencing date	Highest Court sentencing	Notes
Tibor Polgári	mass murderer (6 murders with others)	February 2, 1993	-	Member of the 1991 Leopoldov Prison escape, the group killed 5 prison guards and one prisoner fighting their way out. Tibor Polgári was serving a 13-year sentence for extortion. He was the leader of the prison escape.
Miloš Uriga	mass murderer (6 murders with others)	February 2, 1993	-	Member of the 1991 Leopoldov Prison escape, the group killed 5 prison guards and one prisoner fighting their way out.
Jozef Slovák	serial killer (4 murders)	August 20, 1993	September 3, 1993	After serving just 8 years for the murder of a young Yugoslavian woman, serial killer Jozef Slovák was released on presidential amnesty. Together, he murdered at least 5 women aged 16 to 21 in Slovakia and Czech Republic. He is of above average intelligence and the holder of several patents in electronics.
Jaroslav Garaj	mass murderer (4 murders)	October 19, 1994	did not appeal to Highest Court	One morning, Jaroslav Garaj murdered his wife (34) and three children (two girls aged 3 and 2 and a boy aged 11 months) in the small village of Dubové, where they resided. Before drowning them, he raped the girls. He confessed to the murders, saying he wanted them to be free of pain, acting under the influence of Jehovah's Witnesses' literature.
Drahoslav Gembický	murderer (2 murders)	December 16, 1994	-	On March 14, 1993, in the village of Padarovce, Drahoslav Gembický murdered his father and grandmother with a wooden table leg, hitting their heads and beating them to death.
Róbert Matta	mass murderer (5 murders with Hauser)	May 24, 1995	-	Róbert Matta and Viliam Hauser from Bratislava murdered a Vietnamese family of five including a pregnant woman and a two-year-old child on April 8, 1994. They stormed the family's company DUK, s. r. o., on Stará Vajnorská cesta in Bratislava, shooting everyone with Škorpion vz. 61 sub-machine guns and suffocating the child with a pillow, stealing 1,5 million Slovak crowns.
Viliam Hauser	mass murderer (5 murders with Matta)	May 24, 1995	-	Viliam Hauser and Róbert Matta from Bratislava murdered a Vietnamese family of five including a pregnant woman and a two-year-old child on April 8, 1994. They stormed the family's company DUK, s. r. o., on Stará Vajnorská cesta in Bratislava, shooting everyone with Škorpion vz. 61 sub-machine guns and suffocating the child with a pillow, stealing 1,5 million Slovak crowns.
Štefan Mlynarovič (a.k.a. Džony)	murderer (1 murder)	September 11, 1995	-	After being sentenced to 25 years in 1976 for murdering his girlfriend in Bratislava, Štefan Mlynarovič (1942) was released in 1991 on probation. At this point, he has spent 30 years of his life in prison. On July 4, 1992, he murdered Anna Mikuličová in her apartment in Bratislava and he is the main suspect in the murder of a girl, a crime for which he was never convicted.
Jozef Vígh	murderer (1 murder with others)	March 23, 2000	-	In the early hours of September 2, 1999, Jozef Vígh from Čenkovice and Stanislav Zimmermann from Malá Lehota strangled their cellmate in Leopoldov Prison with a leather belt and laid his body in a way to suggest suicide. At this time, Jozef Vígh was already serving 15-year-long sentence. They were both convicted of the murder and their sentences have been changed to life imprisonment.
Stanislav Zimmermann	murderer (1 murder with others)	March 23, 2000	-	In the early hours of September 2, 1999, Jozef Vígh from Čenkovice and Stanislav Zimmermann from Malá Lehota strangled their cellmate in Leopoldov Prison with a leather belt and laid his body in a way to suggest suicide. At this time, Stanislav Zimmerman was already serving 17-year-long sentence. They were both convicted of the murder and their sentences have been changed to life imprisonment.
Viliam Feigler	murderer (2 murders with others)	June 16, 2000	-	Viliam Feigler was already sentenced 10 times before when in July 1997 he was living in an abandoned house on Lamačská cesta in Bratislava with a group of other homeless people. Together with Božena Mlčová and with quiet cooperation of Ján Szabó and Peter Cinege, over several days he slowly tortured to death two other homeless - Madunický and Pastorek. Together with Mlčová, they were both drunk all the time when they poured pure ethanol down the throats of their victims, hit them with metal rods and bricks, burned them and in the end, cut off their genitals.
Marek Zivala	serial killer (3 murders)	October 17, 2002	December 18, 2002	In 1996, Marek Zivala murdered Jaroslava K. (34) in Most in the Czech Republic and robbed her apartment, later murdering Božena M. (20) in 1997 in Žilina and Oľga V. (52) in 1998 in Topoľčany with the same modus operandi. He was found to be sane, but suffering from a polymorphic sexual deviancy with sadistic tendencies.
Ladislav Boldižár	murderer (3 murders)	sentenced by Highest Court, no appeal possible	November 21, 2002	The Highest Court overturned the decision of regional court in Nitra, which sentenced Ladislav Boldižár to 25 years in prison in favor of a life sentence for the shooting of his wife and her parents on July 16, 2000. Driving ahead of them, he forcibly stopped them near Nové Zámky and after an argument, he shot them all.
Alojz Kromka (a.k.a. Lojzo the Cleaner)	mafia hitman (3 murders)	September 30, 2003	June 10, 2004	While suspected by the Slovak police of numerous contract killings, including several mafia bosses and a ritual slaying of an ex-police officer, Alojz Kromka was finally sentenced for the murder of mafia boss Milan Holáň a.k.a. Gorila and two of his associates. After hearing the sentence, he tried—unsuccessfully—to escape from the courtroom.
Štefan Gemer	murderer (3 murders)	sentenced by regional court in Nitra, date unknown	September 22, 2004	In August 2002, Štefan Gemer murdered Marek Tilz, Júlia Galová and Marián Tilz (1) and attempted to shoot another two persons in the village Tupá. He was sentenced for 3 cases of murder, 2 cases of attempted murder and unlawful possession of a weapon.
Anton Tichý	murderer (2 murders)	February 15, 2005	June 14, 2005	Anton Tichý murdered Štefan Gaduš (67) in 1992 and František Kľúčiar (36) in 1994. He committed both crimes in Žilina and hid the bodies.
Henrich Masár	murderer (3 murders)	October 12, 2005	April 21, 2006	Henrich Masár murdered Mária Dananyová (74), Margita Šajtlavová and Peter Hanták. After a massive manhunt, he entered the house of the Rovenský family, where he took the family hostage. He was neutralized after trading the hostages for his girlfriend. He confessed to the murders, stating he was under the influence of drugs. His motivation was to rob the victims of money to buy drugs (presumably heroin).
František Jančo	murderer (2 murders)	March 2006	June 20, 2006	In August 2005, Jančo stabbed his girlfriend Helena Rudincová a total of 47 times, 44 in the neck and 3 in the chest. He had previously murdered his wife in a similar manner in 1993, stabbing her seven times during an argument.
Peter Grofčík	serial killer (3 murders)	2006	May 3, 2007	He was found guilty of committing three separate murders from 1992 to 2002, including that of his father.
Róbert Čačko	murderer (2 murders)	July 13, 2007	2009	Shortly after being paroled from serving a sentence for murder, he stabbed his father 14 times with a knife, killing him.
Peter Laduna	spree killer (3 murders)	sentenced by Highest Court, no appeal possible	November 7, 2007	Together with accomplices Jaroslav Bridzikov and Ľuboš Audy, engaged in robberies that resulted in Laduna killing a 48-year-old saleswoman at a jewelry store in Šurany and a 27-year-old jewelry store employee in Nové Mesto nad Váhom. He also killed his 17-year-old girlfriend Katarina H., who was buried in a shallow grave.
Rastislav Šitta	organized crime (4 murders)	September 17, 2007	October 27, 2009	See Jozef Kákoni below
Ján Karvai	theft (3 robberies)	December 3, 2008	May 21, 2009	Convicted on the basis of prevention from further crimes.
Branislav Adamčo	organized crime (2 murders)	February 24, 2009	September 13, 2010; Reaffirmed on May 22, 2015	Alleged boss of the Zemplín criminal group. He was convicted in February 2016 by a three-member senate of the Supreme Court for the murder of Arpád Nistor and other serious offenses. Adamčo is also facing other lawsuits in other Slovak courts, for example in the case of a double murder in Most pri Bratislave in 2004, among four other defendants.
Volodymyr J.	organized crime (4 murders with others)	February 27, 2009	appealed the sentence, waiting for verdict	-
Eduard V.	organized crime (4 murders with others)	February 27, 2009	appealed the sentence, waiting for verdict	-
Vasyl P.	organized crime (4 murders with others)	February 27, 2009	appealed the sentence, waiting for verdict	-
Jurij R.	organized crime (4 murders with others)	February 27, 2009	appealed the sentence, waiting for verdict	-
Tibor P.	murderer (1 murder with others)	November 6, 2009	appealed the sentence, waiting for verdict	In 2007, Tibor P. brutally murdered a security guard in a company based in Stupava, Malacky District. He denied the intent to kill, stating he went there only to steal.
Mikuláš Černák	organized crime (minimum 20 murders with others)	November 10, 2009	September 22, 2010	At one time, Mikuláš Černák, the boss of mafia in Banská Bystrica was considered to be one of the most powerful figures in the Slovak mafia. He was sentenced for life for the murder of Jozef Filip in 1994, Jozef Štefan in 1994, Pavel Lenhart in 1997, Milan Sipos and Emil Potasch in 1997, Gustáv Slivenský in 1997 and ordering the murder of Marián Karcel from prison in 2000. Originally convicted of personally murdering six people and ordering another, but he confessed to 20 more crimes in 2020.
Zoltán Keka	murderer (2 murders)	2010	June 1, 2010	In August 2009, Zoltán Keka murdered his father with a stick and a wooden log in the Slovak village of Kleňany. After the murder, he had 2,7 per mil blood alcohol content and his father was also drunk. He was abused by both his father and grandfather, whom he murdered in 1993 and served some time for this murder.
Miroslav Borbély	murderer (2 murders with others)	June 21, 2010	April 2011	Together with Zdeno M., Miroslav Borbély kidnapped and murdered a Bratislava couple Erik (35) and Miroslava (22) and shot them to death in October 2008. He confessed to the murder of Erik, but claims that Miroslava was murdered by Zdeno M., who was acquitted by the court.
Miroslav Dubaj	murderer (2 murders)	2010	April 6, 2011	Suffocated his father-in-law with a pillow in 2007, and later beat a postman to death in February 2010. His ex-wife was also convicted and sentenced to 25 years imprisonment.
Jozef Koky	robbery	2005	2012	Convicted on the basis of prevention from further crimes.
Arpád Nagy	sexual abuse of children	2011	-	Convicted on the basis of prevention from further crimes.
Štefan Szabó	murderer (2 murders)	October 16, 2013	2014 (?)	Murdered creditors Andrej Wolf and Tibor Kováč to avoid paying them money.
Jaroslav Potučko	organized crime (6 murders with others)	February 17, 2009	April 11, 2018	Member of Róbert Okoličány's gang. (see below)
Ladislav Somogyi	abduction attempt	October 18, 2018	-	Sentenced for egregious blackmail, attempted abduction and falsification of documents.
Róbert Lališ	organized crime (6 murders with others)	-	June 13, 2018	Businessman who heads the Sýkorov group, a criminal organization. Convicted for complicity in six murders.
Ivan Cupper	organized crime (6 murders with others)	-	June 13, 2018	Member of the Sýkorov group, a criminal organization. Convicted for complicity in six murders.
Ľubor Masár	murderer (1 murder with accomplice)	January 17, 1991	-	See Molnár.
Vladimír Lazovský	spree killer (3 murders)	December 3, 2004	-	Killed three pensioners during a robbery spree in September 2002.
Karol Pota	murderer (2 murders)	November 2011	January 9, 2013	Murdered retiree Jozef Z. in front of a tavern in Seňa in October 2000 after an argument. He later murdered his wife in May 2009 after she filed a complaint against him.
Miroslav Štolc	murderer (2 murders)	September 13, 2017	-	On February 19, 2017, Štolc stabbed his 28-year-old girlfriend in a boarding house in Radvaň, Banská Bystrica. He had previously poured sulfuric acid on another girlfriend in 1989 and had served an 11-year prison sentence for strangling an 18-year-old student in 1999.
Ivan Skalický	hired killer (2 murders with two others)	July 29, 2012	January 30, 2013	On the morning of July 20, 2010, Skalický and three other men shot 33-year-old businessman Jozef Mišenka in his car in Topoľčianky. The hit had been ordered by another businessman, Milan Pavlovič. Skalický, who had previously been convicted of murder, later attempted suicide in prison.
Ján Krajčík	organized crime (1 murder with others)	June 29, 2016	March 20, 2018	One of the perpetrators of the bombing of August 25, 2009, bombing of the Euromont company, in which courier Peter Hertel died.
Ladislav Molnár	murderer (2 murders)	January 15, 2018	September 4, 2018	Murdered two pensioners in Trnava on separate occasions in 2015.
Ondřej Holub	murderer (2 murders)	June 2002	October 2002 (Czech court); September 2005 (Slovak court)	In August 2001, Holub, a Slovak citizen who had served time for murder, heavily injured 26-year-old saleswoman Anna P. during a robbery a store in Prague, Czech Republic, with the victim succumbing to her injuries in November. Upon his request, he was extradited to serve his life sentence in a Slovak prison in September 2005.
Štefan Kollárik	terrorism	July 9, 2018	-	During November 2016, Kollárik, an employee at a chemical factory, sent threatening letters contaminated with americium to the Ministry of Justice, the regional court in Prešov and several district courts.
Roman Chocholáč	murderer (2 murders)	2012	March 27, 2018	Murdered his aunt and cousin in the village of Kotešová in November 2009.
Roman Barančík	murderer (1 murder)	-	July 3, 2018	Murdered his friend, a lawyer, while under the influence of alcohol. Had previously been convicted of juvenile delinquency in 1992.
Miroslav Kavický	murderer (2 murders)	September 17, 2018	February 5, 2019	Kavický, who had served a prison sentence for murder as a juvenile in 1978, was convicted of murdering 78-year-old bank clerk Ľudmila Kalinková in 2011. He had an accomplice who has never been identified.
Dávid Krátky	organized crime, production of illicit substances and murder	September 25, 2020	July 7, 2021	Together with his brother Dominik, the pair were convicted of running an organized criminal group, conspiring to support a criminal group, producing of illicit psychotropic substances, murder and other egregious offences.
Dominik Krátky	organized crime, production of illicit substances and murder	September 25, 2020	July 7, 2021	See Dávid Krátky (above)
Štefan Kozub	murderer (1 murder and 1 attempted murder)	December 16, 2021	-	Originally sentenced to 25 years imprisonment for shooting his girlfriend 70 times at their home in the village of Neded, but his sentence was changed to life on the recommendation of a psychologist. Kozub had previously been convicted of stabbing another girlfriend 43 times in 2004, but she survived her injuries.
Miroslav Vlček	murderer	June 20, 2024	-	According to the indictment, Miroslav Vlček ordered the kidnapping of his ex-wife to the premises of the warehouse in Veľký Ripňany, where he killed her. He then dissolved her remains in a plastic barrel with sulfuric and hydrochloric acid.

== Prisoners no longer serving their sentence ==
Name	Reason	Sentencing date	Crime	Reason
Ján Molnár	murderer (2 murders, one with accomplice)	January 17, 1991	Together with accomplice Ľubor Masár, they raped and strangled Dutch national Gabriela Widdershoven-Groen in Linz, Austria on August 23, 1990. Her husband René was seriously injured during the attack. They were the first Slovak nationals to be convicted for crimes committed abroad since the fall of Czechoslovakia. Molnár had previously been convicted of killing his girlfriend.	Died in Trenčín Prison Hospital on June 17, 2025, aged 83.
Ondrej Harvan	mass murderer (6 murders with others)	February 2, 1993	Member of the 1991 Leopoldov Prison escape, the group killed 5 prison guards and one prisoner fighting their way out.	Committed suicide on May 29, 1993, in his cell.
Ondrej Rigo	serial killer (9 murders)	December 7, 1994	The most prolific serial killer in Slovak history. Known as the Sock killer or International killer, Ondrej Rigo murdered 9 women in Bratislava, Munich and Amsterdam in the early 1990s. After smashing their heads, he would copulate with their bodies.	Died of a heart attack on June 16, 2022, aged 66.
Marián Kočiščák	murderer (1 murder)	March 29, 2001	During the midnight of September 23, 1999, 45-year-old Kočiščák struck his wife with an axe at least ten times at the family house in Čab, and then hit his 13-year-old son on the head at least four times. He left the scene believing that his victims were dead, but the son survived with severe injuries.	Kočiščák committed suicide in prison "several months" after being sentenced by the Highest Court.
Jozef Kákoni	organized crime (4 murders)	May 3, 2006	Member of the Kyselinári case, an organized crime scheme active in 2000–2001, which included carousel trading with fake computer software and several murders. The victims, including the gang's boss, were shot, dissolved in acid (hence the name in Slovak) and disposed of in the sewers, causing almost 4 million euro damage in taxes.	Died of a heart attack on March 1, 2015, aged 65.
Ondrej Neupauer	organized crime (3 murders with others)	June 6, 2006	Member of the Devín Bank scandal, a sophisticated scheme of economic crime (with estimated damages of 57 million Slovak crowns) that included the murders of Anton Bujňák, Zoltán Nyitrai and Štefan Holub.	Died in Leopoldov Prison in 2010.
Róbert Okoličány	organized crime (6 murders with others)	April 11, 2018 (in absentia)	The head of the East Slovak criminal group, Róbert Okoličány, and other members of the group were found guilty by the court of several acts, including conspiracy and support of the criminal group, several murders, violent attacks, extortion, illegal weapons or car theft. Members of the group Róbert Nigut and Jaroslav Potučko also received life sentences.	Okoličány escaped from prison and is currently on the run.
Róbert Nigut	organized crime (6 murders with others)	April 11, 2018 (in absentia)	Member of Róbert Okoličány's gang. (see above)	Police announced that Nigut was murdered by rival mafia members in Dolný Chotár sometime after his disappearance in 2013. Four men have been accused of his murder, but his body is yet to be found.
Jozef Roháč	organized crime (6 murders with others	December 10, 2018 (in absentia)	Mafioso and terrorist responsible for numerous underworld assassinations in Slovakia and Hungary	Currently serving a life sentence in a Hungarian prison for two murders and a bomb attack.

== See also ==
- Prisons in Slovakia
- Crime in Slovakia
