= Jozef Slovák =

Slovak serial killer

- Born: Jozef Slovák; April 7, 1951 (age 75); Plavecký Štvrtok, Czechoslovakia
- Other names: The Genius murderer The Bratislava strangler
- Conviction: Murder (specifically mass murder)
- Penalty: Life imprisonment (currently serving in Ilava, Slovakia)

Details
- Victims: 5
- Span of crimes: August 22, 1978 – July 16, 1991
- Country: Czechoslovakia
- Date apprehended: 1991; 35 years ago

Jozef Slovák (born 1951) is a Slovak serial killer who murdered at least five women in Czechoslovakia from 1978 to 1991 between the ages of 16 and 21. He is currently serving a life sentence for four murders in Ilava Prison in Slovakia.

Slovák remains one of the most significant participants in the controversial wide-ranging amnesty of the newly elected President of Czechoslovakia Václav Havel. Because of this amnesty, Slovák served only eight years in prison for the murder of a 21-year-old Yugoslavian woman, and after his release, murdered at least four other young women in less than a year and a half before again being captured. Jozef Slovák remains one of only two people convicted of a series of murders without any ties to organized crime in the modern history of Slovakia (the other being Ondrej Rigo).

== Early life ==
Little is known about Slovák's early life. He was born in Plavecký Štvrtok, Czechoslovakia (present-day Slovakia) on April 7, 1951. Altogether, he was sentenced to prison eight times during his life.

== Murders ==
Jozef Slovák was convicted of the murder of five women, listed below.

Name	Age	Status	Date of Attack	Location
Blažica P.	21	Killed	August 22, 1978	Železná studienka, Bratislava
Monika Ondíková	16	Killed	July 4, 1990	Konopiště u Benešova
Vladislava Maříková	18	Killed	late July 1990	Kamzík hill, Bratislava
Diana Lopuchovská	17	Killed	June 26, 1991	Záhorská Bystrica, Bratislava
Anna Královičová	18	Killed	July 16, 1991	Železná studienka, Bratislava

Jozef Slovák met his first victim, Yugoslavian woman Blažica P. on a train. On August 22, 1978, he took her into the woods in Bratislava, Železná studnička (today part of Bratislava Forest Park) and tried to have sex with her. As she refused and tried to fight back, he choked her to death. After the murder, he dragged her body deeper into the forest and covered it with branches. After burning some of Blažica P.'s clothing right there in the forest, he gave some of the things she had on her body to his girlfriend.

In 1982, Slovák was sentenced to 15 years in prison for this first murder. He started to serve his sentence in Leopoldov Prison but was released on probation March 10, 1990 because of a wide-ranging amnesty by president of Czechoslovakia Václav Havel. Almost two-thirds of Czechoslovak criminals at that time were released from prison practically at the same time. Many murderers, career criminals and other dangerous people were released from prisons on probation or parole. Without the amnesty, Slovák would not have been released until 1997. From 1990 to 1991, Slovák murdered at least four women, committing his second murder just four months after being released from prison.

He met his second victim, Monika Ondíková (from Moldava nad Bodvou), in Prague. On July 4, 1990, he left the capital with her for Konopiště, near Benešov, about 50 km (30 mi) southeast of Prague. In the manor park, Jozef Slovák shot her eight times from his gas gun, using neuroparalytic gas. Then, he hit her in the head several times with a stick, killing her. He searched the body, finding and stealing US$2,400, 800 German marks, over 16,000 Austrian schillings, a ring and her makeup. Again, he dragged the body deeper into the nearby forest and covered it with branches. Slovák returned to her body a week later to put a railway ticket to České Budějovice into her pocket, trying to confuse the police.

Two days after his last murder, Slovák was arrested in Bratislava. Bruises were found on his body caused by Anna Královičová. The police also found an illegal firearm.

On August 20, 1993, he was sentenced to life imprisonment by the City Court of Bratislava for the murders of Monika Ondíková, Vladislava Maříková, Diana Lopuchovská and Anna Královičová.

In 1997, Slovák complained to Ilava city representatives that he was unable to create any new inventions in his field of electronics, mainly because of the lack of tools and not having access to a typewriter.

== See also ==
- List of people sentenced to life imprisonment in Slovakia
- List of serial killers by country

== Sources ==
- Kriminalistika.eu - "Kriminalistika: Muzeum zločinu" (in Czech)
- Interview with Jozef Slovák in Šarm magazine (in Slovak) from 2008
