= Lampert Hont-Pázmány =

Lampert Hont-Pázmány (Hungarian: Hont-Pázmány nembeli Lampert) may refer to:

- Lampert Hont-Pázmány (lord), Hungarian lord and founder of the Bozók Abbey (died 1132)
- Lampert Hont-Pázmány (bishop), Hungarian prelate, Bishop of Eger (died 1275)
