= Bzovík =

Bzovík Bozók
- Municipality
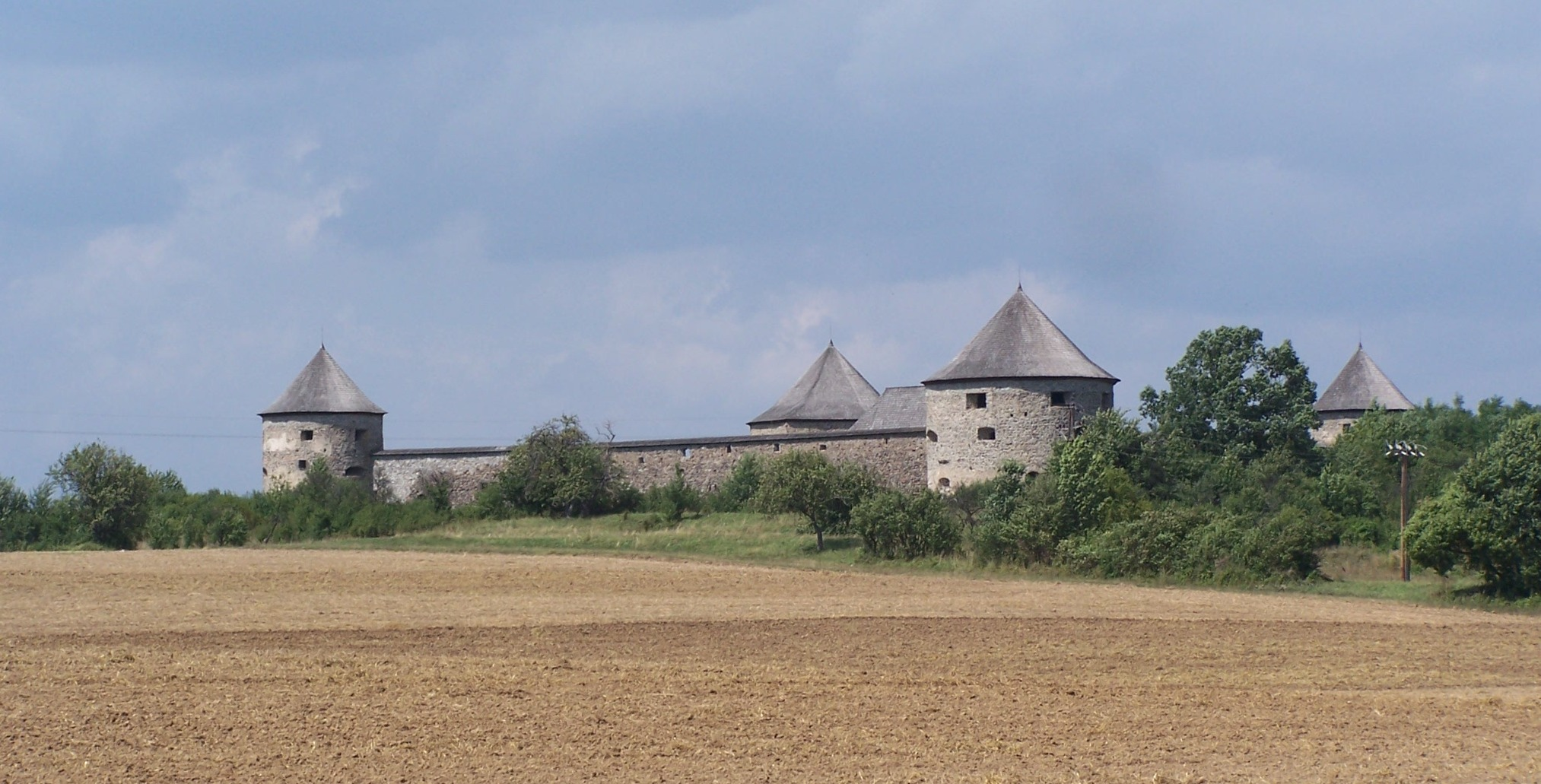
- Bzovík Castle

- Flag

- Location of Bzovík in the Banská Bystrica Region Location of Bzovík in Slovakia
- Coordinates: 48.32°N 19.09°E
- Country: Slovakia
- Region: Banská Bystrica Region
- District: Krupina District
- First mentioned: 1135

Area
  - Total: 12.99 km^{2} (5.02 sq mi)
- Elevation: 339 m (1,112 ft)

Population (2025)
  - Total: 1,102
- Time zone: UTC+1 (CET)
  - Summer (DST): UTC+2 (CEST)
- Postal code: 962 41
- Area code: +421 45
- Vehicle registration plate (until 2022): KA
- Website: www.obecbzovik.sk/Obec

Bzovík (Hungarian: Bozók) is a village and municipality in the Krupina District of the Banská Bystrica Region of Slovakia.

== Geography ==
The municipality lies at an altitude of 339 metres (1,112 ft) and covers an area of 12.99 km^{2} (5.02 sq mi) (2025).

== History ==
In historical records, the village was first mentioned in 1135 (Bozouk) when the noble Lampert Hont-Pázmány founded a Cistercian abbey here. In 1433 Bzovík was destroyed by Hussites and in the mid-15th century by commanders from the Krupina Castle. From 1530 to 1567 it belonged to Žigmund Balaša (Hungarian: Zsigmond Balassa). 1567 – 1658 it belonged to the landowners Fánchy and in 1678 it passed to the Jesuits of Esztergom.

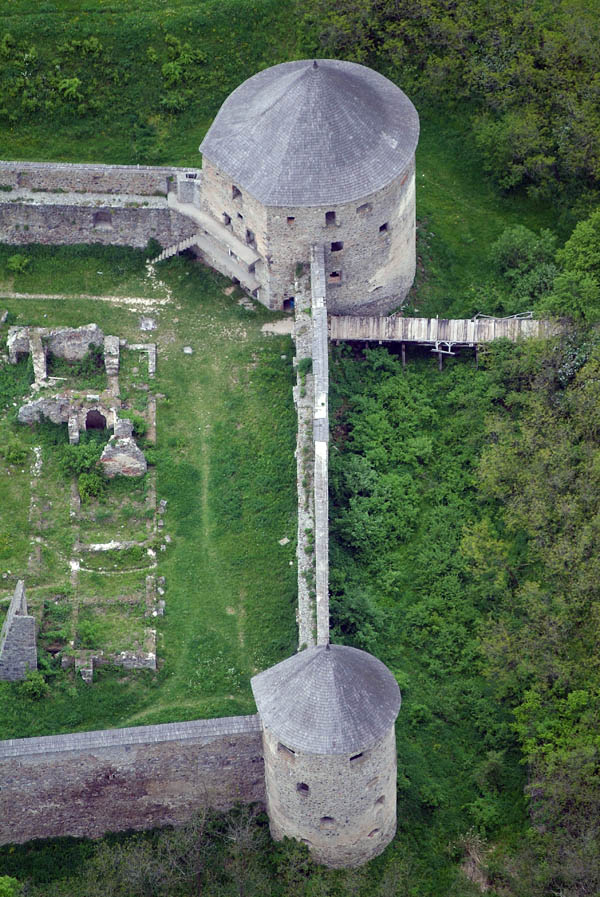

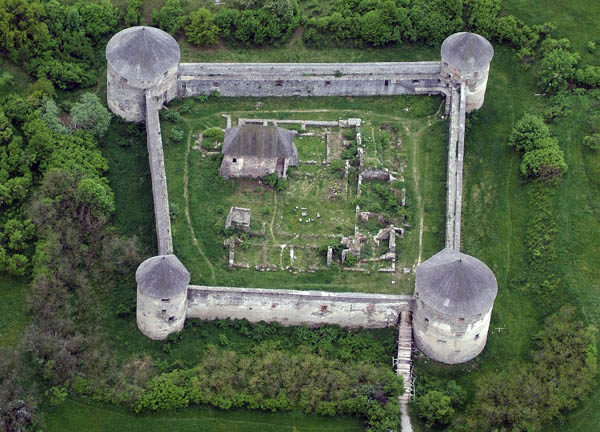

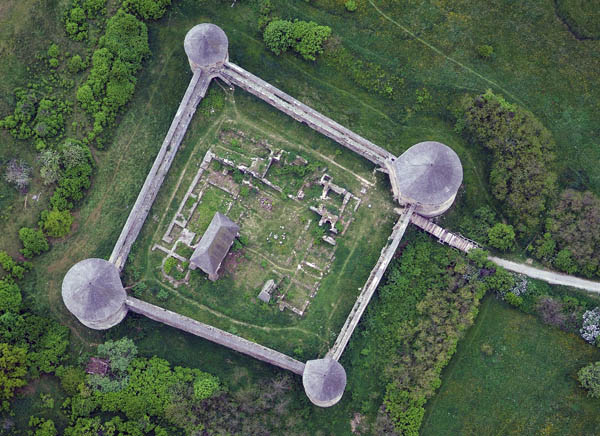

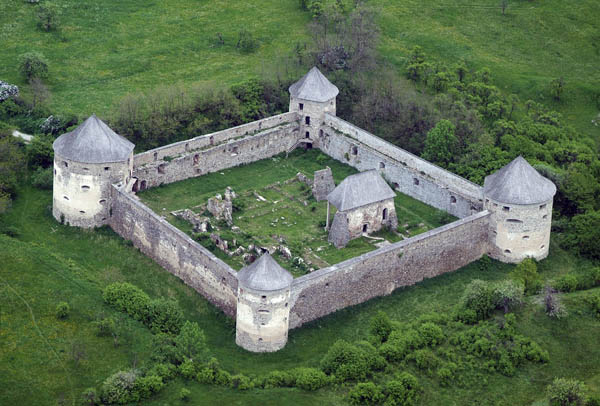

== Population ==
Population statistic (10 years)
Year	1995	2005	2015	2025
Count	931	1075	1144	1102
Difference		+15.46%	+6.41%	−3.67%

Population statistic
Year	2024	2025
Count	1116	1102
Difference		−1.25%

It has a population of 1102 people (31 December 2025).

=== Ethnicity ===
Census 2021 (1+ %)
Ethnicity	Number	Fraction
Slovak	1114	98.67%
Romani	37	3.27%
Not found out	12	1.06%
Total	1129	

In year 2021 was 1129 people by ethnicity 1114 as Slovak, 37 as Romani, 12 as Not found out, 4 as Other, 3 as German, 2 as Czech, 2 as Italian and 2 as Hungarian.

Note on population: The difference values of population numbers in the table "Population statistic" and in the sections "Ethnicity" & "Religion" is caused by the use of various statistical methods.

=== Religion ===
Census 2021 (1+ %)
Religion	Number	Fraction
Roman Catholic Church	863	76.44%
None	185	16.39%
Evangelical Church	49	4.34%
Total	1129	

In year 2021 was 1129 people by religion 863 from Roman Catholic Church, 185 from None, 49 from Evangelical Church, 9 from Greek Catholic Church, 7 from Not found out, 7 from Ad hoc movements, 5 from Christian Congregations in Slovakia, 2 from Other and not ascertained christian church, 1 from Islam and 1 from Buddhism.

== Genealogical resources ==
The records for genealogical research are available at the state archive "Statny Archiv in Banska Bystrica, Slovakia"

- Roman Catholic church records (births/marriages/deaths): 1686-1895 (parish A)
- Lutheran church records (births/marriages/deaths): 1786-1895 (parish B)

== See also ==
- List of municipalities and towns in Slovakia
