= Bzovík Castle =

Historic site in Slovakia

Coordinates: 48°18′55″N 19°05′24″E

- Bzovík Hrad
- Bzovík, Banská Bystrica Region, Slovakia
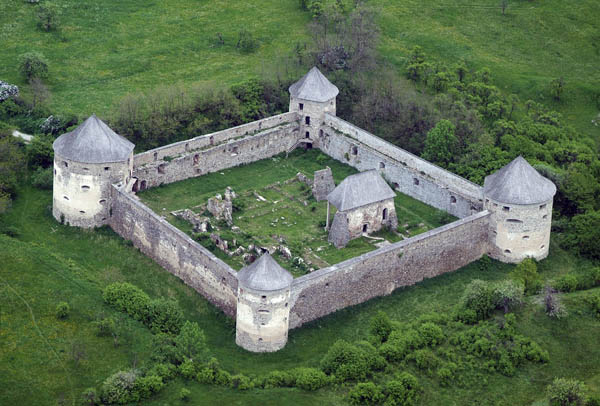

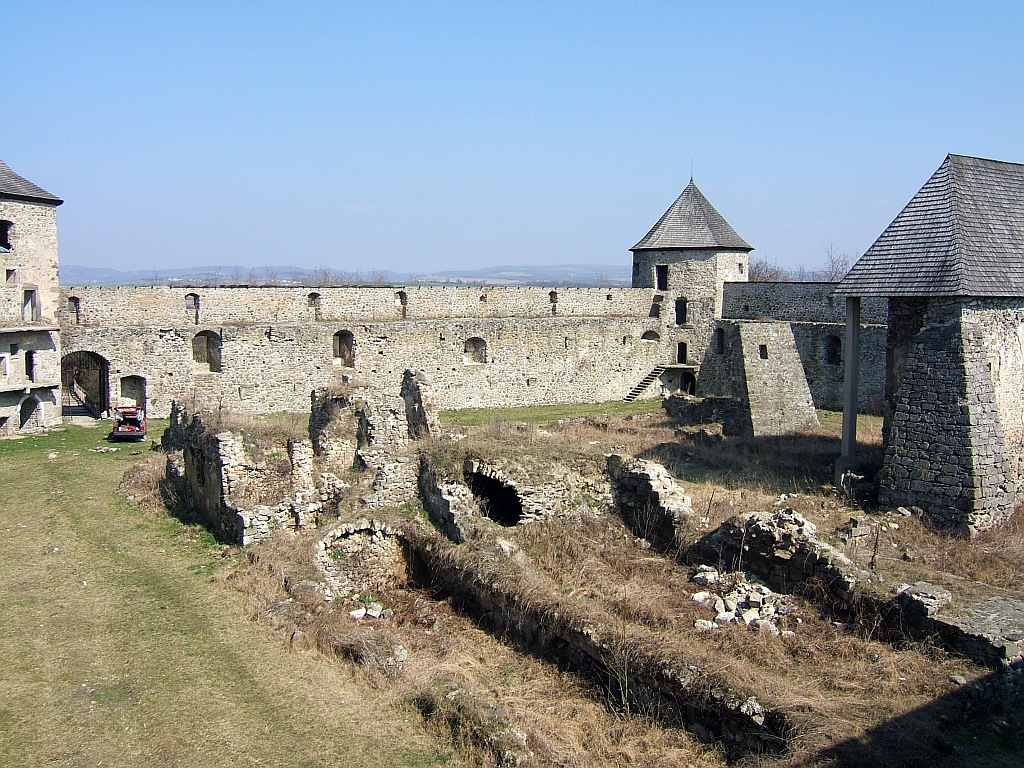
- Inside the castle walls

Site information
- Type: Castle
- Open to the public: yes
- Condition: Mostly in ruins

Site history
- Built: Around 1130

Bzovík Castle (Slovak:Bzovík Hrad; also sometimes referred to as Bzovík Fortress), is a castle located in the village of Bzovík in the Banská Bystrica Region of Slovakia. The castle is registered as a National heritage site in Slovakia.

== History ==
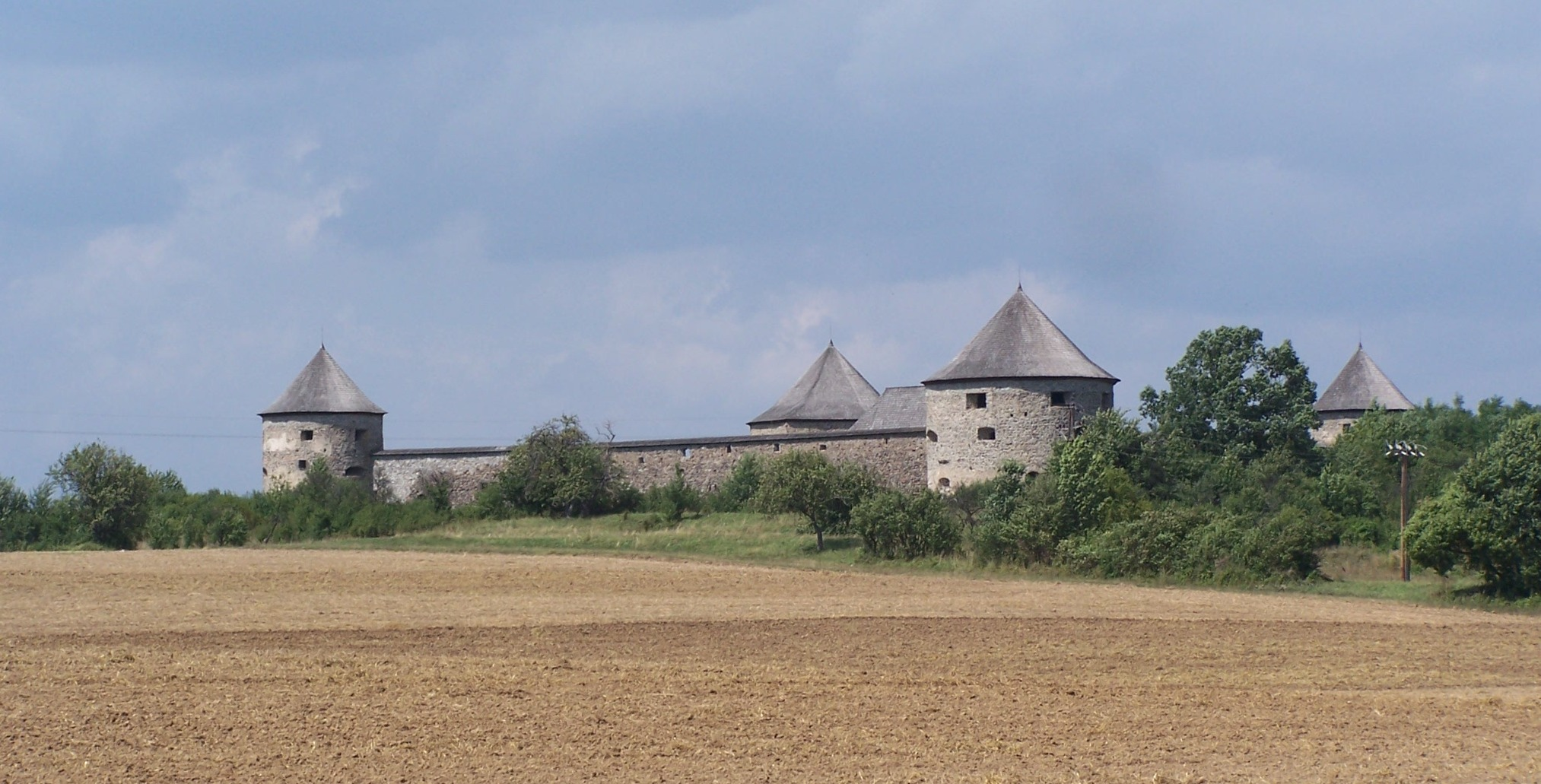
The castle as is seen from the outside the walls.

In 2023, the castle was renovated with the help of volunteers. The project was originally meant to cost 221,692 euros but had increased to almost half-a-million euros.

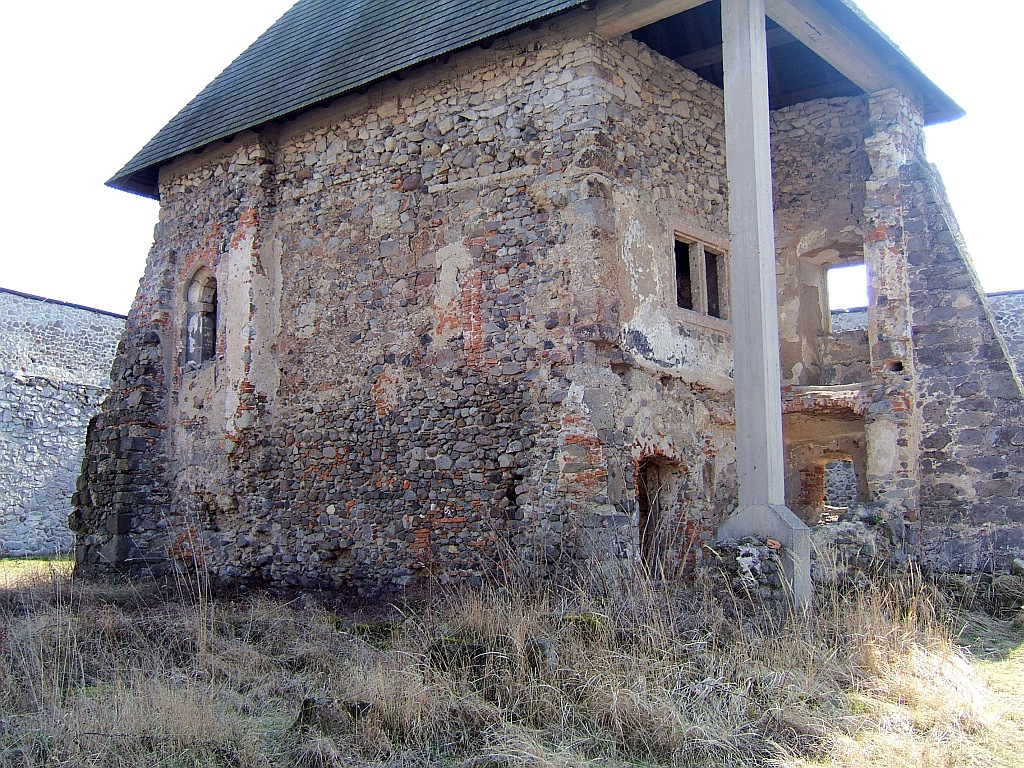
The church.

== See also ==
- List of castles in Slovakia
- WikiMedia Commons has media related to Bzovík Castle.
