= Marek Zivala =

Convicted Slovak serial killer

- Born: 1951 (age 74–75); Vranov nad Topľou, Czechoslovakia
- Conviction: Murder x3
- Penalty: Life imprisonment without parole

Details
- Victims: 3
- Span of crimes: 1996–1998
- Country: Czech Republic, Slovakia
- States: Ústí nad Labem, Žilina, Nitra
- Date apprehended: 1998
- Imprisoned at: Leopoldov Prison

Marek Zivala (born 1951) is a Slovak serial killer responsible for the murders of three women in the Czech Republic and Slovakia between 1996 and 1998. A diagnosed sexual deviant, he was sentenced to life imprisonment without parole for his crimes.

== Murders ==
Zivala, who had five previous convictions for theft in both Slovakia and Germany, first contacted 34-year-old Jaroslava K. on October 26, 1996, by writing her a letter, proposing that the pair go out and have dinner in Most, Czech Republic. Instead, he brought her to an apartment in the city, where he handcuffed and gagged Jaroslava with a towel, before tying her hands and feet with a wire and a clothesline. In the process, the woman choked to death. After her death, Zivala stole furs and gold jewellery from the apartment, which he later sold for around 13,600 Czech koruny.

A year later, on September 26, 1997, he lured 21-year-old Božena M., a woman he had been going out with for some time, to an apartment in Žilina, Slovakia. When they settled in, he grabbed hold of her and stuffed two socks down her throat, before strangling Božena by wrapping her head in a plastic bag. Zivala then stole a video recorder and a mountain bike, both worth approximately 10,000 Slovak koruny, and fled the area. When examining the crime scene, DNA from some cigarette butts left at the apartment forensically linked him to the murder.

Despite being sought after by law enforcement, Zivala earned the trust of 52-year-old disabled pensioner and mother of two Olga V., who invited him to stay over at her apartment in Topoľčany. While talking, Zivala began to make sexual advances towards her, but was rejected by Olga. Angered by the idea of being turned down, he grabbed some tape from the stolen tape recorder, with which he then strangled the woman. After killing her, he stole several pieces of jewellery worth 27, 250 Slovak koruny, which he also later sold.

== Arrest, trial and imprisonment ==
Just hours after his last kill, Zivala approached and successfully seduced a 26-year-old university student in Veľký Meder, who agreed to have sex with him in a hotel room in Nitra. However, while making love, she noticed that her partner tried to wrap a belt around her neck, something she fiercely and successfully resisted. Fearing that he would be caught, Zivala fled, but not long after, he was finally apprehended by police in Dubnica nad Váhom.

During his subsequent interrogation, Zivala admitted to all three murders, but blamed the victims for "humiliating" him, refusing to accept responsibility for his crimes. He was ordered to undergo several psychiatric evaluations, with the psychiatrists determining that he was a sexual sadist with homosexual tendencies and high intelligence. After a 4-year-long trial, the Nitra Regional Court found him guilty of all three murders and sentenced Zivala to life imprisonment without parole. To this day, he is serving his sentence with other life-sentenced inmates at the Leopoldov Prison.

== See also ==
- List of people sentenced to life imprisonment in Slovakia
- List of serial killers by country
