= Hontianske Moravce =

Hontianske Moravce Hontmarót
- Municipality
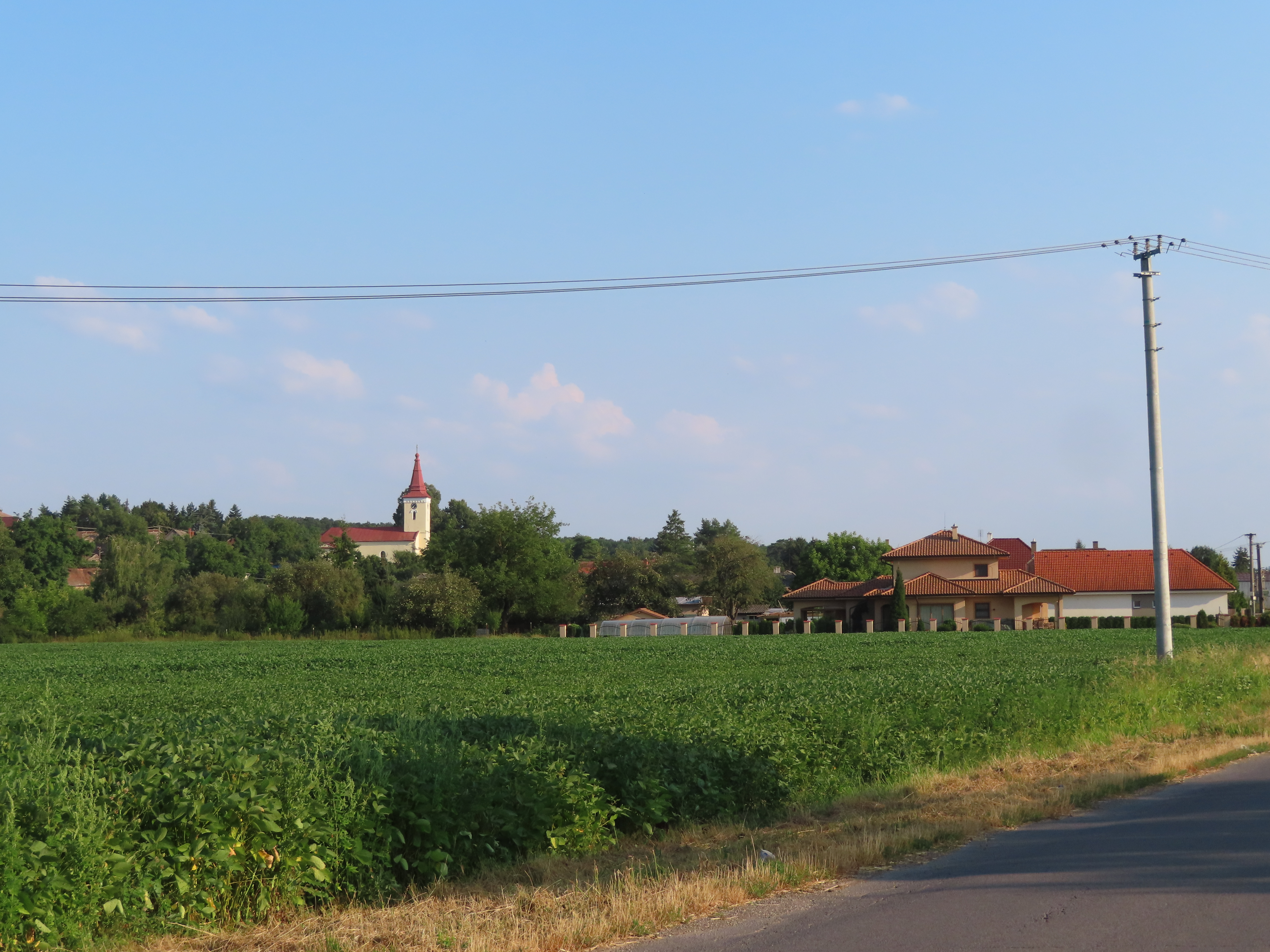

- Flag

- Location of Hontianske Moravce in the Banská Bystrica Region Location of Hontianske Moravce in Slovakia
- Coordinates: 48.18°N 18.85°E
- Country: Slovakia
- Region: Banská Bystrica Region
- District: Krupina District
- First mentioned: 1245

Area
  - Total: 16.83 km^{2} (6.50 sq mi)
- Elevation: 147 m (482 ft)

Population (2025)
  - Total: 755
- Time zone: UTC+1 (CET)
  - Summer (DST): UTC+2 (CEST)
- Postal code: 962 70
- Area code: +421 45
- Vehicle registration plate (until 2022): KA
- Website: www.moravce.sk

Hontianske Moravce (Hungarian: Hontmarót) is a village situated in southern central Slovakia in Krupina District in the Banská Bystrica Region near the cities of Zvolen (50 km) and Levice (20 km).

== Geography ==
The municipality lies at an altitude of 147 metres (482 ft) and covers an area of 16.83 km^{2} (6.50 sq mi) (2025).

== Population ==
Population statistic (10 years)
Year	1995	2005	2015	2025
Count	795	881	858	755
Difference		+10.81%	−2.61%	−12.00%

Population statistic
Year	2024	2025
Count	745	755
Difference		+1.34%

It has a population of 755 people (31 December 2025).

=== Ethnicity ===
Census 2021 (1+ %)
Ethnicity	Number	Fraction
Slovak	705	90.26%
Not found out	43	5.5%
Ukrainian	29	3.71%
Other	10	1.28%
Hungarian	8	1.02%
Total	781	

In year 2021 was 781 people by ethnicity 705 as Slovak, 43 as Not found out, 29 as Ukrainian, 10 as Other, 8 as Hungarian, 5 as Rusyn, 5 as Romanian, 3 as Czech, 3 as Romani, 2 as Polish, 2 as Greek, 1 as Jewish and 1 as Russian.

Note on population: The difference values of population numbers in the table "Population statistic" and in the sections "Ethnicity" & "Religion" is caused by the use of various statistical methods.

=== Religion ===
Census 2021 (1+ %)
Religion	Number	Fraction
Roman Catholic Church	352	45.07%
Evangelical Church	205	26.25%
None	121	15.49%
Not found out	51	6.53%
Eastern Orthodox Church	34	4.35%
Total	781	

In year 2021 was 781 people by religion 352 from Roman Catholic Church, 205 from Evangelical Church, 121 from None, 51 from Not found out, 34 from Eastern Orthodox Church, 6 from Buddhism, 3 from Other and not ascertained christian church, 3 from Ad hoc movements, 2 from Greek Catholic Church, 1 from Paganism and natural spirituality, 1 from Christian Congregations in Slovakia, 1 from Hinduism and 1 from Bahá'i Community.

== Famous people ==
- Jaro Filip, artist
- Ladislav Svihran, writer

== Genealogical resources ==
The records for genealogical research are available at the state archive "Statny Archiv in Bratislava, Banska Bystrica, Bytca, Kosice, Levoca, Nitra, Presov, Slovakia"

== See also ==
- List of municipalities and towns in Slovakia
