= Hilda Augustovičová =

Slovak actress (1934–2022)

- Born: 6 August 1934; Budmerice, Czechoslovakia
- Died: 18 December 2022 (aged 88)
- Education: Academy of Performing Arts in Bratislava
- Occupation: Actress
- Years active: 1952–2007

Hilda Augustovičová (6 August 1934 – 18 December 2022) was a Slovak actress and theatre manager.

== Life and career ==
Augustovičová was born in the village of Budmerice on 6 August 1934. She grew up in Pezinok.

Augustovičová was among the first graduates of the Academy of Performing Arts in Bratislava. In 1952 she joined the Janko Borodáč theatre in Nitra as an actress, where she spent her entire career. From 1972 to 1982 she was the art director of the theatre and from 1982 to 1990 she led the theatre as its director. During her tenure as the director, a new theatre building was constructed. Her last performance as an actress took place in 2007.

Augustovičová died on 18 December 2022, at the age of 88.
