= Barnabás Ferkó =

Slovak politician (1956–2022)

Member of the National Council
- In office 30 September 1994 – 15 October 2002

Personal details
- Born: 29 April 1956
- Died: 31 December 2022 (aged 66)
- Party: Hungarian Coalition Party

Barnabás Ferkó (29 April 1956 – 31 December 2022) was an ethnic Hungarian politician in Slovakia, who served as a Member of the National Council between 1994 and 2002. He was a member of the Party of the Hungarian Coalition.

After leaving politics, he worked as the Director of policlinic in Veľké Kapušany.
