= Kosihovce =

- Municipality
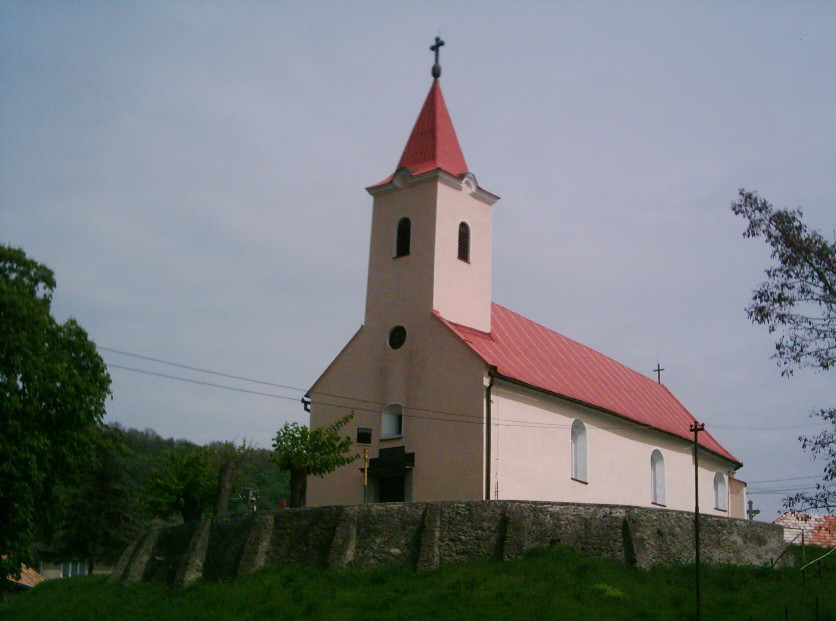

- Location of Kosihovce in the Banská Bystrica Region Location of Kosihovce in Slovakia
- Coordinates: 48°11′N 19°13′E
- Country: Slovakia
- Region: Banská Bystrica
- District: Veľký Krtíš

Area
  - Total: 20.68 km^{2} (7.98 sq mi)
- Elevation: 269 m (883 ft)

Population (2025)
  - Total: 555
  - Density: 4.07/km^{2} (10.53/sq mi)
- Time zone: UTC+1 (CET)
  - Summer (DST): UTC+2 (CEST)
- Postal code: 991 25
- Area code: +421 47
- Vehicle registration plate (until 2022): VK
- Website: kosihovce.ek

Kosihovce (Hungarian: Dacsókeszi) is a village and municipality in the Veľký Krtíš District of the Banská Bystrica Region of southern Slovakia.

== Geography ==
The municipality lies at an altitude of 269 metres (883 ft) and covers an area of 20.68 km^{2} (7.98 sq mi) (2025).

== Population ==
Population statistic (10 years)
Year	1995	2005	2015	2025
Count	600	593	574	555
Difference		−1.16%	−3.20%	−3.31%

Population statistic
Year	2024	2025
Count	561	555
Difference		−1.06%

It has a population of 555 people (31 December 2025).

=== Ethnicity ===
Census 2021 (1+ %)
Ethnicity	Number	Fraction
Slovak	430	76.92%
Hungarian	174	31.12%
Romani	7	1.25%
Total	559	

In year 2021 was 559 people by ethnicity 430 as Slovak, 174 as Hungarian, 7 as Romani, 5 as Not found out and 2 as Russian.

Note on population: The difference values of population numbers in the table "Population statistic" and in the sections "Ethnicity" & "Religion" is caused by the use of various statistical methods.

=== Religion ===
Census 2021 (1+ %)
Religion	Number	Fraction
Roman Catholic Church	442	79.07%
None	57	10.2%
Evangelical Church	44	7.87%
Greek Catholic Church	7	1.25%
Total	559	

In year 2021 was 559 people by religion 442 from Roman Catholic Church, 57 from None, 44 from Evangelical Church, 7 from Greek Catholic Church, 3 from Calvinist Church, 2 from Jehovah's Witnesses, 2 from Not found out, 1 from Buddhism and 1 from Ad hoc movements.

== Genealogical resources ==
The records for genealogical research are available at the state archive "Statny Archiv in Banska Bystrica, Slovakia"

- Roman Catholic church records (births/marriages/deaths): 1755-1890 (parish B)
- Lutheran church records (births/marriages/deaths): 1728-1897 (parish B)

== See also ==
- List of municipalities and towns in Slovakia
