= Kamenné Kosihy =

Kamenné Kosihy Kőkeszi
- Municipality
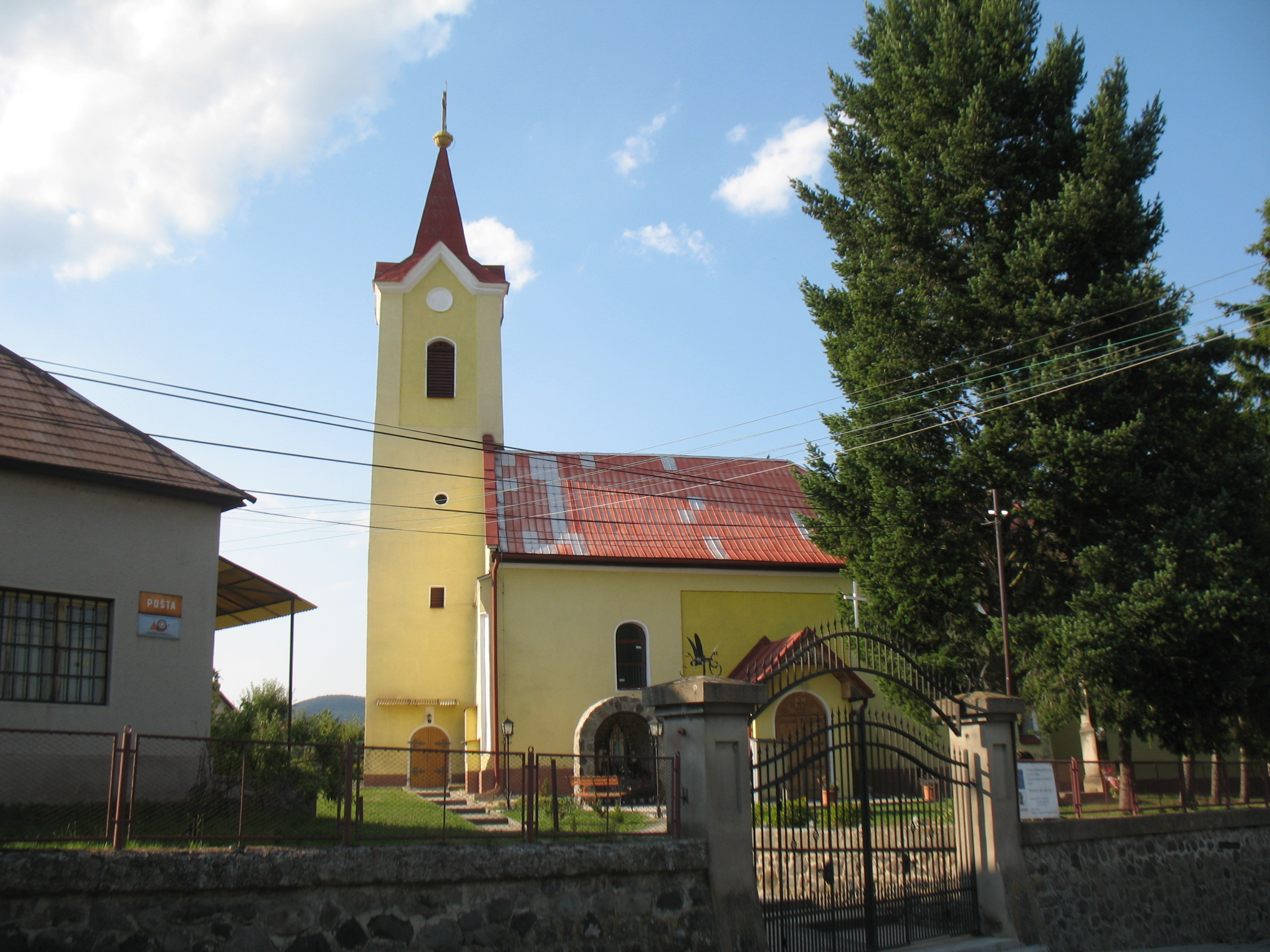

- Flag

- Location of Kamenné Kosihy in the Banská Bystrica Region Location of Kamenné Kosihy in Slovakia
- Coordinates: 48.15°N 19.20°E
- Country: Slovakia
- Region: Banská Bystrica Region
- District: Veľký Krtíš District
- First mentioned: 1135

Area
  - Total: 5.01 km^{2} (1.93 sq mi)
- Elevation: 197 m (646 ft)

Population (2025)
  - Total: 355
- Time zone: UTC+1 (CET)
  - Summer (DST): UTC+2 (CEST)
- Postal code: 991 27
- Area code: +421 47
- Vehicle registration plate (until 2022): VK
- Website: kamennekosihy.sk

Kamenné Kosihy (Hungarian: Kőkeszi) is a village and municipality in the Veľký Krtíš District of the Banská Bystrica Region of southern Slovakia.

== Geography ==
The municipality lies at an altitude of 197 metres (646 ft) and covers an area of 5.01 km^{2} (1.93 sq mi) (2025).

== Etymology ==
The village was named after the Magyar tribe Keszi.

== Population ==
Population statistic (10 years)
Year	1995	2005	2015	2025
Count	378	356	338	355
Difference		−5.82%	−5.05%	+5.02%

Population statistic
Year	2024	2025
Count	359	355
Difference		−1.11%

It has a population of 355 people (31 December 2025).

=== Ethnicity ===
Census 2021 (1+ %)
Ethnicity	Number	Fraction
Hungarian	236	67.23%
Slovak	153	43.58%
Not found out	8	2.27%
Total	351	

In year 2021 was 351 people by ethnicity 236 as Hungarian, 153 as Slovak, 8 as Not found out, 3 as Czech and 2 as Russian.

Note on population: The difference values of population numbers in the table "Population statistic" and in the sections "Ethnicity" & "Religion" is caused by the use of various statistical methods.

=== Religion ===
Census 2021 (1+ %)
Religion	Number	Fraction
Roman Catholic Church	323	92.02%
None	18	5.13%
Total	351	

In year 2021 was 351 people by religion 323 from Roman Catholic Church, 18 from None, 3 from Greek Catholic Church, 2 from Not found out, 2 from Evangelical Church, 1 from Other and not ascertained christian church, 1 from Christian Congregations in Slovakia and 1 from Buddhism.

== Genealogical resources ==
The records for genealogical research are available at the state archive "Statny Archiv in Banska Bystrica, Slovakia"

- Roman Catholic church records (births/marriages/deaths): 1735-1904 (parish A)
- Lutheran church records (births/marriages/deaths): 1721-1862 (parish B)

== See also ==
- List of municipalities and towns in Slovakia
