= Viktória Cvengrošová =

Slovak architect (1941–2022)

- Born: 4 July 1941; Radošina, Slovakia
- Died: 24 February 2022 (aged 80); Bratislava, Slovakia
- Education: Slovak University of Technology in Bratislava
- Occupation: Architect
- Buildings: National Tennis Centre

Viktória Cvengrošová (4 July 1941 – 24 February 2022) was a Slovak architect.

== Life ==
Cvengrošová was born in Radošina. She moved to Bratislava to study architecture at the Slovak University of Technology in Bratislava and remained in the city since her graduation in 1965. Before the Velvet Revolution, she focused on designing schools and cultural institutions. In 1994, she co-founded the architecture studio CD TEAM with Virgil Droppa Sr. She is buried in Bratislava.

== Work ==
She is notable for designing prominent cultural and sport venues in Bratislava as well as the renovation of historical buildings of the Old Market Hall of Bratislava and Nedbalka Gallery in the historical centre of the city. Most of her eminent work was a result of the cooperation with her life and business partner Virgil Droppa Sr.

The list of most prominent designs by Cvengrošová includes:

- L+S Studio (1982), A multi-purpose cultural space on the premises of the Tatra Hotel in the centre of Bratislava.
- "ABC" highway rest area decorated with modern art (1987, with Virgil Droppa Sr. and Alexander Bilkovič). Demolished in 2021.
- Headquarters of Markíza TV station (late 1990s) in the Záhorská Bystrica borough of Bratislava.
- National Tennis Centre (2003) in Bratislava.

== Gallery ==
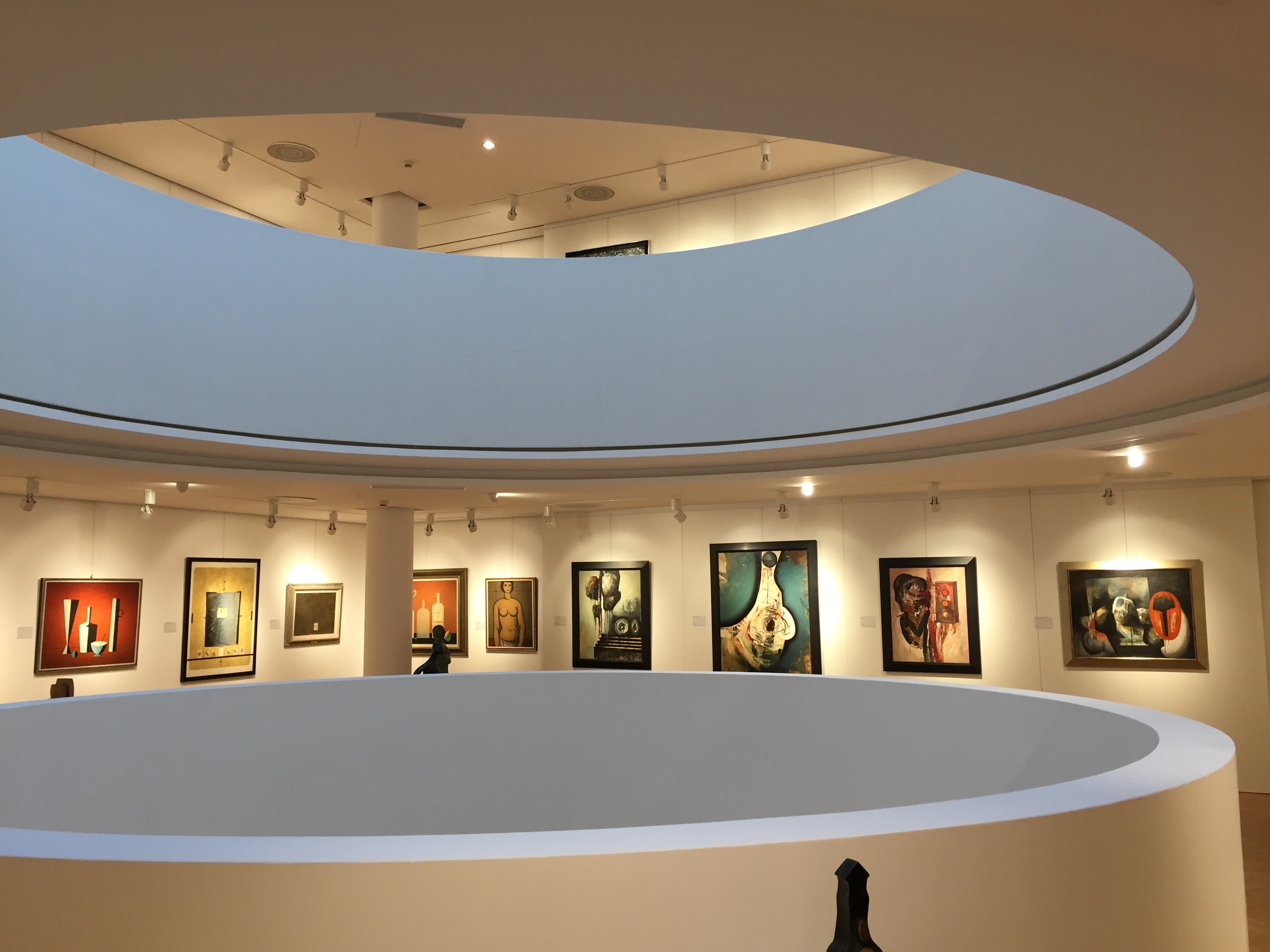
Nedbalka Gallery in Bratislava

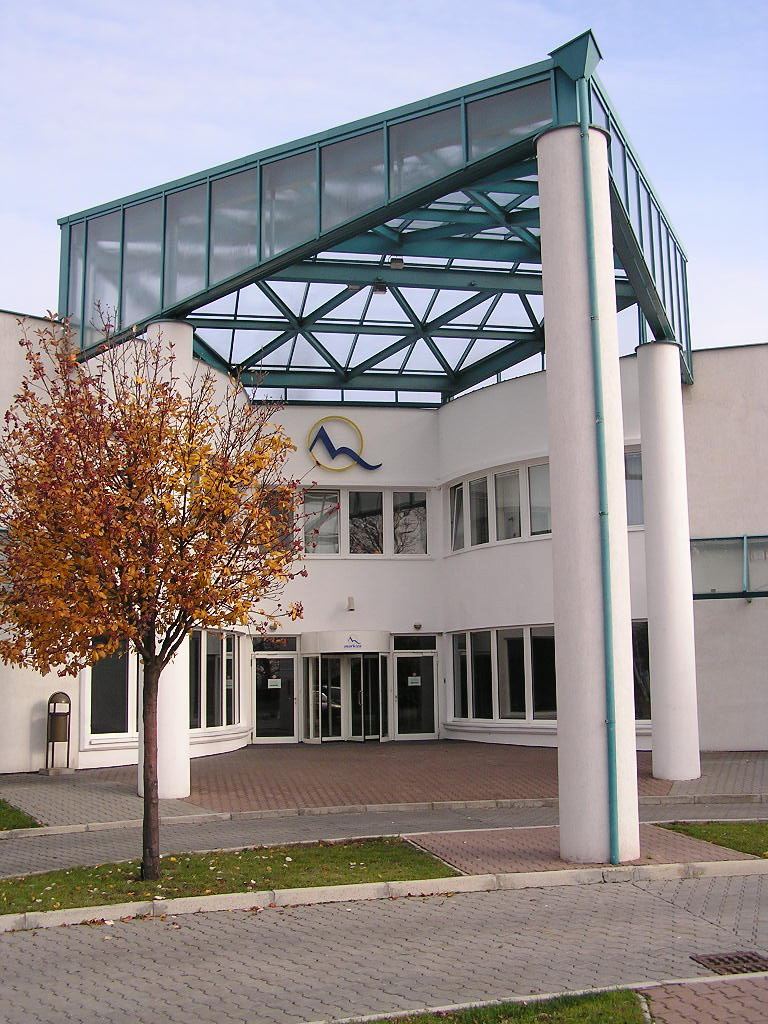
Headquarters of Markíza
