= Tupá =

Tupá Tompa
- Municipality
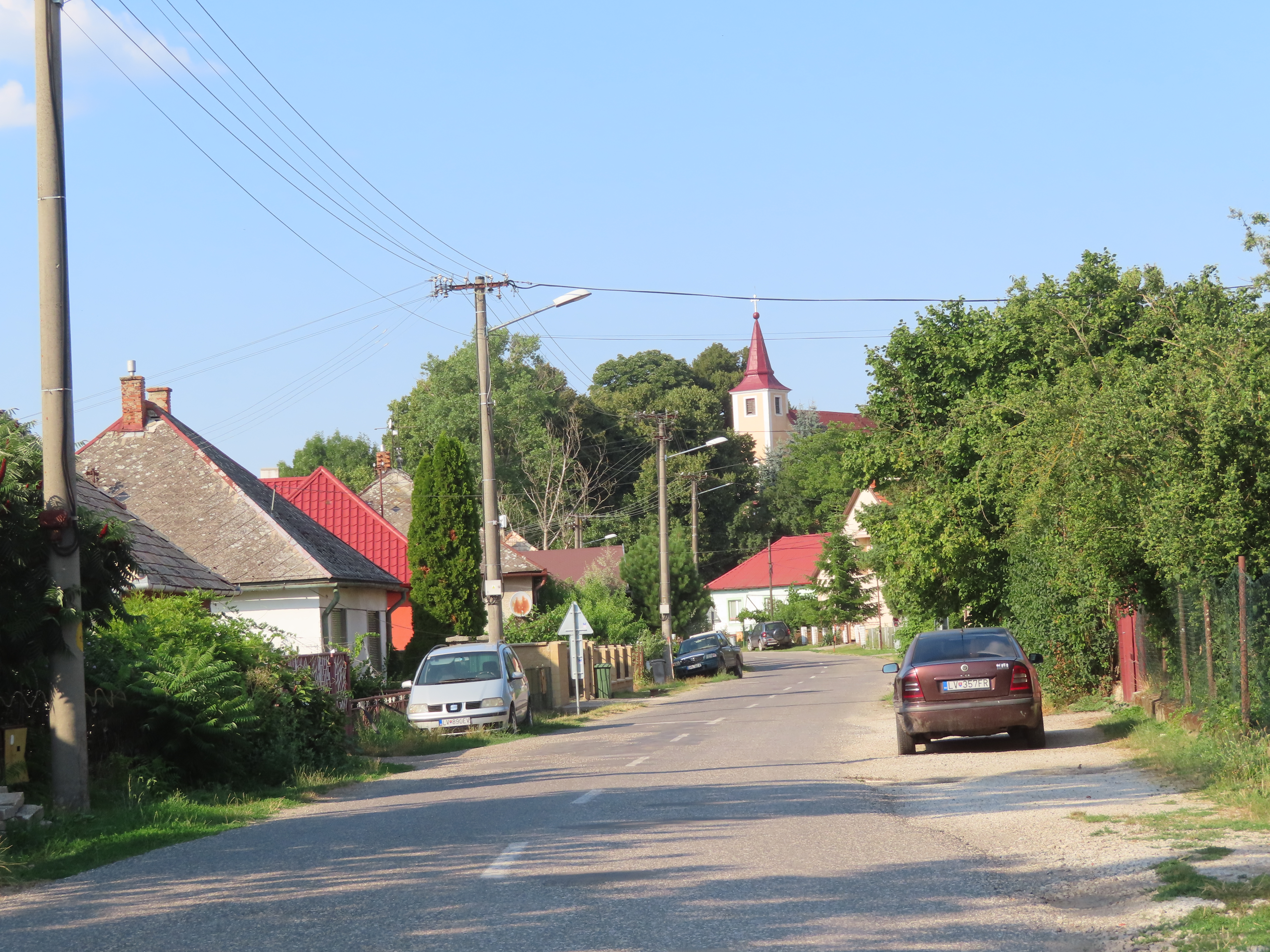

- Flag

- Location of Tupá in the Nitra Region Location of Tupá in Slovakia
- Coordinates: 48.12°N 18.90°E
- Country: Slovakia
- Region: Nitra Region
- District: Levice District
- First mentioned: 1332

Area
  - Total: 11.97 km^{2} (4.62 sq mi)
- Elevation: 129 m (423 ft)

Population (2025)
  - Total: 546
- Time zone: UTC+1 (CET)
  - Summer (DST): UTC+2 (CEST)
- Postal code: 935 84
- Area code: +421 36
- Vehicle registration plate (until 2022): LV
- Website: www.tupa.dcom.sk

Tupá (Hungarian: Kistompa or Tompa) is a village and municipality in the Levice District in the Nitra Region of Slovakia.

== History ==
In historical records the village was first mentioned in 1332.

== Geography ==
The municipality lies at an altitude of 129 metres (423 ft) and covers an area of 11.97 km^{2} (4.62 sq mi) (2025).

== Population ==
Population statistic (10 years)
Year	1995	2005	2015	2025
Count	621	618	608	546
Difference		−0.48%	−1.61%	−10.19%

Population statistic
Year	2024	2025
Count	554	546
Difference		−1.44%

It has a population of 546 people (31 December 2025).

=== Ethnicity ===
Census 2021 (1+ %)
Ethnicity	Number	Fraction
Slovak	420	73.94%
Hungarian	158	27.81%
Not found out	15	2.64%
Total	568	

In year 2021 was 568 people by ethnicity 420 as Slovak, 158 as Hungarian, 15 as Not found out, 1 as Czech, 1 as Irish, 1 as Vietnamese and 1 as Russian.

Note on population: The difference values of population numbers in the table "Population statistic" and in the sections "Ethnicity" & "Religion" is caused by the use of various statistical methods.

=== Religion ===
Census 2021 (1+ %)
Religion	Number	Fraction
Roman Catholic Church	445	78.35%
None	82	14.44%
Evangelical Church	16	2.82%
Not found out	14	2.46%
Total	568	

In year 2021 was 568 people by religion 445 from Roman Catholic Church, 82 from None, 16 from Evangelical Church, 14 from Not found out, 3 from Ad hoc movements, 2 from Greek Catholic Church, 2 from Buddhism, 1 from Calvinist Church, 1 from Jehovah's Witnesses, 1 from Christian Congregations in Slovakia and 1 from Other.

== Facilities ==
The village has a public library and football pitch.
