= Ľubomír Dobrík =

Slovak judge (1952–2022)

Judge of the Constitutional Court of Slovakia
- In office 8 February 1997 – 28 February 2016

Personal details
- Born: 19 March 1952 Zvolen, Czechoslovakia
- Died: 8 September 2022 (aged 70) Bratislava, Slovakia
- Party: HZDS (until 1997)
- Education: Comenius University; Matej Bel University
- Occupation: Judge

Ľubomír Dobrík (19 March 1952 – 8 September 2022) was a Slovak judge. Previously a member of the People's Party – Movement for a Democratic Slovakia, he served on the Constitutional Court of Slovakia from 1997 to 2016.

== Early life and education ==
Ľubomír Dobrík was born in 1952 in Zvolen, Czechoslovakia. He graduated from the Faculty of Law of Comenius University in Bratislava in 1975. Between 1992 and 1993, he completed postgraduate studies in regional and municipal financing at the Faculty of Economics of Matej Bel University in Banská Bystrica. In March 2011, he defended his doctoral dissertation at the Faculty of Law of the Pan-European University in Bratislava on the history of constitutional justice in Slovakia.

Throughout his career, Dobrík undertook several study visits abroad, including programmes in the Netherlands and Germany, focusing on judicial independence and legal transformation processes. He also participated in numerous academic conferences and published professional articles, including in Justičná revue. He co-authored the textbook Ústavné súdnictvo Slovenskej republiky, approved for use at the Faculty of Law of Matej Bel University.

== Legal and public service career ==
After graduating, Dobrík began his professional career at the District Prosecutor’s Office in Prievidza, first as a law clerk (1975–1977) and subsequently as a prosecutor until 1987. He later served as a prosecutor at the Regional Prosecutor’s Office in Banská Bystrica. Between 1991 and 1994, he held the position of Deputy Head of the District Office in Prievidza.

In 1994 he became State Secretary at the Ministry of Justice of the Slovak Republic, serving in that role until 1997. During this period, he attracted media attention in connection with administrative decisions within the judiciary. Prior to his appointment to the Constitutional Court, he also briefly served as a judge of the District Court in Prievidza. Contemporary reporting noted that he was a member of the Movement for a Democratic Slovakia (HZDS).

== Constitutional Court ==
On 1 March 1997, Dobrík was appointed as a judge of the Constitutional Court of the Slovak Republic. His nomination followed parliamentary selection procedures in early 1997. He was reappointed on 29 February 2004 and served on the Court until 29 February 2016. During his tenure, he participated in decision-making in both the Senate and the Court's plenary sessions.

== Later activities ==
After leaving the Constitutional Court, Dobrík was involved in private legal practice. He was registered as a partner and managing director of Dobrík & Partners s.r.o., a legal services company established in 2018 and later dissolved in 2021 following voluntary liquidation.

== Death ==
Dobrík died in Bratislava on 8 September 2022, at the age of 70.
