= Ján Solovič =

Slovak writer, playwright, and politician (1934–2022)

Member of the Slovak National Council
- In office 1971–1990

Personal details
- Born: 8 March 1934 Pliešovce, Czechoslovakia
- Died: 10 July 2022 (aged 88) Vysoké Tatry, Slovakia
- Education: Academy of Performing Arts in Bratislava
- Occupation: Writer; Playwright

Ján Solovič (8 March 1934 – 10 July 2022) was a Slovak writer, playwright, and politician. He served on the Slovak National Council from 1971 to 1990.

Solovič died in Vysoké Tatry on 10 July 2022 at the age of 88.
