= Kleňany =

Kleňany Kelenye
- Municipality
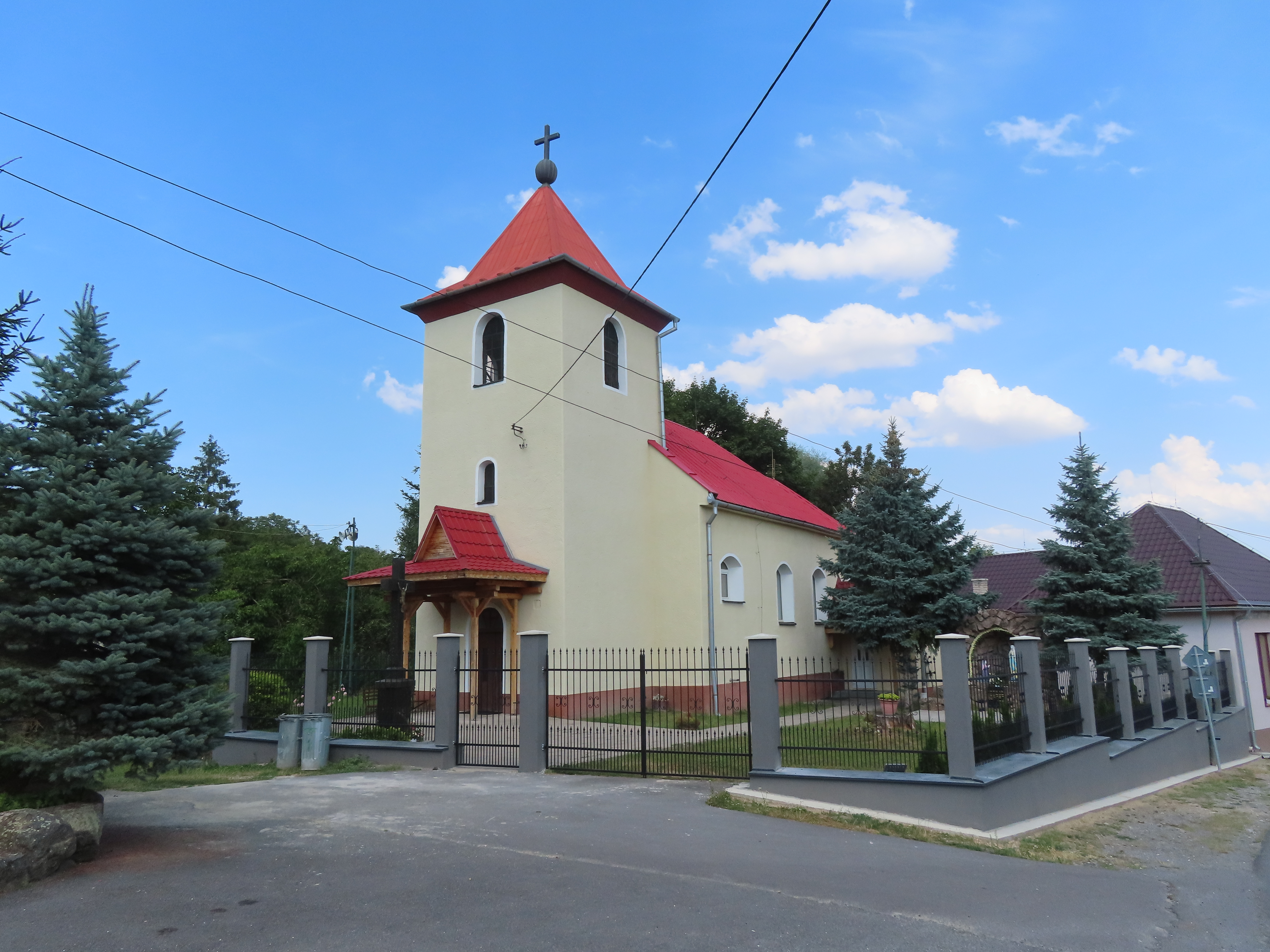

- Flag

- Location of Kleňany in the Banská Bystrica Region Location of Kleňany in Slovakia
- Coordinates: 48.12°N 19.07°E
- Country: Slovakia
- Region: Banská Bystrica Region
- District: Veľký Krtíš District
- First mentioned: 1235

Area
  - Total: 7.22 km^{2} (2.79 sq mi)
- Elevation: 216 m (709 ft)

Population (2025)
  - Total: 259
- Time zone: UTC+1 (CET)
  - Summer (DST): UTC+2 (CEST)
- Postal code: 991 10
- Area code: +421 47
- Vehicle registration plate (until 2022): VK
- Website: www.obecklenany.sk

Kleňany (Hungarian: Kelenye) is a village and municipality in the Veľký Krtíš District of the Banská Bystrica Region of southern Slovakia.

== Geography ==
The municipality lies at an altitude of 216 metres (709 ft) and covers an area of 7.22 km^{2} (2.79 sq mi) (2025).

== Population ==
Population statistic (10 years)
Year	1995	2005	2015	2025
Count	398	319	275	259
Difference		−19.84%	−13.79%	−5.81%

Population statistic
Year	2024	2025
Count	262	259
Difference		−1.14%

It has a population of 259 people (31 December 2025).

=== Ethnicity ===
Census 2021 (1+ %)
Ethnicity	Number	Fraction
Hungarian	239	85.97%
Slovak	50	17.98%
Not found out	8	2.87%
Total	278	

In year 2021 was 278 people by ethnicity 239 as Hungarian, 50 as Slovak, 8 as Not found out, 2 as Polish and 1 as Russian.

Note on population: The difference values of population numbers in the table "Population statistic" and in the sections "Ethnicity" & "Religion" is caused by the use of various statistical methods.

=== Religion ===
Census 2021 (1+ %)
Religion	Number	Fraction
Roman Catholic Church	184	66.19%
Christian Congregations in Slovakia	64	23.02%
None	23	8.27%
Not found out	5	1.8%
Total	278	

In year 2021 was 278 people by religion 184 from Roman Catholic Church, 64 from Christian Congregations in Slovakia, 23 from None, 5 from Not found out and 2 from Greek Catholic Church.

== Genealogical resources ==
The records for genealogical research are available at the state archive "Statny Archiv in Banska Bystrica, Slovakia"

- Roman Catholic church records (births/marriages/deaths): 1788-1894 (parish B)
- Lutheran church records (births/marriages/deaths): 1721-1862 (parish B)

== See also ==
- List of municipalities and towns in Slovakia
