= Ladislav Švihran =

Slovak writer and translator (1931–2022)

- Born: 15 December 1931; Liège, Belgium
- Died: 22 September 2022 (aged 90)
- Occupation: Writer
- Writing career
- Notable awards: Prize of Egon Erwin Kisch

Ladislav Švihran (15 December 1931 – 22 September 2022) was a Belgian-born Slovak writer and translator. He debuted in the year 1970 with his book Kulturizmus ducha (Culturism of the spirit) and was a professional writer between 1973 and his death.

Ladislav Švihran received the international Prize of Egon Erwin Kisch for his book Vzácne návštevy Bratislavy (Rare visits to Bratislava).

== Biography ==
Ladislav Švihran was born on 15 December 1931 in Liège, Belgium, where he lived for the first seven years of his life. Later, he studied pedagogy and psychology at Pedagogical faculty of the Comenius University in Bratislava.

== Work ==
- Kulturizmus ducha (1970)
- Tichý chlapec z Illinoisu (1971)
- Rozmarná zemeguľa (1973)
- Kým prišli mušketieri (1974)
- Nenápadní spoločníci (1976)
- Slávni vynálezcovia (1977)
- Tu sa usadíme (spoluautor s Michalom Borgulom, 1979)
- Náš priateľ Jules (1983)
- Svet stavia (1984)
- Výpravy do budúcnosti (1986)
- Naj, naj, naj... (1988)
- Aféry po novembri (spoluautor, 1990)
- Ako sme kradli (spoluautor, 1991)
- Ako zomierajú diktátori (1994)
- Knihy na dračku (1995)
- 1000 plus 1 slovenských naj (1996)
- Ján Jesenius (1996)
- Kto nám vládol (1999)
- Pavol Dobšinský (2001)
- Hviezdne okamihy (2001)
- Majstri ducha (spoluautor s Ondrejom Pössom, 2002)
- Vzácne návštevy Bratislavy (spoluautor s Ivanom Szabóom, 2005)

== Monographies and studies ==
Life and work of Ladislav Švihran is the subject of the following monographies, studies and scientific papers:

- SLIACKY, O.: Dictionary of Slovak writers for children and young adults (Slovník slovenských spisovateľov pre deti a mládež), Bratislava 2005.
- SLIACKY, O.: Pavol Dobšinský. In: Bibiana, 9, 2002, no. 2, page 62 – 63.
- BODACZ, B.: Attractiveness of information (Prítažlivost informácie). In: Literárny týždenník, 11, 1998, no. 49, page 7.
- GLOCKO, P. jr.: Vampires of modern history (Upíry novodobých dejín). In: Knižná revue, no. 5, 1995, no. 7, page 5.

== Awards ==
- 2005 – Prize of Egon Erwin Kisch

== See also ==
- Slovak literature
