= Ondrej Rigo =

Slovak serial killer (1955–2022)

- Rigo in court in Bratislava, Slovakia
- Born: Ondrej Rigo; 17 December 1955; Modra, Czechoslovakia
- Died: 14 June 2022 (aged 66); Trenčín, Slovakia
- Other names: The International killer The Sock killer
- Children: 1
- Conviction: Murder (9 counts)
- Penalty: Life imprisonment (served in Leopoldov, Slovakia)

Details
- Victims: 9 killed, 1 wounded
- Span of crimes: 7 June 1990 – 4 March 1992
- Country: Czechoslovakia, West Germany, Netherlands
- Date apprehended: March 1992; 34 years ago

Ondrej Rigo (17 December 1955 – 14 June 2022) was a Slovak serial killer and necrophile who targeted women in Bratislava, Munich and Amsterdam from 1990 to 1992. He served a life sentence until his death for nine murders and one attempted murder in Leopoldov Prison in Slovakia. Rigo was diagnosed with a schizoid personality disorder and an antisocial personality disorder as well as necrophilia, finding pleasure in having intercourse with women with mutilated heads. Rigo remains the Slovak murderer with the highest number of victims and he is also the most prolific serial killer in modern Slovak history. Rigo died on 14 June 2022, aged 66, at the Trenčín prison hospital.

== Early life ==
Rigo was born on 17 December 1955 in Modra, then part of Czechoslovakia. When he was 14, he and his siblings were placed into a youth corrective institution and later into an orphanage for a period of one year, having been taken from their mother after their father's arrest. Rigo's mother died in 2000 after being hit by a car. Learning of her death is the only time Rigo recalls ever crying in his life. His father died during a burglary. Rigo claimed he got along well with both his parents:

(My) parents were good, they didn't beat me.

— Ondrej Rigo, recalling his childhood in 2007

Rigo was twice married. His first marriage was during his military service (compulsory in Czechoslovakia at the time), but "when we returned to Bratislava she started to become jealous—‌you know, an Easterner [i.e., Eastern Slovakia, a culturally and linguistically distinct region of the country]—‌so she returned to Poprad. I went with her to say goodbye at the station," recalls Rigo. Little is known about his second marriage; the woman he was at the cinema with on the night of his last murder was referred to in the media as his "partner".

=== Legal occupation ===
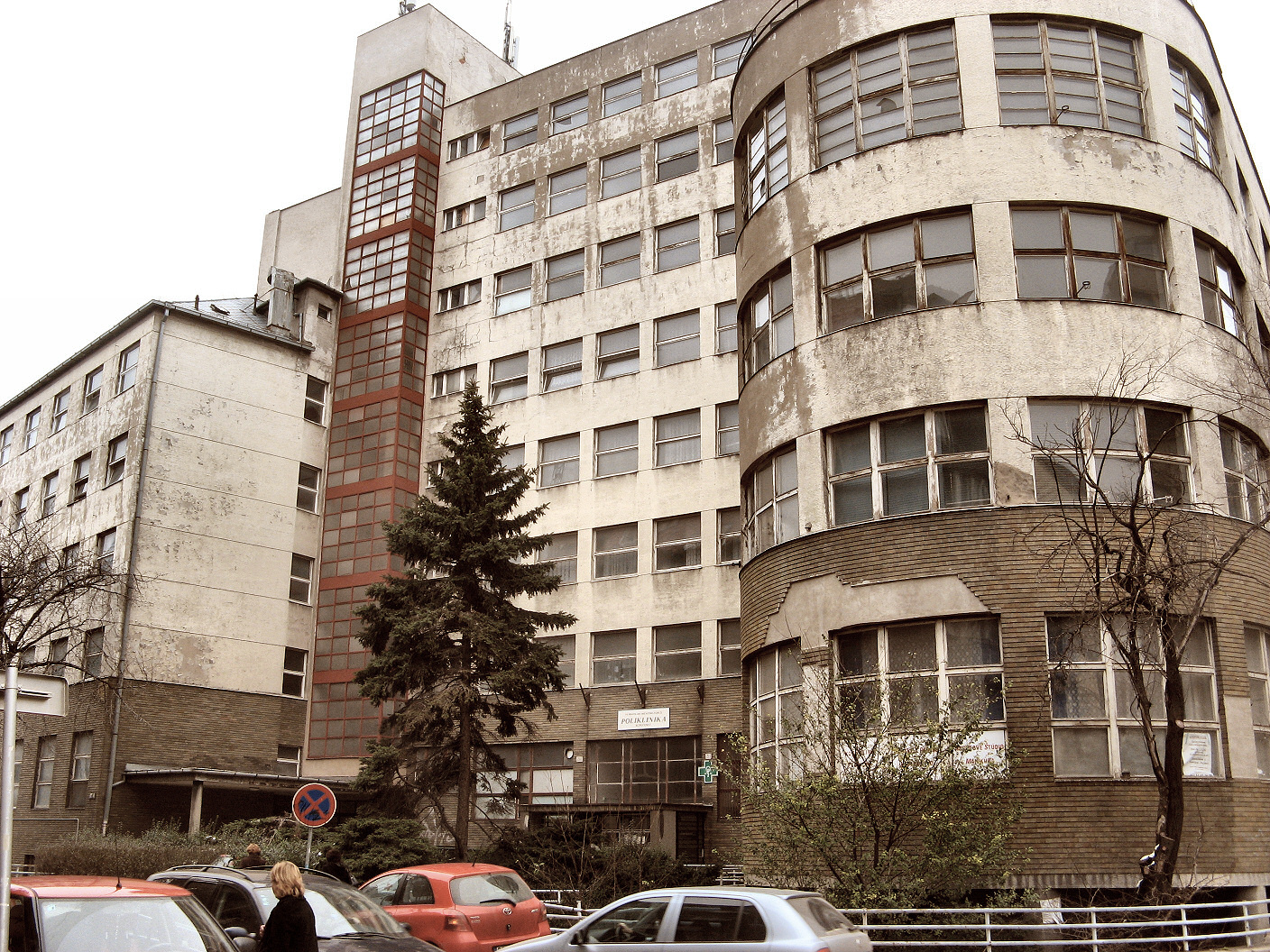
Ondrej Rigo worked in the mech.services area of this hospital on Bezručova Street, in Bratislava

In Bratislava, Rigo worked at the Hotel Carlton, where he was arrested. Before that, he worked as a fireman in the mech.services area at the Pravda newspaper, as well as at a hospital on Bezručova Street and another one on Šulekova Street, having also completed his gasman certification (plynárske skúšky in Slovak).

=== Criminal career ===
Before committing his first murder, Rigo had already been convicted of crimes 11 times. He was a criminal from an early age, focusing mainly on home burglaries. The last time period he was in police custody in Czechoslovakia was from 28 September 1989 to 9 December 1989, because of unauthorised leaving of the Republic, which was illegal under communist rule.

After the fall of the Iron Curtain and the end of communism in Czechoslovakia, people were allowed once again to travel freely in Europe; Rigo then continued with his crimes abroad. On 9 December 1989, the same day he was released from prison (and three weeks after the start of the Velvet Revolution), he travelled to Vienna without any valid passport. There, he acquired a fake Yugoslavian passport in the name of "Nedo Ikic". Later, he travelled to West Germany to meet his brother. In Bavaria, he asked for asylum, using his fake passport. He was, however, sentenced by the German authorities to two months in prison for forging documents. He spent his sentence in prison in Bad Reichenhall. After his release from prison, Rigo escaped from a refugee camp and travelled to Munich, where he continued his burglaries and started his killing spree.

== Modus operandi ==
An important factor in Ondrej Rigo's conviction was his consistent modus operandi:

- His attacks occurred during the night or very early in the morning
- He wore his socks on his hands at all times during the attacks in order not to leave any fingerprints
- He would sneak into apartments in the basements, on the ground floor or with easy access via the balcony, usually entering through a window
- He would always pick women sleeping alone (except in the case of Anna P. and her son Juraj N.) and beat them to death with a metal rod, wooden stick or a rock, always hitting the head
- The murder weapon is always left at the crime scene
- After killing the victim he would cover the victim's upper body with a blanket. Then he would copulate with the body both vaginally and anally. Sometimes, he would mutilate the body some more during intercourse
- He smoked at the crime scenes and threw cigarette butts on the floor
- Usually, he robbed the victims of some easy-to-carry valuables

== Murders ==
Victim	Age	Date
Munich, West Germany
Helena S.	40	8 June 1990
llke Z.	28	1 August 1990
Amsterdam, Netherlands
Maria van der W.	58	27 September 1990
Bratislava, Czechoslovakia
Terézia Reveszová	88	6 October 1990
Anna Páleníková	40	3 January 1991
Juraj Nitriansky	14–16	3 January 1991
Jana Bartošíková	31	9 January 1991
Helena Nováková	79	25 April 1991
Henrieta Odlerová	22	14 July 1991
Matilda Urbanová	67	4 March 1992

After arriving in Munich, Rigo murdered twice in three months. His first victim, Helena S. (40), probably surprised Rigo while he was burglarizing her apartment. "He killed her and got aroused sexually," recalled Anton Heretik, author of Rigo's psychological evaluation during the investigation. On the night of 7–8 June 1990, he sneaked through a partially open window into the ground floor bedroom of Helena S. at an unspecified location in Munich. Rigo smashed her head with a 2.5-kilogram (5.5 lb) metal pipe, wrapped the upper part of her body in a blanket, and raped her corpse. Before leaving, he may have stolen some easily portable valuables. He disposed of the murder weapon directly beneath the bedroom window.

On the night of 31 July– 1 August 1990, Rigo snuck through the partially open balcony door and into the Munich apartment of Ilka Z. (27), murdering her, again using a metal pipe. Rigo also stabbed her in the neck with a screwdriver, most likely during the act of copulation. He performed both vaginal and anal intercourse with her body. Afterwards, he covered up the body and searched the house for valuables, finding a golden necklace and an unknown amount of German marks, which he stole. The murder weapon and a man's sock were later found by the German police at the crime scene.

In October, Rigo left Munich for Amsterdam to visit his sister, Helena. Maria van der W (58) was a woman living alone in Amsterdam. During the night of 27 September 1990, Rigo snuck into her ground-floor apartment through a partially open balcony window and killed her with a stone, possibly a pavement cobblestone, weighing over 5.5 kilograms (about 12 lb). He stripped the body naked and copulated with it. Again he robbed his victim, stealing a camera, a woman's wristwatch, two boxes containing coins, and some other valuables. In the kitchen, he found a bottle of slivovica and drank it. Later, in court, a witness would testify that Rigo had a liking for this particular drink.

Rigo left for Bratislava, Slovakia the day following the murder. His killings continued with the murder of Terézia R. (88) inside a retirement home in Bratislava, on 6 October 1990. He bludgeoned her with his fist while she was sleeping. The retirement home reported prayer books, a rosary and 4,000 Kčs as missing. Underneath the balcony, the police found some Dutch coins and cigarette butts with Rigo's DNA on them.

Terézia R., 88, Rigo's oldest victim

On 3 January 1991, in the early morning, the bodies of Anna P. (40) and her son Juraj N. (aged 14–16) were found inside a ground-floor flat in a dormitory at an unspecified location in Bratislava. Rigo entered the apartment through a window around midnight. The son was sleeping beside his mother when Rigo crushed their heads with a wooden stick. Anna P. tried to protect her son. Afterwards, Rigo copulated with her body. Anna P., who had emigrated to Switzerland in 1982 with her son and husband, was in Bratislava with her son for only a few days for the New Year's celebrations.

Jana B. (31) became the first person to survive Rigo's attack on 9 January 1991, when she managed to fight him off after being attacked in her first-floor Bratislava apartment on Kutuzovova Street. Rigo gained access through a ventilation window above the door. After the unsuccessful attack, he quickly fled the apartment. Jana B. noticed that Rigo's light-blue pants were hand-sewn in the crotch area, which later helped in identifying him—‌the police would indeed find the pants in question in his closet. That same night, before attacking Jana B., Rigo entered through a different window in the neighbourhood, but it led only to a small, locked storage room.

Three months after his last kill and after the attack on Jana B., he murdered Helena N. (79) near Záhradnícka Street in Bratislava. This was very near his previous murder scene, possibly on the same street. Rigo removed a net from the kitchen window of this ground-floor apartment, killing Helena N. with a piece of concrete.

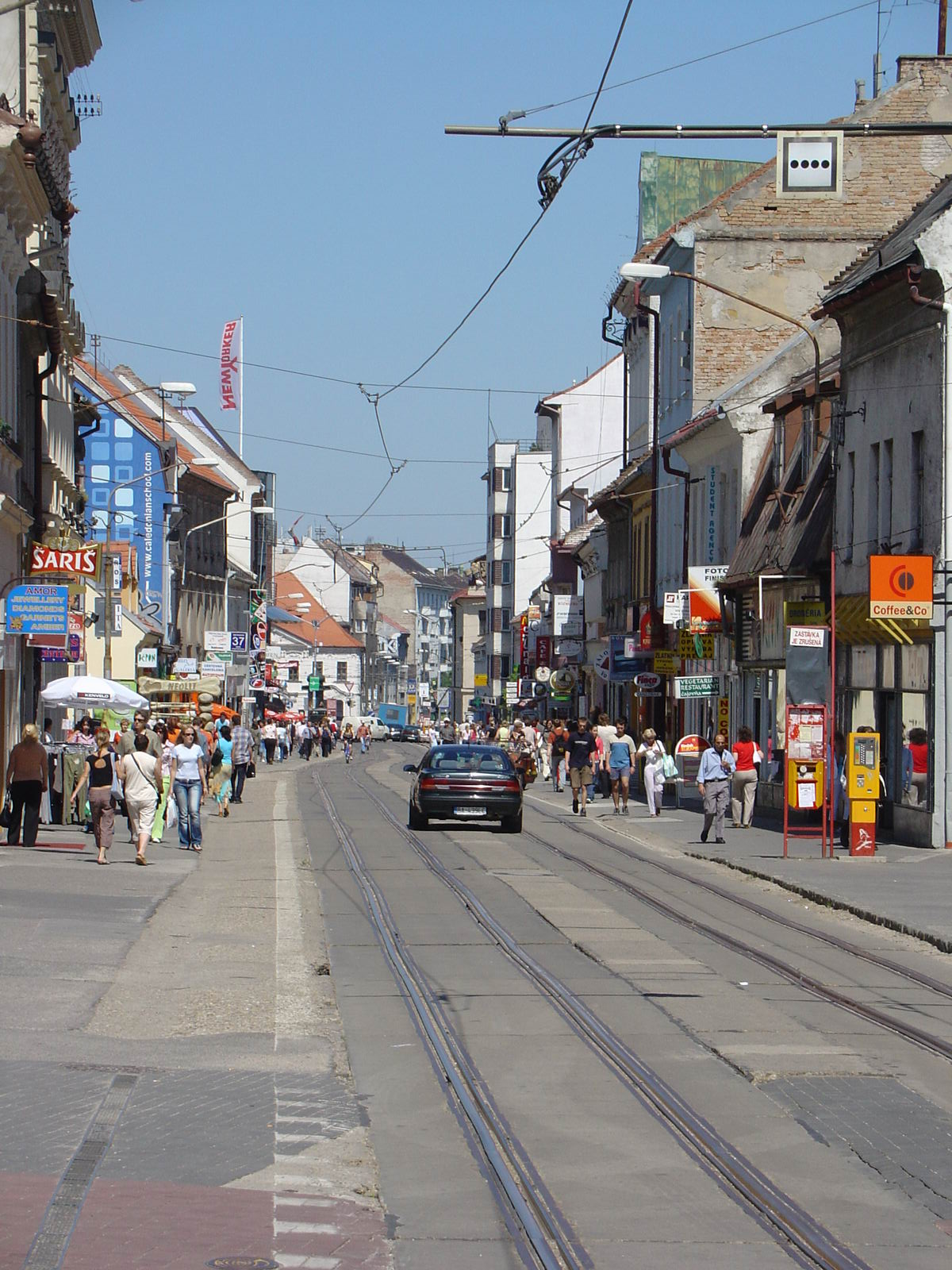
Obchodná street in Bratislava, 13 years after the murder

Henrieta O. (22) was attacked on 14 July 1991. Rigo gained access to her Bratislava apartment through the window, which she probably left open because of the heat. She was playing her guitar late into the night. Rigo smashed her head in, raped her, and robbed her, leaving her for dead. Henrieta O. initially survived the attack, but died 18 days later. Henrieta O.'s grandmother was sleeping in another room of the apartment at the time of Rigo's attack—‌as she was nearly deaf, she could not hear Rigo attacking her fatally injured granddaughter.

Rigo's final victim, Matilda U. (67), was murdered on 4 March 1992, in the centre of Bratislava in a porch house on Obchodná Street. That night, Rigo was in the cinema "Dukla" (currently a YMCA), on Šancová Street with his girlfriend. They were returning home together when he suddenly told her that he had to take care of something and got off the trolleybus. He did not come home until the following morning.

Another unnamed victim from Bratislava, killed with a knife, has been inconclusively attributed to Rigo. The victim was a woman found the morning after her murder by her son. The murder is considered unsolved as of 2008.

Rigo gave some of the items he stole from his victims to his daughter.

== Arrest and sentencing ==
=== Arrest ===
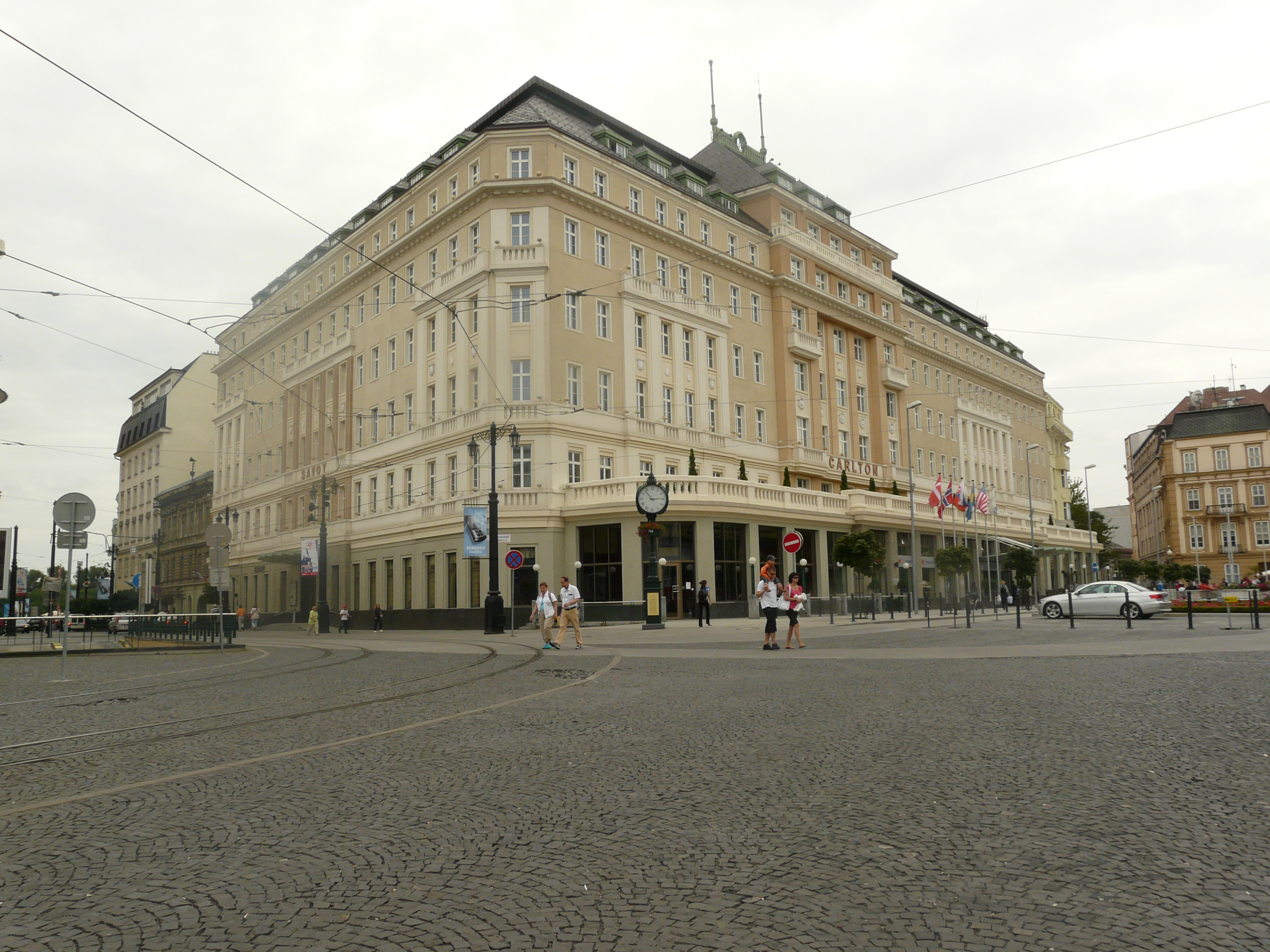
The place of Rigo's arrest - Hotel Carlton, Hviezdoslavovo Square in Bratislava, Slovakia.

He was still in trance, like a snake who just swallowed its prey. There were traces of blood on his shoes and trousers and inside his locker there were jewels belonging to the victim.

— Former investigator JUDr. Jozef Vachálek, recalling Rigo's arrest

Ondrej Rigo was arrested by the Slovak criminal police on 4 March 1992, only hours after his last murder. He was arrested in Hotel Carlton on Hviezdoslavovo Square in Bratislava, where he was employed as a cloakroom attendant. At the time of his arrest, he was still without his socks, which he had used in the attack.

Later, he would claim that the blood on him was syrup and that his sperm found on the victim was arranged by a prostitute from an erotic club. He explained his footprints beneath the balconies and cigarette butts by claiming he was there by chance and had to urinate or that he was curious and took a look through some windows. He explained his possession of jewellery by saying that women often gave him gifts.

Jana B., the only survivor of his crimes, clearly saw Rigo's face, as the streetlight outside illuminated Rigo's face inside the apartment where she fought with him. She would later attend his trial wearing a wig, to remain unnoticed by him. The criminal police of Germany, the Netherlands, and Czechoslovakia had been investigating each of Rigo's murders separately—‌it was only after his arrest that they began cooperating.

=== Trial ===
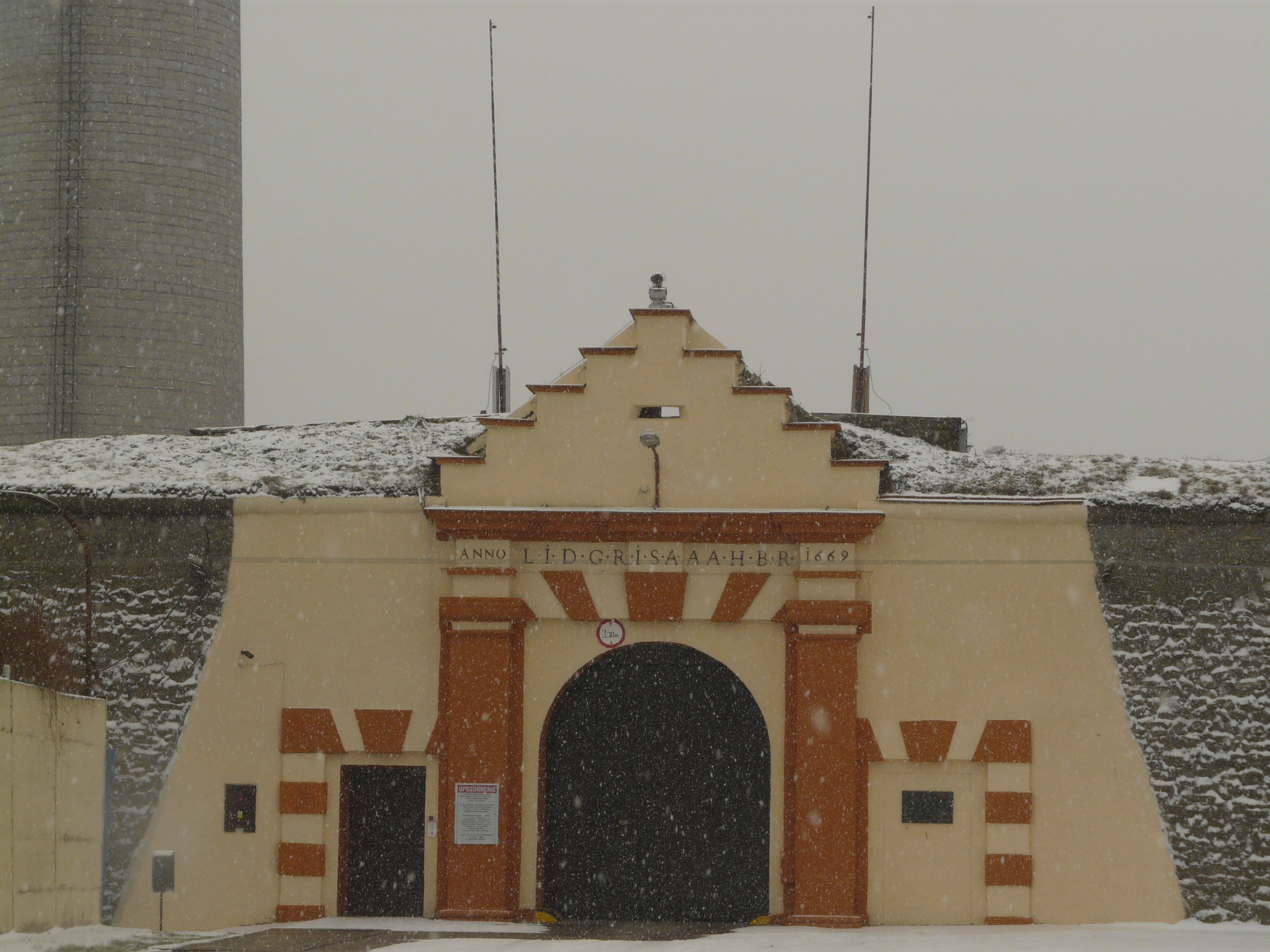
Main entrance of the prison where Rigo was serving his life sentence in Leopoldov, Slovakia

Ondrej Rigo was sentenced on 7 December 1994 by the City Court of Bratislava after a trial that lasted ten days. A senate headed by Peter Šamko sentenced him to life imprisonment in the "third class", which means highest security prison in Slovakia. When details of his crimes were read to him in court, Rigo did not react in any way. He was sitting rigidly and leaning a bit forward with his face showing no emotion throughout the trial. His file consisted of 5500 pages.

As explained by Šamko, the sentence was chosen based on directly or indirectly proven nine murders, the especially brutal way in which he committed the murders, as well as the fact that possibilities of his resocialization are quite limited and the prognosis is poor. There was also DNA evidence presented to the court consisting of blood analysis and analysis of semen from the victims, as well as testimonies of 194 witnesses (including witnesses from Germany and the Netherlands).

Rigo never pleaded guilty to any of the murders nor believed he was guilty.

Rigo appealed the first-order court's sentence. In his appeal, he claimed innocence, without giving any kind of proof.

Rigo's appeal process at the Supreme Court of Slovakia started on 27 February 1996. During his finishing speech, the representative of the General Prosecutor's Office of Slovakia, Ivan Segeš, proposed to confirm the life imprisonment sentence because Rigo's guilt had been proven once again in the appeal process. On 28 February 1996, the senate of the Highest Court of Slovak Republic denied Rigo's appeal and confirmed his sentence. There was no other appeal possible.

After serving several years in Ilava prison, Rigo was transferred to Leopoldov Prison.

== Personality and psychopathological profile ==
According to court-appointed psychologist Anton Heretik, author of Rigo's psychological profile during the trial, Rigo is a psychopath. "He does not accept any social norms, he is lacking empathy and behaves very impulsively. At the same time he is a schizoid personality, unable to create relationships with others. He has strange thoughts and hobbies and he is a loner. He is a combination of schizoid and antisocial psychopath, creating a very dangerous type of criminal", claims Heretik.

According to his psychological profile, the strangeness, lack of hospitality and language barrier in a foreign country could have influenced his later behaviour. Rigo was found by the psychologists to not be a sadist.

According to Rigo's investigator Jozef Vachálek, "(he) had a low IQ and seldom talked".

While incarcerated in Ilava prison, Rigo behaved according to the norms most of the time, but according to pedagogist Daniel Blaško from Ilava Prison, he would "often react too aggressively". "Chances for his correction are zero", says Blaško. According to him, it was difficult to communicate with Rigo, because he seldom communicated in a coherent sentence.

Ondrej Rigo has a daughter. According to an article in the Slovak newspaper SME, Rigo was of Roma ethnicity. Even as an adult, Rigo was a man of short stature.

== Survivor ==
The Slovak artist Jana Bartošíková is the only person to survive an attack by Rigo. She had attended karate classes for several years. She was attacked around 2:30 in the morning while sleeping in her apartment on Kutuzovova Street in Bratislava's third district on 9 January 1991. She returned home an hour after midnight and went to sleep. Rigo gained access to the apartment via a ventilation window above the door. A ladder was found leaning against the façade.

"I was woken up by a hit to the head and I saw a man standing by my bed. At first I thought I'm dreaming, because I was living alone but when I received another hit to the head I woke up and the wooden shaft from a hoe Rigo stole outside, on the building's yard, broke, because it was moldy," she recalls. Jana jumped from her bed and started defending herself immediately with the broken piece of wood. When Rigo went to the door, unlocking it from inside, she threw a chair at him. In the kitchen, he wrestled her onto a hot gas oven. "The skin on my legs and stomach started to burn", she recalls. They fell on the ground wrestling, then Rigo stood up and started punching her in the head. At this moment, she grabbed him by his genitals and squeezed them. "He was just trying to gouge out my eye", she remembers. She doesn't remember whether Rigo screamed or not, but the rest of the fight before was silent. He then quickly fled the apartment while she alarmed her neighbour by banging on the wall, instructing him to call the police. Another neighbour, woken up by her son who had heard the commotion, found her in shock and savagely beaten.

The neighbour told the police he heard some weird noises but he thought she was probably framing pictures in the middle of the night. After the attack, her wounds required several weeks to heal. According to her's mother, the worst thing was that Rigo was caught over a year after the attack on her daughter, all the time knowing he might come back to finish the job. Years later, she claims she has no psychological trauma from the attack and she is not interested in Rigo.

Why should I move? Where is it safer? In Petržalka? Rigo is not interesting to me. I have no trauma from him, I don't feel anything, he doesn't mean anything to me. I don't want to talk about him, read about him or know anything about him.

— Jana B., the only survivor of Ondrej Rigo's attacks, when interviewed by Šarm in 2008

Jana Bartošíková stayed in the flat she was attacked in for a long time, not feeling the need to move. Other sources claim she got a dog and had to have a light on during the night for seven years after the attack, afterwards finally moving out from the apartment.

== In popular culture ==
- Beštia (English: The Beast), a detective novel by Slovak author Dominik Dán, published in Slovakia in July 2006 is a semi-fictionalised story of Ondrej Rigo. It details the atmosphere of the aftermath of President Václav Havel's amnesty in 1990 which released many criminals from prisons.

== See also ==
- List of people sentenced to life imprisonment in Slovakia
- Crime in Slovakia
- List of serial killers by country
