= Rykynčice =

Rykynčice Rakonca
- Municipality
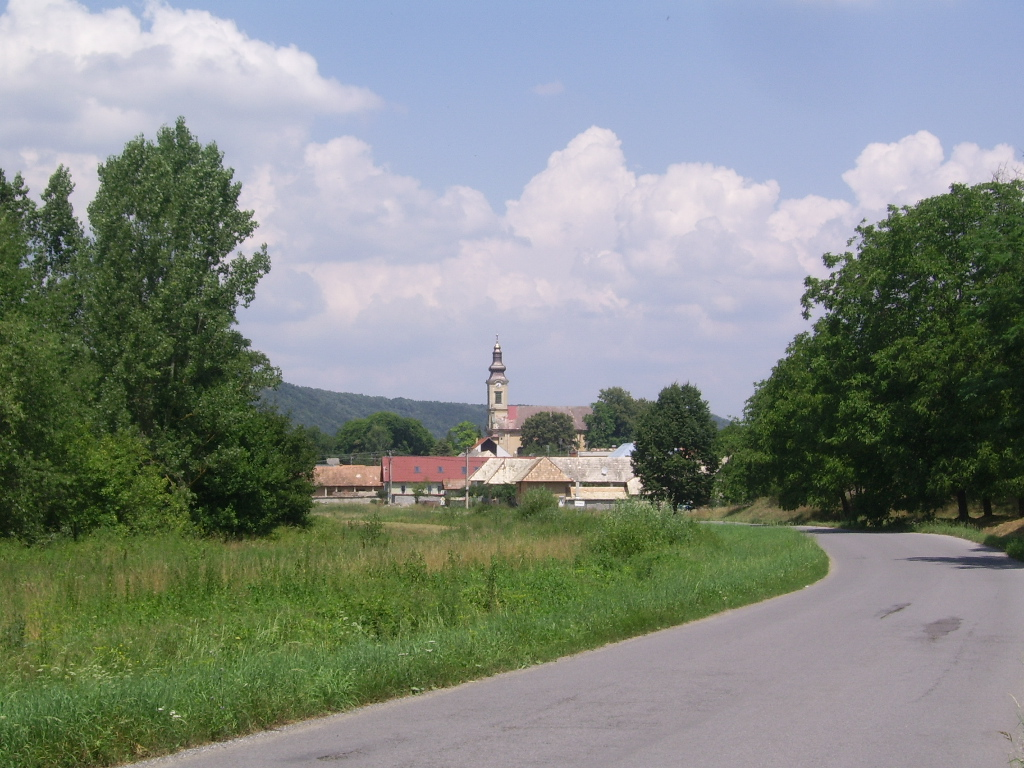

- Flag

- Location of Rykynčice in the Banská Bystrica Region Location of Rykynčice in Slovakia
- Coordinates: 48.20°N 18.97°E
- Country: Slovakia
- Region: Banská Bystrica Region
- District: Krupina District
- First mentioned: 1279

Area
  - Total: 19.17 km^{2} (7.40 sq mi)
- Elevation: 161 m (528 ft)

Population (2025)
  - Total: 259
- Time zone: UTC+1 (CET)
  - Summer (DST): UTC+2 (CEST)
- Postal code: 962 55
- Area code: +421 45
- Vehicle registration plate (until 2022): KA
- Website: www.rykyncice.sk

Rykynčice (Hungarian: Rakonca) is a municipality in central Slovakia with 270 inhabitants (December 31, 2018) which is located in Okres Krupina, a district of Banskobystrický kraj in Slovakia.

== History & Geography ==
The municipality lies at an altitude of 161 metres (528 ft) and covers an area of 19.17 km^{2} (7.40 sq mi) (2025).

The current community was created in 1964 by the cooperation of Dolné Rykynčice (Hungarian "Alsórakonca") and Horné Rykynčice (Hungarian "Felsőrakonca"). He was first mentioned as "Rakucha" in written documents and he was the former local family head of Rakonczay. Later, landlords came from the familie of Palásthy, the prior of Buda and the former sovereignty at the monastery in Bzovík (in the 16th century). In 1715, the village had a mill, vineyards and 81 households. In 1828, there were 107 houses and 644 inhabitants, whose main sources of income were agriculture, fruit growing and the production of wine. Horné Rykynčice was first mentioned in written documents as "Felsewrakaucha" in 1327. The village was owned by the Palásthy family until the 18th century, where later on the Koháry and Coburg families owned goods in the village. In 1715, the village had 22 households but later it had 58 houses and 350 inhabitants in 1828. Until 1918, the places in Hont county belonged to the Kingdom of Hungary and then came to the old Czechoslovakia (today: Slovakia).The municipality is located on the western side of the Krupinská planina highlands in the Krupinica valley. The town center is located 16 kilometers away from Šahy and 24 kilometers away from Krupina. Municipalities nearby are Medovarce in the north, Drienovo in the east, Plášťovce in the south and Hontianske Tesáre in the west.

== Population ==
Population statistic (10 years)
Year	1995	2005	2015	2025
Count	412	327	289	259
Difference		−20.63%	−11.62%	−10.38%

Population statistic
Year	2024	2025
Count	262	259
Difference		−1.14%

It has a population of 259 people (31 December 2025).

=== Ethnicity ===
Census 2021 (1+ %)
Ethnicity	Number	Fraction
Slovak	255	96.22%
Not found out	10	3.77%
Total	265	

In year 2021 was 265 people by ethnicity 255 as Slovak, 10 as Not found out, 2 as Czech, 1 as Vietnamese, 1 as Romani, 1 as German and 1 as Hungarian.

Note on population: The difference values of population numbers in the table "Population statistic" and in the sections "Ethnicity" & "Religion" is caused by the use of various statistical methods.

=== Religion ===
Census 2021 (1+ %)
Religion	Number	Fraction
Roman Catholic Church	210	79.25%
None	29	10.94%
Evangelical Church	18	6.79%
Not found out	8	3.02%
Total	265	

In year 2021 was 265 people by religion 210 from Roman Catholic Church, 29 from None, 18 from Evangelical Church and 8 from Not found out.

== Sights ==
- Roman Catholic Church "Immaculate Conception" in late baroque style from 1788 in Dolné Rykynčice.
- Evangelical church from 1764 in Horné Rykynčice.
- Arboretum Felaťa east of Dolné Rykynčice.

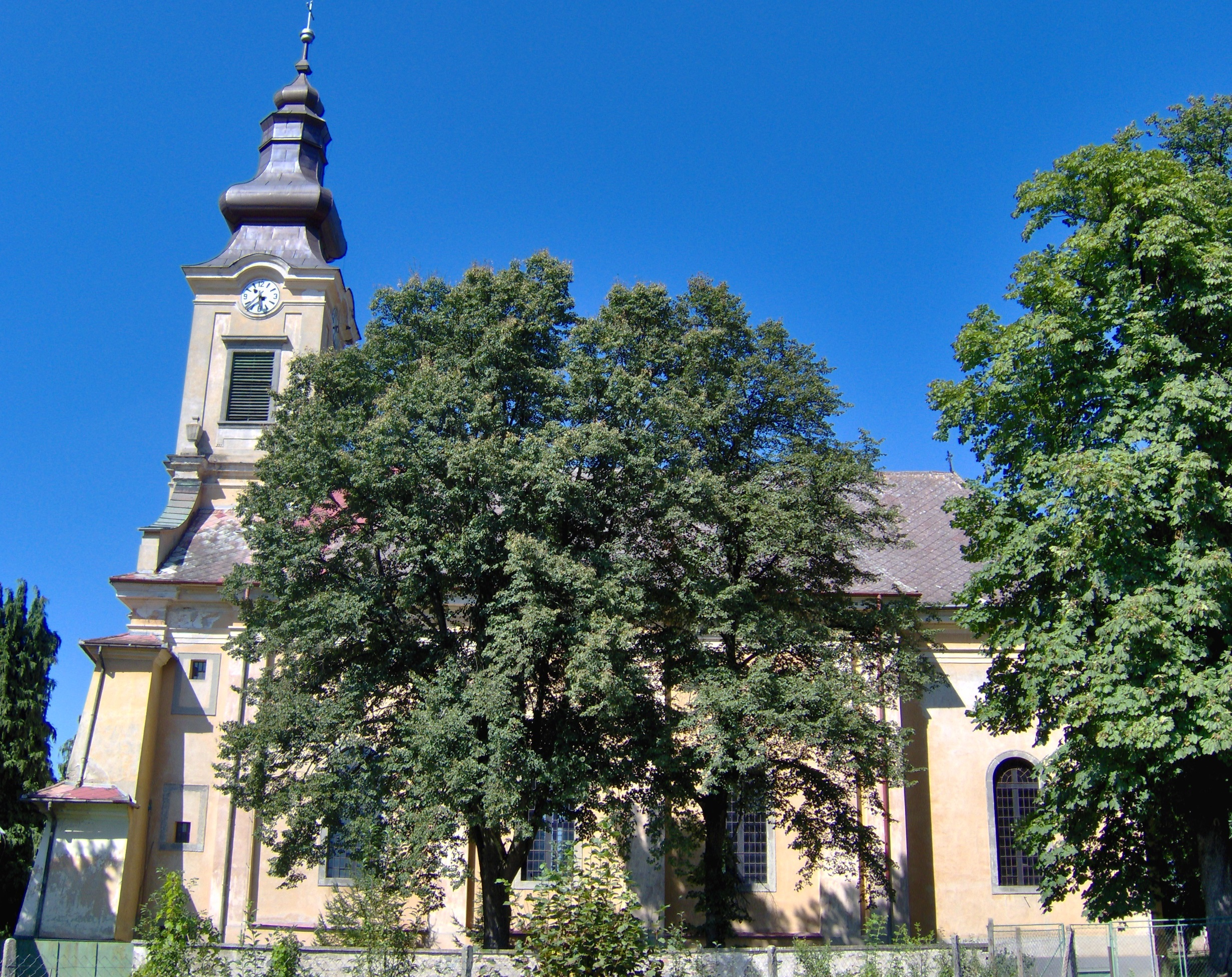
Church of the Immaculate Conception

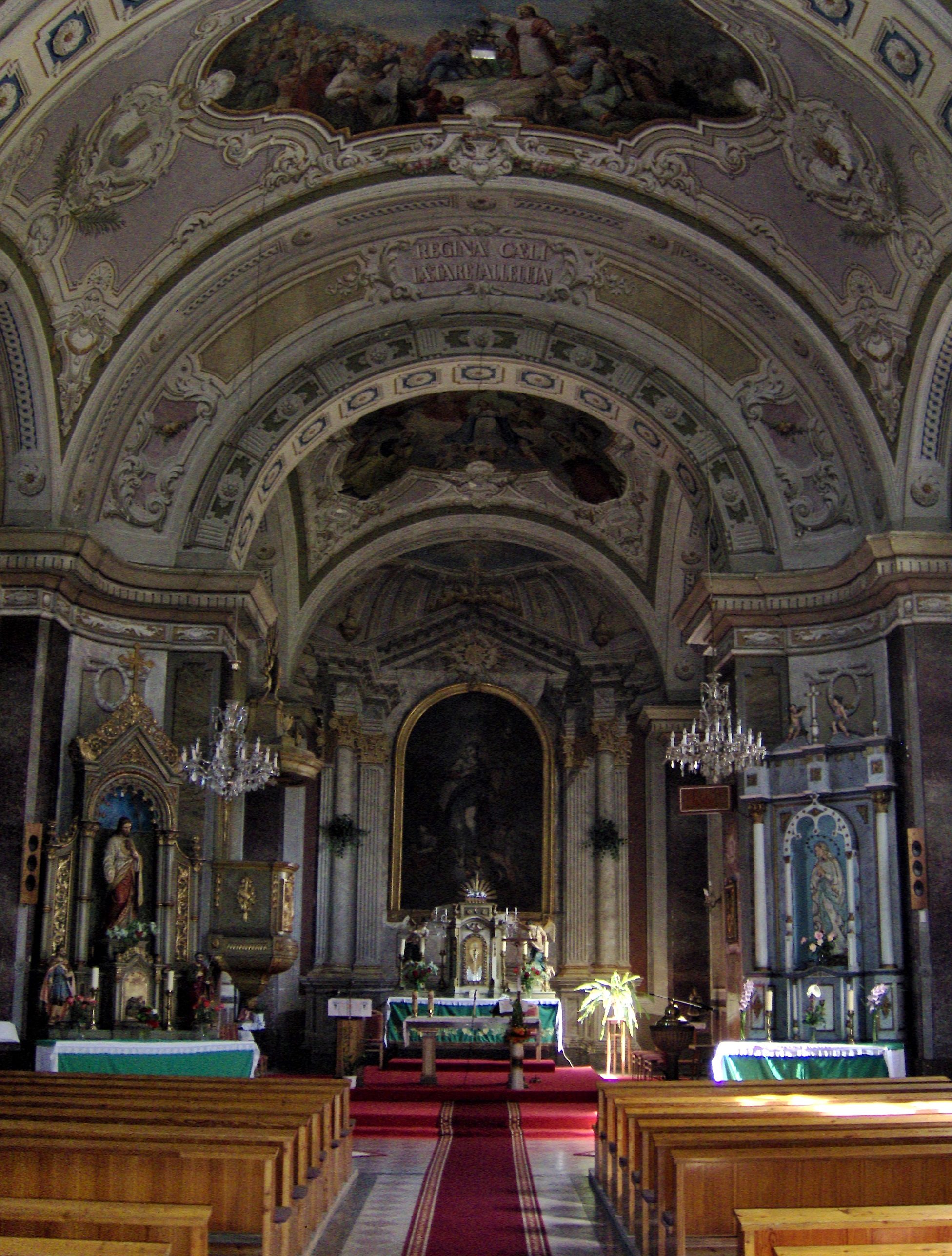
The inside of the church.

== Personalities ==
- Ján Rotarides (1822–1900), Slovak teacher and member of the Slovak national movement.
