= Badin (disambiguation) =

Badin is a city in Sindh, Pakistan.

Badin may also refer to:

== Places ==
- Badin District, a district in Sindh, Pakistan
  - Badin Taluka, an administrative division of the district
- Badin, North Carolina, a village in Carolina, US
  - Badin Historic District
- Badin Lake, a lake in the US
- Badín, a village in Slovakia
- Horný Badín, a village in Slovakia
- Dolný Badín, a village in Slovakia

== People ==
- Christian Badin (born 1949), French rugby union player
- Clément Badin (born 1995), French footballer
- Georges Badin (1927–2014), French poet and painter
- Gustav Badin (died 1822), Swedish courtservant and diarist
- Stephen Badin (1768–1853), American Catholic priest

== See also ==
- Badingham, a village in the United Kingdom
- Badinabad-e Piran, a village in Iran
- Badin Hall (University of Notre Dame), a hall of University of Notre Same, USA
