= Litava =

Litava may refer to:

- Litava, Krupina District, a municipality and village in Slovakia
- Litava, a village and part of Olší (Brno-Country District) in the Czech Republic
- Litava (river), a river in the Czech Republic
- Leitha, a river in Austria and Hungary, called Litava in Czech and Slovak
