= Devičie =

Devičie Devicse
- Municipality
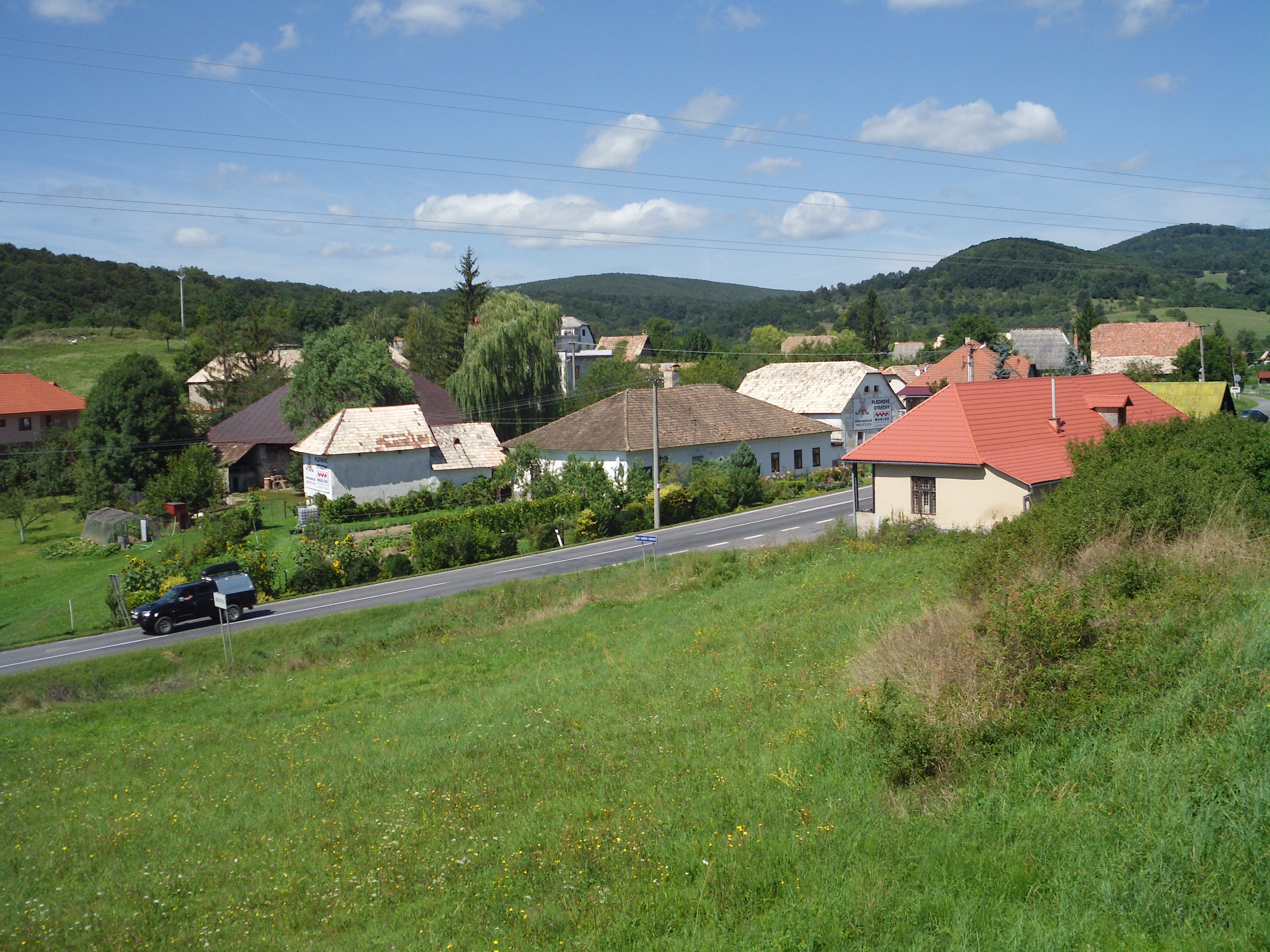

- Flag

- Location of Devičie in the Banská Bystrica Region Location of Devičie in Slovakia
- Coordinates: 48.32°N 19.03°E
- Country: Slovakia
- Region: Banská Bystrica Region
- District: Krupina District
- First mentioned: 1256

Area
  - Total: 14.06 km^{2} (5.43 sq mi)
- Elevation: 254 m (833 ft)

Population (2025)
  - Total: 294
- Time zone: UTC+1 (CET)
  - Summer (DST): UTC+2 (CEST)
- Postal code: 962 65
- Area code: +421 45
- Vehicle registration plate (until 2022): KA
- Website: devicie-obec.webnode.sk

Devičie (Hungarian: Devicse) is a village and municipality in the Krupina District of the Banská Bystrica Region of Slovakia. Mayor is Roman Lenhard.

== Geography ==
The municipality lies at an altitude of 254 metres (833 ft) and covers an area of 14.06 km^{2} (5.43 sq mi) (2025).

== History ==
Settlements from the Bronze Age and Thracian and Hallstatt finds have been made here.

In historical records, the village was first mentioned in 1256 when King Béla IV resettled persons from Devičie to Hontianske Nemce. In the 16th century it belonged to Čabraď castle (Kőváry and Terjény families).

== Population ==
Population statistic (10 years)
Year	1995	2005	2015	2025
Count	268	285	299	294
Difference		+6.34%	+4.91%	−1.67%

Population statistic
Year	2024	2025
Count	302	294
Difference		−2.64%

It has a population of 294 people (31 December 2025).

=== Ethnicity ===
Census 2021 (1+ %)
Ethnicity	Number	Fraction
Slovak	301	98.68%
Not found out	4	1.31%
Total	305	

In year 2021 was 305 people by ethnicity 301 as Slovak, 4 as Not found out, 1 as Russian and 1 as French.

Note on population: The difference values of population numbers in the table "Population statistic" and in the sections "Ethnicity" & "Religion" is caused by the use of various statistical methods.

=== Religion ===
Census 2021 (1+ %)
Religion	Number	Fraction
Evangelical Church	124	40.66%
Roman Catholic Church	121	39.67%
None	51	16.72%
Total	305	

In year 2021 was 305 people by religion 124 from Evangelical Church, 121 from Roman Catholic Church, 51 from None, 3 from Not found out, 2 from Paganism and natural spirituality, 2 from Other and not ascertained christian church, 1 from Other and 1 from Ad hoc movements.

== Genealogical resources ==
The records for genealogical research are available at the state archive "Statny Archiv in Banska Bystrica, Slovakia"

- Roman Catholic church records (births/marriages/deaths): 1828-1895 (parish B)
- Lutheran church records (births/marriages/deaths): 1786-1895 (parish A)

== See also ==
- List of municipalities and towns in Slovakia
