= Trpín =

Trpín may refer to:

- Trpín (Svitavy District), a municipality in the Pardubice Region of the Czech Republic
- Trpín, Krupina District, a municipality in the Banská Bystrica Region of Slovakia
