= Drážovce =

Dražovce or Drážovce may refer to:

- Drážovce, Krupina District, a municipality and village in Slovakia
- Dražovce church, a church in Nitra-Dražovce
