= Cerovo, Slovakia =

Cerovo Cseri
- Municipality
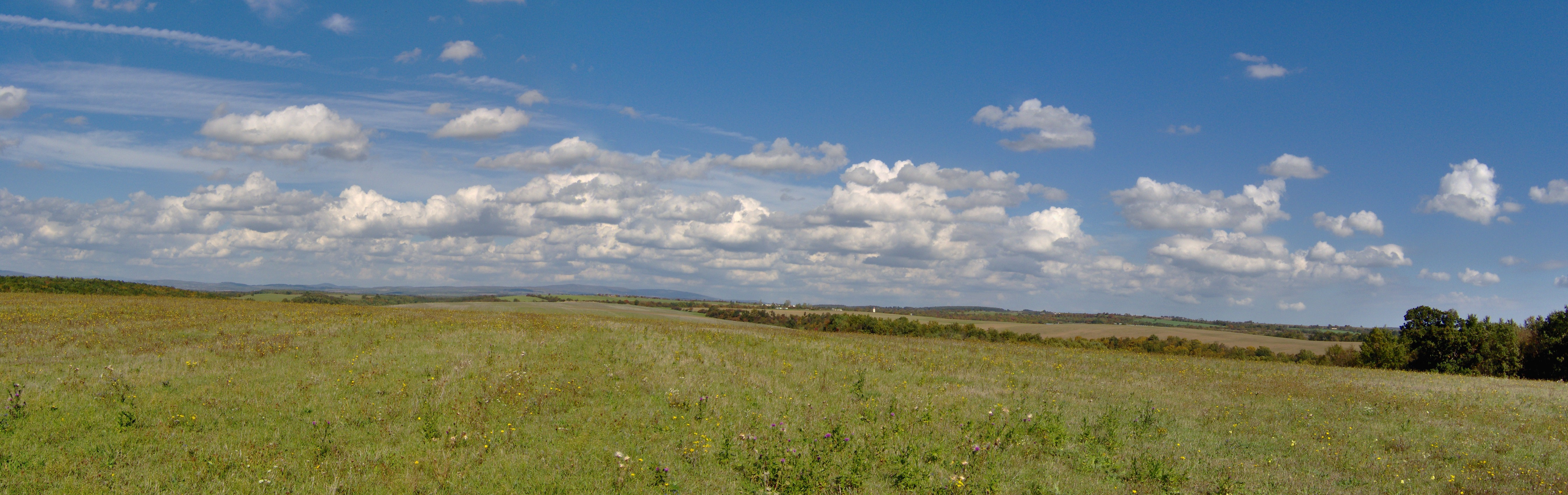

- Flag

- Location of Cerovo in the Banská Bystrica Region Location of Cerovo in Slovakia
- Coordinates: 48°15′N 19°10′E
- Country: Slovakia
- Region: Banská Bystrica Region
- District: Krupina District
- First mentioned: 1275

Area
  - Total: 30.27 km^{2} (11.69 sq mi)
- Elevation: 468 m (1,535 ft)

Population (2025)
  - Total: 547
- Time zone: UTC+1 (CET)
  - Summer (DST): UTC+2 (CEST)
- Postal code: 962 52
- Area code: +421 45
- Vehicle registration plate (until 2022): KA
- Website: www.cerovo.dcom.sk

Cerovo (earlier Čerové, Čerowo; Hungarian: Cseri) is a village and municipality in the Krupina District of the Banská Bystrica Region of Slovakia.

== Geography ==
The municipality lies at an altitude of 468 metres (1,535 ft) and covers an area of 30.27 km^{2} (11.69 sq mi) (2025).

== History ==
The village was first mentioned as Chery in a charter in 1273, its name is derived from the Old Slavic "cěrъ"/Slovak "cer"/Hungarian "cser" (the Hungarian word is derived from the Slavic one), which means Turkey oak. It had Slovak inhabitants.

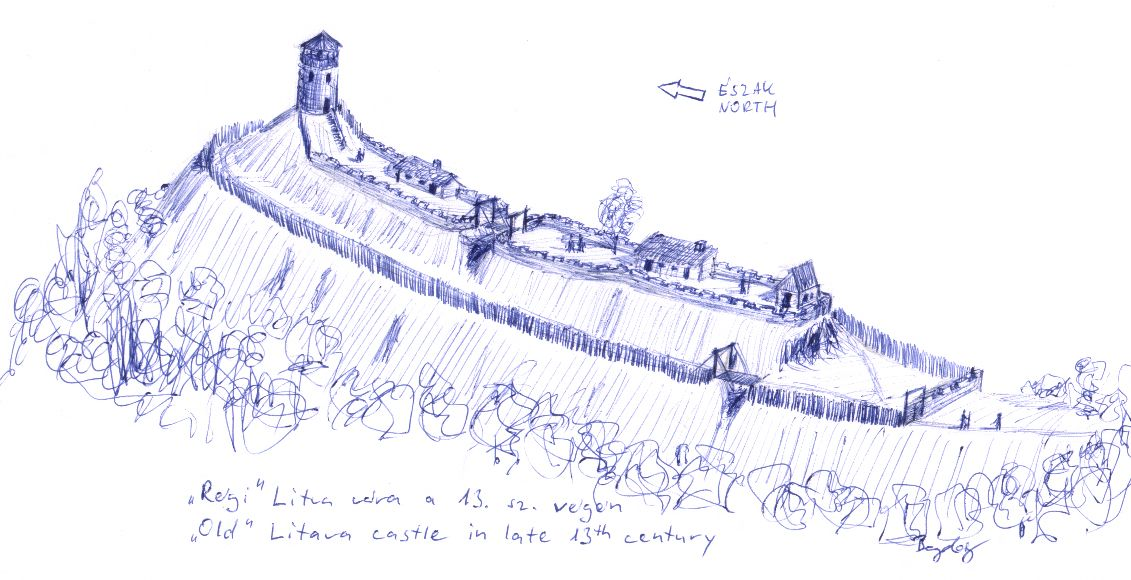
The old Litava castle in late 13th century

Scarce ruins of the old Litava castle can be found south-west of Cerovo on the northern end of the Pustý hrad mountain. The Litava Castle was built by Hunt or his son, Big Derž (Derš, Hungarian: Ders) from the Hunt-Poznan family. The castle was first mentioned in 1276. In this year the grandchildren of Lambert, of the Hunt-Poznan family, Small Derž (Ders) and Demeter captured Litava and robbed valuables of 3000 marks and charters. Therefore, the king confiscated their property and gave their property to Big Derž from the Hunt-Poznan family. Before 1307 Nicholas Túri Kövér, son of Big Derž of the Hunt-Poznan family, exchanged the castle Litava with his relatives, Derž and Demeter of Hunt. In 1318 master Tomáš, son of Derž of the Hunt-Poznan family, protested against the occupation of Litava by Matthew III Csák. The castle perished not long after, probably during struggles of the oligarchs.

But a new castle was built 3 kilometres north-west of the old Litava castle. It was called Litava too until the middle of the 15th century when the new castle would be called Čabraď (also called Litava, Haradnuk, Haradnok, Chabrad, Chabragh, Lytva, Hradnok, Haradna, Castrum ad Litavan etc.). In 1342 the king debarred the new castle together with the old ruined Litava and 26 villages and 6 customs from Peter and Leukus of the Dobrakutyai family because of their treachery according to a charter.

The village became deserted in the beginning of the 15th century. It became populated again only after Hussite struggles. The local population converted into Lutheran faith in the 16th century. The present Lutheran church was built between 1855 and 1859.

== Population ==
Population statistic (10 years)
Year	1995	2005	2015	2025
Count	646	588	589	547
Difference		−8.97%	+0.17%	−7.13%

Population statistic
Year	2024	2025
Count	562	547
Difference		−2.66%

It has a population of 547 people (31 December 2025).

=== Ethnicity ===
Census 2021 (1+ %)
Ethnicity	Number	Fraction
Slovak	558	97.55%
Not found out	14	2.44%
Total	572	

In year 2021 was 572 people by ethnicity 558 as Slovak, 14 as Not found out, 3 as Other, 1 as Russian and 1 as Hungarian.

Note on population: The difference values of population numbers in the table "Population statistic" and in the sections "Ethnicity" & "Religion" is caused by the use of various statistical methods.

=== Religion ===
Census 2021 (1+ %)
Religion	Number	Fraction
Roman Catholic Church	274	47.9%
Evangelical Church	152	26.57%
None	113	19.76%
Not found out	16	2.8%
Jehovah's Witnesses	8	1.4%
Total	572	

In year 2021 was 572 people by religion 274 from Roman Catholic Church, 152 from Evangelical Church, 113 from None, 16 from Not found out, 8 from Jehovah's Witnesses, 3 from Other, 2 from Paganism and natural spirituality, 2 from Greek Catholic Church, 1 from New Apostolic Church and 1 from Ad hoc movements.

== Genealogical resources ==
The records for genealogical research are available at the state archive "Statny Archiv in Banska Bystrica, Slovakia"

- Roman Catholic church records (births/marriages/deaths): 1850–1891 (parish B)
- Lutheran church records (births/marriages/deaths): 1735–1899 (parish A)

== See also ==
- List of municipalities and towns in Slovakia
