= Horné Mladonice =

Horné Mladonice Felsőlegénd
- Municipality
- Flag

- Location of Horné Mladonice in the Banská Bystrica Region Location of Horné Mladonice in Slovakia
- Coordinates: 48.35°N 19.15°E
- Country: Slovakia
- Region: Banská Bystrica Region
- District: Krupina District
- First mentioned: 1470

Area
  - Total: 11.83 km^{2} (4.57 sq mi)
- Elevation: 455 m (1,493 ft)

Population (2025)
  - Total: 192
- Time zone: UTC+1 (CET)
  - Summer (DST): UTC+2 (CEST)
- Postal code: 962 42
- Area code: +421 45
- Vehicle registration plate (until 2022): KA
- Website: www.hornemladonice.sk

Horné Mladonice (Hungarian: Felsőlegénd) is a village and municipality in the Krupina District of the Banská Bystrica Region of Slovakia.

== Geography ==
The municipality lies at an altitude of 455 metres (1,493 ft) and covers an area of 11.83 km^{2} (4.57 sq mi) (2025).

== Population ==
Population statistic (10 years)
Year	1995	2005	2015	2025
Count	198	174	172	192
Difference		−12.12%	−1.14%	+11.62%

Population statistic
Year	2024	2025
Count	190	192
Difference		+1.05%

It has a population of 192 people (31 December 2025).

=== Ethnicity ===
Census 2021 (1+ %)
Ethnicity	Number	Fraction
Slovak	184	98.92%
Romani	30	16.12%
Not found out	3	1.61%
Total	186	

In year 2021 was 186 people by ethnicity 184 as Slovak, 30 as Romani, 3 as Not found out and 1 as Hungarian.

Note on population: The difference values of population numbers in the table "Population statistic" and in the sections "Ethnicity" & "Religion" is caused by the use of various statistical methods.

=== Religion ===
Census 2021 (1+ %)
Religion	Number	Fraction
Roman Catholic Church	159	85.48%
None	16	8.6%
Not found out	4	2.15%
Evangelical Church	3	1.61%
Greek Catholic Church	2	1.08%
Total	186	

In year 2021 was 186 people by religion 159 from Roman Catholic Church, 16 from None, 4 from Not found out, 3 from Evangelical Church, 2 from Greek Catholic Church, 1 from Calvinist Church and 1 from Ad hoc movements.

== Genealogical resources ==
The records for genealogical research are available at the state archive "Statny Archiv in Banska Bystrica, Slovakia"

- Roman Catholic church records (births/marriages/deaths): 1792-1890 (parish B)
- Lutheran church records (births/marriages/deaths): 1757-1873 (parish B)

== See also ==
- List of municipalities and towns in Slovakia
