= Lackov =

Lackov Lászlód
- Municipality
- Flag

- Location of Lackov in the Banská Bystrica Region Location of Lackov in Slovakia
- Coordinates: 48.32°N 19.18°E
- Country: Slovakia
- Region: Banská Bystrica Region
- District: Krupina District
- First mentioned: 1341

Area
  - Total: 6.68 km^{2} (2.58 sq mi)
- Elevation: 483 m (1,585 ft)

Population (2025)
  - Total: 86
- Time zone: UTC+1 (CET)
  - Summer (DST): UTC+2 (CEST)
- Postal code: 962 44
- Area code: +421 45
- Vehicle registration plate (until 2022): KA
- Website: www.lackov.sk

Lackov (Hungarian: Lászlód) is a village and municipality in the Krupina District of the Banská Bystrica Region of Slovakia.

== Geography ==
The municipality lies at an altitude of 483 metres (1,585 ft) and covers an area of 6.68 km^{2} (2.58 sq mi) (2025).

== Population ==
Population statistic (10 years)
| Year | 1995 | 2005 | 2015 | 2025 |
|---|---|---|---|---|
| Count | 137 | 113 | 96 | 86 |
| Difference | | −17.51% | −15.04% | −10.41% |

Population statistic
| Year | 2024 | 2025 |
|---|---|---|
| Count | 83 | 86 |
| Difference | | +3.61% |

It has a population of 86 people (31 December 2025).

=== Ethnicity ===
Census 2021 (1+ %)
| Ethnicity | Number | Fraction |
|---|---|---|
| Slovak | 94 | 98.94% |
| Not found out | 1 | 1.05% |
| Hungarian | 1 | 1.05% |
| Total | 95 | |

In year 2021 was 95 people by ethnicity 94 as Slovak, 1 as Not found out and 1 as Hungarian.

Note on population: The difference values of population numbers in the table "Population statistic" and in the sections "Ethnicity" & "Religion" is caused by the use of various statistical methods.

=== Religion ===
Census 2021 (1+ %)
| Religion | Number | Fraction |
|---|---|---|
| Roman Catholic Church | 85 | 89.47% |
| None | 5 | 5.26% |
| Evangelical Church | 4 | 4.21% |
| Not found out | 1 | 1.05% |
| Total | 95 | |

In year 2021 was 95 people by religion 85 from Roman Catholic Church, 5 from None, 4 from Evangelical Church and 1 from Not found out.
