= Zemiansky Vrbovok =

Zemiansky Vrbovok Nemesvarbók
- Municipality
- Flag

- Location of Zemiansky Vrbovok in the Banská Bystrica Region Location of Zemiansky Vrbovok in Slovakia
- Coordinates: 48.33°N 19.15°E
- Country: Slovakia
- Region: Banská Bystrica Region
- District: Krupina District
- First mentioned: 1285

Area
  - Total: 8.40 km^{2} (3.24 sq mi)
- Elevation: 414 m (1,358 ft)

Population (2025)
  - Total: 78
- Time zone: UTC+1 (CET)
  - Summer (DST): UTC+2 (CEST)
- Postal code: 962 41
- Area code: +421 45
- Vehicle registration plate (until 2022): KA
- Website: www.zemianskyvrbovok.sk

Zemiansky Vrbovok (Hungarian: Nemesvarbók) is a village and municipality in the Krupina District of the Banská Bystrica Region of Slovakia.

In the 17th century it was the property of the Cseszneky family and according to some sources Erzsébet Cseszneky, benefactress of the Lutheran Church and mother of Mátyás Bél also was born in the village.

== Geography ==
The municipality lies at an altitude of 414 metres (1,358 ft) and covers an area of 8.40 km^{2} (3.24 sq mi) (2025).

== Population ==
Population statistic (10 years)
Year	1995	2005	2015	2025
Count	154	108	95	78
Difference		−29.87%	−12.03%	−17.89%

Population statistic
Year	2024	2025
Count	78	78
Difference		+0%

It has a population of 78 people (31 December 2025).

=== Ethnicity ===
Census 2021 (1+ %)
Ethnicity	Number	Fraction
Slovak	75	96.15%
Not found out	3	3.84%
Total	78	

In year 2021 was 78 people by ethnicity 75 as Slovak and 3 as Not found out.

Note on population: The difference values of population numbers in the table "Population statistic" and in the sections "Ethnicity" & "Religion" is caused by the use of various statistical methods.

=== Religion ===
Census 2021 (1+ %)
Religion	Number	Fraction
Roman Catholic Church	40	51.28%
Evangelical Church	21	26.92%
None	10	12.82%
Paganism and natural spirituality	4	5.13%
Not found out	3	3.85%
Total	78	

In year 2021 was 78 people by religion 40 from Roman Catholic Church, 21 from Evangelical Church, 10 from None, 4 from Paganism and natural spirituality and 3 from Not found out.
