= Lišov, Krupina District =

Lišov Lissó
- Municipality
- Flag

- Location of Lišov in the Banská Bystrica Region Location of Lišov in Slovakia
- Coordinates: 48°14′N 18°52′E
- Country: Slovakia
- Region: Banská Bystrica Region
- District: Krupina District
- First mentioned: 1235

Area
  - Total: 19.38 km^{2} (7.48 sq mi)
- Elevation: 187 m (614 ft)

Population (2025)
  - Total: 217
- Time zone: UTC+1 (CET)
  - Summer (DST): UTC+2 (CEST)
- Postal code: 962 69
- Area code: +421 45
- Vehicle registration plate (until 2022): KA
- Website: www.lisov.sk

Lišov (Hungarian: Lissó) is a village and municipality in the Krupina District of the Banská Bystrica Region of Slovakia.

== Population ==
Population statistic (10 years)
Year	1995	2005	2015	2025
Count	234	268	230	217
Difference		+14.52%	−14.17%	−5.65%

Population statistic
Year	2024	2025
Count	215	217
Difference		+0.93%

It has a population of 217 people (31 December 2025).

=== Ethnicity ===
Census 2021 (1+ %)
Ethnicity	Number	Fraction
Slovak	197	90.78%
Not found out	12	5.52%
Romani	8	3.68%
Total	217	

In year 2021 was 217 people by ethnicity 197 as Slovak, 12 as Not found out, 8 as Romani, 2 as Other and 1 as Hungarian.

Note on population: The difference values of population numbers in the table "Population statistic" and in the sections "Ethnicity" & "Religion" is caused by the use of various statistical methods.

=== Religion ===
Census 2021 (1+ %)
Religion	Number	Fraction
Evangelical Church	107	49.31%
Roman Catholic Church	70	32.26%
None	21	9.68%
Not found out	14	6.45%
Greek Catholic Church	4	1.84%
Total	217	

In year 2021 was 217 people by religion 107 from Evangelical Church, 70 from Roman Catholic Church, 21 from None, 14 from Not found out, 4 from Greek Catholic Church and 1 from Calvinist Church.
