= Ladzany =

Ladzany Ledény
- Municipality
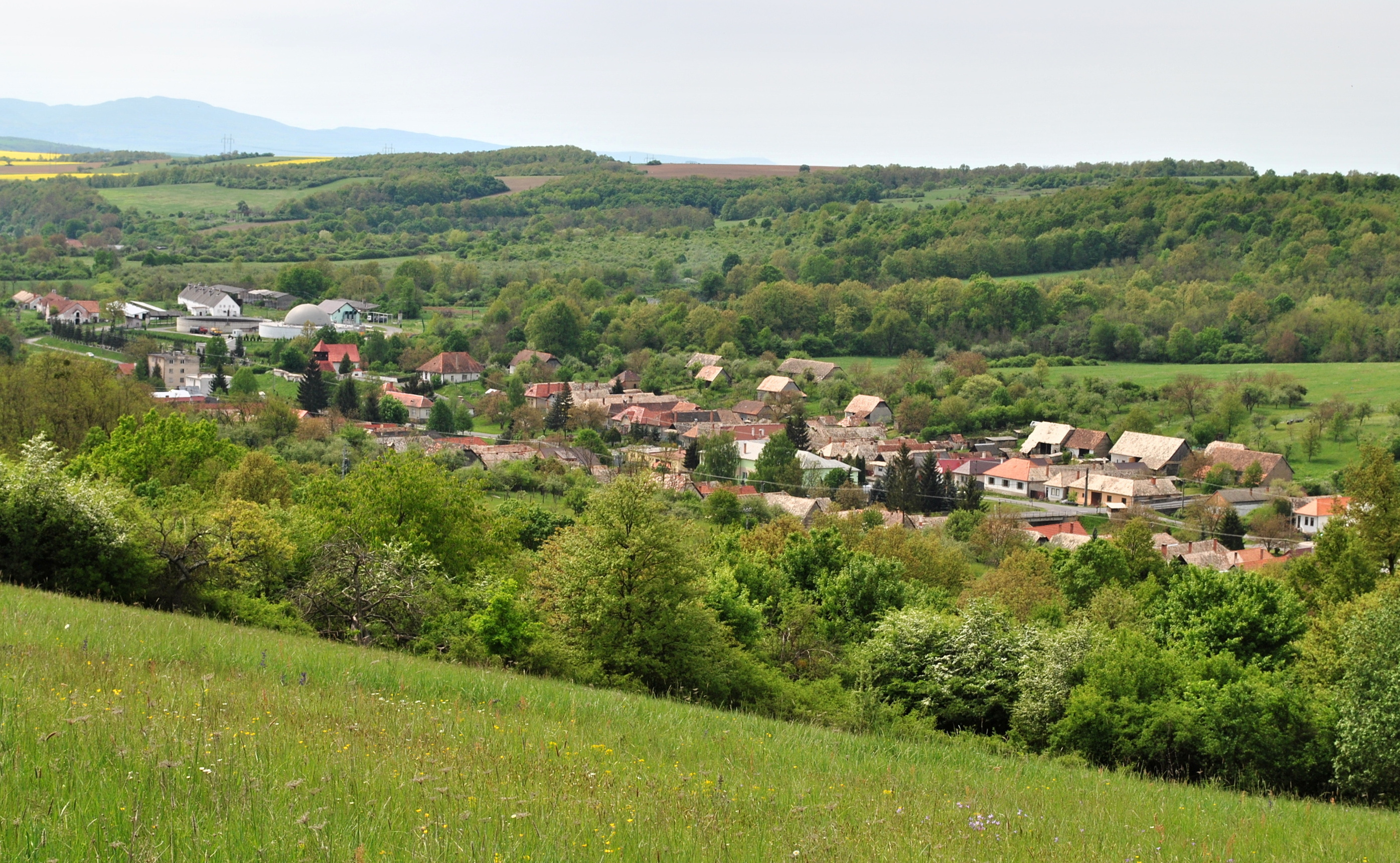

- Flag

- Location of Ladzany in the Banská Bystrica Region Location of Ladzany in Slovakia
- Coordinates: 48.27°N 18.92°E
- Country: Slovakia
- Region: Banská Bystrica Region
- District: Krupina District
- First mentioned: 1233

Area
  - Total: 26.51 km^{2} (10.24 sq mi)
- Elevation: 216 m (709 ft)

Population (2025)
  - Total: 249
- Time zone: UTC+1 (CET)
  - Summer (DST): UTC+2 (CEST)
- Postal code: 962 67
- Area code: +421 45
- Vehicle registration plate (until 2022): KA
- Website: www.ladzany.sk

Ladzany (Hungarian: Ledény) is a village and municipality in the Krupina District of the Banská Bystrica Region of Slovakia.

== Geography ==
The municipality lies at an altitude of 216 metres (709 ft) and covers an area of 26.51 km^{2} (10.24 sq mi) (2025).

== Population ==
Population statistic (10 years)
Year	1995	2005	2015	2025
Count	300	296	296	249
Difference		−1.33%	+0%	−15.87%

Population statistic
Year	2024	2025
Count	254	249
Difference		−1.96%

It has a population of 249 people (31 December 2025).

=== Ethnicity ===
Census 2021 (1+ %)
Ethnicity	Number	Fraction
Slovak	250	96.89%
Romani	11	4.26%
Not found out	6	2.32%
Czech	4	1.55%
Total	258	

In year 2021 was 258 people by ethnicity 250 as Slovak, 11 as Romani, 6 as Not found out, 4 as Czech, 1 as Polish, 1 as Other and 1 as English.

Note on population: The difference values of population numbers in the table "Population statistic" and in the sections "Ethnicity" & "Religion" is caused by the use of various statistical methods.

=== Religion ===
Census 2021 (1+ %)
Religion	Number	Fraction
Evangelical Church	127	49.22%
Roman Catholic Church	89	34.5%
None	38	14.73%
Not found out	3	1.16%
Total	258	

In year 2021 was 258 people by religion 127 from Evangelical Church, 89 from Roman Catholic Church, 38 from None, 3 from Not found out and 1 from Christian Congregations in Slovakia.

== See also ==
- List of municipalities and towns in Slovakia
