= Domaníky =

Domaníky Dömeháza
- Municipality
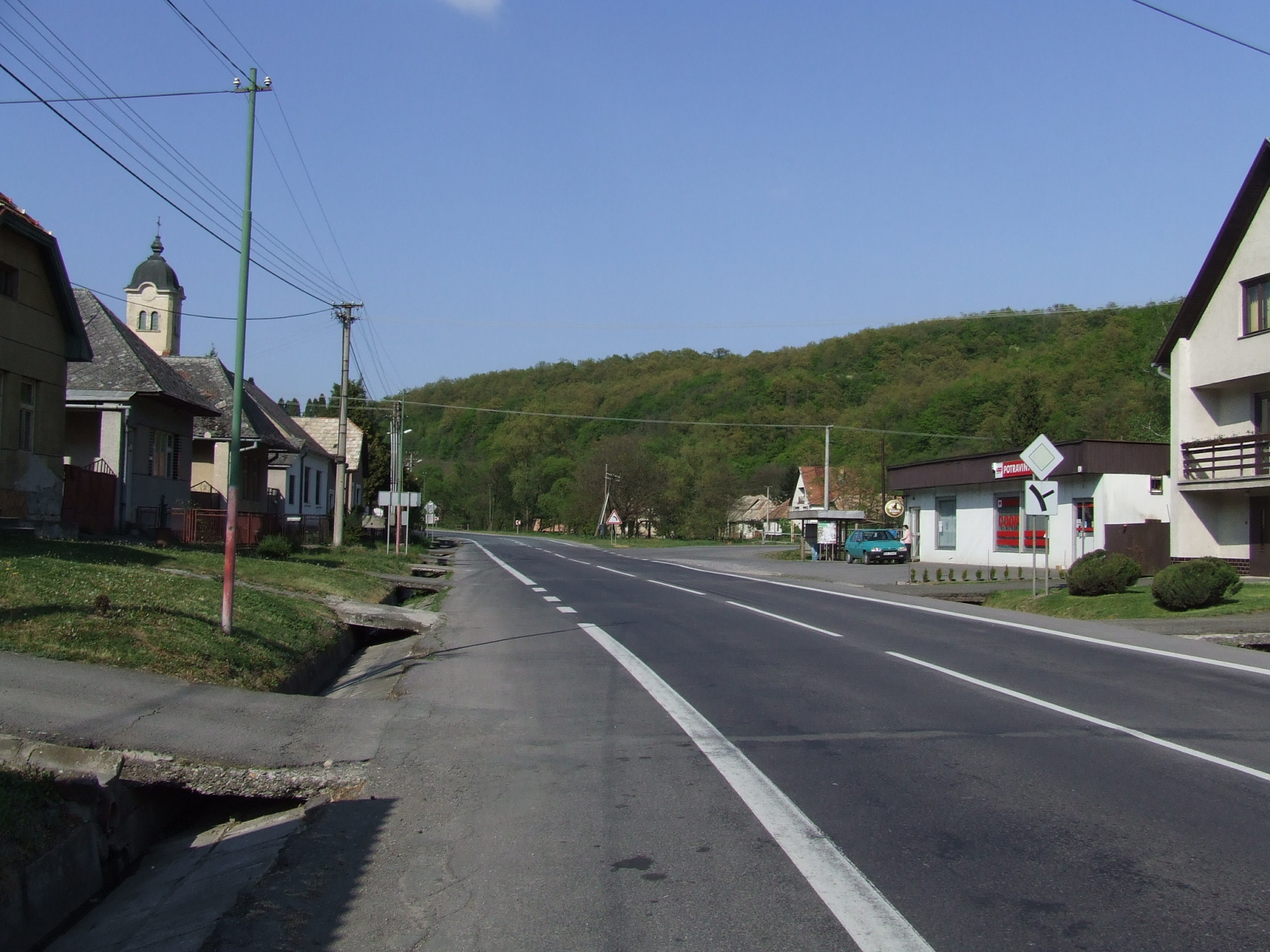

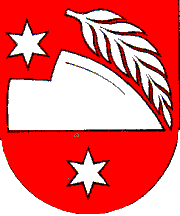
- Flag Coat of arms

- Location of Domaníky in the Banská Bystrica Region Location of Domaníky in Slovakia
- Coordinates: 48.27°N 19.00°E
- Country: Slovakia
- Region: Banská Bystrica Region
- District: Krupina District
- First mentioned: 1135

Area
  - Total: 7.87 km^{2} (3.04 sq mi)
- Elevation: 197 m (646 ft)

Population (2025)
  - Total: 211
- Time zone: UTC+1 (CET)
  - Summer (DST): UTC+2 (CEST)
- Postal code: 962 65
- Area code: +421 45
- Vehicle registration plate (until 2022): KA
- Website: www.domaniky.sk

Domaníky (German: Doming; Hungarian: Dömeháza) is a village and municipality in the Krupina District of the Banská Bystrica Region of Slovakia.

== Geography ==
The municipality lies at an altitude of 197 metres (646 ft) and covers an area of 7.87 km^{2} (3.04 sq mi) (2025).

== History ==
In historical records, the village was first mentioned in 1135 when it belonged to János and Rubin from Esztergom. In 1382 German settlers established here and old records indicate that the village was called Domanik Theutonicalis ("German Domaniky"). In the 14th century it belonged to Čabraď Castle and in the 18th century to the Fogláry and Keviczky nobles.

== Population ==
Population statistic (10 years)
Year	1995	2005	2015	2025
Count	209	187	191	211
Difference		−10.52%	+2.13%	+10.47%

Population statistic
Year	2024	2025
Count	213	211
Difference		−0.93%

It has a population of 211 people (31 December 2025).

=== Ethnicity ===
Census 2021 (1+ %)
Ethnicity	Number	Fraction
Slovak	208	97.65%
Romani	48	22.53%
Not found out	3	1.4%
Total	213	

In year 2021 was 213 people by ethnicity 208 as Slovak, 48 as Romani, 3 as Not found out and 1 as German.

Note on population: The difference values of population numbers in the table "Population statistic" and in the sections "Ethnicity" & "Religion" is caused by the use of various statistical methods.

=== Religion ===
Census 2021 (1+ %)
Religion	Number	Fraction
Roman Catholic Church	193	90.61%
None	13	6.1%
Evangelical Church	4	1.88%
Total	213	

In year 2021 was 213 people by religion 193 from Roman Catholic Church, 13 from None, 4 from Evangelical Church, 2 from Not found out and 1 from Greek Catholic Church.

== Genealogical resources ==
The records for genealogical research are available at the state archive "Statny Archiv in Banska Bystrica, Slovakia"

- Roman Catholic church records (births/marriages/deaths): 1810-1895 (parish B)
- Lutheran church records (births/marriages/deaths): 1786-1895 (parish B)

== See also ==
- List of municipalities and towns in Slovakia
