= Dolné Mladonice =

Dolné Mladonice Alsólegénd
- Municipality
- Flag

- Location of Dolné Mladonice in the Banská Bystrica Region Location of Dolné Mladonice in Slovakia
- Coordinates: 48°20′17″N 19°07′39″E
- Country: Slovakia
- Region: Banská Bystrica Region
- District: Krupina District
- First mentioned: 1391

Area
  - Total: 6.42 km^{2} (2.48 sq mi)
- Elevation: 392 m (1,286 ft)

Population (2025)
  - Total: 126
- Time zone: UTC+1 (CET)
  - Summer (DST): UTC+2 (CEST)
- Postal code: 962 42
- Area code: +421 45
- Vehicle registration plate (until 2022): KA
- Website: www.dolnemladonice.sk

Dolné Mladonice (Hungarian: Alsólegénd) is a village and municipality in the Krupina District of the Banská Bystrica Region of Slovakia.

== Geography ==
The municipality lies at an altitude of 392 metres (1,286 ft) and covers an area of 6.42 km^{2} (2.48 sq mi) (2025).

== History ==
In historical records, the village was first mentioned in 1391 (Legyend), when it belonged to Bzovík Castle.

== Population ==
Population statistic (10 years)
Year	1995	2005	2015	2025
Count	159	139	130	126
Difference		−12.57%	−6.47%	−3.07%

Population statistic
Year	2024	2025
Count	127	126
Difference		−0.78%

It has a population of 126 people (31 December 2025).

=== Ethnicity ===
Census 2021 (1+ %)
Ethnicity	Number	Fraction
Slovak	126	100%
Total	126	

In year 2021 was 126 people by ethnicity 126 as Slovak and 1 as Russian.

Note on population: The difference values of population numbers in the table "Population statistic" and in the sections "Ethnicity" & "Religion" is caused by the use of various statistical methods.

=== Religion ===
Census 2021 (1+ %)
Religion	Number	Fraction
Roman Catholic Church	91	72.22%
None	21	16.67%
Evangelical Church	9	7.14%
Ad hoc movements	2	1.59%
Total	126	

In year 2021 was 126 people by religion 91 from Roman Catholic Church, 21 from None, 9 from Evangelical Church, 2 from Ad hoc movements, 1 from Christian Congregations in Slovakia, 1 from Other and 1 from Greek Catholic Church.

== Genealogical resources ==
The records for genealogical research are available at the state archive "Statny Archiv in Banska Bystrica, Slovakia"

- Roman Catholic church records (births/marriages/deaths): 1686-1895 (parish B)
- Lutheran church records (births/marriages/deaths): 1757-1873 (parish B)

== See also ==
- List of municipalities and towns in Slovakia
