= Žibritov =

Žibritov Zsibritó
- Municipality
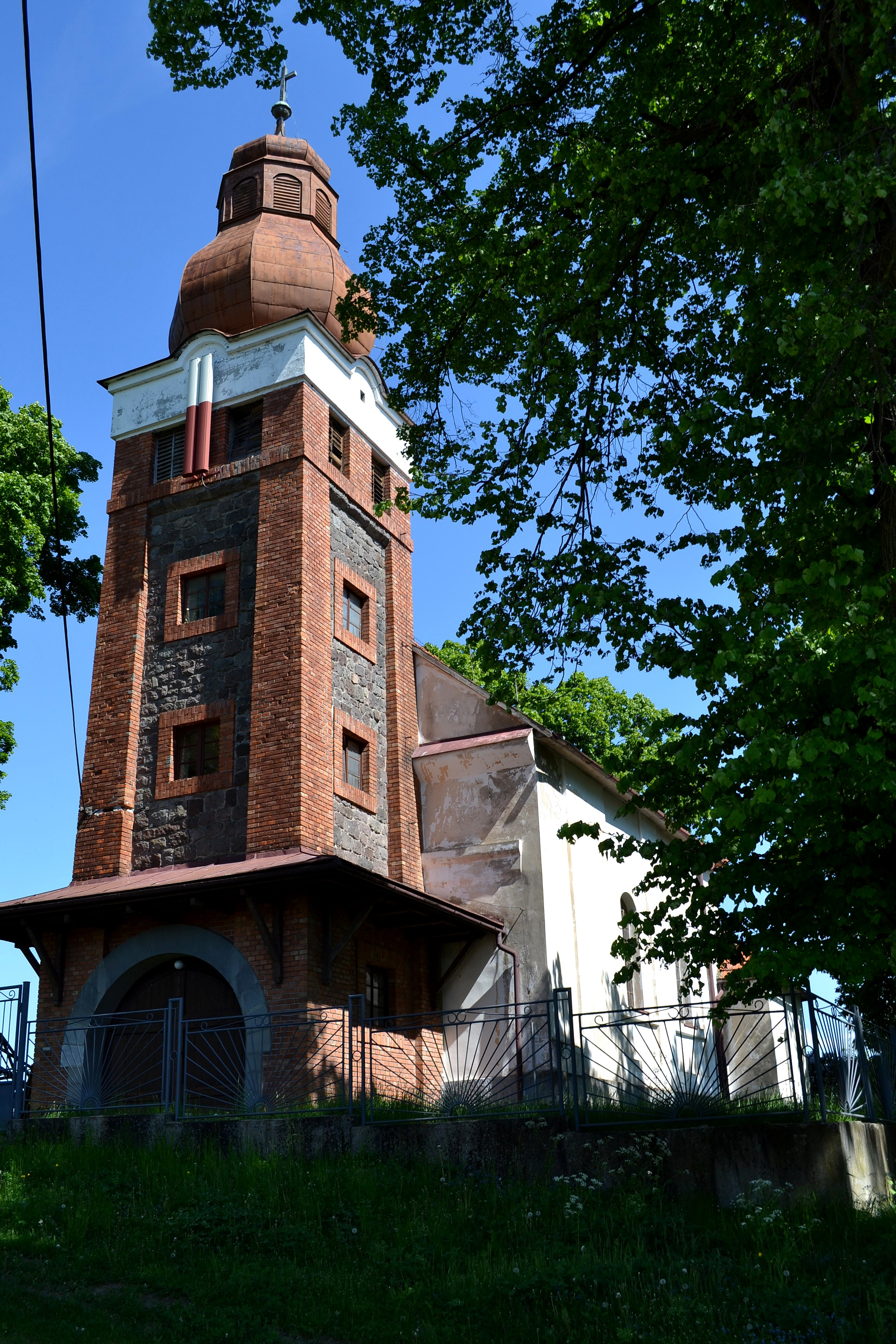

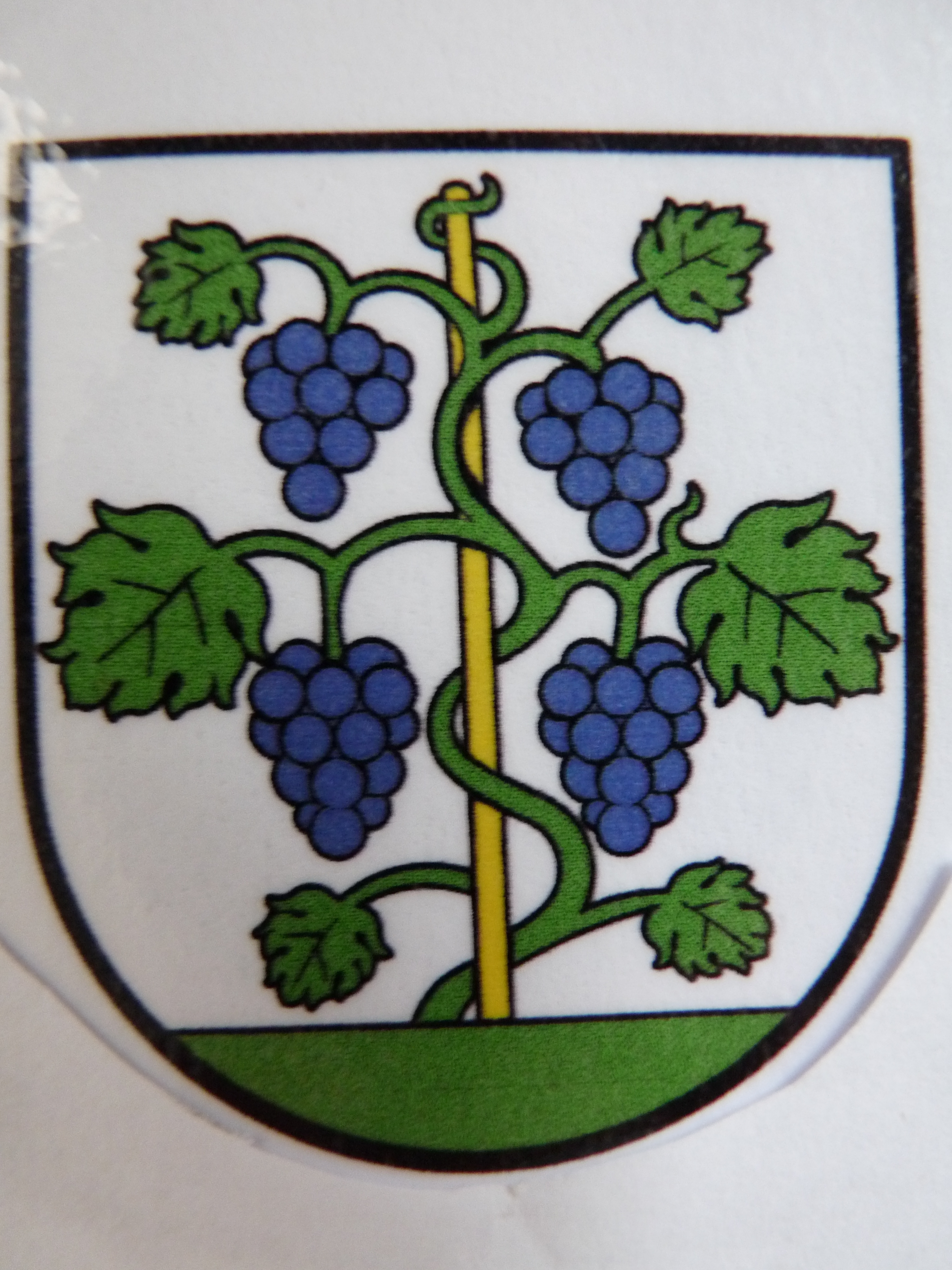
- Flag Coat of arms

- Location of Žibritov in the Banská Bystrica Region Location of Žibritov in Slovakia
- Coordinates: 48.40°N 18.98°E
- Country: Slovakia
- Region: Banská Bystrica Region
- District: Krupina District
- First mentioned: 1266

Area
  - Total: 9.95 km^{2} (3.84 sq mi)
- Elevation: 487 m (1,598 ft)

Population (2025)
  - Total: 61
- Time zone: UTC+1 (CET)
  - Summer (DST): UTC+2 (CEST)
- Postal code: 963 01
- Area code: +421 45
- Vehicle registration plate (until 2022): KA
- Website: zibritov.webnode.sk

Žibritov (Hungarian: Zsibritó) is a village and municipality in the Krupina District of the Banská Bystrica Region of Slovakia.

== Geography ==
The municipality lies at an altitude of 487 metres (1,598 ft) and covers an area of 9.95 km^{2} (3.84 sq mi) (2025).

== Population ==
Population statistic (10 years)
Year	1995	2005	2015	2025
Count	91	79	65	61
Difference		−13.18%	−17.72%	−6.15%

Population statistic
Year	2024	2025
Count	62	61
Difference		−1.61%

It has a population of 61 people (31 December 2025).

=== Ethnicity ===
Census 2021 (1+ %)
Ethnicity	Number	Fraction
Slovak	67	91.78%
Romanian	3	4.1%
Not found out	2	2.73%
Hungarian	1	1.36%
Total	73	

In year 2021 was 73 people by ethnicity 67 as Slovak, 3 as Romanian, 2 as Not found out and 1 as Hungarian.

Note on population: The difference values of population numbers in the table "Population statistic" and in the sections "Ethnicity" & "Religion" is caused by the use of various statistical methods.

=== Religion ===
Census 2021 (1+ %)
Religion	Number	Fraction
Roman Catholic Church	37	50.68%
Evangelical Church	19	26.03%
None	13	17.81%
Not found out	4	5.48%
Total	73	

In year 2021 was 73 people by religion 37 from Roman Catholic Church, 19 from Evangelical Church, 13 from None and 4 from Not found out.
