= Selce, Krupina District =

Selce Szelenc
- Municipality
- Flag

- Location of Selce in the Banská Bystrica Region Location of Selce in Slovakia
- Coordinates: 48.2556°N 19.0417°E
- Country: Slovakia
- Region: Banská Bystrica Region
- District: Krupina District
- First mentioned: 1303

Area
  - Total: 5.13 km^{2} (1.98 sq mi)
- Elevation: 320 m (1,050 ft)

Population (2025)
  - Total: 82
- Time zone: UTC+1 (CET)
  - Summer (DST): UTC+2 (CEST)
- Postal code: 962 51
- Area code: +421 45
- Vehicle registration plate (until 2022): KA
- Website: www.obecselce.sk

Selce (Hungarian: Szelenc) is a village and municipality in the Krupina District of the Banská Bystrica Region of Slovakia.

== Population ==
Population statistic (10 years)
Year	1995	2005	2015	2025
Count	134	110	100	82
Difference		−17.91%	−9.09%	−18%

Population statistic
Year	2024	2025
Count	82	82
Difference		+0%

It has a population of 82 people (31 December 2025).

=== Ethnicity ===
Census 2021 (1+ %)
Ethnicity	Number	Fraction
Slovak	90	96.77%
Hungarian	3	3.22%
Total	93	

In year 2021 was 93 people by ethnicity 90 as Slovak and 3 as Hungarian.

Note on population: The difference values of population numbers in the table "Population statistic" and in the sections "Ethnicity" & "Religion" is caused by the use of various statistical methods.

=== Religion ===
Census 2021 (1+ %)
Religion	Number	Fraction
Roman Catholic Church	84	90.32%
None	5	5.38%
Evangelical Church	2	2.15%
Ad hoc movements	2	2.15%
Total	93	

In year 2021 was 93 people by religion 84 from Roman Catholic Church, 5 from None, 2 from Evangelical Church and 2 from Ad hoc movements.
