= Krupina District =

Coordinates: 48°21′15″N 19°4′1″E

- District
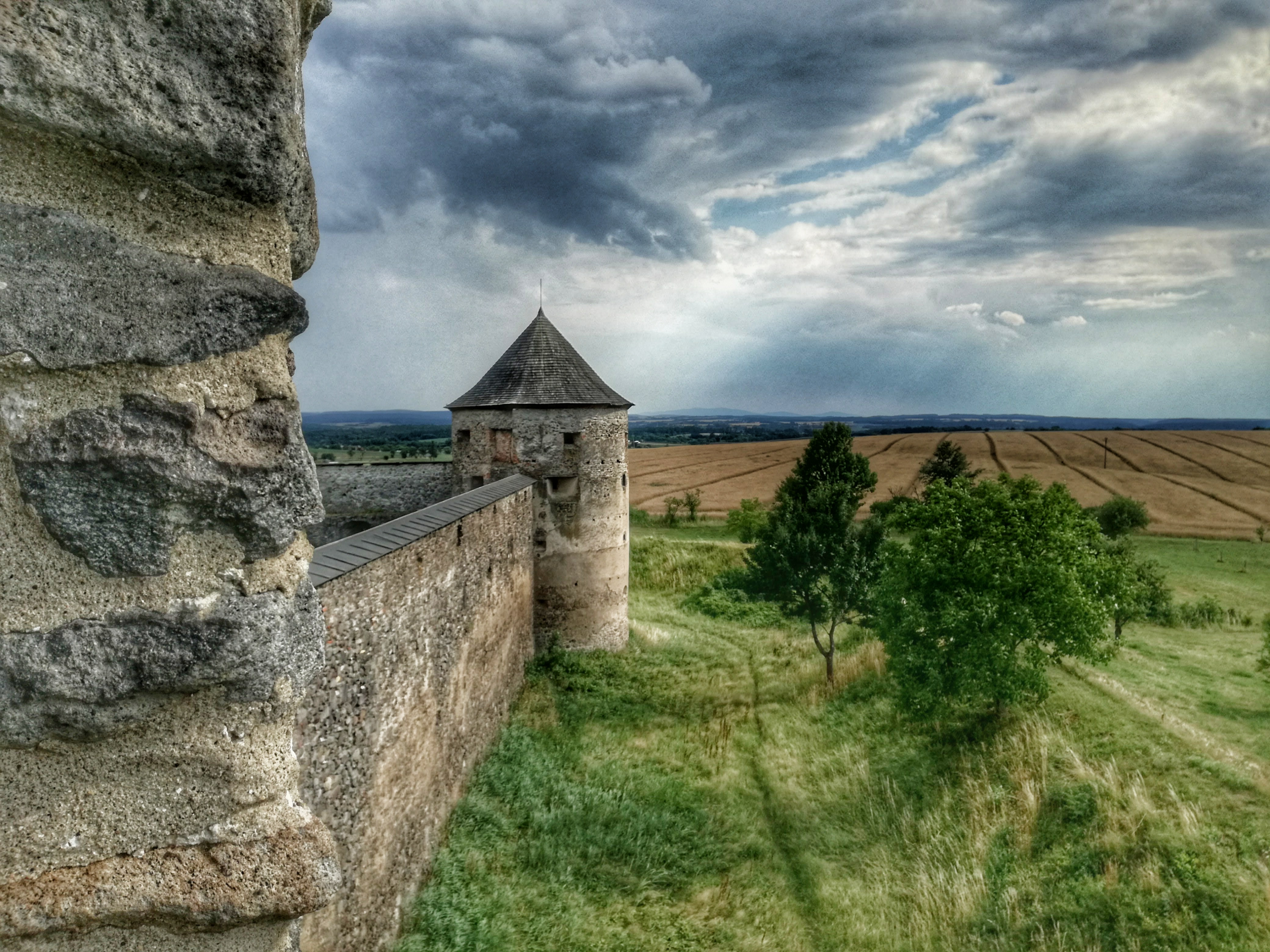
- Country: Slovakia
- Region (kraj): Banská Bystrica Region
- Seat: Krupina

Area
  - Total: 584.89 km^{2} (225.83 sq mi)

Population (2025)
  - Total: 21,129
- Time zone: UTC+1 (CET)
  - Summer (DST): UTC+2 (CEST)
- Telephone prefix: 045
- Vehicle registration plate (until 2022): KA
- Municipalities: 36

Krupina District (Slovak: okres Krupina) is a district in the Banská Bystrica Region of central Slovakia. Until 1918, the district was in the county of Kingdom of Hungary Hont County.

== Population ==
Population statistic (10 years)
| Year | 1995 | 2005 | 2015 | 2025 |
|---|---|---|---|---|
| Count | 23,037 | 22,596 | 22,530 | 21,129 |
| Difference | | −1.91% | −0.29% | −6.21% |

Population statistic
| Year | 2024 | 2025 |
|---|---|---|
| Count | 21,209 | 21,129 |
| Difference | | −0.37% |

It has a population of 21,129 people (31 December 2025).

Historical population
| Year | Pop. | ±% |
|---|---|---|
| 1970 | 25,265 | — |
| 1980 | 24,063 | −4.8% |
| 1991 | 23,325 | −3.1% |
| 2001 | 22,885 | −1.9% |
| 2011 | 22,927 | +0.2% |
| 2021 | 21,517 | −6.1% |
Source: Statistical Office of the Slovak Republic

=== Ethnicity ===
Census 2021 (1+ %)
| Ethnicity | Number | Fraction |
|---|---|---|
| Slovak | 20,550 | 92.12% |
| Not found out | 748 | 3.35% |
| Romani | 529 | 2.37% |
| Total | 22,307 | |

In year 2021 was 22,307 people by ethnicity 20,550 as Slovak, 748 as Not found out, 529 as Romani, 117 as Hungarian, 82 as Czech, 68 as Other, 39 as Ukrainian, 33 as Russian, 20 as Italian, 18 as German, 17 as Rusyn, 15 as Romanian, 15 as Polish, 14 as Vietnamese, 14 as English, 5 as Moravian, 5 as Canadian, 4 as Serbian, 4 as French, 3 as Greek, 2 as Jewish, 2 as Austrian, 2 as Croatian and 1 as Silesian.

Note on population: The difference values of population numbers in the table "Population statistic" and in the sections "Ethnicity" & "Religion" is caused by the use of various statistical methods.

=== Religion ===
Census 2021 (1+ %)
| Religion | Number | Fraction |
|---|---|---|
| Roman Catholic Church | 14,248 | 66.22% |
| Evangelical Church | 2997 | 13.93% |
| None | 2992 | 13.91% |
| Not found out | 789 | 3.67% |
| Total | 21,517 | |

In year 2021 was 21,517 people by religion 14,248 from Roman Catholic Church, 2997 from Evangelical Church, 2992 from None, 789 from Not found out, 100 from Greek Catholic Church, 68 from Ad hoc movements, 48 from Eastern Orthodox Church, 38 from Other and not ascertained christian church, 36 from Other, 31 from Paganism and natural spirituality, 31 from Buddhism, 30 from Calvinist Church, 29 from Jehovah's Witnesses, 24 from Christian Congregations in Slovakia, 18 from Seventh-day Adventist Church, 13 from Islam, 8 from Old Catholic Church, 5 from Apostolic Church, 4 from United Methodist Church, 3 from Hinduism, 1 from Jewish community, 1 from New Apostolic Church, 1 from Czechoslovak Hussite Church, 1 from Church of Jesus Christ of Latter-day Saints and 1 from Bahá'i Community.

== Municipalities ==
| Municipality | Area [km^{2}] | Population |
|---|---|---|
| Bzovík | 12.99 | 1,102 |
| Cerovo | 30.27 | 547 |
| Čabradský Vrbovok | 23.31 | 223 |
| Čekovce | 15.02 | 446 |
| Devičie | 14.06 | 294 |
| Dolné Mladonice | 6.42 | 126 |
| Dolný Badín | 6.24 | 250 |
| Domaníky | 7.87 | 211 |
| Drážovce | 8.02 | 114 |
| Drienovo | 15.32 | 94 |
| Dudince | 6.84 | 1,377 |
| Hontianske Moravce | 16.83 | 755 |
| Hontianske Nemce | 30.84 | 1,365 |
| Hontianske Tesáre | 33.11 | 854 |
| Horné Mladonice | 11.83 | 192 |
| Horný Badín | 5.62 | 169 |
| Jalšovík | 5.96 | 175 |
| Kozí Vrbovok | 5.34 | 154 |
| Kráľovce-Krnišov | 19.95 | 153 |
| Krupina | 88.66 | 7,496 |
| Lackov | 6.68 | 86 |
| Ladzany | 26.51 | 249 |
| Lišov | 19.38 | 217 |
| Litava | 22.12 | 742 |
| Medovarce | 13.23 | 214 |
| Rykynčice | 19.17 | 259 |
| Sebechleby | 30.42 | 1,169 |
| Selce | 5.13 | 82 |
| Senohrad | 15.20 | 706 |
| Sudince | 4.09 | 96 |
| Súdovce | 9.77 | 209 |
| Terany | 10.83 | 573 |
| Trpín | 6.35 | 116 |
| Uňatín | 12.99 | 175 |
| Zemiansky Vrbovok | 8.40 | 78 |
| Žibritov | 9.95 | 61 |

Population and area values are current for year 2025.
