= Sudince =

Sudince Ösöd
- Municipality
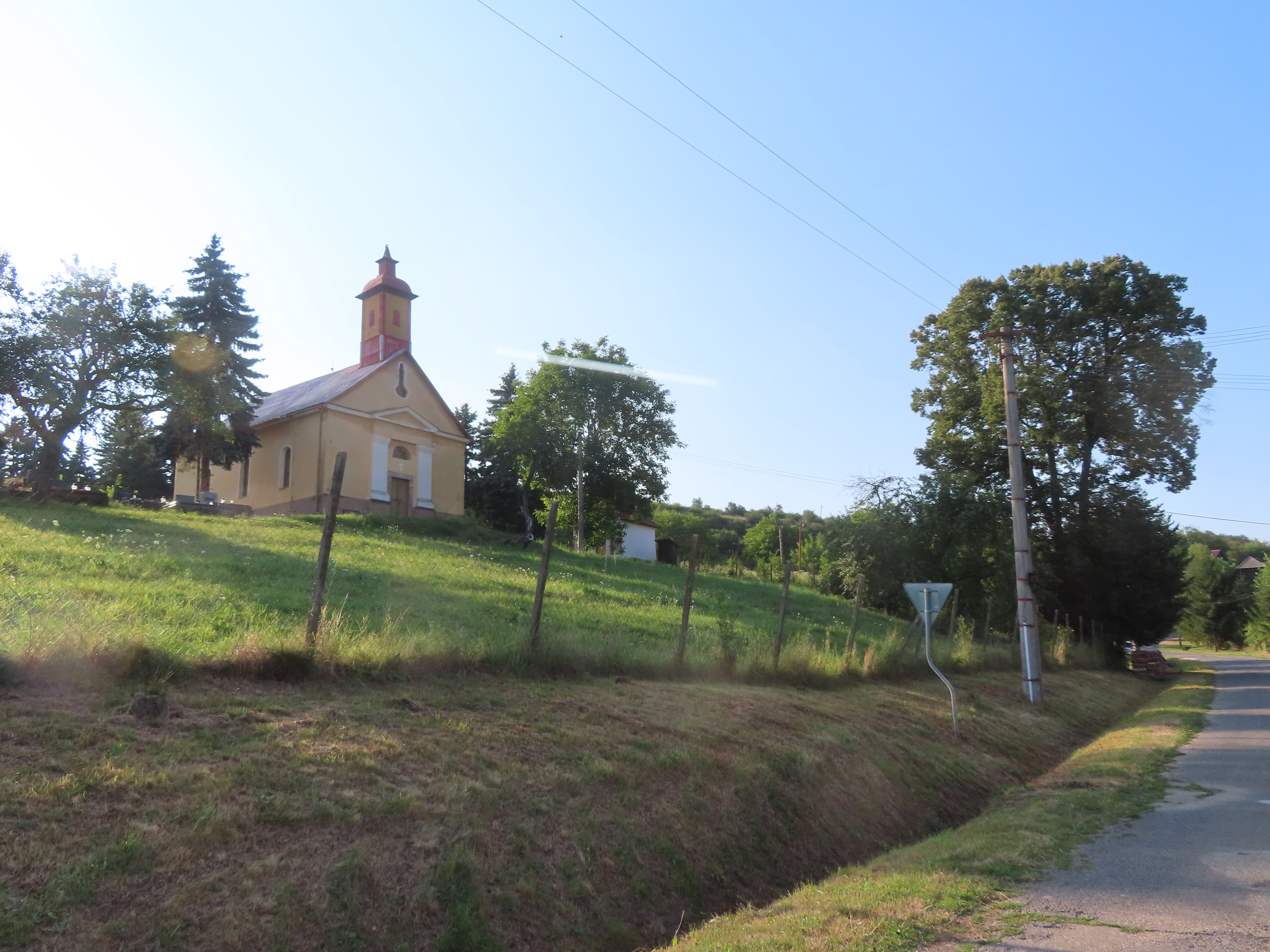

- Flag

- Location of Sudince in the Banská Bystrica Region Location of Sudince in Slovakia
- Coordinates: 48.22°N 18.88°E
- Country: Slovakia
- Region: Banská Bystrica Region
- District: Krupina District
- First mentioned: 1245

Area
  - Total: 4.09 km^{2} (1.58 sq mi)
- Elevation: 185 m (607 ft)

Population (2025)
  - Total: 96
- Time zone: UTC+1 (CET)
  - Summer (DST): UTC+2 (CEST)
- Postal code: 962 70
- Area code: +421 45
- Vehicle registration plate (until 2022): KA
- Website: www.sudince.sk

Sudince (Hungarian: Ösöd) is a village and municipality in the Krupina District of the Banská Bystrica Region of Slovakia.

== Geography ==
The municipality lies at an altitude of 185 metres (607 ft) and covers an area of 4.09 km^{2} (1.58 sq mi) (2025).

== Population ==
Population statistic (10 years)
Year	1995	2005	2015	2025
Count	69	63	88	96
Difference		−8.69%	+39.68%	+9.09%

Population statistic
Year	2024	2025
Count	92	96
Difference		+4.34%

It has a population of 96 people (31 December 2025).

=== Ethnicity ===
Census 2021 (1+ %)
Ethnicity	Number	Fraction
Slovak	85	100%
Total	85	

In year 2021 was 85 people by ethnicity 85 as Slovak.

Note on population: The difference values of population numbers in the table "Population statistic" and in the sections "Ethnicity" & "Religion" is caused by the use of various statistical methods.

=== Religion ===
Census 2021 (1+ %)
Religion	Number	Fraction
Roman Catholic Church	57	67.06%
None	15	17.65%
Evangelical Church	12	14.12%
Paganism and natural spirituality	1	1.18%
Total	85	

In year 2021 was 85 people by religion 57 from Roman Catholic Church, 15 from None, 12 from Evangelical Church and 1 from Paganism and natural spirituality.

The majority of the municipality's population consists of the members of the local Roma community. In 2019, they constituted an estimated 70% of the population.
