= Jalšovík =

Jalšovík Bozókalsók
- Municipality
- Flag

- Location of Jalšovík in the Banská Bystrica Region Location of Jalšovík in Slovakia
- Coordinates: 48.31°N 19.12°E
- Country: Slovakia
- Region: Banská Bystrica Region
- District: Krupina District
- First mentioned: 1542

Area
  - Total: 5.96 km^{2} (2.30 sq mi)
- Elevation: 342 m (1,122 ft)

Population (2025)
  - Total: 175
- Time zone: UTC+1 (CET)
  - Summer (DST): UTC+2 (CEST)
- Postal code: 962 41
- Area code: +421 45
- Vehicle registration plate (until 2022): KA
- Website: www.jalsovik.sk

Jalšovík (Hungarian: Bozókalsók) is a village and municipality in the Krupina District of the Banská Bystrica Region of Slovakia.

== Geography ==
The municipality lies at an altitude of 342 metres (1,122 ft) and covers an area of 5.96 km^{2} (2.30 sq mi) (2025).

== History ==
It arose in 1902 for the union of Dolný and Horný Jalšovík. Dolný and Horný Jalšovík in historical records were first mentioned in 1542 as belonging to Bzovík Castle. After on, they passed to local noble families: Szelény, Bory, Balogy.

== Population ==
Population statistic (10 years)
Year	1995	2005	2015	2025
Count	220	200	189	175
Difference		−9.09%	−5.5%	−7.40%

Population statistic
Year	2024	2025
Count	175	175
Difference		+0%

It has a population of 175 people (31 December 2025).

=== Ethnicity ===
Census 2021 (1+ %)
Ethnicity	Number	Fraction
Slovak	185	98.4%
Romani	4	2.12%
Other	3	1.59%
Not found out	2	1.06%
Total	188	

In year 2021 was 188 people by ethnicity 185 as Slovak, 4 as Romani, 3 as Other, 2 as Not found out, 1 as Russian and 1 as Polish.

Note on population: The difference values of population numbers in the table "Population statistic" and in the sections "Ethnicity" & "Religion" is caused by the use of various statistical methods.

=== Religion ===
Census 2021 (1+ %)
Religion	Number	Fraction
Roman Catholic Church	167	88.83%
None	8	4.26%
Evangelical Church	6	3.19%
Not found out	2	1.06%
Ad hoc movements	2	1.06%
Total	188	

In year 2021 was 188 people by religion 167 from Roman Catholic Church, 8 from None, 6 from Evangelical Church, 2 from Not found out, 2 from Ad hoc movements, 1 from Other and not ascertained christian church, 1 from Other and 1 from Greek Catholic Church.

== Genealogical resources ==
The records for genealogical research are available at the state archive "Statny Archiv in Banska Bystrica, Slovakia"

- Roman Catholic Church records (births/marriages/deaths): 1686-1895 (parish B)

== See also ==
- List of municipalities and towns in Slovakia
