= Kozí Vrbovok =

Kozí Vrbovok Kecskevarbók
- Municipality
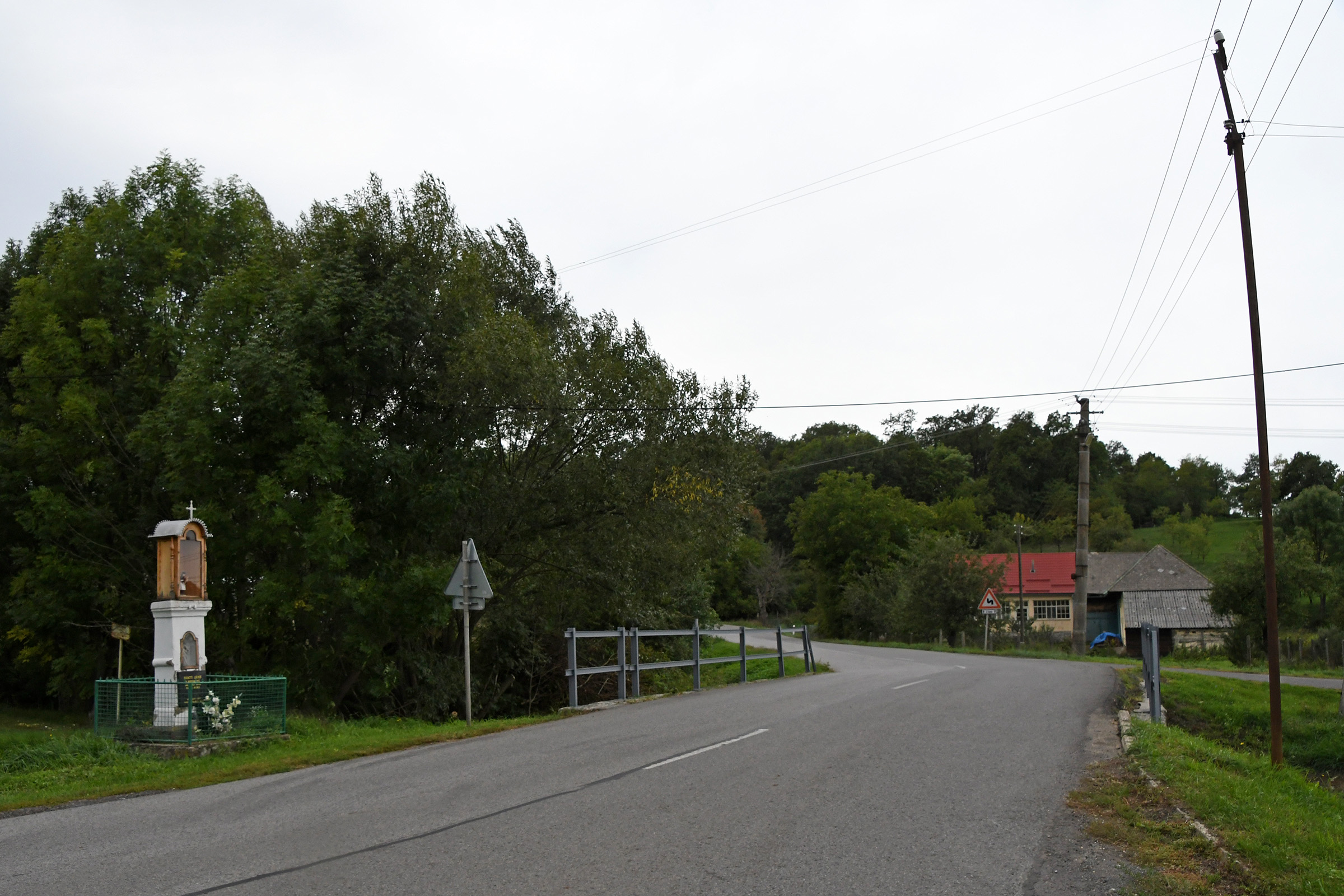

- Flag

- Location of Kozí Vrbovok in the Banská Bystrica Region Location of Kozí Vrbovok in Slovakia
- Coordinates: 48.30°N 19.12°E
- Country: Slovakia
- Region: Banská Bystrica Region
- District: Krupina District
- First mentioned: 1415

Area
  - Total: 5.34 km^{2} (2.06 sq mi)
- Elevation: 354 m (1,161 ft)

Population (2025)
  - Total: 154
- Time zone: UTC+1 (CET)
  - Summer (DST): UTC+2 (CEST)
- Postal code: 962 41
- Area code: +421 45
- Vehicle registration plate (until 2022): KA
- Website: www.kozivrbovok.sk

Kozí Vrbovok (Hungarian: Kecskevarbók) is a village and municipality in the Krupina District of the Banská Bystrica Region of Slovakia, 4 miles (6.4 km) south-south east of Krupina. As of 2013 it had a population of 169 people. The municipality covers an area of 5.34 km².

== Geography ==
The municipality lies at an altitude of 354 metres (1,161 ft) and covers an area of 5.34 km^{2} (2.06 sq mi) (2025).

== History ==
The first written mention of Kozí Vrbovok comes from 1262, when the Hungarian king Béla IV gave the territory to the Kaza family, and it was documented in 1415 as an asset of the local gentry. In 1241, the area came into the hands of the Tartars, who attacked the monastery in the nearby settlement of Bzovík. The monastery was attacked again in 1433 and pillaged. The village was struck hard by the plague in 1644. In 1808, during the Ottoman period, it was referred to on a map as "Kecske Varbok".

In 1964, the municipality underwent improvements in infrastructure, with water supply and irrigation, a kindergarten with capacity for 30 children and a primary school.

== Population ==
Population statistic (10 years)
Year	1995	2005	2015	2025
Count	175	180	165	154
Difference		+2.85%	−8.33%	−6.66%

Population statistic
Year	2024	2025
Count	149	154
Difference		+3.35%

It has a population of 154 people (31 December 2025).

=== Ethnicity ===
Census 2021 (1+ %)
Ethnicity	Number	Fraction
Slovak	156	100%
Total	156	

In year 2021 was 156 people by ethnicity 156 as Slovak and 1 as Czech.

Note on population: The difference values of population numbers in the table "Population statistic" and in the sections "Ethnicity" & "Religion" is caused by the use of various statistical methods.

=== Religion ===
Census 2021 (1+ %)
Religion	Number	Fraction
Roman Catholic Church	144	92.31%
None	9	5.77%
Evangelical Church	3	1.92%
Total	156	

In year 2021 was 156 people by religion 144 from Roman Catholic Church, 9 from None and 3 from Evangelical Church.
