= Terany =

Terany Terény
- Municipality
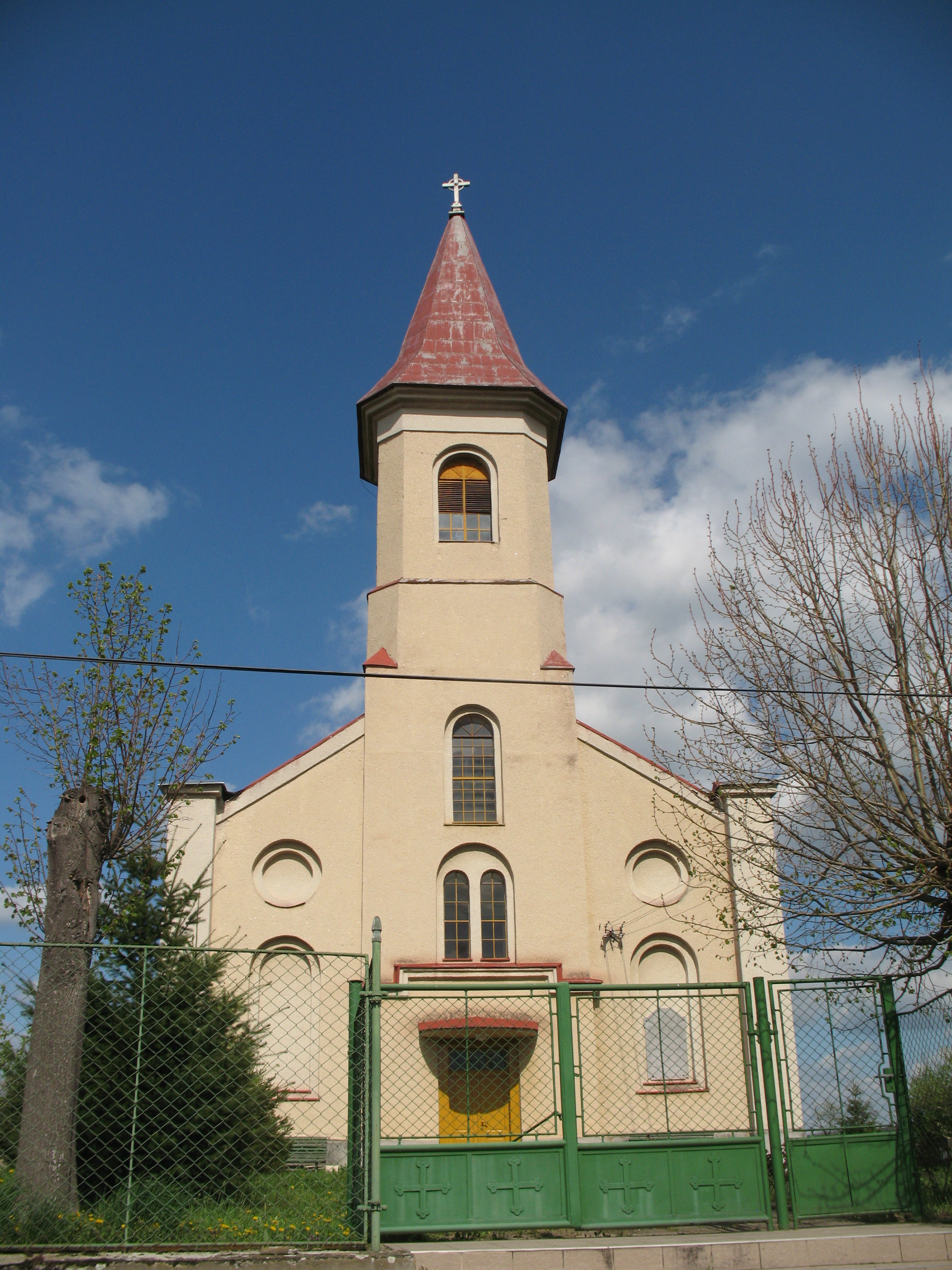

- Flag

- Location of Terany in the Banská Bystrica Region Location of Terany in Slovakia
- Coordinates: 48.18°N 18.90°E
- Country: Slovakia
- Region: Banská Bystrica Region
- District: Krupina District
- First mentioned: 1298

Area
  - Total: 10.83 km^{2} (4.18 sq mi)
- Elevation: 144 m (472 ft)

Population (2025)
  - Total: 573
- Time zone: UTC+1 (CET)
  - Summer (DST): UTC+2 (CEST)
- Postal code: 962 68
- Area code: +421 45
- Vehicle registration plate (until 2022): KA
- Website: www.obecterany.sk

Terany (Hungarian: Terény) is a village and municipality in the Krupina District of the Banská Bystrica Region of Slovakia.

== Geography ==
The municipality lies at an altitude of 144 metres (472 ft) and covers an area of 10.83 km^{2} (4.18 sq mi) (2025).

== Population ==
Population statistic (10 years)
Year	1995	2005	2015	2025
Count	721	742	638	573
Difference		+2.91%	−14.01%	−10.18%

Population statistic
Year	2024	2025
Count	588	573
Difference		−2.55%

It has a population of 573 people (31 December 2025).

=== Ethnicity ===
Census 2021 (1+ %)
Ethnicity	Number	Fraction
Slovak	555	95.19%
Romani	52	8.91%
Not found out	26	4.45%
Hungarian	6	1.02%
Total	583	

In year 2021 was 583 people by ethnicity 555 as Slovak, 52 as Romani, 26 as Not found out, 6 as Hungarian, 5 as Czech, 2 as Other and 1 as Russian.

Note on population: The difference values of population numbers in the table "Population statistic" and in the sections "Ethnicity" & "Religion" is caused by the use of various statistical methods.

=== Religion ===
Census 2021 (1+ %)
Religion	Number	Fraction
Roman Catholic Church	231	39.62%
Evangelical Church	183	31.39%
None	129	22.13%
Not found out	32	5.49%
Total	583	

In year 2021 was 583 people by religion 231 from Roman Catholic Church, 183 from Evangelical Church, 129 from None, 32 from Not found out, 3 from Jehovah's Witnesses, 1 from Other and not ascertained christian church, 1 from Christian Congregations in Slovakia, 1 from Other, 1 from Greek Catholic Church and 1 from Ad hoc movements.
