= Čekovce =

Čekovce Csákóc
- Municipality
- Flag

- Location of Čekovce in the Banská Bystrica Region Location of Čekovce in Slovakia
- Coordinates: 48.35°N 19.13°E
- Country: Slovakia
- Region: Banská Bystrica Region
- District: Krupina District
- First mentioned: 1391

Area
  - Total: 15.02 km^{2} (5.80 sq mi)
- Elevation: 396 m (1,299 ft)

Population (2025)
  - Total: 446
- Time zone: UTC+1 (CET)
  - Summer (DST): UTC+2 (CEST)
- Postal code: 962 42
- Area code: +421 45
- Vehicle registration plate (until 2022): KA
- Website: www.cekovce.sk

Čekovce (Hungarian: Csákóc) is a village and municipality in the Krupina District of the Banská Bystrica Region of Slovakia.

== Geography ==
The municipality lies at an altitude of 396 metres (1,299 ft) and covers an area of 15.02 km^{2} (5.80 sq mi) (2025).

== History ==
In historical records, the village was first mentioned in 1391 (Cheke). It belonged to Bzovík, and in the 17th century to Esztergom' Seminary.

== Genealogical resources ==
The records for genealogical research are available at the state archive "Statny Archiv in Banska Bystrica, Slovakia"

- Roman Catholic church records (births/marriages/deaths): 1686-1895 (parish B)
- Lutheran church records (births/marriages/deaths): 1757-1873 (parish B)

== Population ==
Population statistic (10 years)
| Year | 1995 | 2005 | 2015 | 2025 |
|---|---|---|---|---|
| Count | 499 | 409 | 458 | 446 |
| Difference | | −18.03% | +11.98% | −2.62% |

Population statistic
| Year | 2024 | 2025 |
|---|---|---|
| Count | 447 | 446 |
| Difference | | −0.22% |

It has a population of 446 people (31 December 2025).

=== Ethnicity ===
Census 2021 (1+ %)
| Ethnicity | Number | Fraction |
|---|---|---|
| Slovak | 416 | 92.44% |
| Not found out | 19 | 4.22% |
| Romani | 18 | 4% |
| Total | 450 | |

In year 2021 was 450 people by ethnicity 416 as Slovak, 19 as Not found out, 18 as Romani and 1 as Other.

Note on population: The difference values of population numbers in the table "Population statistic" and in the sections "Ethnicity" & "Religion" is caused by the use of various statistical methods.

=== Religion ===
Census 2021 (1+ %)
| Religion | Number | Fraction |
|---|---|---|
| Roman Catholic Church | 349 | 77.56% |
| Evangelical Church | 26 | 5.78% |
| None | 26 | 5.78% |
| Not found out | 22 | 4.89% |
| Calvinist Church | 17 | 3.78% |
| Total | 450 | |

In year 2021 was 450 people by religion 349 from Roman Catholic Church, 26 from Evangelical Church, 26 from None, 22 from Not found out, 17 from Calvinist Church, 4 from Greek Catholic Church, 2 from Jehovah's Witnesses, 2 from Other, 1 from Old Catholic Church and 1 from Church of Jesus Christ of Latter-day Saints.

== See also ==
- List of municipalities and towns in Slovakia
