= Senohrad =

Senohrad Szénavár
- Municipality
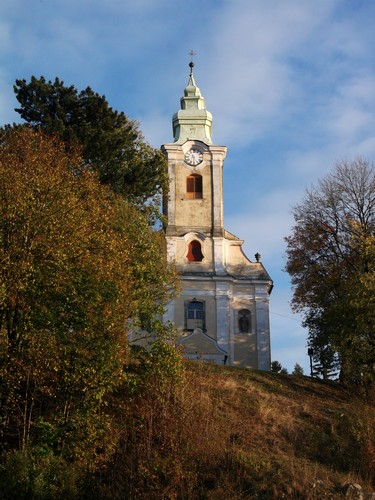

- Flag

- Location of Senohrad in the Banská Bystrica Region Location of Senohrad in Slovakia
- Coordinates: 48.37°N 19.20°E
- Country: Slovakia
- Region: Banská Bystrica Region
- District: Krupina District
- First mentioned: 1135

Area
  - Total: 15.20 km^{2} (5.87 sq mi)
- Elevation: 589 m (1,932 ft)

Population (2025)
  - Total: 706
- Time zone: UTC+1 (CET)
  - Summer (DST): UTC+2 (CEST)
- Postal code: 962 43
- Area code: +421 45
- Vehicle registration plate (until 2022): KA
- Website: senohrad.sk

Senohrad (Hungarian: Szénavár) is a village and municipality in the Krupina District of the Banská Bystrica Region of Slovakia.

== Geography ==
The municipality lies at an altitude of 589 metres (1,932 ft) and covers an area of 15.20 km^{2} (5.87 sq mi) (2025).

== Population ==
Population statistic (10 years)
Year	1995	2005	2015	2025
Count	707	774	792	706
Difference		+9.47%	+2.32%	−10.85%

Population statistic
Year	2024	2025
Count	713	706
Difference		−0.98%

It has a population of 706 people (31 December 2025).

=== Ethnicity ===
Census 2021 (1+ %)
Ethnicity	Number	Fraction
Slovak	697	95.74%
Not found out	30	4.12%
Total	728	

In year 2021 was 728 people by ethnicity 697 as Slovak, 30 as Not found out, 2 as Czech, 1 as Romani, 1 as Rusyn and 1 as Polish.

Note on population: The difference values of population numbers in the table "Population statistic" and in the sections "Ethnicity" & "Religion" is caused by the use of various statistical methods.

=== Religion ===
Census 2021 (1+ %)
Religion	Number	Fraction
Roman Catholic Church	622	85.44%
None	43	5.91%
Not found out	33	4.53%
Evangelical Church	16	2.2%
Total	728	

In year 2021 was 728 people by religion 622 from Roman Catholic Church, 43 from None, 33 from Not found out, 16 from Evangelical Church, 4 from Greek Catholic Church, 3 from Other, 2 from Other and not ascertained christian church, 2 from Christian Congregations in Slovakia, 2 from Buddhism and 1 from Ad hoc movements.
