= Súdovce =

Súdovce Szúd
- Municipality
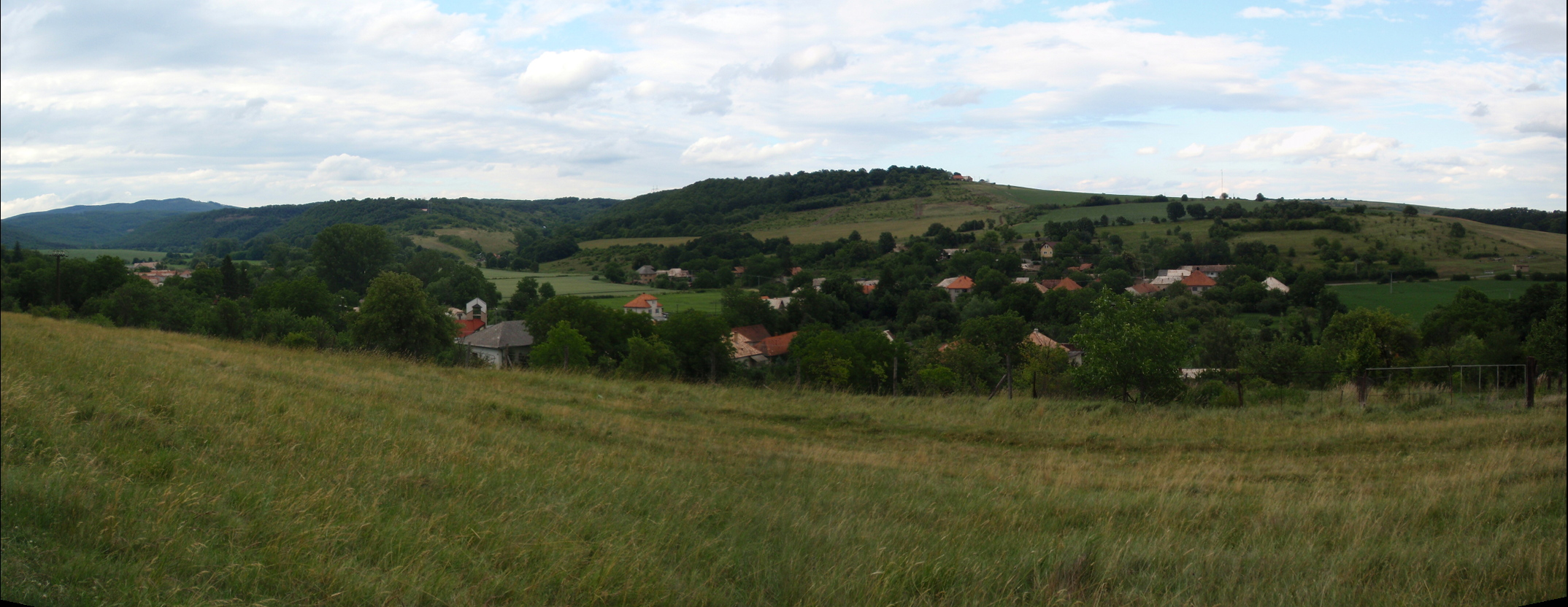

- Flag

- Location of Súdovce in the Banská Bystrica Region Location of Súdovce in Slovakia
- Coordinates: 48.21°N 18.84°E
- Country: Slovakia
- Region: Banská Bystrica Region
- District: Krupina District
- First mentioned: 1244

Area
  - Total: 9.77 km^{2} (3.77 sq mi)
- Elevation: 164 m (538 ft)

Population (2025)
  - Total: 209
- Time zone: UTC+1 (CET)
  - Summer (DST): UTC+2 (CEST)
- Postal code: 962 70
- Area code: +421 45
- Vehicle registration plate (until 2022): KA
- Website: www.obecsudovce.sk

Sudovce (Hungarian: Szúd) is a village and municipality in the Krupina District of the Banská Bystrica Region of Slovakia.

== Geography ==
The municipality lies at an altitude of 164 metres (538 ft) and covers an area of 9.77 km^{2} (3.77 sq mi) (2025).

== Population ==
Population statistic (10 years)
Year	1995	2005	2015	2025
Count	218	202	225	209
Difference		−7.33%	+11.38%	−7.11%

Population statistic
Year	2024	2025
Count	210	209
Difference		−0.47%

It has a population of 209 people (31 December 2025).

=== Ethnicity ===
Census 2021 (1+ %)
Ethnicity	Number	Fraction
Slovak	196	93.77%
Romani	20	9.56%
Not found out	9	4.3%
Total	209	

In year 2021 was 209 people by ethnicity 196 as Slovak, 20 as Romani, 9 as Not found out, 2 as Czech, 1 as Hungarian and 1 as Other.

Note on population: The difference values of population numbers in the table "Population statistic" and in the sections "Ethnicity" & "Religion" is caused by the use of various statistical methods.

=== Religion ===
Census 2021 (1+ %)
Religion	Number	Fraction
Roman Catholic Church	161	77.03%
None	22	10.53%
Evangelical Church	18	8.61%
Not found out	7	3.35%
Total	209	

In year 2021 was 209 people by religion 161 from Roman Catholic Church, 22 from None, 18 from Evangelical Church, 7 from Not found out and 1 from Old Catholic Church.
