= Kráľovce-Krnišov =

Kráľovce-Krnišov Hontkirályfalva
- Municipality
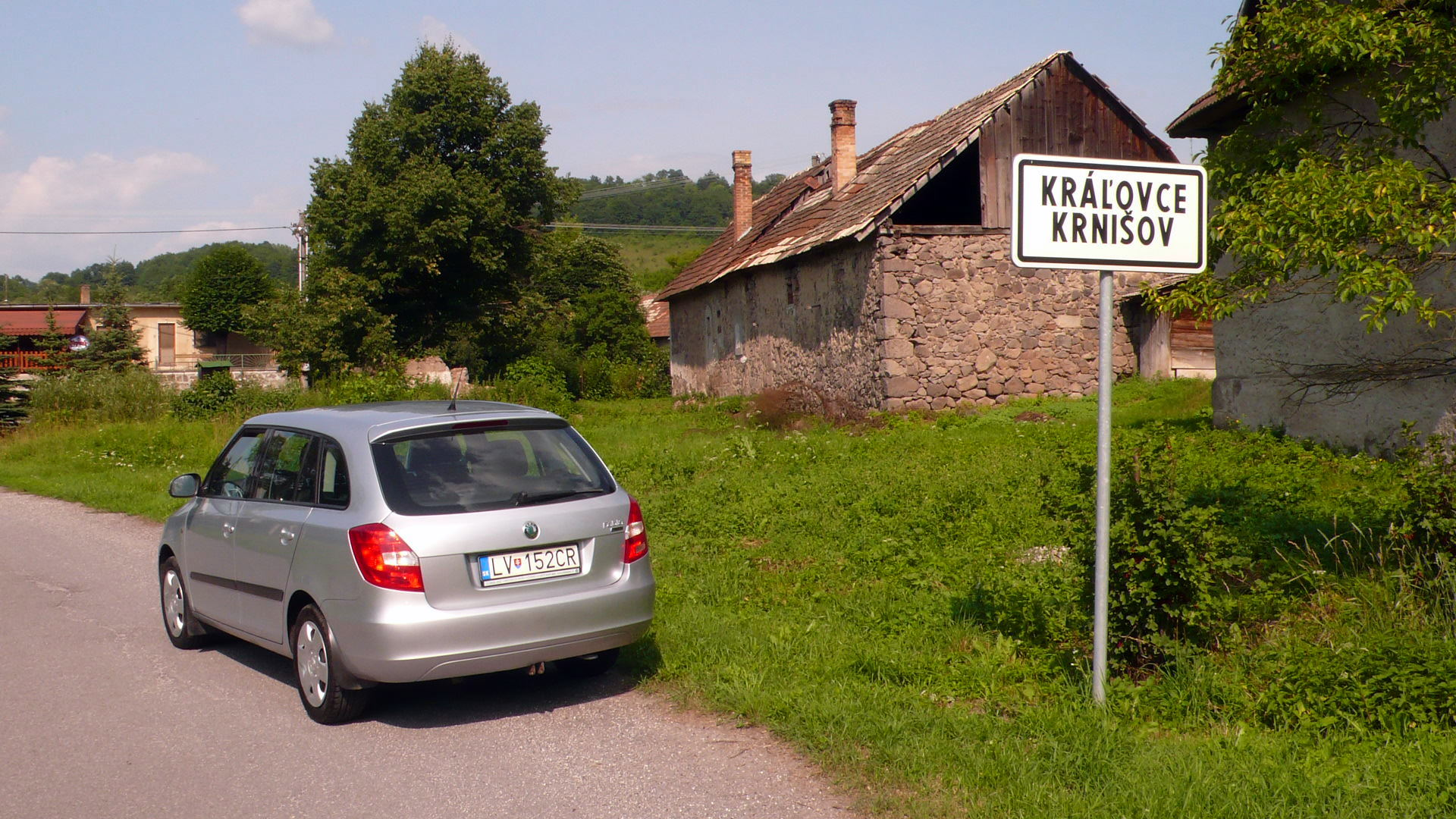

- Flag

- Location of Kráľovce-Krnišov in the Banská Bystrica Region Location of Kráľovce-Krnišov in Slovakia
- Coordinates: 48.35°N 18.98°E
- Country: Slovakia
- Region: Banská Bystrica Region
- District: Krupina District
- First mentioned: 1329

Area
  - Total: 19.95 km^{2} (7.70 sq mi)
- Elevation: 339 m (1,112 ft)

Population (2025)
  - Total: 153
- Time zone: UTC+1 (CET)
  - Summer (DST): UTC+2 (CEST)
- Postal code: 962 65
- Area code: +421 45
- Vehicle registration plate (until 2022): KA
- Website: www.kralovce-krnisov.sk

Kráľovce-Krnišov (Hungarian: Hontkirályfalva) is a village and municipality in the Krupina District of the Banská Bystrica Region of Slovakia.

== Geography ==
The municipality lies at an altitude of 339 metres (1,112 ft) and covers an area of 19.95 km^{2} (7.70 sq mi) (2025).

== Population ==
Population statistic (10 years)
Year	1995	2005	2015	2025
Count	169	154	165	153
Difference		−8.87%	+7.14%	−7.27%

Population statistic
Year	2024	2025
Count	148	153
Difference		+3.37%

It has a population of 153 people (31 December 2025).

=== Ethnicity ===
Census 2021 (1+ %)
Ethnicity	Number	Fraction
Slovak	142	98.61%
Romani	10	6.94%
Russian	4	2.77%
Not found out	2	1.38%
Total	144	

In year 2021 was 144 people by ethnicity 142 as Slovak, 10 as Romani, 4 as Russian, 2 as Not found out, 1 as Italian and 1 as German.

Note on population: The difference values of population numbers in the table "Population statistic" and in the sections "Ethnicity" & "Religion" is caused by the use of various statistical methods.

=== Religion ===
Census 2021 (1+ %)
Religion	Number	Fraction
Roman Catholic Church	55	38.19%
Evangelical Church	50	34.72%
None	34	23.61%
Not found out	2	1.39%
Total	144	

In year 2021 was 144 people by religion 55 from Roman Catholic Church, 50 from Evangelical Church, 34 from None, 2 from Not found out, 1 from Jehovah's Witnesses, 1 from Seventh-day Adventist Church and 1 from Ad hoc movements.
