= Georges Badin =

French poet and painter

- Born: March 13, 1927
- Died: November 23, 2014

Georges Badin (March 13, 1927 – November 23, 2014) was a French poet and painter.

Georges Badin was the curator of the Musée d'Art Moderne de Céret from 1967 to 1986.

== Recent exhibitions ==
- Maison de la Catalanité, Perpignan (2011)
- Galerie Åkern, Kongsberg, Norway (2007)
- Galerie Lucie Weill & Seligmann, Paris (2005, 2006)
- Galerie Berthet Aittouares, Paris (2005, 2006)
- Galerie Nicolas Deman, Paris (2005)
- Galerie Florence Arnaud, Paris (1993, 1997, 1998)
- Galerie Bernard Jordan, Paris (1984, 1985, 1986)
- Galerie L'Arturiale, Liège (1981, 1982, 1983)
