= Dolný Badín =

Dolný Badín Alsóbágyon
- Municipality
- Flag

- Location of Dolný Badín in the Banská Bystrica Region Location of Dolný Badín in Slovakia
- Coordinates: 48.27°N 19.07°E
- Country: Slovakia
- Region: Banská Bystrica Region
- District: Krupina District
- First mentioned: 1135

Area
  - Total: 6.24 km^{2} (2.41 sq mi)
- Elevation: 305 m (1,001 ft)

Population (2025)
  - Total: 250
- Time zone: UTC+1 (CET)
  - Summer (DST): UTC+2 (CEST)
- Postal code: 962 51
- Area code: +421 45
- Vehicle registration plate (until 2022): KA
- Website: www.dolnybadin.sk

Dolný Badín (Hungarian: Alsóbágyon, earlier Alsóbadin) is a village and municipality in the Krupina District of the Banská Bystrica Region of Slovakia.

== Geography ==
The municipality lies at an altitude of 305 metres (1,001 ft) and covers an area of 6.24 km^{2} (2.41 sq mi) (2025).

== History ==
The area of the village has been continuously inhabited by various peoples since the Neolithic period. In historical records, the village was first mentioned in 1135 (1135 Badin, Badun, 1391 Bagyon) when it belonged to Bzovík Castle.

== Population ==
Population statistic (10 years)
Year	1995	2005	2015	2025
Count	263	253	253	250
Difference		−3.80%	+1.42%	−1.18%

Population statistic
Year	2024	2025
Count	253	250
Difference		−1.18%

It has a population of 250 people (31 December 2025).

=== Ethnicity ===
Census 2021 (1+ %)
Ethnicity	Number	Fraction
Slovak	248	99.2%
Total	250	

In year 2021 was 250 people by ethnicity 248 as Slovak, 1 as Czech and 1 as Romani.

Note on population: The difference values of population numbers in the table "Population statistic" and in the sections "Ethnicity" & "Religion" is caused by the use of various statistical methods.

=== Religion ===
Census 2021 (1+ %)
Religion	Number	Fraction
Roman Catholic Church	224	89.6%
None	11	4.4%
Evangelical Church	8	3.2%
Other and not ascertained christian church	4	1.6%
Total	250	

In year 2021 was 250 people by religion 224 from Roman Catholic Church, 11 from None, 8 from Evangelical Church, 4 from Other and not ascertained christian church, 2 from Greek Catholic Church and 1 from Ad hoc movements.

== Genealogical resources ==
The records for genealogical research are available at the state archive "Statny Archiv in Banska Bystrica, Slovakia"

- Roman Catholic church records (births/marriages/deaths): 1800-1895 (parish A)
- Lutheran church records (births/marriages/deaths): 1786-1895 (parish B)

== See also ==
- List of municipalities and towns in Slovakia
