= Medovarce =

Medovarce Méznevelő
- Municipality
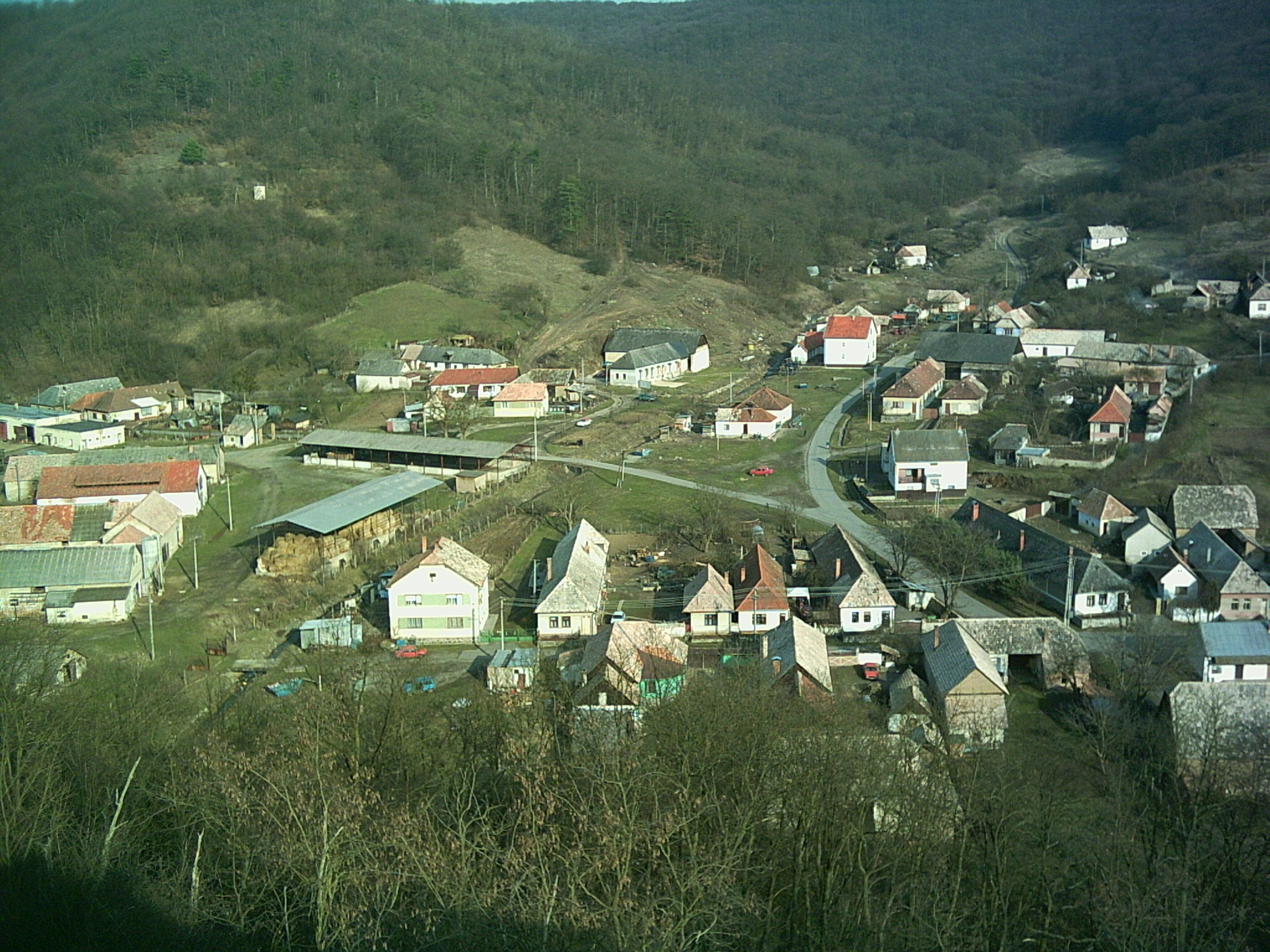

- Flag

- Location of Medovarce in the Banská Bystrica Region Location of Medovarce in Slovakia
- Coordinates: 48.23°N 19.00°E
- Country: Slovakia
- Region: Banská Bystrica Region
- District: Krupina District
- First mentioned: 1156

Area
  - Total: 13.23 km^{2} (5.11 sq mi)
- Elevation: 180 m (590 ft)

Population (2025)
  - Total: 214
- Time zone: UTC+1 (CET)
  - Summer (DST): UTC+2 (CEST)
- Postal code: 962 55
- Area code: +421 45
- Vehicle registration plate (until 2022): KA
- Website: www.medovarce.sk

Medovarce (Hungarian: Méznevelő) is a village and municipality in the Krupina District of the Banská Bystrica Region of Slovakia.

== Geography ==
The municipality lies at an altitude of 180 metres (590 ft) and covers an area of 13.23 km^{2} (5.11 sq mi) (2025).

== Population ==
Population statistic (10 years)
Year	1995	2005	2015	2025
Count	242	251	233	214
Difference		+3.71%	−7.17%	−8.15%

Population statistic
Year	2024	2025
Count	218	214
Difference		−1.83%

It has a population of 214 people (31 December 2025).

=== Ethnicity ===
Census 2021 (1+ %)
Ethnicity	Number	Fraction
Slovak	210	98.59%
Romani	4	1.87%
Total	213	

In year 2021 was 213 people by ethnicity 210 as Slovak, 4 as Romani, 2 as Hungarian, 1 as Czech and 1 as Not found out.

Note on population: The difference values of population numbers in the table "Population statistic" and in the sections "Ethnicity" & "Religion" is caused by the use of various statistical methods.

=== Religion ===
Census 2021 (1+ %)
Religion	Number	Fraction
Roman Catholic Church	160	75.12%
Evangelical Church	35	16.43%
None	14	6.57%
Not found out	3	1.41%
Total	213	

In year 2021 was 213 people by religion 160 from Roman Catholic Church, 35 from Evangelical Church, 14 from None, 3 from Not found out and 1 from Greek Catholic Church.
