= Horný Badín =

Horný Badín Felsőbágyon
- Municipality
- Flag

- Location of Horný Badín in the Banská Bystrica Region Location of Horný Badín in Slovakia
- Coordinates: 48.28°N 19.08°E
- Country: Slovakia
- Region: Banská Bystrica Region
- District: Krupina District
- First mentioned: 1391

Area
  - Total: 5.62 km^{2} (2.17 sq mi)
- Elevation: 311 m (1,020 ft)

Population (2025)
  - Total: 169
- Time zone: UTC+1 (CET)
  - Summer (DST): UTC+2 (CEST)
- Postal code: 962 51
- Area code: +421 45
- Vehicle registration plate (until 2022): KA
- Website: www.hornybadin.dcom.sk

Horný Badín (Hungarian: Felsőbágyon) is a village and municipality in the Krupina District of the Banská Bystrica Region of Slovakia.

== Geography ==
The municipality lies at an altitude of 311 metres (1,020 ft) and covers an area of 5.62 km^{2} (2.17 sq mi) (2025).

== Population ==
Population statistic (10 years)
| Year | 1995 | 2005 | 2015 | 2025 |
|---|---|---|---|---|
| Count | 195 | 191 | 179 | 169 |
| Difference | | −2.05% | −6.28% | −5.58% |

Population statistic
| Year | 2024 | 2025 |
|---|---|---|
| Count | 172 | 169 |
| Difference | | −1.74% |

It has a population of 169 people (31 December 2025).

=== Ethnicity ===
Census 2021 (1+ %)
| Ethnicity | Number | Fraction |
|---|---|---|
| Slovak | 174 | 98.3% |
| Not found out | 2 | 1.12% |
| Hungarian | 2 | 1.12% |
| Total | 177 | |

In year 2021 was 177 people by ethnicity 174 as Slovak, 2 as Not found out, 2 as Hungarian and 1 as Romani.

Note on population: The difference values of population numbers in the table "Population statistic" and in the sections "Ethnicity" & "Religion" is caused by the use of various statistical methods.

=== Religion ===
Census 2021 (1+ %)
| Religion | Number | Fraction |
|---|---|---|
| Roman Catholic Church | 152 | 85.88% |
| None | 14 | 7.91% |
| Evangelical Church | 8 | 4.52% |
| Not found out | 2 | 1.13% |
| Total | 177 | |

In year 2021 was 177 people by religion 152 from Roman Catholic Church, 14 from None, 8 from Evangelical Church, 2 from Not found out and 1 from Greek Catholic Church.

== Genealogical resources ==
The records for genealogical research are available at the state archive "Statny Archiv in Banska Bystrica, Slovakia"

- Roman Catholic church records (births/marriages/deaths): 1800-1895 (parish B)
- Lutheran church records (births/marriages/deaths): 1786-1895 (parish B)

== See also ==
- List of municipalities and towns in Slovakia
