= Litava, Krupina District =

Litava Litva
- Municipality
- Flag

- Location of Litava in the Banská Bystrica Region Location of Litava in Slovakia
- Coordinates: 48°17′56″N 19°10′46″E
- Country: Slovakia
- Region: Banská Bystrica Region
- District: Krupina District
- First mentioned: 1135

Government
  - Mayor: Ľubica Tuhárska

Area
  - Total: 22.12 km^{2} (8.54 sq mi)
- Elevation: 430 m (1,410 ft)

Population (2025)
  - Total: 742
- Time zone: UTC+1 (CET)
  - Summer (DST): UTC+2 (CEST)
- Postal code: 962 44
- Area code: +421 45
- Vehicle registration plate (until 2022): KA
- Website: www.obeclitava.sk

Litava (Hungarian: Litva) is a village and municipality in the Krupina District of the Banská Bystrica Region of Slovakia.

== History ==
The village was mentioned for the first time in a document from 1135. Already in this year a Romanesque chapel was present in the village. With the presence of this church, the village served as a kind of spiritual, cultural and social center of the region since the 12th century. In the 15th century Litava was a tolling point. In 1496 already the village had its own mill. In 1613 a wooden school stood in the middle of the village which was rebuilt into a brick school in 1811.

== Population ==
Population statistic (10 years)
Year	1995	2005	2015	2025
Count	819	799	767	742
Difference		−2.44%	−4.00%	−3.25%

Population statistic
Year	2024	2025
Count	727	742
Difference		+2.06%

It has a population of 742 people (31 December 2025).

=== Ethnicity ===
Census 2021 (1+ %)
Ethnicity	Number	Fraction
Slovak	746	98.93%
Romani	77	10.21%
Not found out	11	1.45%
Total	754	

In year 2021 was 754 people by ethnicity 746 as Slovak, 77 as Romani, 11 as Not found out, 1 as Czech, 1 as Russian and 1 as Polish.

Note on population: The difference values of population numbers in the table "Population statistic" and in the sections "Ethnicity" & "Religion" is caused by the use of various statistical methods.

=== Religion ===
Census 2021 (1+ %)
Religion	Number	Fraction
Roman Catholic Church	679	90.05%
None	49	6.5%
Evangelical Church	13	1.72%
Total	754	

In year 2021 was 754 people by religion 679 from Roman Catholic Church, 49 from None, 13 from Evangelical Church, 6 from Not found out, 3 from Old Catholic Church, 1 from Paganism and natural spirituality, 1 from Christian Congregations in Slovakia, 1 from Hinduism and 1 from Ad hoc movements.
