= Drienovo =

Drienovo Csábrágsomos
- Municipality
- Flag

- Location of Drienovo in the Banská Bystrica Region Location of Drienovo in Slovakia
- Coordinates: 48.23°N 19.07°E
- Country: Slovakia
- Region: Banská Bystrica Region
- District: Krupina District
- First mentioned: 1256

Area
  - Total: 15.32 km^{2} (5.92 sq mi)
- Elevation: 363 m (1,191 ft)

Population (2025)
  - Total: 94
- Time zone: UTC+1 (CET)
  - Summer (DST): UTC+2 (CEST)
- Postal code: 962 51
- Area code: +421 45
- Vehicle registration plate (until 2022): KA
- Website: www.drienovo.dcom.sk

Drienovo (Hungarian: Csábrágsomos) is a village and municipality in the Krupina District of the Banská Bystrica Region of Slovakia.

== Geography ==
The municipality lies at an altitude of 363 metres (1,191 ft) and covers an area of 15.32 km^{2} (5.92 sq mi) (2025).

== History ==
In historical records, the village was first mentioned in 1256 (Drino) when it belonged to Čabraď Castle. After, in the order, it passed to families Bakócy (16th century), Erdődy, Pálffy, Krusics (Krupina’s Captains), Koháry and Coburg.

== Population ==
Population statistic (10 years)
Year	1995	2005	2015	2025
Count	123	127	110	94
Difference		+3.25%	−13.38%	−14.54%

Population statistic
Year	2024	2025
Count	97	94
Difference		−3.09%

It has a population of 94 people (31 December 2025).

=== Ethnicity ===
Census 2021 (1+ %)
Ethnicity	Number	Fraction
Slovak	107	100%
Total	107	

In year 2021 was 107 people by ethnicity 107 as Slovak, 1 as Czech, 1 as Romani, 1 as Austrian and 1 as Hungarian.

Note on population: The difference values of population numbers in the table "Population statistic" and in the sections "Ethnicity" & "Religion" is caused by the use of various statistical methods.

=== Religion ===
Census 2021 (1+ %)
Religion	Number	Fraction
Roman Catholic Church	50	46.73%
Evangelical Church	50	46.73%
None	5	4.67%
Total	107	

In year 2021 was 107 people by religion 50 from Roman Catholic Church, 50 from Evangelical Church, 5 from None, 1 from Calvinist Church and 1 from Not found out.

== Genealogical resources ==
The records for genealogical research are available at the state archive "Statny Archiv in Banska Bystrica, Nitra, Slovakia"

- Roman Catholic church records (births/marriages/deaths): 1800-1895 (parish B)
- Lutheran church records (births/marriages/deaths): 1728-1896 (parish A)

== See also ==
- List of municipalities and towns in Slovakia
