= Hontianske Tesáre =

Hontianske Tesáre Teszér
- Municipality
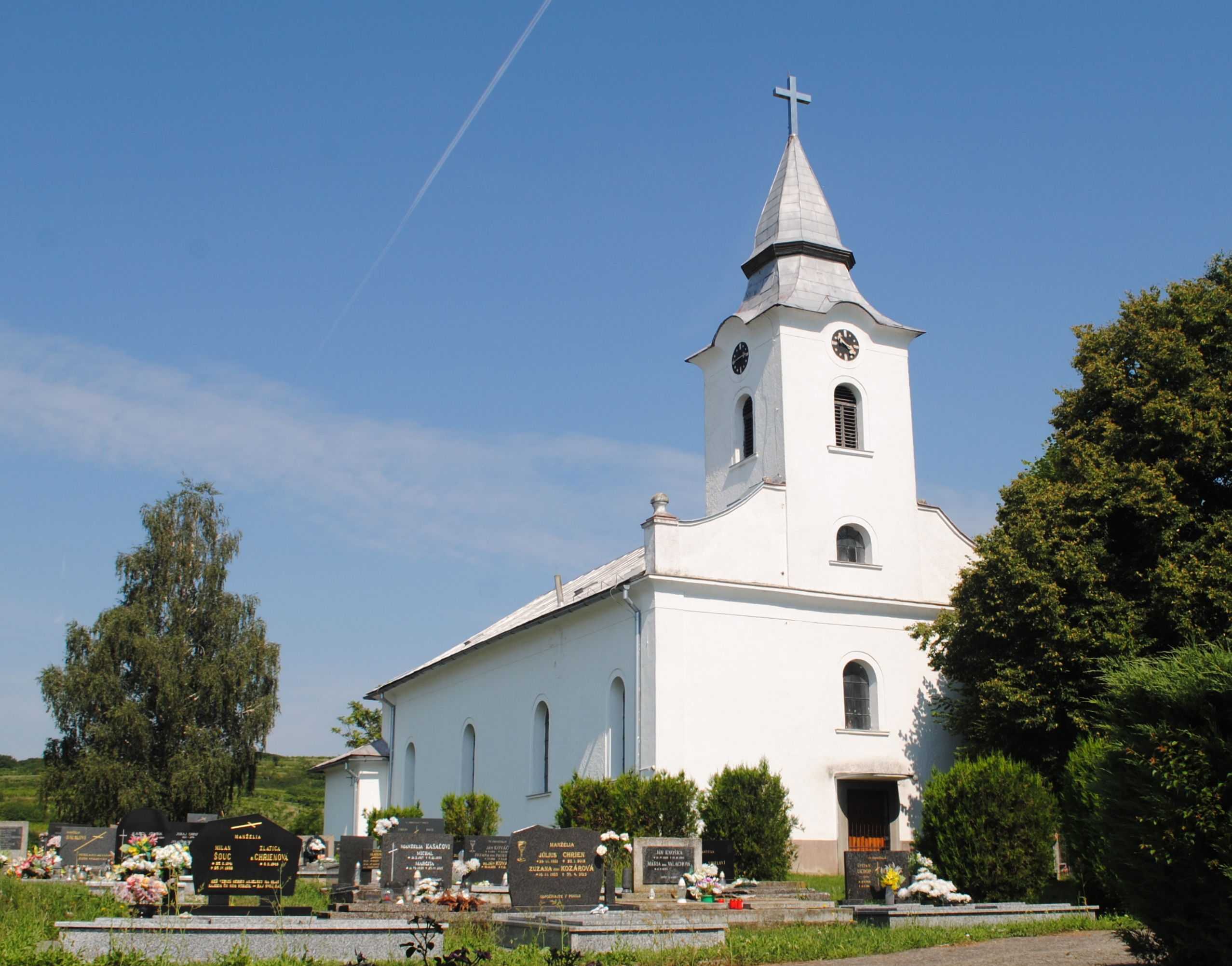

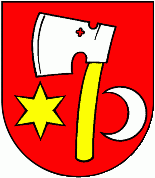
- Flag Coat of arms

- Location of Hontianske Tesáre in the Banská Bystrica Region Location of Hontianske Tesáre in Slovakia
- Coordinates: 48.20°N 18.92°E
- Country: Slovakia
- Region: Banská Bystrica Region
- District: Krupina District
- First mentioned: 1279

Area
  - Total: 33.11 km^{2} (12.78 sq mi)
- Elevation: 162 m (531 ft)

Population (2025)
  - Total: 854
- Time zone: UTC+1 (CET)
  - Summer (DST): UTC+2 (CEST)
- Postal code: 962 68
- Area code: +421 45
- Vehicle registration plate (until 2022): KA
- Website: www.hontiansketesare.sk

Hontianske Tesáre (Hungarian: Teszér) is a village and municipality in the Krupina District of the Banská Bystrica Region of Slovakia.

== Geography ==
The municipality lies at an altitude of 162 metres (531 ft) and covers an area of 33.11 km^{2} (12.78 sq mi) (2025).

== Population ==
Population statistic (10 years)
Year	1995	2005	2015	2025
Count	823	892	941	854
Difference		+8.38%	+5.49%	−9.24%

Population statistic
Year	2024	2025
Count	868	854
Difference		−1.61%

It has a population of 854 people (31 December 2025).

=== Ethnicity ===
Census 2021 (1+ %)
Ethnicity	Number	Fraction
Slovak	847	95.27%
Romani	101	11.36%
Not found out	44	4.94%
Total	889	

In year 2021 was 889 people by ethnicity 847 as Slovak, 101 as Romani, 44 as Not found out, 6 as Czech, 4 as Other, 4 as English, 1 as Russian, 1 as German and 1 as Hungarian.

Note on population: The difference values of population numbers in the table "Population statistic" and in the sections "Ethnicity" & "Religion" is caused by the use of various statistical methods.

=== Religion ===
Census 2021 (1+ %)
Religion	Number	Fraction
Roman Catholic Church	545	61.3%
Evangelical Church	162	18.22%
None	135	15.19%
Not found out	36	4.05%
Total	889	

In year 2021 was 889 people by religion 545 from Roman Catholic Church, 162 from Evangelical Church, 135 from None, 36 from Not found out, 3 from Greek Catholic Church, 2 from Christian Congregations in Slovakia, 2 from Ad hoc movements, 1 from Islam, 1 from Other, 1 from Buddhism and 1 from Apostolic Church.

== Genealogical resources ==
The records for genealogical research are available at the state archive "Statny Archiv in Banska Bystrica, Slovakia"

- Roman Catholic church records (births/marriages/deaths): 1760-1897 (parish B)
- Lutheran church records (births/marriages/deaths): 1702-1902 (parish A)

== See also ==
- List of municipalities and towns in Slovakia
