= Drážovce, Krupina District =

Drážovce Darázsi
- Municipality
- Flag

- Location of Drážovce in the Banská Bystrica Region Location of Drážovce in Slovakia
- Coordinates: 48°15′N 18°55′E
- Country: Slovakia
- Region: Banská Bystrica Region
- District: Krupina District
- First mentioned: 1135

Area
  - Total: 8.02 km^{2} (3.10 sq mi)
- Elevation: 199 m (653 ft)

Population (2025)
  - Total: 114
- Time zone: UTC+1 (CET)
  - Summer (DST): UTC+2 (CEST)
- Postal code: 962 67
- Area code: +421 45
- Vehicle registration plate (until 2022): KA
- Website: www.obecdrazovce.sk

Drážovce (German: Dahowitz; Hungarian: Darázsi) is a village and municipality in the Krupina District of the Banská Bystrica Region of Slovakia.

== History ==
The village is first mentioned in Bzovík abbey's list in 1135 (1135 Dras, 1286 Daras, 1349 Darassy, 1394 Vduarnokdaras, 1511 Daras utraque). It belonged to Hont Castle. In 1296 it was given to a certain Arnold from Banská Štiavnica, and from the 16th century it changed many owners: the local feudatory family Dárázsy, Dalmady, Jessenszky (18th century), Radvanszky and Sembery (another local family).

== Population ==
Population statistic (10 years)
Year	1995	2005	2015	2025
Count	134	115	140	114
Difference		−14.17%	+21.73%	−18.57%

Population statistic
Year	2024	2025
Count	117	114
Difference		−2.56%

It has a population of 114 people (31 December 2025).

=== Ethnicity ===
Census 2021 (1+ %)
Ethnicity	Number	Fraction
Slovak	113	94.95%
Romani	5	4.2%
Not found out	2	1.68%
Hungarian	2	1.68%
Total	119	

In year 2021 was 119 people by ethnicity 113 as Slovak, 5 as Romani, 2 as Not found out, 2 as Hungarian and 1 as Jewish.

Note on population: The difference values of population numbers in the table "Population statistic" and in the sections "Ethnicity" & "Religion" is caused by the use of various statistical methods.

=== Religion ===
Census 2021 (1+ %)
Religion	Number	Fraction
Roman Catholic Church	54	45.38%
Evangelical Church	41	34.45%
None	19	15.97%
Not found out	2	1.68%
Total	119	

In year 2021 was 119 people by religion 54 from Roman Catholic Church, 41 from Evangelical Church, 19 from None, 2 from Not found out, 1 from Old Catholic Church, 1 from Greek Catholic Church and 1 from Buddhism.

== Genealogical resources ==
The records for genealogical research are available at the state archive "Statny Archiv in Banska Bystrica, Slovakia"

- Roman Catholic church records (births/marriages/deaths): 1760-1897 (parish B)
- Lutheran church records (births/marriages/deaths): 1730-1896 (parish A)

== See also ==
- List of municipalities and towns in Slovakia
