= Hontianske Nemce =

Hontianske Nemce Hontnémeti
- Municipality
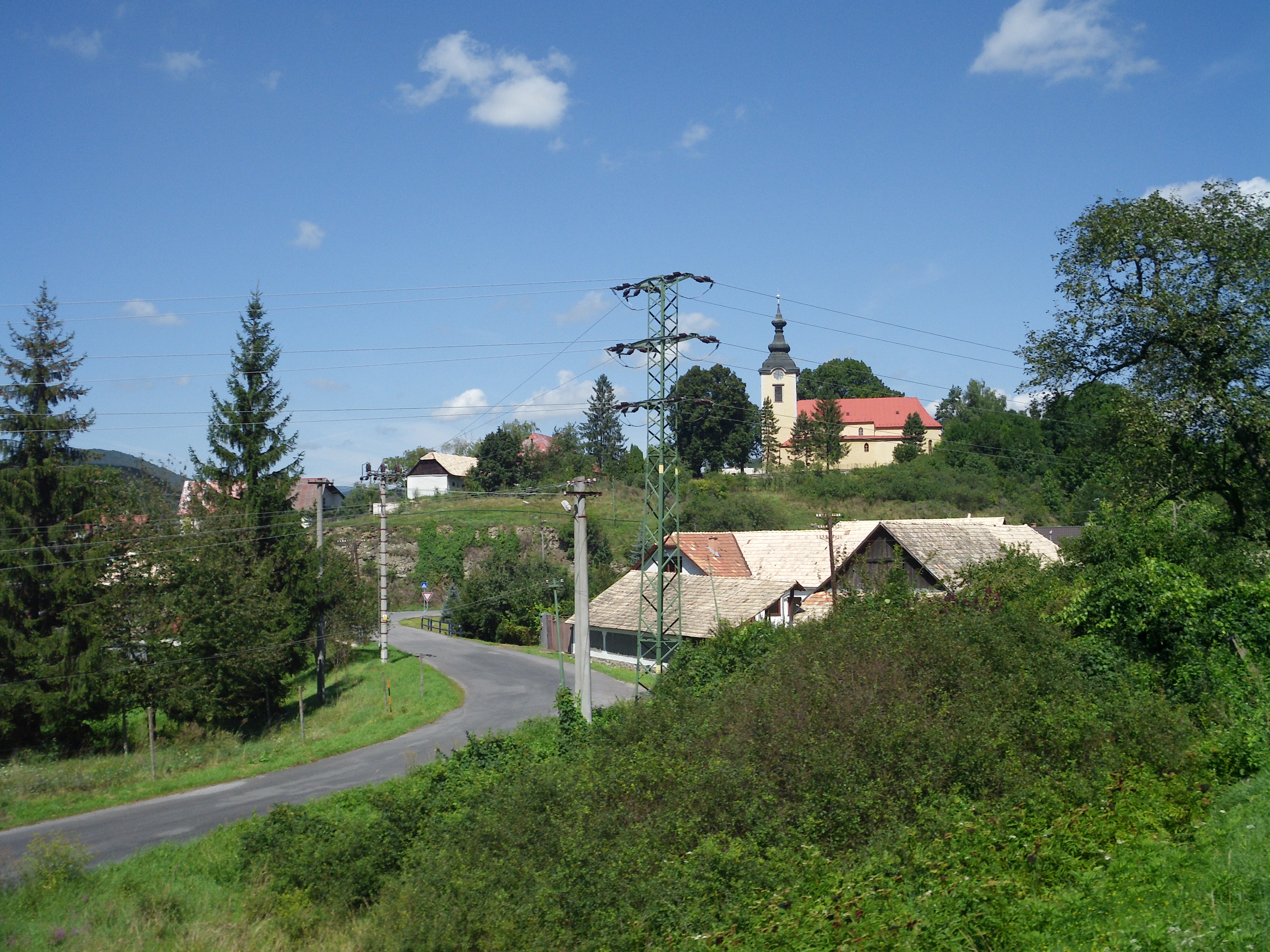

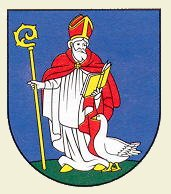
- Flag Coat of arms

- Location of Hontianske Nemce in the Banská Bystrica Region Location of Hontianske Nemce in Slovakia
- Coordinates: 48.28°N 19.00°E
- Country: Slovakia
- Region: Banská Bystrica Region
- District: Krupina District
- First mentioned: 1256

Area
  - Total: 30.84 km^{2} (11.91 sq mi)
- Elevation: 259 m (850 ft)

Population (2025)
  - Total: 1,365
- Time zone: UTC+1 (CET)
  - Summer (DST): UTC+2 (CEST)
- Postal code: 962 65
- Area code: +421 45
- Vehicle registration plate (until 2022): KA
- Website: www.hontianskenemce.sk

Hontianske Nemce (Hungarian: Hontnémeti) is a village and municipality in the Krupina District of the Banská Bystrica Region of Slovakia.

== Geography ==
The municipality lies at an altitude of 259 metres (850 ft) and covers an area of 30.84 km^{2} (11.91 sq mi) (2025).

== Population ==
Population statistic (10 years)
| Year | 1995 | 2005 | 2015 | 2025 |
|---|---|---|---|---|
| Count | 1533 | 1499 | 1500 | 1365 |
| Difference | | −2.21% | +0.06% | −9% |

Population statistic
| Year | 2024 | 2025 |
|---|---|---|
| Count | 1374 | 1365 |
| Difference | | −0.65% |

It has a population of 1365 people (31 December 2025).

=== Ethnicity ===
Census 2021 (1+ %)
| Ethnicity | Number | Fraction |
|---|---|---|
| Slovak | 1359 | 95.43% |
| Not found out | 52 | 3.65% |
| Total | 1424 | |

In year 2021 was 1424 people by ethnicity 1359 as Slovak, 52 as Not found out, 14 as Romani, 6 as Italian, 6 as Romanian, 3 as Czech, 2 as Other, 1 as Vietnamese, 1 as Serbian, 1 as Polish, 1 as Hungarian, 1 as Greek and 1 as English.

Note on population: The difference values of population numbers in the table "Population statistic" and in the sections "Ethnicity" & "Religion" is caused by the use of various statistical methods.

=== Religion ===
Census 2021 (1+ %)
| Religion | Number | Fraction |
|---|---|---|
| Roman Catholic Church | 1098 | 77.11% |
| None | 165 | 11.59% |
| Evangelical Church | 78 | 5.48% |
| Not found out | 64 | 4.49% |
| Total | 1424 | |

In year 2021 was 1424 people by religion 1098 from Roman Catholic Church, 165 from None, 78 from Evangelical Church, 64 from Not found out, 6 from Greek Catholic Church, 5 from Calvinist Church, 2 from Buddhism, 2 from Ad hoc movements, 1 from Paganism and natural spirituality, 1 from Christian Congregations in Slovakia, 1 from Other and 1 from Apostolic Church.

== Notable people ==
- Marián Labuda, Slovak actor
- Gustáv Valach, Slovak actor

== Genealogical resources ==
The records for genealogical research are available at the state archive "Statny Archiv in Banska Bystrica, Slovakia"

- Lutheran church records (births/marriages/deaths): 1786-1895 (parish B)

== See also ==
- List of municipalities and towns in Slovakia
