= Trpín, Krupina District =

Trpín Terpény
- Municipality
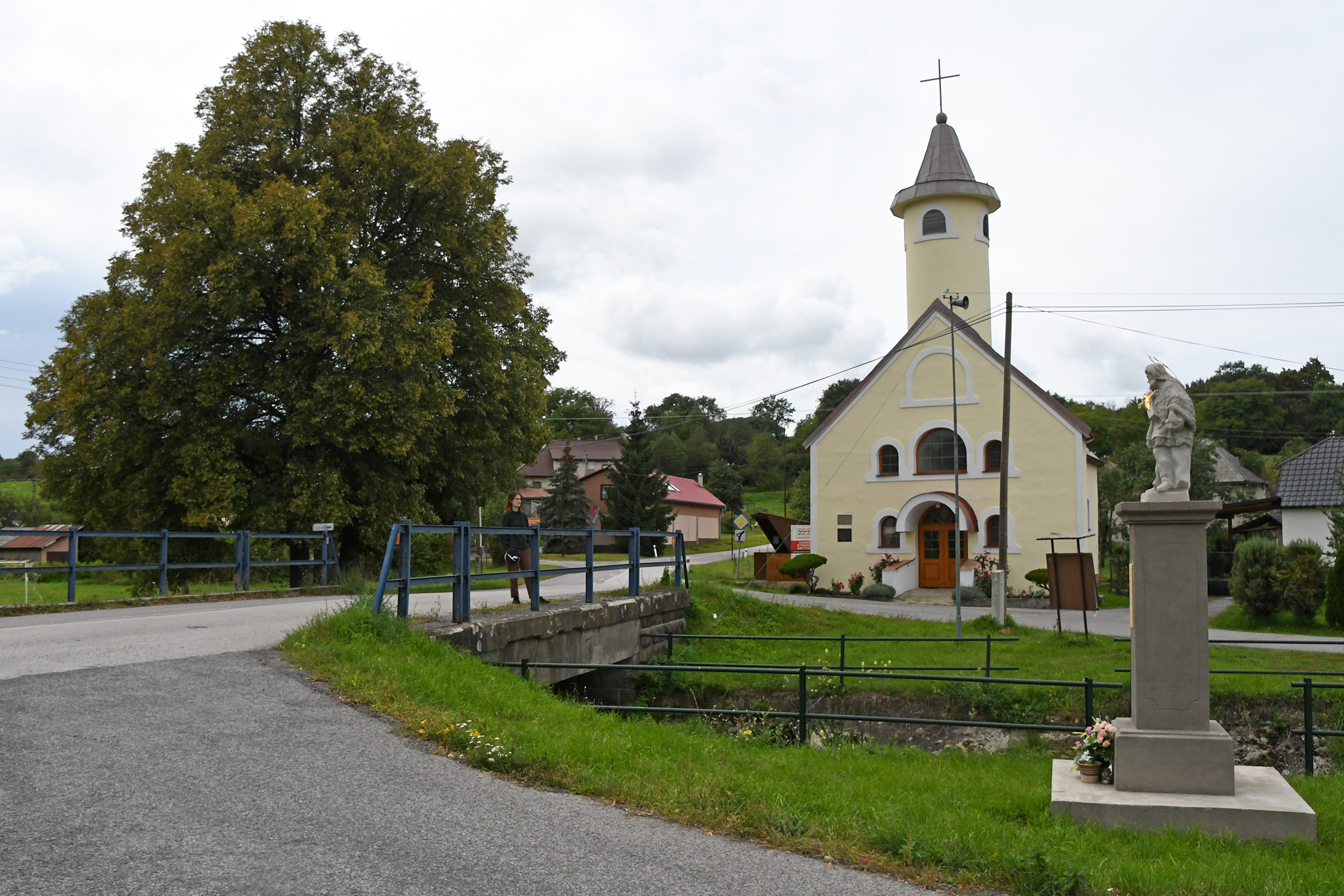

- Flag

- Location of Trpín in the Banská Bystrica Region Location of Trpín in Slovakia
- Coordinates: 48°17′45″N 19°08′20″E
- Country: Slovakia
- Region: Banská Bystrica Region
- District: Krupina District
- First mentioned: 1135

Area
  - Total: 6.35 km^{2} (2.45 sq mi)
- Elevation: 390 m (1,280 ft)

Population (2025)
  - Total: 116
- Time zone: UTC+1 (CET)
  - Summer (DST): UTC+2 (CEST)
- Postal code: 962 44
- Area code: +421 45
- Vehicle registration plate (until 2022): KA
- Website: www.trpin.sk/index.php

Trpín (Hungarian: Terpény) is a village and municipality in the Krupina District of the Banská Bystrica Region of Slovakia.

== Population ==
Population statistic (10 years)
Year	1995	2005	2015	2025
Count	135	111	116	116
Difference		−17.77%	+4.50%	+0%

Population statistic
Year	2024	2025
Count	106	116
Difference		+9.43%

It has a population of 116 people (31 December 2025).

=== Ethnicity ===
Census 2021 (1+ %)
Ethnicity	Number	Fraction
Slovak	101	94.39%
Not found out	7	6.54%
Total	107	

In year 2021 was 107 people by ethnicity 101 as Slovak and 7 as Not found out.

Note on population: The difference values of population numbers in the table "Population statistic" and in the sections "Ethnicity" & "Religion" is caused by the use of various statistical methods.

=== Religion ===
Census 2021 (1+ %)
Religion	Number	Fraction
Roman Catholic Church	76	71.03%
None	15	14.02%
Not found out	7	6.54%
Buddhism	5	4.67%
Greek Catholic Church	3	2.8%
Total	107	

In year 2021 was 107 people by religion 76 from Roman Catholic Church, 15 from None, 7 from Not found out, 5 from Buddhism, 3 from Greek Catholic Church and 1 from Ad hoc movements.
