= Seňa =

Seňa Abaújszina
- Municipality
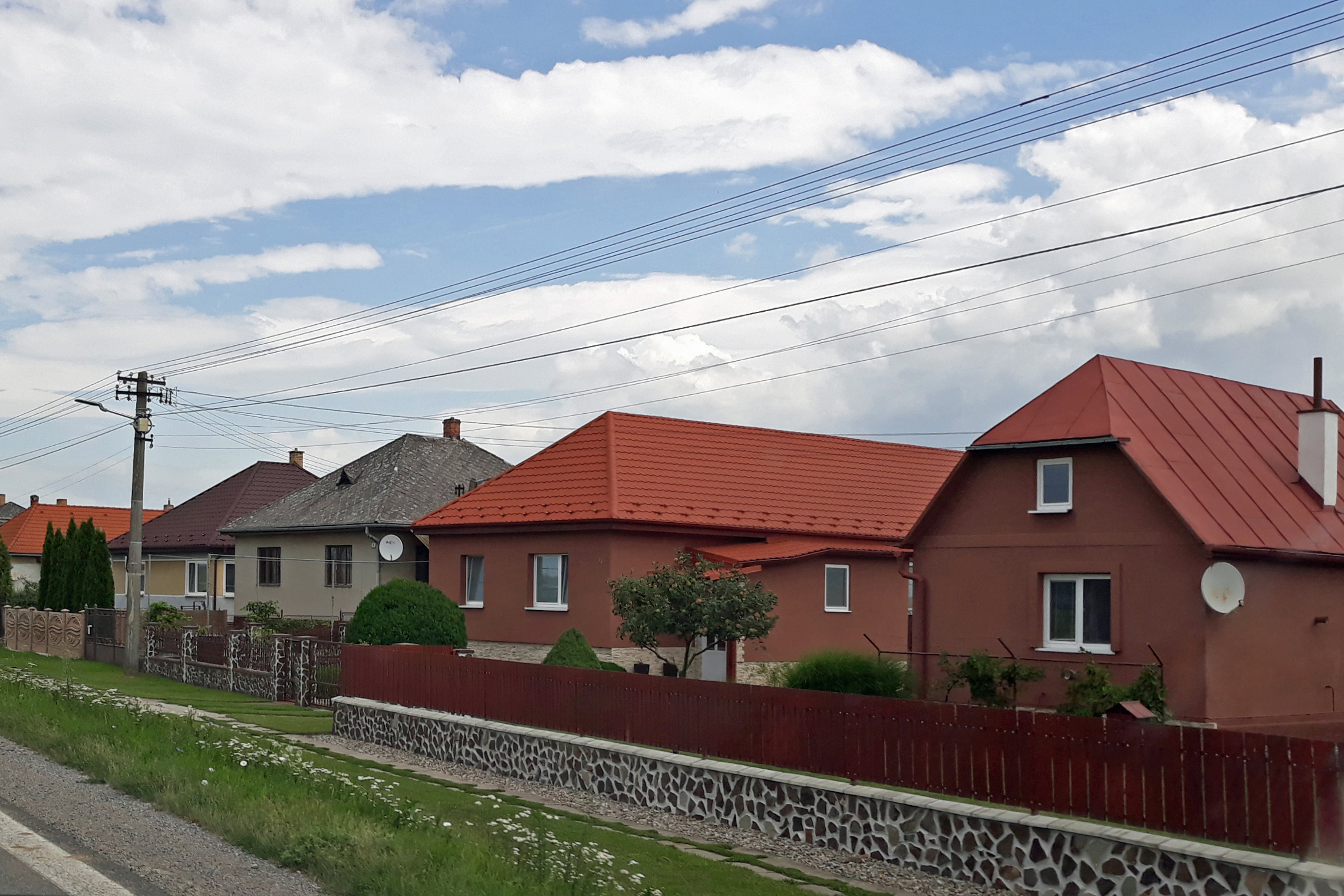

- Flag

- Location of Seňa in the Košice Region Location of Seňa in Slovakia
- Coordinates: 48.57°N 21.27°E
- Country: Slovakia
- Region: Košice Region
- District: Košice-okolie District
- First mentioned: 1249

Area
  - Total: 22.48 km^{2} (8.68 sq mi)
- Elevation: 184 m (604 ft)

Population (2025)
  - Total: 2,239
- Time zone: UTC+1 (CET)
  - Summer (DST): UTC+2 (CEST)
- Postal code: 445 8
- Area code: +421 55
- Vehicle registration plate (until 2022): KS
- Website: obecsena.sk

Seňa (Hungarian: Abaújszina) (1249 Schena, 1251 Scyna, Zyna, 1255 Scynna, 1402 Czena) is a village and municipality in Košice-okolie District in the Košice Region of eastern Slovakia.

== Geography ==
The municipality lies at an altitude of 184 metres (604 ft) and covers an area of 22.48 km^{2} (8.68 sq mi) (2025).

== Etymology ==
According to István Kniezsa, the name is of Slavic origin, but he did not clarified its etymology. Ján Stanislav suggested Slovak/Slavic Seňa and associated it with Serbo-Croatian names Senj, Senje and Polish Sienino. Branislav Varsik suggested Slavic personal name Seňa used not only among early Slovaks, but known also from the territories of present-day Czech Republic, Serbia and Croatia.

The Hungarian form Szina is probably the same phonetic adaptation (e → i) which is documented also for Senné, Veľký Krtíš District (Senná, in medieval documents also as Scinna, Zynna).

== History ==
In historical records the village was first mentioned in 1249 (Schena) when King Béla IV installed here German free colonists from Košice (hospites de Cassovia). The village, being an important marketplace, passed to Čaňa village in 1255 and in 1402 to local Lord Miklos Perényi as a royal donation. Ján Jiskra gave the village to Košice.

In 1567 the village was destroyed by Turks. In 1528 Ferdinand I of Habsburg defeated in battle the army condottiere Ján Zapolyai. In 1652 it was burned again by Turks. In the 17th century it passed to the Rozgonyi and Báthory noble families.

Before World War II, there was a large Jewish community of about 136 Jews. Most of the Jews in the community were murdered by the Nazis in The Holocaust.

== Population ==
Population statistic (10 years)
Year	1995	2005	2015	2025
Count	1918	2128	2130	2239
Difference		+10.94%	+0.09%	+5.11%

Population statistic
Year	2024	2025
Count	2228	2239
Difference		+0.49%

It has a population of 2239 people (31 December 2025).

=== Ethnicity ===
Census 2021 (1+ %)
Ethnicity	Number	Fraction
Slovak	1893	87.23%
Hungarian	220	10.13%
Romani	113	5.2%
Not found out	73	3.36%
Total	2170	

In year 2021 was 2170 people by ethnicity 1893 as Slovak, 220 as Hungarian, 113 as Romani, 73 as Not found out, 13 as Czech, 8 as Ukrainian, 7 as Rusyn, 5 as Other, 1 as Moravian and 1 as Albanian.

Note on population: The difference values of population numbers in the table "Population statistic" and in the sections "Ethnicity" & "Religion" is caused by the use of various statistical methods.

=== Religion ===
Census 2021 (1+ %)
Religion	Number	Fraction
Roman Catholic Church	1339	61.71%
None	342	15.76%
Calvinist Church	244	11.24%
Greek Catholic Church	90	4.15%
Not found out	88	4.06%
Evangelical Church	28	1.29%
Total	2170	

In year 2021 was 2170 people by religion 1339 from Roman Catholic Church, 342 from None, 244 from Calvinist Church, 90 from Greek Catholic Church, 88 from Not found out, 28 from Evangelical Church, 15 from Jehovah's Witnesses, 12 from Eastern Orthodox Church, 4 from Other, 2 from Other and not ascertained christian church, 2 from Ad hoc movements, 1 from Christian Congregations in Slovakia, 1 from United Methodist Church, 1 from Buddhism and 1 from Apostolic Church.

== Culture ==
Birthplace of Andreas Jaszlinszky.
