= Žitný ostrov =

Island in Slovakia

Coordinates: 47°57′N 17°39′E

Location of Žitný ostrov within Slovakia

Žitný ostrov (lit. 'Rye Island'), also called Veľký Žitný ostrov (lit. 'Great Rye Island'; German: Große Schüttinsel, lit. 'Great Schütt Island', Hungarian: Csallóköz) to differentiate it from Malý Žitný ostrov (lit. 'Small Rye Island'; German: Kleine Schüttinsel, lit. 'Little Schütt Island'; Hungarian: Szigetköz), is a river island in southwestern Slovakia, extending from Bratislava to Komárno. It lies between the Danube, its tributary Little Danube and Váh. The island is a major part of the Danubian Flat. It is the biggest river island in Europe, with an area of 1,900 km^{2} (730 sq mi), measuring 84 km (52 mi) in length and 15 to 30 km (9 to 19 mi) in width.

The main towns on the island are Komárno, Dunajská Streda and Šamorín. Three boroughs of Bratislava, Podunajské Biskupice (whole), Vrakuňa and Ružinov (partial), are also located on the island. The Slovnaft refinery is also located on the island. The island is the biggest drinking water reservoir in Slovakia, and one of the biggest in Europe as well. Because of its warm climate, good soils and water reservoirs it is an important agricultural region, with the best conditions for crop production. It is the most fertile region in Slovakia, causing the majority of the island to be deforested.

Southern parts of Žitný ostrov by the Danube are protected by Dunajské luhy Protected Landscape Area.

== Etymology ==
The current Slovak name of the island is modern and it's derived from the phonetic similarity of German Schütt (meaning dike) and Slovak žito (rye). This name was accepted and is commonly used also because the island is a very fertile region used for crop production.

The original name of the island is of Hungarian origin (1250 Chollocuz). Ján Stanislav incorrectly reconstructed the name as *Čalov (like Czech Čálovice, Serbian Čalovići or Polish Nieczałów, Varsik as *Čelov (like Čelovce in Eastern Slovakia). The Hungarian name Csallóköz is derived from the old Hungarian name of the Little Danube – Csalló.

== Image gallery ==
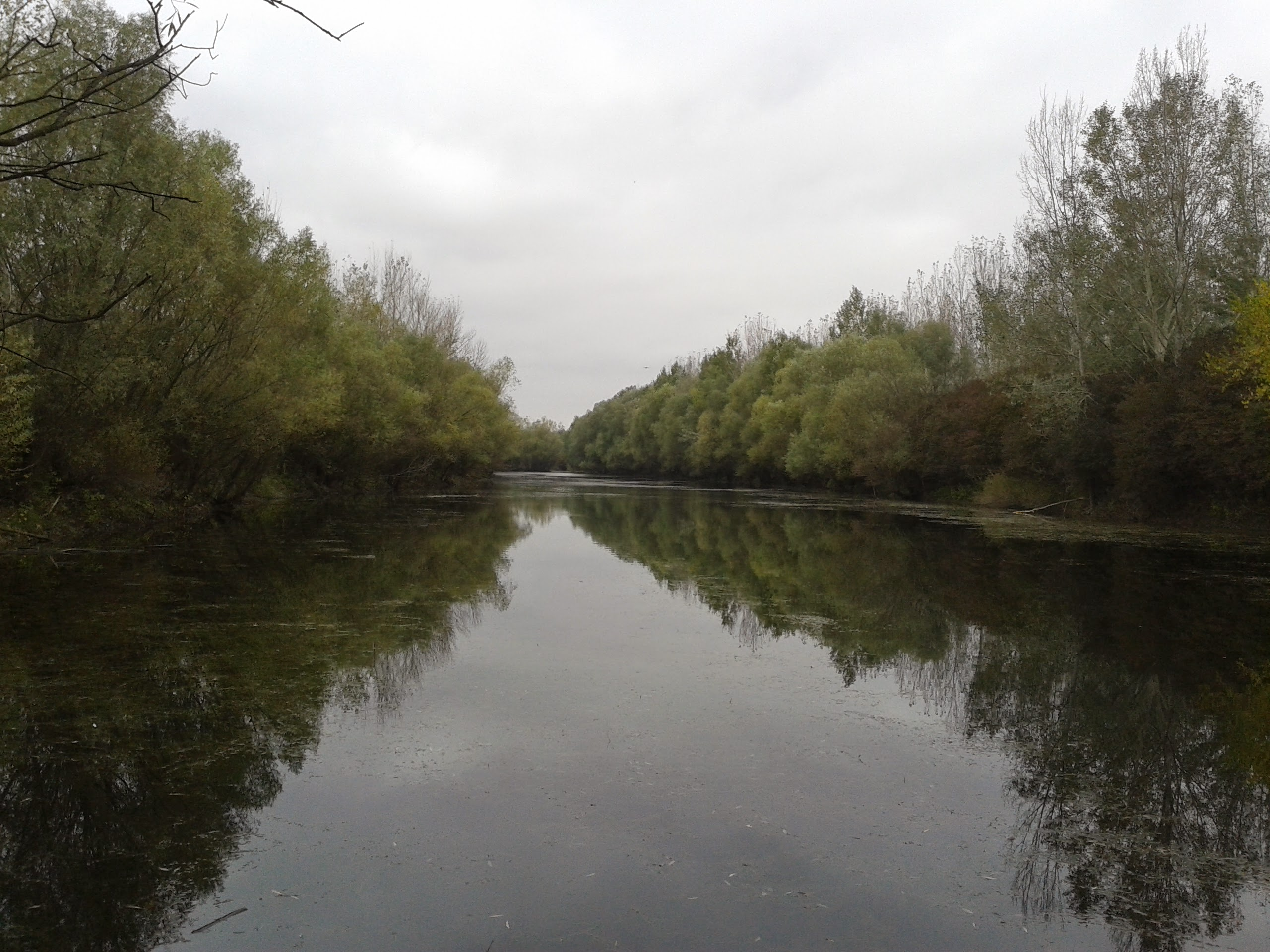
Little Danube, which forms Žitný Ostrov, along with the Danube and Váh rivers

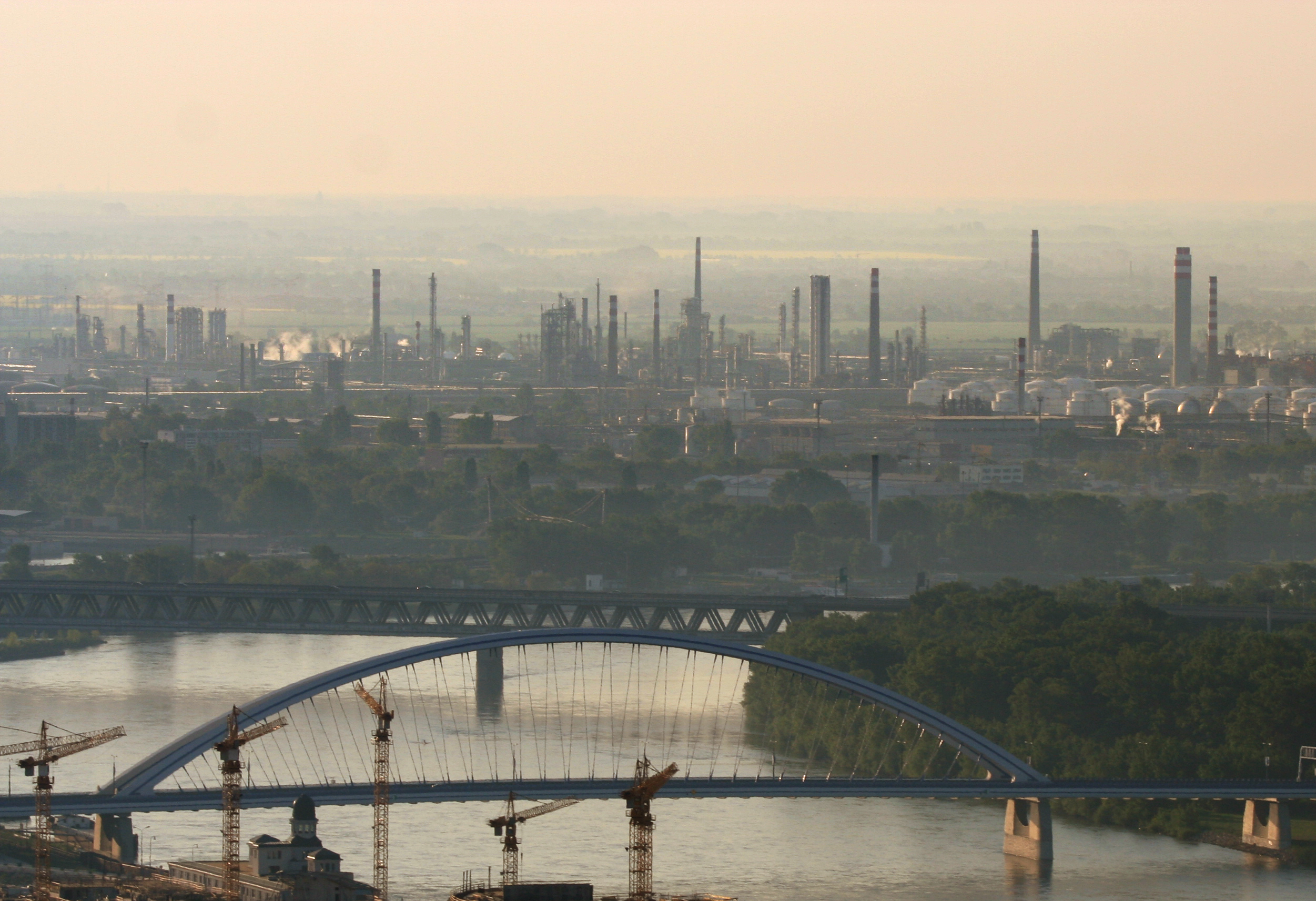
Slovnaft refinery in Bratislava

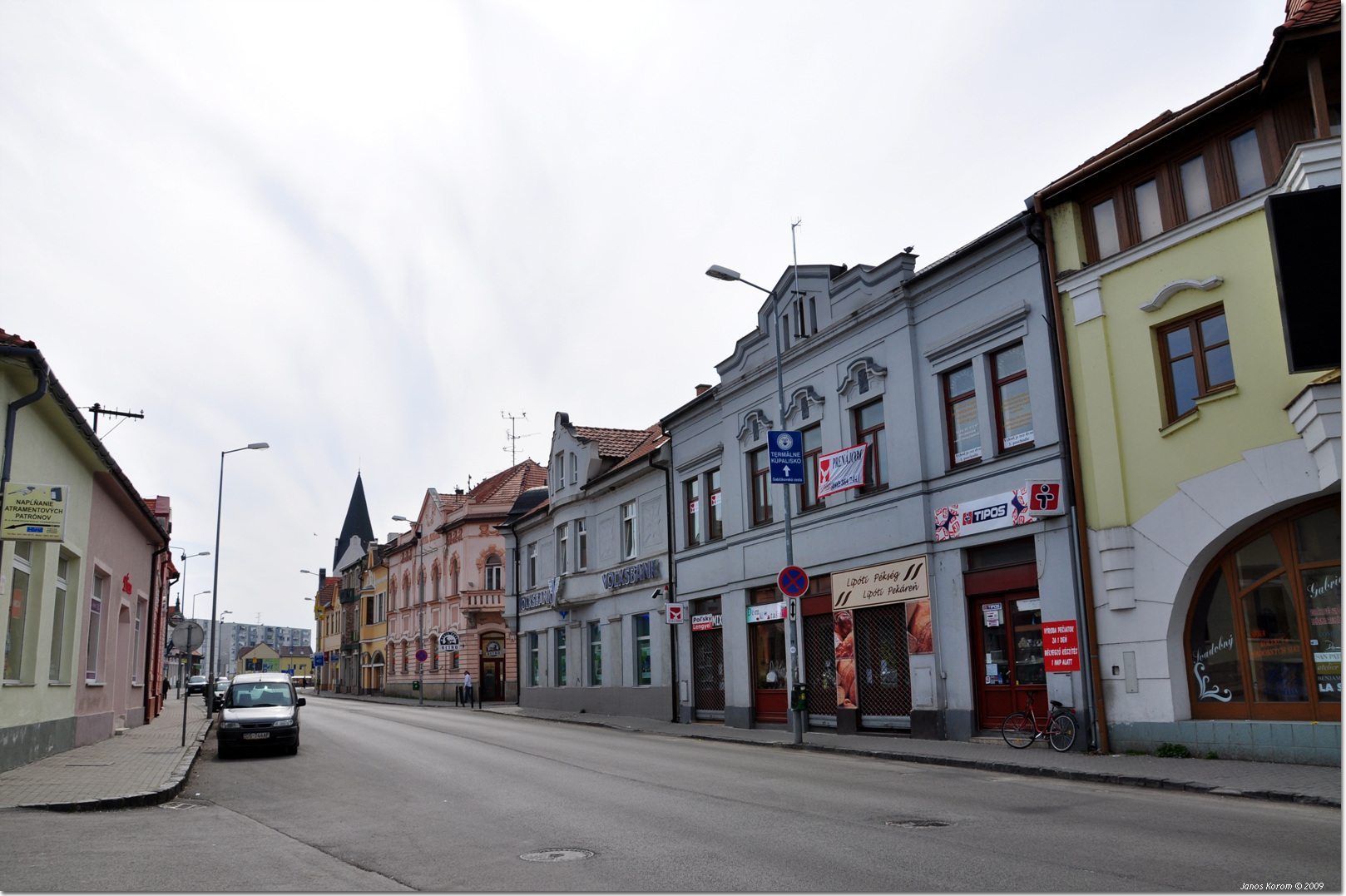
Dunajská Streda, one of the towns located on Žitný ostrov

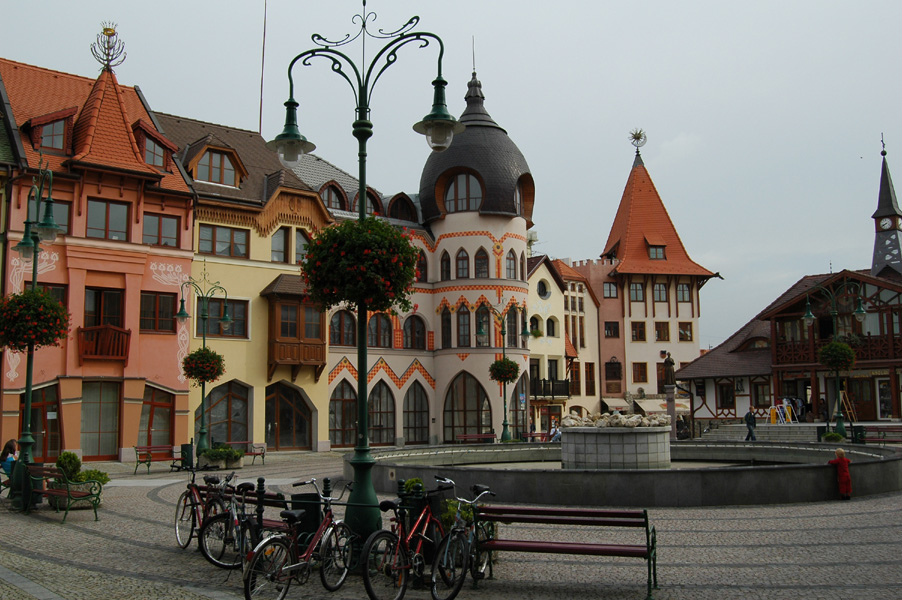
Komárno, one of the towns located on Žitný ostrov

== See also ==
- Malý Žitný ostrov
