= Emil Benčík =

Slovak writer

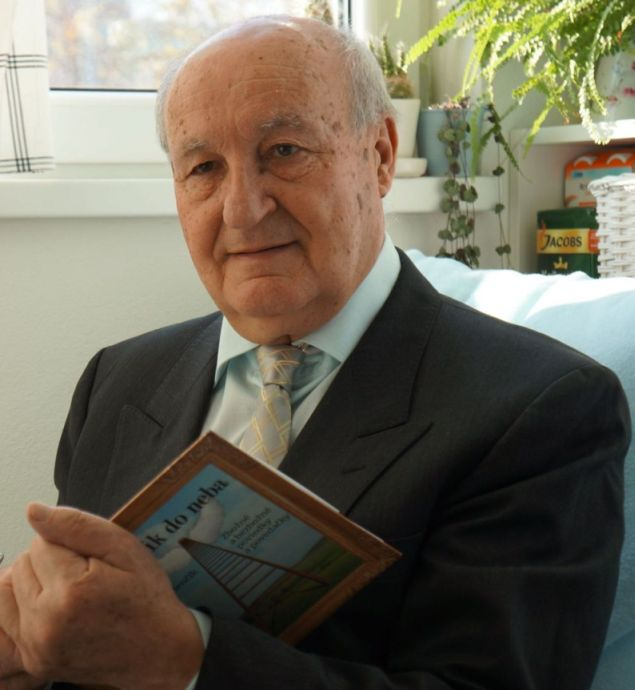
- Slovak writer, journalist and translator
- Born: 20 January 1933 (age 93); Zlatno, nearby Zlaté Moravce, Czechoslovakia (now Slovakia)
- Occupation: writer
- Writing career
- Notable awards: Prize of Egon Erwin Kisch

Emil Benčík (born 20 January 1933, in Zlatno) is a Slovak writer, journalist and translator. He established the feature radio documentary in Slovakia and created the first family radio series in the country called Čo nového, Bielikovci, which during its 17 years run established itself as one of the most popular programs in Slovakia's history with almost 1 in 2 Slovaks tuning in regularly.

In the 1950s he was a member of the notable journalistic generation centered on the newspaper Smena. From 1971 until 1990 he was the Chief editor of the Main desk of literary and drama broadcasting of the Czechoslovak radio in Bratislava.

For his journalistic and literary work, Emil Benčík has received numerous awards including the international Prize of Egon Erwin Kisch for his book Králi Ducha (Kings of the spirit). He is the first and only author to receive the Prize of Vojtech Zamarovský for radio broadcasting.

== Biography ==
Benčík was born on 20 January 1933 in Zlatno near Zlaté Moravce. He studied Slovak language and Russian language at Pedagogical faculty of the Comenius University in Bratislava. Later he worked as a teacher at elementary school in Lokca and at pedagogic gymnasium in Krupina. A long-time editor of the Slovak Radio in Bratislava, he has written many literary, biographical, dramatic and radio documentaries (features), series and cycles.

== Work ==
=== Literary work ===
- 1971 – Domov a svet, spolu s K. Kowaliszyn. (The home and the world – with K. Kowaliszyn)
- 2003 – Prvý muž česko-slovenskej jari Alexander Dubček (The first man of Czechoslovak spring)
- 2007 – Čo neodvial vietor (What the wind did not blow away)
- 2008 – Rebrík do neba (A ladder to the heaven)
- 2010 – Králi ducha (Kings of the spirit)
- 2011 – Bohatá žatva Andreja Chudobu (Wealthy harvest of Andrej Chudoba)
- 2014 - Zlatno v náručí hôr (Zlatno hugged by the mountains)

=== Literary translations ===
- 1960 – Dawid Rubinowicz: Dávidkov denník (Davids´ notebook)
- 1962 – Włodzimierz Jaroszyński: Tajný front (The secret front)
- 1972 – Alojzy Twardecki: Škola janičiarov (School of the traitors)

=== Radio cycles ===
- 1997–2004 – Ľudia, fakty, udalosti (People, facts, affairs)
- 2003–2008 – Sólo pre... (Solo for...)
- 2008–2011 – Takí sú rozhlasáci (Such are the radio workers)

=== Radio features ===
- 1972 – Tiché ruky, Hniezdo na dlani, Nechajme stromy rásť, Na dne leta (Quiet hands, Nest in the hands, Let the trees grow, At the bottom of the summer)
- 1975 – Dráma lásky a nelásky (Dramas of love and without love)
- 1979 – Zasadiť strom (To plant a tree)
- 1978 – Zatmenie Zeme (Eclipse of the Earth)
- 1989 – Vaša výsosť peniaze (Your majesty, money)
- 1990 – Slovenský chlebík (Slovak bread)
- 1990 – Sako Róm gilavel – Každý Róm si spieva (Every gypsy sings for himself)
- 1991 – Zvon Andrej (The bell Andrej)
- 1991 – Život a smrť s Dávidovou hviezdou (Life and death with the David's star)
- 1993 – Akí sme, takí sme (We are, who we are)
- 1993 – Prvý muž Pražskej jari (The first man of the Prague Spring)
- 1994 – Dies veritatis – Deň pravdy (Day of the truth)
- 1994 – Hviezdne nebo nad Jeruzalemom (Starry heaven above Jerusalem)
- 1995 – Kniha kníh prehovorí k všetkým (The big book address all)
- 1995 – Posledný deň vojny, prvý deň mieru (The last day of war, the first day of peace)
- 1996 – Teheránska, Jaltská a Postupimská konferencia (The Tehran conference, Yalta conference and Potsdam conference)
- 1996 – Norimberský proces (The Nuremberg trial)
- 1996 – Po dobrom živote dobrá smrť (After a good life, good death)
- 1997 – Podla vzoru srdce (According to heart)
- 1997 – Operácia Overlord (Operation Overlord)
- 1997 – Eroica Varsoviensis
- 1998 – Čierne dni v éteri (Black days on air)
- 1999 – Dlhá noc v Kremli (Long night in Kremlin)
- 2000 – Čo nám dalo a čo nám vzalo 20. storočie (What did the 20th century give us and what did it take away from us)
- 2002 – Hlavou proti múru (With the head against the wall)
- 2003 – Tanec nad priepasťou (Dancing above the gorge)
- 2003 – Pred bránou pekla (Before the gate of hell)
- 2004 – Plamienky nádeje (Pilot lights of hope)
- 2005 – Bola raz jedna Nežná (There was once a Velvet Revolution)
- 2006 – Neslávny odchod mocných (Inglorious departure of the powerful)

=== Radio drama translations ===
- Henryk Bardijevski: Koperník (Copernicus)
- Józef Gruda: Poľská suita, Albert, Kapela (Polish suite, Albert, The band)
- Andrzej Mularczyk: Z hlbín vôd, Balkón na Hlavnej ulici, Prespať zimu, Kuchynský vchod (From deep waters, Balcony on the broadway, Be asleep all winter, Kitchen entrance)
- Marian Grzesczak: Poľská symfónia (Polish symphony)

== Awards ==
- 1998 – Golden medal of Alexander Dubček
- 2001 – Prize of Vojtech Zamarovský
- 2011 - Prize of Egon Erwin Kisch

Emil Benčík is also the holder of numerous other awards and prizes.

== Monographies and studies ==
Life and work of Emil Benčik is the subject of the following monographies, studies and scientific papers:

- Encyclopedia of Slovakia, Volume I. Encyclopedic office of the Slovak Academy of Sciences, Bratislava : Osveta, 1977. Page 177.
- Encyclopedia of Slovak dramatic arts, Volume I. Veda – publishing house of the Slovak Academy of Sciences, Bratislava, 1989. Page 103.
- Matovcik, A. et al.: Dictionary of Slovak writers of the 20th century. Publishing house SSS and SNK, Bratislava – Martin, 2001. Page 33.
- Dictionary of the Club of Czech and Slovak writers of non-fiction literature. Prague, 2003. Page 268.
- Kačala, J.: Language in Emil Benčík's book about three Slovak kings of spirit, Kultúra slova, volume 46, Bratislava, 2012.
- Herceg, M.: Emil Benčík – Ambidextrous journalistic personality. Dissertation, School of Journalism at the Faculty of Philosophy, Commenius University, Bratislava, 2006.
- Nemečková, L.: Radio document in the Slovak Radio - Emil Benčík, key personality of the founding generation, dissertation, Faculty of Mass Media at the Paneuropean University, evidence number FM-24684-7985, Bratislava, 2014.
- Chapters of history of the radio (Príspevky k dejinám rozhlasu). Slovak Radio, Bratislava, 2006.
- What was (and wasn't) on air (Čo bolo (i nebolo) v éteri). Slovak Radio, Bratislava, 2003.

== See also ==
- Slovak Radio
