= Klára Kubičková =

Slovak architectural historian

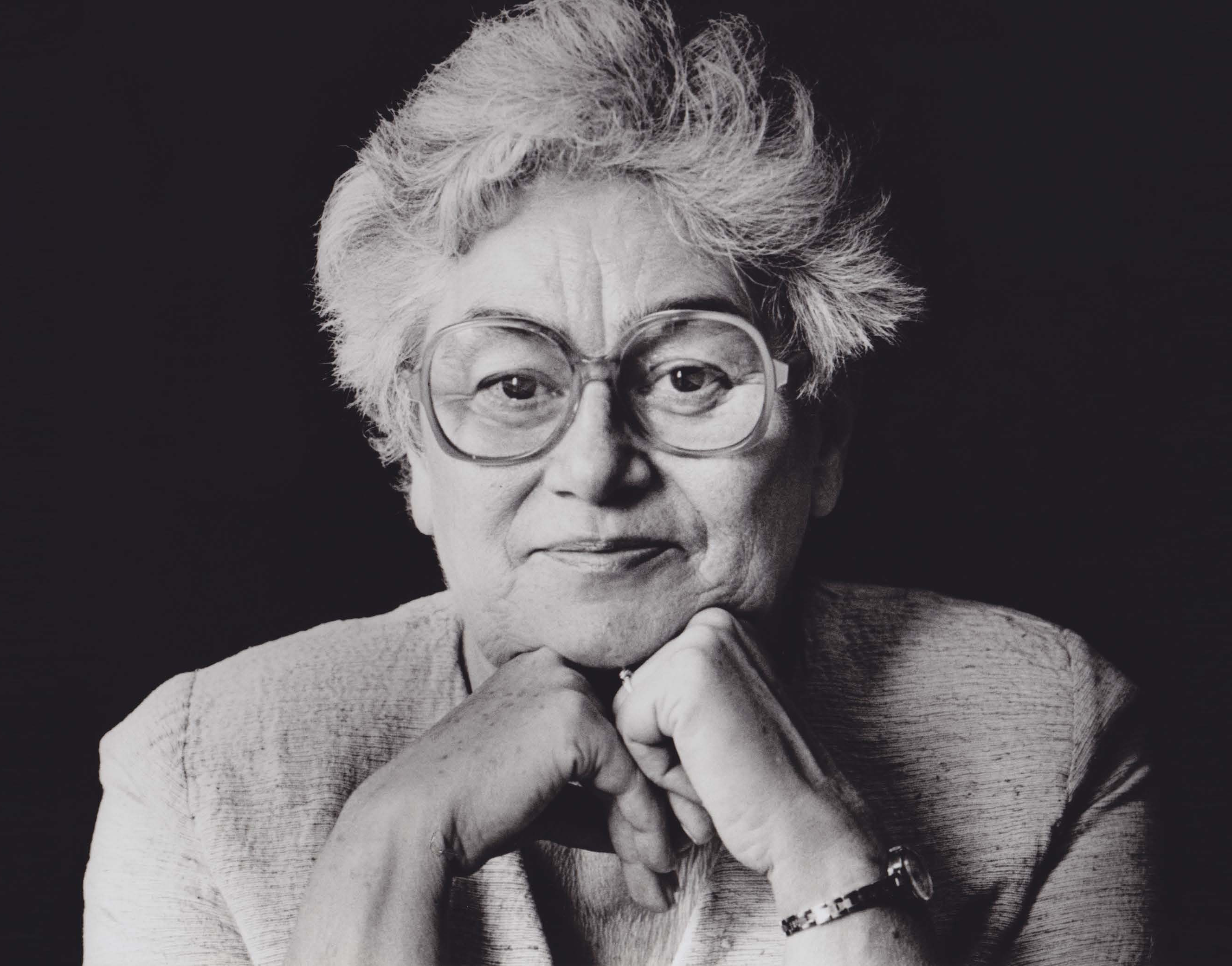
- Born: Klára Kucserová; 15 August 1936; Levice, Czechoslovakia
- Died: 25 November 2022 (aged 86)
- Education: Comenius University
- Occupation: Architectural historian

Klára Kubičková (born Klára Kucserová; 15 August 1936 – 25 November 2022) was a Slovak architectural historian whose work significantly contributed to the study and preservation of modern architecture in Slovakia. Her dedication to documenting architectural heritage earned her recognition both nationally and internationally.

== Early life and education ==
Kubičková was born in Levice, Czechoslovakia. She pursued her education in architecture and history at the Faculty of Arts of the Comenius University in Bratislava.

== Career ==
Kubičková's career was marked by her commitment to studying and promoting modern Slovak architecture. She played a pivotal role in Slovakia's participation in Docomomo International, an organization dedicated to the documentation and conservation of buildings from the modern movement. Her efforts helped highlight Slovakia's architectural achievements on an international stage. As chairwoman of Docomomo's Slovak branch, she organized the 1996 Docomomo International conference, held in Bratislava.

As a curator, Kubičková established the first collection of architecture at the Slovak National Gallery. She also curated several exhibitions at the gallery, and, in 1991, the Czechoslovak presentation at the Venice Architecture Biennale. She also created Archikatúra, an "international biennial of architecture cartoons".

Kubičková contributed extensively to architectural research through publications, projects, and collaborations. One notable project was the book 101: Slovak Architecture, which she inspired and to which she contributed significantly. This publication showcases 101 modernist buildings across Slovakia, emphasizing their historical importance and the need for preservation.

== Later life and legacy ==
Kubičková stepped down as chairwoman of DOCOMOMO Slovakia in 1998. She moved to Banská Bystrica to look after her ill daughter and her grandchildren.

Kubičková died on 25 November 2022. In recognition of her contributions, DOCOMOMO Slovakia dedicated their efforts to preserving modern Slovak architecture in her memory.

== Awards and honors ==
- Emil Bellus Award (2019), for "her lifetime dedication to architecture"
- Pribina Cross class II (2020), for "her extraordinary service to the cultural development of the country"
