= Order of Ľudovít Štúr =

State decoration of Slovakia

Order of Ľudovít Štúr Rad Ľudovíta Štúra
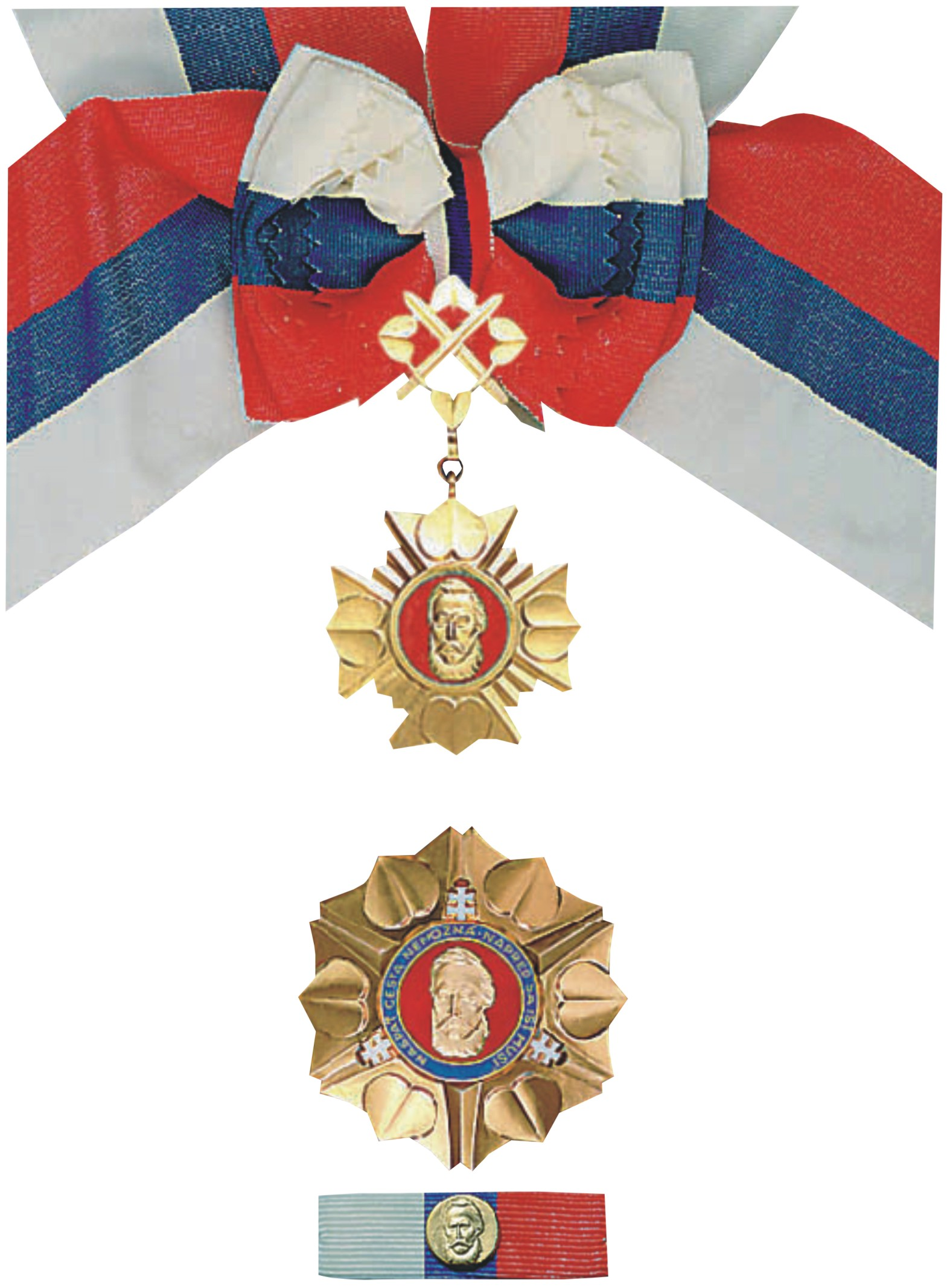
- Order of Ľudovít Štúr I. class – military

Awarded by President of Slovakia
- Type: Order
- Eligibility: Citizens
- Awarded for: Services to Slovakia
- Status: Currently constituted
- Sovereign: H.E. Peter Pellegrini
- Grades: 1st Class; 2nd Class; 3rd Class

Precedence
- Next (higher): Order of Andrej Hlinka
- Next (lower): Pribina Cross
- Order of Andrej Hlinka Pribina Cross

The Order of Ľudovít Štúr (Slovak: Rad Ľudovíta Štúra) is the third highest Slovak state decoration (after the Order of the White Double Cross and the Order of Andrej Hlinka) conferred by the President of the Slovak Republic upon the proposal of the government. The president, who is a recipient, 1st Class, of the order by virtue of holding office, is not obligated to respect the proposal.

The medal is awarded to Slovak citizens who have made exceptional contributions to democracy and human rights, the defence and security of the republic, or for exceptionally significant merit in the fields of politics, state management and administration, the development of the national economy, science and technology, culture, art, education, sports, and for significant spread of the good name of the Slovak Republic abroad.

The Order of Ľudovít Štúr, instituted on 2 February 1994, is bestowed annually on 1 September, on the occasion of the anniversary of the approval of the Constitution of Slovakia. It is named after the Slovak poet, philosopher, politician, and writer Ľudovít Štúr (1815–1856).

== Classes ==
The award has two types—civil and military; each type has three classes, ranked by degree of merit.

Medals
Ribbons
| 3rd Class | 2nd Class | 1st Class |

== Selected recipients ==
1st Class, civil

- Peter Baco
- Július Binder
- Peter Breiner
- Rudolf Chmel
- Ladislav Chudík
- Pavol Demitra
- Michal Dočolomanský
- Alexander Dubček
- Henrieta Farkašová
- Jaroslav Filip
- Milan Hamada
- Daniela Hantuchová
- Dominik Hrušovský
- Klára Jarunková
- Ivan Kamenec
- Ján Chryzostom Korec
- Michal Kováč
- Sergej Kozlík
- Juraj Králik
- Mária Kráľovičová
- Ľubor Kresák
- Eva Kristínová
- Zuzana Kronerová
- Ján Kuciak
- Miroslav Kusý
- Anastasiya Kuzmina
- Ján Langoš
- Ondrej Lenárd
- Michal Martikán
- Miloslav Mečíř
- Hana Ponická
- Ján Popluhár
- Ľudovít Rajter
- Milan Rúfus
- Juraj Schenk
- Martin Milan Šimečka
- Ester Šimerová-Martinčeková
- Ján Stanislav
- Ivan Šramko
- Peter Šťastný
- Eugen Suchoň
- Dominik Tatarka
- Ernest Valko
- Branislav Varsik
- Emília Vášáryová
- Magdaléna Vášáryová
- Veronika Velez-Zuzulová
- Petra Vlhová
- Štefan Vrablec
- Vojtech Zamarovský
- Ilja Zeljenka
- Zuzana Žirková
- František Zvarík

1st Class, military

- Ivan Bella
- Ján Golian
- Rudolf Viest

2nd Class, civil

- Imrich Andrejčák
- Juraj Bartusz
- Mária Bieliková
- Martin Bútora
- Zdeno Chára
- Dominik Hrbatý
- Mirosław Iringh
- Peter Jaroš
- Eugen Jurzyca
- Karol Kučera
- Ivan Laluha
- Ľubomír Lipták
- Martina Moravcová
- Eva Mosnáková
- Jozef Plachý
- Miroslav Šatan
- Martin Slivka
- Anton Srholec
- Ján Starší
- Soňa Valentová
- Bohdan Warchal
- Alfréd Wetzler
- Ján Zachara
- Vojtech Zamarovský

2nd Class, military

- Ján Nálepka

3rd Class, civil

- Ladislaus Bolchazy
- Michal Drobný
- Oskár Elschek
- Vladimír Godár
- Elena Lacková
- Michal Mertiňák
- Ján Riapoš
- Eva Siracká
- Peter Solan
