= Pavel Traubner =

Slovak physician (1941–2024)

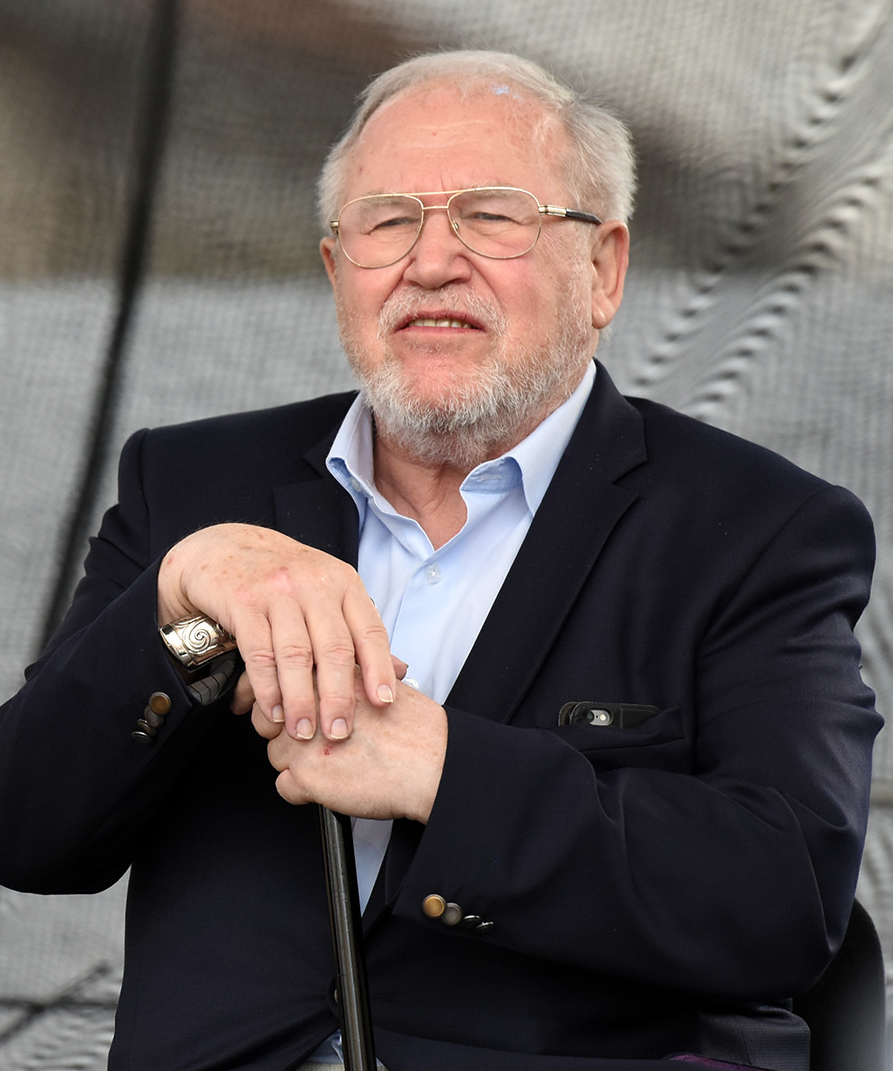
- Traubner in 2017
- Born: 2 May 1941; Ilava, Slovak Republic
- Died: 14 November 2024 (aged 83); Bratislava, Slovakia
- Education: Comenius University
- Awards: Pribina Cross, 2nd class (2001)
- Scientific career
- Fields: Neurology
- Workplaces: Comenius University

Pavel Traubner (2 May 1941 – 14 November 2024) was a Slovak neurologist.

== Life and career ==
Traubner was born in Ilava on 2 May 1941, to a Jewish family, which faced persecution by the Hlinka Guard. His father was a dentist. In 1944, a policeman, who was a patient of Traubner's father, warned the family that it is about to be deported to a concentration camp. The family hid in a disused military bunker hidden deep in a forest, leaving all their possessions behind.

Traubner studied medicine at the Comenius University. As a medical student, he moonlighted at a morgue to support himself, as his family fell into poverty after a sudden death of his father due to a stroke.

Traubner graduated with a medical degree in 1964. In 1985, he defended his candidature. In 1991, he became a professor of neurology at the Comenius University, where he taught until his death. Between 1991 and 2008, Traubner was the head doctor at the neurology department of the university hospital. Between 2000 and 2007, he served as the Dean of Faculty of Medicine.

In addition to medical and academic career, Traubner was active as the honorary chairman of the Central Association of Jewish Religious Communities (UZZNO) and of B'nai B'rith.

In 2001, he was awarded the Pribina Cross, 2nd class for his medical and academic achievements by the president Rudolf Schuster.

=== Personal life and death ===
In 1974, Traubner married Katerína, a chemical engineer. They had two daughters; Ronnie, who also became a neurologist, and Wanda, a child psychologist.

Trauber died in Bratislava on 14 November 2024, at the age of 83.
