= Ester Šimerová-Martinčeková =

Slovak painter (1909–2005)

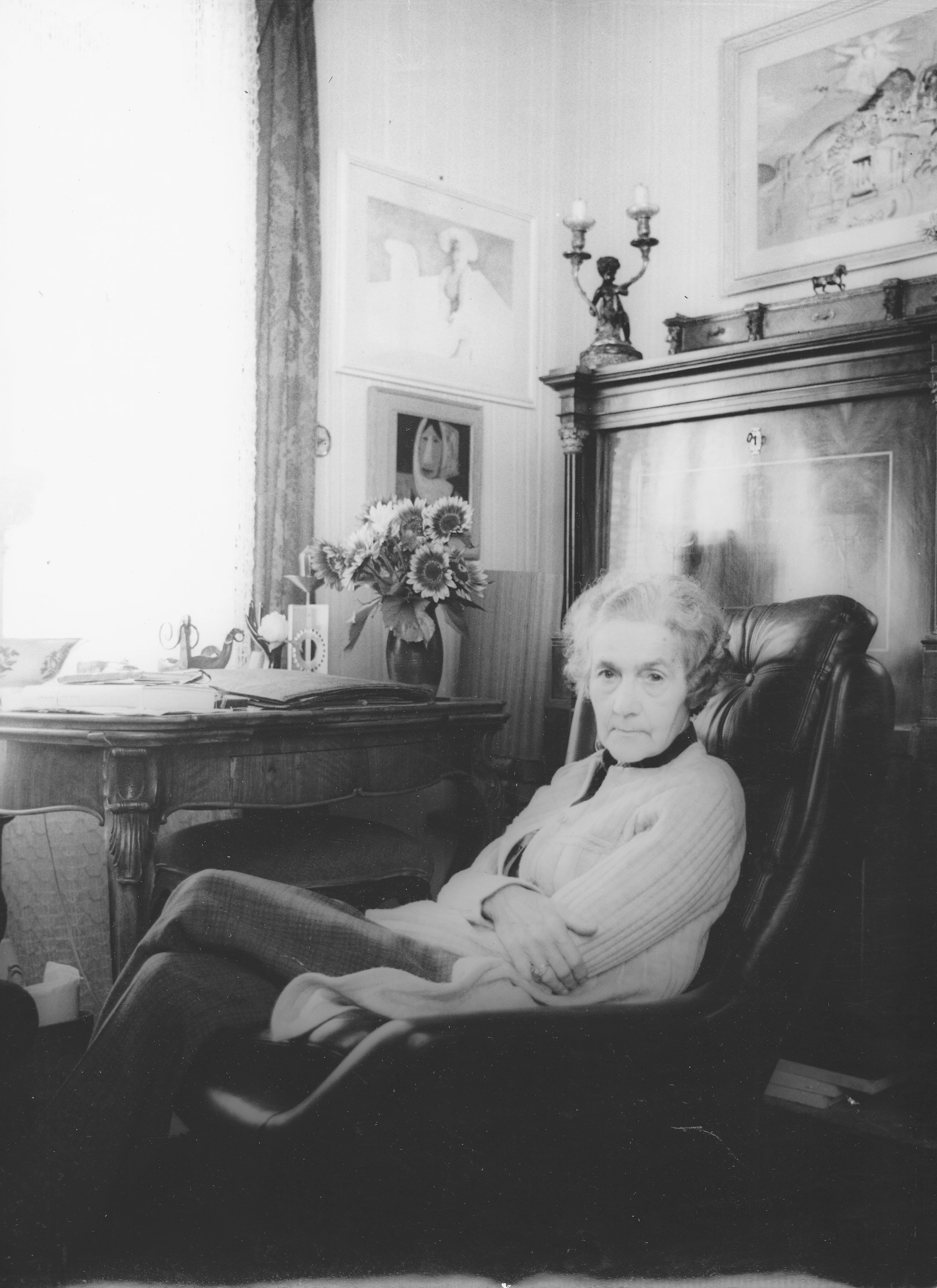
- Born: Ester Fridriková; January 24, 1909; Bratislava, Austria-Hungary
- Died: August 7, 2005 (aged 96); Liptovský Mikuláš, Slovakia
- Education: Académie Julian; Académie Moderne
- Spouses: František Šimer (died 1943) Martin Martinček (m. 1947)
- Awards: Order of Tomáš Garrigue Masaryk, 4th class 1991; Order of Ľudovít Štúr, 1st class 2001

Signature
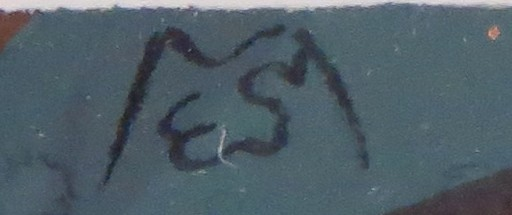

Ester Šimerová-Martinčeková (24 January 1909 – 7 August 2005) was a Slovak painter, scenic designer and journalist.

== Early life and education ==
Ester Fridriková was born in Bratislava on 23 January 1909. Her mother was a musician, who had to overcome significant barriers in her career due to her sex, which motivated her mother to support Ester in her artistic pursuits.

She trained in Paris in the interwar period at the Académie Julian and the Académie Moderne. Fridriková studied extensively with Aleksandra Ekster, and was greatly influenced by Ekster's style of Cubo-Futurism.

== Career ==
Ester Šimerová-Martinčeková's works were repeatedly affected by the changing political climate, from her early education in the 1920s to her final works in the 1990s. Her Modern paintings in the 1930s were described by critics as brave and pioneering, but were quickly derided as degenerate art by the Nazis after they took power.

Following the war and her relocation from Bratislava, the themes of her work changed. Šimerová's early Modern works experienced a return in popularity in the 1960s, and at that time she also began experimenting in the medium of collage. A theme that persisted throughout her works was chess.

== Later life ==
Šimerová was known for her opinions on the intersection of art and politics. In a 1934 newspaper interview, she opined that modern art "has a primarily artistic function. The social idea finds much better promotional means in photomontage, film, radio, theater and literature". Thirty years later, in 1966, she was still criticizing the overreliance of modern art on politics. Alongside her statements on the role of politics in art, Šimerová's later works often featured themes of workers, doves of peace, and other identifiably political symbols.

After her first marriage, she was known as Ester Fridriková-Šimerová, and after her second as Ester Šimerová-Martinčeková. Her first husband, František Šimer, was a well-respected doctor in Bratislava and later Plzeň, who supported the Resistance against the Nazis, until his arrest in 1942 and later execution. Her second husband, Martin Martinček, was a lawyer and politician until his expulsion from public service with the 1948 coup.

From the late 1940s onwards, Ester Šimerová-Martinčeková lived in Liptovský Mikuláš.

Šimerová's health began to decline in the 1990s, and she created her final artwork in 1994.

Ester Šimerová-Martinčeková died in Liptovský Mikuláš in 2005.

== Awards ==
Šimerová received the Order of Tomáš Garrigue Masaryk, 4th class, in 1991, awarded by President Václav Havel. In 2001, she was awarded the Order of Ľudovít Štúr, 1st class, by President Rudolf Schuster.

== Legacy ==
Šimerová's Cubist works are recognized as an integral part of Slovak art history, and Šimerová is known as the "first lady of Slovak painting".

In 1987, the Czechoslovak post published the reproduction of her artwork Tulips on a stamp. In 2016, Slovenská pošta chose Chess composition artwork to be depicted on a stamp.

A 2014 book by L̕udmila Peterajová includes prints of a number of her artworks, and a biography.
