= Elena Lacková =

Slovak poet and writer (1921–2003)

- Born: Elena Doktorová; 22 March 1921; Veľký Šariš, Czechoslovakia
- Died: 1 January 2003 (aged 81); Košice, Slovakia
- Education: Charles University
- Occupation: Writer
- Spouse: Jozef Lacko
- Children: 6
- Relatives: Alžbeta Ferencová (granddaughter)
- Writing career
- Language: Romani
- Notable awards: Order of Ľudovít Štúr, 3rd class

Elena Lacková (née Elena Doktorová; also known as Ilona Lacková; 22 March 1921 – 1 January 2003) was a Slovak Romani writer and playwright, author of literature for Roma children and youth.

== Life and works ==
Elena Lacková was born in Veľký Šariš, the first of five children of the Roma fiddler Mikuláš Doktor and a Polish mother. She has been interested in literature since early childhood and began writing at the age of 14. Her poem London – Paris – Veľký Šariš was broadcast on the radio. After attending elementary school, Elena Lacková continued her education in the nearby town of Prešov from 1932 to 1935. In 1939 she wrote her first play called The Transplanted Flower, which, however, was not allowed to be performed. She married Jozef Lacko, with whom she had six children, one died during World War II. Her wartime experiences are among the central themes of her works. In 1948 she wrote the play Horiaci cigánsky tábor (A Burning Gypsy Camp), which she rehearsed with people from the settlement where she lived at the time. After the press of the time reported on it, the actors and actresses were invited by the Ministry of Social Affairs in Prague to perform the play in the border areas of the Czech lands, to which many Roma had been resettled from Slovakia. In 1951, Elena Lacková began her work in the Regional People's Committee, where she looked after Roma.

In 1960 she started working at the District Pedagogical House in Košice. In 1964, while working at the Faculty of Education and Journalism at Charles University in Prague, she graduated as the officially first professing Romni in Slovakia in 1970 at the age of 49 and became a co-founder of the Cultural Association of Gypsy Roma in Prešov After graduation, she worked for two years as a teacher and social worker in Ústí nad Labem, then as a social curator in eastern Slovakia.

Her granddaughter is the actress Alžbeta Ferencová.

After 1989, Lacková became the president of the Cultural Association of Gypsy Roma and was the editor of the magazine Romano ľil. In 1993, Elena Lacková became a member of the Slovak Writers' Union. For her contribution to the development of the cultural-social life of the Roma in Slovakia, on the occasion of the 9th anniversary of the Constitution of the Slovak Republic in 2001, the President of the Republic Rudolf Schuster awarded her the Order of Ľudovít Štúr, 3rd Class. On the occasion of her 80th birthday, she was awarded the Chatam Sofer Memorial Medal for her services to the documentation of the consequences of the Roma Holocaust.

== Death ==
Elena Lacková died on New Year's Eve 2003 at the age of 82 in a retirement home in Košice, where she had spent the last years of her life. On her last journey, on Saturday 4 January 2003, she was accompanied by more than 200 people, and among the mourning bouquets was one from Slovak President Rudolf Schuster.

== Honors ==
- Czech Radio Award (1989)
- Prix Bohemia Award (1989)
- Order of Ľudovít Štúr, 3rd Class, awarded by President Rudolf Schuster (2001)
- Chatam Sofer Memorial Medal (2001)

== Works ==
Sources:

- 1935: London – Paris – Veľký Šariš, Poems
- 1946: Horiaci cigánsky tábor, divadelní hra/ A Burning Gypsy Camp Stage play
- 1952: Nový život/New Life, Stage play
- 1955: Rómské srdce/Heart of the Roma, Stage play
- 1988: Žužika, Radio drama
- 1992: Rómske rozprávky – Romane paramisa, bilingual book
- 1994: Veľký primáš Baro" / Baro primašis Baro, Hrbatý Maren (Short stories)
- 1997: Narodila jsem se pod šťastnou hvězdou – Autobiography. (English ed."A false dawn 2000 )
- 2003: Husle s tromi srdcami / Lavuta trine jilenaca/ Violine mit 3 Herzen, – Short stories

=== Novellas ===
- Život vo vetre/Leben im Wind
- O mule na aven pale/Mŕvi sa nevracajú/Die Toten kehren nicht zurück
- Primáš Bari

== Read also ==
- Portréty – Elena Lacková. 1997. In: Romano džaniben 4 (1997), vol. 1–2, 69–87.
- Hübschmannová, Milena. 2001. Osmdesáté narozeniny Ilony Lackové: Uľiľom tel a bachtali čercheň. In: Romano džaniben 8 (2001), vol. 1–2, 12–27.
- Donert, Celia. 2017. The Rights of the Roma. The Struggle for Citizenship in Postwar Czechoslovakia. Cambridge: Cambridge University Press.
