= Ilava =

- Municipality
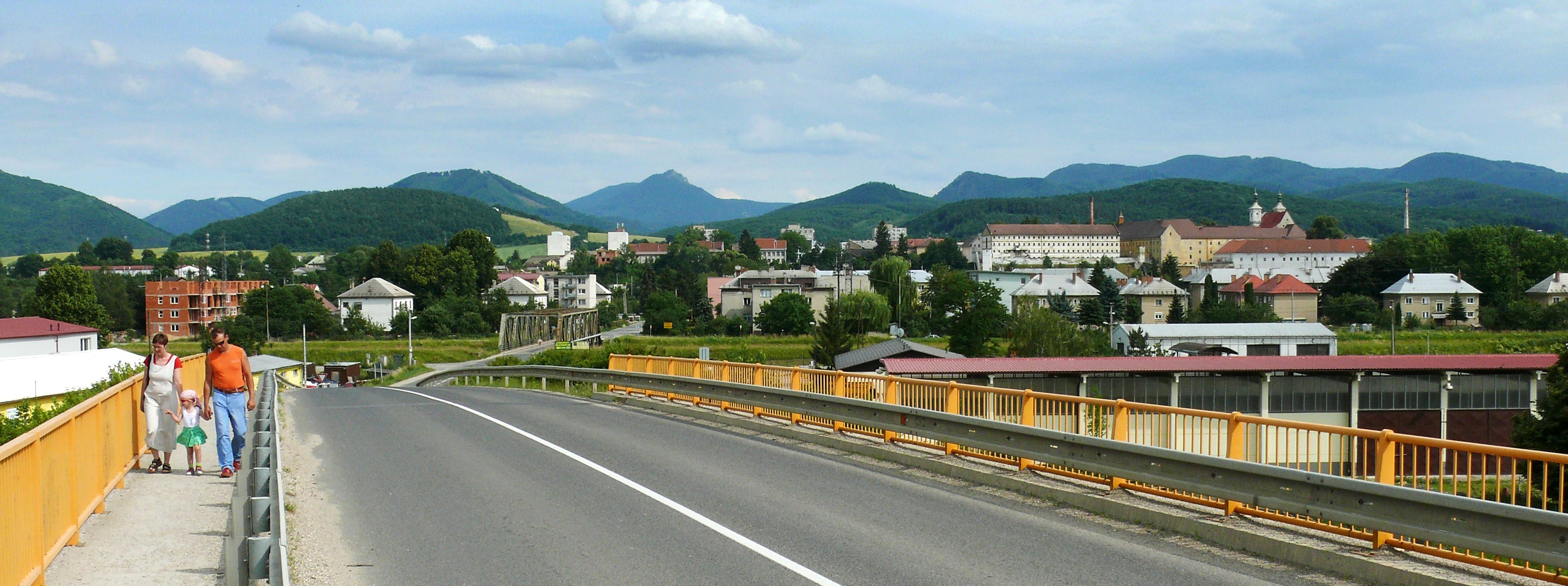

- Flag Coat of arms

- Location of Ilava in the Trenčín Region Location of Ilava in Slovakia
- Coordinates: 48.99°N 18.23°E
- Country: Slovakia
- Region: Trenčín Region
- District: Ilava District
- First mentioned: 1229

Government
  - Mayor: Viktor Wiedermann

Area
  - Total: 24.30 km^{2} (9.38 sq mi)
- Elevation: 313 m (1,027 ft)

Population (2025)
  - Total: 5,455
- Time zone: UTC+1 (CET)
  - Summer (DST): UTC+2 (CEST)
- Postal code: 190 1
- Area code: +421 42
- Vehicle registration plate (until 2022): IL
- Website: www.ilava.sk

Ilava (German: Illau, Hungarian: Illava) is a town in the Trenčín Region, northwestern Slovakia.

== Geography ==
The municipality lies at an altitude of 313 metres (1,027 ft) and covers an area of 24.30 km^{2} (9.38 sq mi) (2025).

== Name ==
The name is of uncertain origin. The historic medieval names were Lewe, Lewa (the same historic name as Levice), Lewa de cidca fluviom Vag, later Ilava. The form Illava is known from the 19th century and was used after the Austro-Hungarian Compromise of 1867.

== Population ==
Historical population
Year	Pop.	±%
1970	4,596	—
1980	5,188	+12.9%
1991	5,531	+6.6%
2001	5,411	−2.2%
2011	5,391	−0.4%
2021	5,572	+3.4%
Source: Censuses

Population statistic (10 years)
Year	1995	2005	2015	2025
Count	5446	5414	5474	5455
Difference		−0.58%	+1.10%	−0.34%

Population statistic
Year	2024	2025
Count	5522	5455
Difference		−1.21%

It has a population of 5455 people (31 December 2025).

=== Ethnicity ===
Census 2021 (1+%)
Ethnicity	Number	Fraction
Slovak	5239	94.02%
Not found out	311	5.58%
Czech	66	1.18%
Total	5572	

In year 2021 was 5572 people by ethnicity 5239 as Slovak, 311 as Not found out, 66 as Czech, 16 as Other, 8 as Hungarian, 7 as Russian, 5 as Italian, 3 as Irish, 3 as Vietnamese, 3 as Ukrainian, 3 as Albanian, 2 as Romani, 2 as Rusyn, 1 as Jewish, 1 as Chinese, 1 as Serbian, 1 as Austrian, 1 as German, 1 as Canadian and 1 as Bulgarian.

Note on population: The difference values of population numbers in the table "Population statistic" and in the sections "Ethnicity" & "Religion" is caused by the use of various statistical methods.

=== Religion ===
Census 2021 (1+%)
Religion	Number	Fraction
Roman Catholic Church	3915	70.26%
None	1091	19.58%
Not found out	384	6.89%
Evangelical Church	70	1.26%
Total	5572	

In year 2021 was 5572 people by religion 3915 from Roman Catholic Church, 1091 from None, 384 from Not found out, 70 from Evangelical Church, 17 from Ad hoc movements, 14 from Christian Congregations in Slovakia, 12 from Other and not ascertained christian church, 12 from Greek Catholic Church, 10 from Other, 9 from Apostolic Church, 6 from Islam, 5 from Paganism and natural spirituality, 5 from Jehovah's Witnesses, 5 from Buddhism, 4 from Eastern Orthodox Church, 3 from Calvinist Church, 3 from Seventh-day Adventist Church, 2 from Old Catholic Church, 2 from Czechoslovak Hussite Church, 2 from Church of the Brethren and 1 from Jewish community.

== Notable people ==
- Ivan Baranka (born 1985), ice hockey player
- Mária Bieliková (born 1966), computer scientist
- Hana Burzalová (born 2000), racewalker
- Martin Chromiak (born 2002), ice hockey player
- Radoslav Ďuriš (born 1974), wheelchair curler
- Artur Gajdoš (born 2004), association footballer
- Katrina Grey (born 1991), actress
- Marcel Hossa (born 1981), ice hockey player
- Tomáš Kopecký (born 1982), ice hockey player, two-time Stanley Cup Champion
- Marek Kvapil (born 1985), ice hockey player
- Richard Pavlikovský (born 1975), ice hockey player
- Natália Prekopová (born 1989), biathlete
- Ľubomír Šatka (born 1995), association footballer
- Tomáš Tatar (born 1990), ice hockey player
- Pavel Traubner (1941–2024), neurologist

== Twin towns — sister cities ==
Ilava is twinned with:

- Győr, Hungary
- Klimkovice, Czech Republic
- Mikołów, Poland

== See also ==
- List of municipalities and towns in Slovakia
