= Policie Hvar =

- Genre: Crime comedy
- Written by: Tomáš Grombíř; Kryštof Pavelka; Jan Singer; Tereza Dusová; Jozef Koleják
- Directed by: Tomáš Pavlíček; Kryštof Hanzlík
- Starring: Jakub Štáfek; Alžběta Ferencová
- Countries of origin: Czech Republic; Slovakia
- Original languages: Czech; Slovak; Croatian
- No. of seasons: 1
- No. of episodes: 8

Production
- Running time: 60 Minutes

Original release
- Network: TV Nova; Markíza
- Release: January 28, 2024

Policie Hvar is a Czech-Slovak crime comedy television series. The series was initially produced under title Dobro došli. It was produced by TV Nova in cooperation with TV Markíza.

== Plot ==
Series is set on a Croatian island Hvar. A pair of Czech-Slovak detectives Michal and Ivana helps to solve crimes related to Czech and Slovak tourists. While Michal is a witty, sarcastic "old school" detective, Ivana is a free-spirited, vivacious woman. Together they must restore the broken harmony of the sunny island. Together they get to investigate even the most serious crimes.

== Cast and characters ==
- Jakub Štáfek as Captain Michal Pokorný
- Alžbeta Ferencová as Captain Ivana Štefániková
- Bořek Slezáček as Major Goran
- Tom Sean Pšenička as sergeant Filip Kos
- Péter Nádasdi as Warrant Officer Karol Oravec
- Leona Skleničková as bartender Katka
- Vilma Cibulková as Jarmila Pokorná, mother of Michal
- Jakub Jablonský
- Simona Kollárová
- Filip Šebesta
- Veronika Meszárosová
- Viktória Petrášová
- Petr Vaněk
- Dagmar Lakčevič
- Jan Plouhar

== Episodes ==
Episode		Directed by	Written by	Original air date (Voyo)	Original air date (Nova)	Czech viewers (millions)
1	Dobro došli	Tomáš Pavlíček	Tereza Dusová, Tomáš Grombíř, David Musil	28 January 2024	4 February 2024	0.939
2	Povídka	Tomáš Pavlíček	Tereza Dusová, Tomáš Grombíř, David Musil	4 February 2024	11 February 2024	0.662
3	Příliš mnoho kouzelníků	Tomáš Pavlíček	Tereza Dusová, Tomáš Grombíř, David Musil	11 February 2024	18 February 2024	0.634
4	Spoluhráčky	Tomáš Pavlíček	Tereza Dusová, Tomáš Grombíř, David Musil	18 February 2024	25 February 2024	0.598
5	Indiáni	Kryštof Hanzlík	Tereza Dusová, Tomáš Grombíř, David Musil	25 February 2024	3 March 2024	0.646
6	Potápěči	Kryštof Hanzlík		3 March 2024	10 March 2024	0.694
7	Smím prosit?	Kryštof Hanzlík		10 March 2024	17 March 2024	0.701
8	Svatba plná nenávisti	Kryštof Hanzlík		17 March 2024	24 March 2024	0.741
