= Milan Hamada =

Slovak literary critic (1933–2023)

- Born: 9 September 1933; Veľká, Czechoslovakia
- Died: 13 February 2023 (aged 89); Bratislava, Slovakia
- Occupation: Literary critic
- Years active: 1957–2009

Milan Hamada (9 September 1933 – 13 February 2023) was a Slovak literary theorist, historian, and critic.

Hamada was born on 9 September 1933 in the village of Veľká, which has been a part of the city of Poprad since 1946. He was educated at the grammar school in Kežmarok and later studied Slovak and Russian language at the Comenius University, graduating in 1957. From 1959 to 1972 he worked as a researcher at the Slovak Academy of Sciences. His writings, in which he criticized ideological blindness and nationalism, significantly contributed to the intellectual underpinning of the Prague Spring.

Due to his staunch resistance to the Warsaw Pact invasion of Czechoslovakia in 1968, he faced persecution from the authorities and was not allowed to work in academia for much of the 1970s and 1980s. After the Velvet Revolution, he returned to the Academy of Sciences. From 1993 to his retirement in 2009 he also taught at the University of Trnava.

In 2003 Hamada received the Order of Ľudovít Štúr, 1st Class, from the president Rudolf Schuster.

Hamada died in Bratislava on 13 February 2023, at the age of 89.
