= Mária Kráľovičová =

Slovak actress (1927–2022)

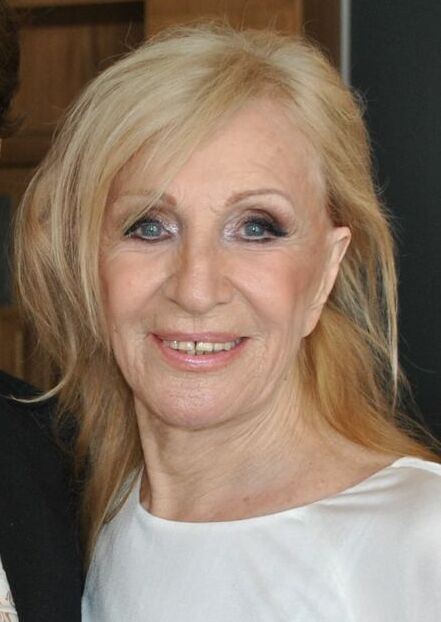
- Kráľovičová in 2013
- Born: 7 June 1927; Čáry, Czechoslovakia
- Died: 5 December 2022 (aged 95); Bratislava, Slovakia
- Occupation: Actress
- Years active: 1948–2022
- Employer: Slovak National Theatre
- Spouse: Miroslav Procházka
- Children: 2
- Awards: Order of Ľudovít Štúr, 1st Class

Mária Kráľovičová (7 June 1927 – 5 December 2022) was a Slovak actress who played over 400 roles across the mediums of film, stage and television. She was the first Slovak television actress, having starred in the 1957 television film Do videnia, Lucienne! alongside Elo Romančík.

== Career ==
Kráľovičová studied acting at the Bratislava Conservatory between 1947 and 1950, joining the Slovak National Theatre in 1948. In 1957 Kráľovičová became the first Slovak television actress due to her role alongside Elo Romančík in the television film Do videnia, Lucienne!, directed by Ján Roháč. In her career she has performed over 400 roles, including Juliet and Ophelia from Shakespeare's works (Romeo and Juliet and Hamlet, respectively), Salome created by Pavol Országh Hviezdoslav (Herodes a Herodias), Amália by Friedrich Schiller (The Robbers) and Virginia by Bertolt Brecht (Life of Galileo).

== Awards ==
The Order of Ľudovít Štúr, 1st Class, was bestowed upon Kráľovičová in 2002. At the 7th OTO Awards in 2006, she was recognised in the Hall of Fame for her acting. Kráľovičová was recognised for her acting at the 2007 Jozef Kroner Awards. 2008 saw her recognised at the Crystal Wing Awards for her work with television, theatre and dubbing. In 2012 Ivan Gašparovič presented her with the Medal of the President of the Slovak Republic, for her contribution to Slovak culture. The same year she was made an honorary citizen of Piešťany by mayor Remo Cicutto.

== Personal life and death ==
Kráľovičová had three sisters and one brother. She married journalist Miroslav Procházka; they spent 56 years together until his death at the age of 86 in 2005. Together they had two children, Miroslav and Jana.

Kráľovičová died on 5 December 2022, at the age of 95.

== Selected filmography ==
- Priehrada (TV Movie 1950)
- Do videnia, Lucienne! (TV Movie 1957)
- Skalní v ofsajde (TV Movie 1961)
- Cierny slnovrat (TV Movie 1985)
- Balada o vkladnej knizke (TV Movie 1985)
- Rodina Tjaeldeovcov (TV Movie 1986)
- Tiene v raji (TV Mini Series 1986)
- Bez problémov (TV Movie 1988)
- Barón (TV Movie 1989)
- Útrapy z rozumu (TV Movie 1990)
- Prvá noc pri mrtvej (TV Movie 1993)
- Dnes vecer hrám ja (TV Series 1993–1995)
- Duchovia (TV Series 1997–1998)
- Drahí príbuzní (TV Movie 1998)
- Amálka, ja sa zbláznim! (TV Movie 1999)
- Vadí nevadí (TV Movie 2001)
- Rodinné tajomstvá (TV Series 2005)
- Velké stastie (TV Movie 2006)
- Priateľky (TV Series 2008)
- Chrobák v hlave (TV Movie 2014)
