= Eva Mosnáková =

Slovak human rights activist (1929–2024)

- Born: Eva Fuchsová; 1929; Brno, Czechoslovakia
- Died: 29 November 2024 (aged 95); Bratislava, Slovakia
- Known for: Human rights activism
- Awards: Righteous Among the Nations (1998); Order of Ľudovít Štúr, 2nd class (2017)

Eva Mosnáková (1929 – 29 November 2024) was a Slovak human rights activist and survivor of Holocausts and Communist persecution.

== Biography ==
=== Early life ===
Eva Mosnáková was born in 1929 in Brno, in the Czech part of Czechoslovakia, to a Slovak Jewish veterinary student Andrej Fuchs and a Czech Christian mother Otílie Fuchsová. The family of Andrej Fuchs was opposed to a marriage to a non-Jewish woman, nonetheless he insisted on marrying the woman of his choice. Eva grew up in the Slovak mining town of Handlová, the hometown of her father, where her father landed a job as a veterinarian. In Handlová, Eva grew up in predominantly German speaking environment of the local Jewish community, but was also exposed to the ideals of Tomáš Masaryk through her mother, whose father was a tailor in the army.

=== Fascist persecution ===
With the rise of the fascist Slovak People's Party, Eva was sent to live with her aunts in Brno for two years. However, following the German Occupation of Czechoslovakia, she returned to her family, which settled in the village of Močenok, near Nitra. Initially, the family lived in relative safety due to Mosnáková's father's status as an "economically important Jew," which allowed him to continue his veterinary practice. This precarious stability ended with the outbreak of the Slovak National Uprising. Forced into hiding, the family sought refuge with Henrich Konrad, a German, who came to Močenok after marriage to a local woman Terézia. In spite of the German heritage of Henrich, the family supported the uprising and Terézia's younger brother Vladimír, a former officer of the Slovak army, personally took part in the armed resistance.

During this time, Eva became close to Vladimír, whose support for the resistance led to his arrest in early 1945 and imprisonment in the Mauthausen concentration camp. After the war and the liberation of the camp, Eva and Vladimír married and had two sons, Vladimír Jr. and Fedor.

=== Communist persecution ===
The family's ordeal continued after the war. In 1954, Vladimír was arrested and sentenced in a political trial to hard labor in the Jáchymov uranium mines. Fortunately, he was released a year later due to a general amnesty. Eva Mosnáková steadfastly supported her husband, and during the Prague Spring, they achieved full rehabilitation.

However, following the Warsaw Pact invasion of Czechoslovakia, Eva signed a petition condemning the invasion. This act of defiance resulted in a drastic wage cut and demotion. Meanwhile, Vladimír struggled with chronic health problems stemming from his imprisonment in the concentration camp and the harsh conditions in the uranium mine.

=== Activism and recognition ===
Starting in 1990s, Mosnáková became increasingly involved in the public sphere, sharing her personal experiences with persecution by the fascist and communist totalitarian regimes. In spite of advanced age, she traveled around Slovakia to promote democratic values. She also founded and led the Club of Senior Citizens who Survived the Holocaust.

Following the Velvet Revolution, the contributions of Eva Mosnáková and her husband finally received recognition. In 1998, the Yad Vashem committee extended the Righteous Among the Nations title to Eva and her husband. In 2017, she was awarded the Order of Ľudovít Štúr, 2nd class by the president of Slovakia Andrej Kiska for her lifelong work for democracy and human rights in Slovakia. In 2020, she received a human rights award by the US Embassy in Bratislava.

== Death ==
Mosnáková died in Bratislava on 29 November 2024, at the age of 95. The president of Slovakia Peter Pellegrini praised her bravery and lifelong devotion to human rights in a social media post in reaction to her death.
