= Szigetköz =

Largest island of Hungary

Coordinates: 47.85°N 17.45°E

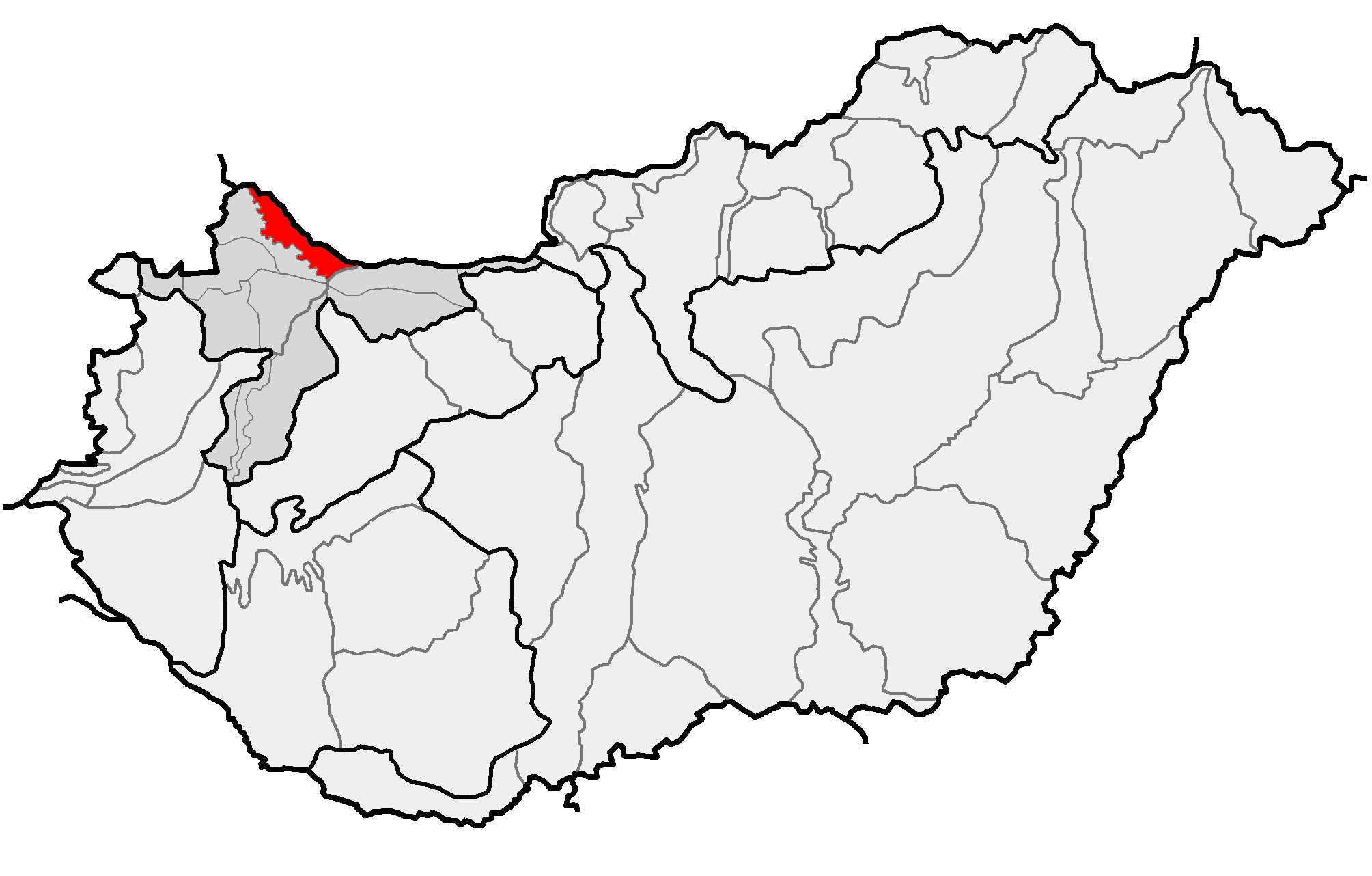
Location of Szigetköz (in red) within geographical subdivisions of Hungary

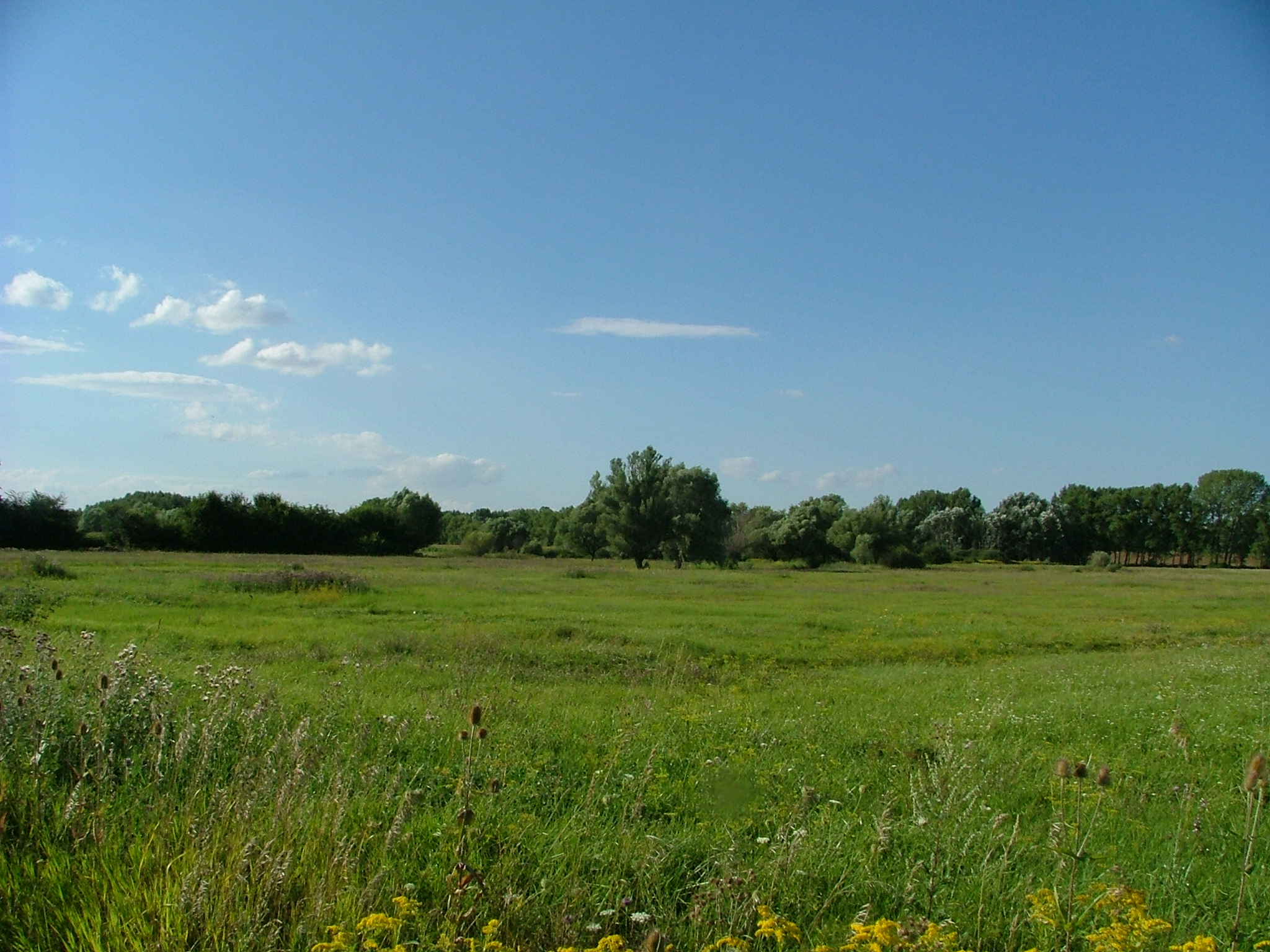
Wet meadow in Szigetköz

The Szigetköz (literally "island alley"; German: Kleine Schüttinsel, lit. 'Little Schütt Island'; Slovak: Malý Žitný ostrov, lit. 'Little Rye Island') is a flat alluvial region in northwestern Hungary, situated between the Danube River's main branch and its Mosoni-Duna branch, part of the Little Hungarian Plain. It is the largest island or inland delta in Hungary, with an area of 375 square kilometres (145 square miles).

The Szigetköz stretches about 50 km in length from near Dévény (Devin) at the Slovak border to the city of Győr, with an average width of 6–8 km. The terrain is a mosaic of rivers, side-channels, and small islands created by the Danube's sediment deposition over millennia. The region lies in the northern part of the Little Hungarian Plain (Kisalföld) and is essentially the Hungarian continuation of the Danube's vast alluvial fan (the Csallóköz/Rye Island lies to the north in Slovakia).

The name "Szigetköz" means "between the islands", reflecting the landscape's fragmented network of waterways and land. Historically, periodic floods from the Danube built up gravel and sandbars which were stabilized by vegetation, forming a myriad of islands and oxbow lakes. Prior to modern river engineering, the area was crisscrossed by branches of the Danube, supporting extensive wetlands and riparian forests. Even today, the Szigetköz contains rich flora and fauna: hardwood groves of oak, willow, and poplar line the riverbanks, and the backwaters provide habitat for waterfowl, fish, and amphibians. It is recognized as a significant semi-natural floodplain ecosystem, among the largest of its kind in Central Europe. Parts of the region are protected as the Szigetköz Landscape Protection Area. The Fertő-Hanság National Park also oversees some Szigetköz wetland restoration, especially after ecological changes caused by river regulation.

Environmentally, Szigetköz has faced challenges due to the Gabčíkovo–Nagymaros dam project on the Danube. In 1992, the diversion of the Danube's main flow on the Slovak side significantly reduced water levels in the Szigetköz side channels. This led to drying of wetlands and drop in groundwater, threatening the local ecology. In response, Hungary undertook measures to replenish water to the side arms and monitor environmental impacts. Research over the decades since indicates that while some wetlands have shrunk, mitigation efforts (such as a partial Danube diversion into Szigetköz side channels and habitat rehabilitation) have helped stabilize conditions to a degree.

== See also ==
- Geography of Hungary
- Little Hungarian Plain
- Žitný ostrov
