= Mária Bieliková =

Slovak computer scientist (born 1966)

- Born: Ilava, Czechoslovakia
- Education: Slovak University of Technology in Bratislava
- Awards: Order of Ľudovít Štúr, 2nd class (2024)
- Scientific career
- Fields: Computer Science
- Workplaces: KInIT; Slovak University of Technology in Bratislava

Mária Bieliková is a Slovak computer scientist who specializes in human-computer interaction and trustworthy artificial intelligence. She is the CEO of the Kempelen Institute of Intelligent Technologies (KInIT).

== Biography ==
Mária Bieliková was born in Ilava. She studied at the Slovak University of Technology in Bratislava, where she obtained the engineer degree in 1989 and PhD. in 1995. Following graduation, she became an assistant professor at the Slovak University of Technology. In 2005 she became one of the youngest full professors in Slovakia. Between 2015 and 2020 she was the dean of the Faculty of Informatics and Information Technologies of the Slovak Technical University.

In 2020 Bieliková lost the election for the second term as the dean and was subsequently fired from her professor job by her successor Ivan Kotuliak. The official grounds for termination of her employment were irregularities in accounting of payments to student research assistants. About 30 staff and several students of the Faculty of Informatics left the university in protest. In response to the protests, Kotuliak offered to restore Bieliková's professorship. Nonetheless, she turned down the offer.

Following her departure from the university, she founded the Kempelen Institute of Intelligent Technologies (KInIT), a think tank, with seed funding provided by Slovak companies active in the IT sector, including the ESET internet security company and Tatra banka.

== Service ==
Bieliková is the chair of the Slovak Permanent Committee for Ethics and Regulation of AI and a former member of the High Level Expert Group on AI established by European Commission and of the board of governors of the European Commission's Joint Research Centre.

== Awards ==
In 2010, she was awarded the Science and Technology Personality award by the Minister of Education Eugen Jurzyca. In 2016, she was awarded the IT personality of the year by the PC Revue magazine. In 2024, Bieliková was awarded the Order of Ľudovít Štúr, 2nd class by the president Zuzana Čaputová for her contributions to development of Slovakia in the scientific and technical fields.
