= Zea (singer) =

Slovak actress, model and singer (born 1991)

Alžbeta Ferencová
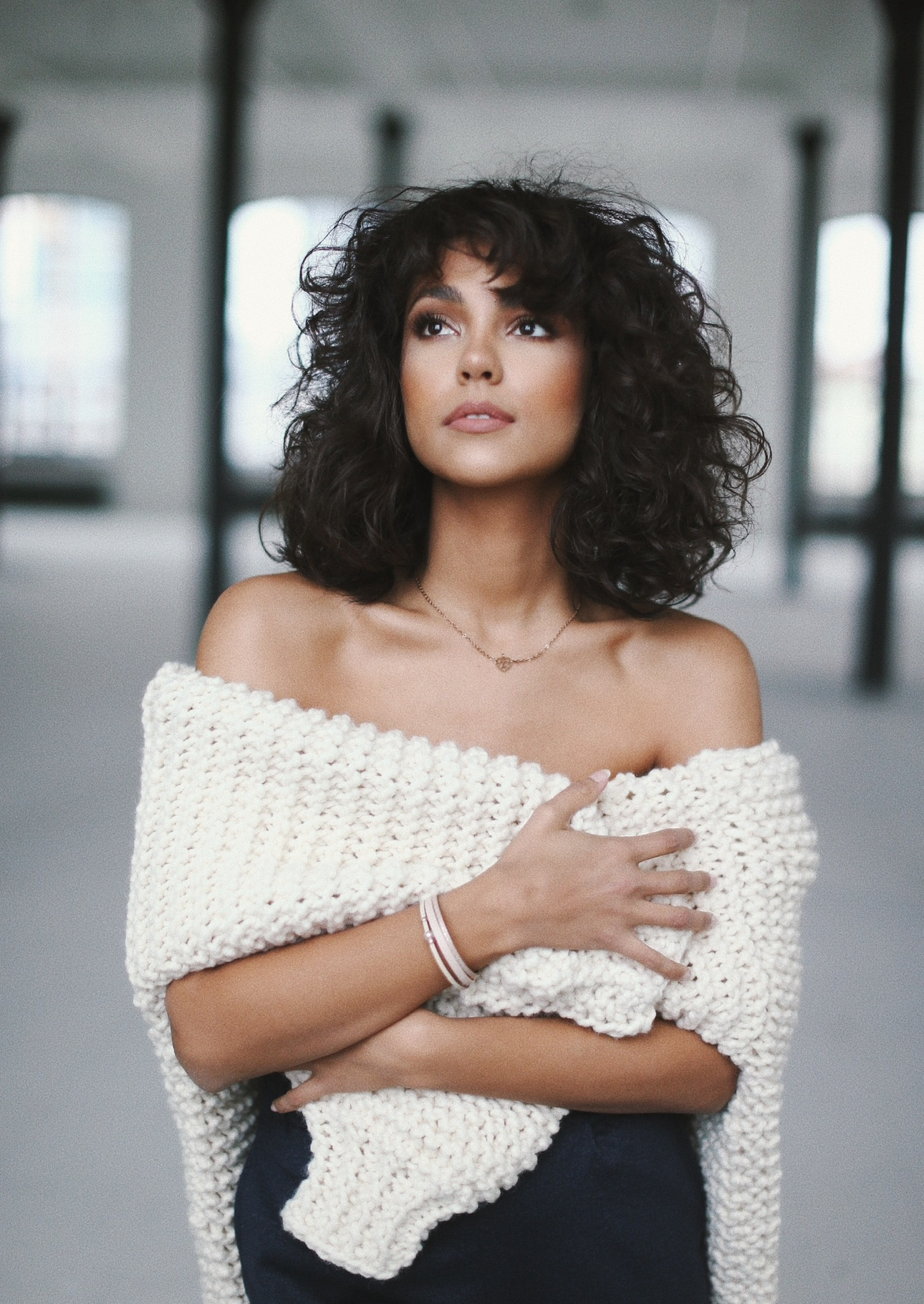
- Ferencová in 2023
- Born: 16 November 1991 (age 34); Prešov, Czechoslovakia
- Other name: Zea
- Occupations: Actress, singer, model
- Years active: 2010–present

Alžbeta Ferencová (born 16 November 1991), known professionally as Zea, is a Slovak television actress, singer, and choreographer, best known for her role as Iveta in the eponymous TV JOJ series Iveta (sk).

Zea rose to prominence with a reoccurring role in the television series Panelák, and as a hostess on TV Markíza's Wheel of Fortune. As a singer, Zea competed in Česko Slovensko má talent and later released her first album, Burning Light, as a solo artist. She began her modeling career after competing in the Miss Universe national finals at age 18, earning the title of "Miss Tip." Born and raised in Prešov, Zea is of Romani origin, and her grandmother was the first Slovak Romani writer, Elena Lacková.

== Acting ==
Ferencová appeared in TV JOJ series Panelák and starred in the series Iveta. She hosted the Slovak edition of Wheel of Fortune on TV Markíza.

On 8 February 2023, Zea was announced to join the cast of a new series on TV Markíza, the story of which is to take place on the Croatian coast. In 2024 the series was revealed as Policie Hvar.

In 2025 Zea starred in her first movie, Pod parou.

== Music career ==
In 2013, Zea competed in Česko Slovensko má talent as a member of the all-female band Foursome. After they disbanded in 2018, she started performing solo under the pseudonym Zea. In 2019, she released her debut single "Is This Love?". In 2020, she released her debut EP Burning Light.

== Modeling ==
At the age of 18, Zea competed in the national finals of the Miss Universe beauty pageant. Despite not winning, the contest was as a starting point of her modeling career, with her receiving the most called in votes and the title of "Miss Tip", allowing her to move on to the Miss Intercontinental competition.

== Personal life ==
Zea was born and raised in Prešov. Zea is of Romani origin. Her grandmother was the first Slovak Romani writer Elena Lacková.

== Discography ==
=== Singles ===
Title	Details
"Is This Love?"	Released: 2019; Format: Digital download, streaming

=== EP ===
Title	Details
Burning Light	Released: 2020; Format: Digital download, streaming

== Filmography ==
=== TV series ===
- Panelák (2008)
- Pravdivé príbehy s Katkou Brychtovou (True stories with Katka Brychtová) (2013)
- Šéfka (The Boss) (2022)
- Iveta (2022-2024)
- Policie Hvar (2024)
