= Tekovské Lužany =

Tekovské Lužany Nagysalló
- Municipality
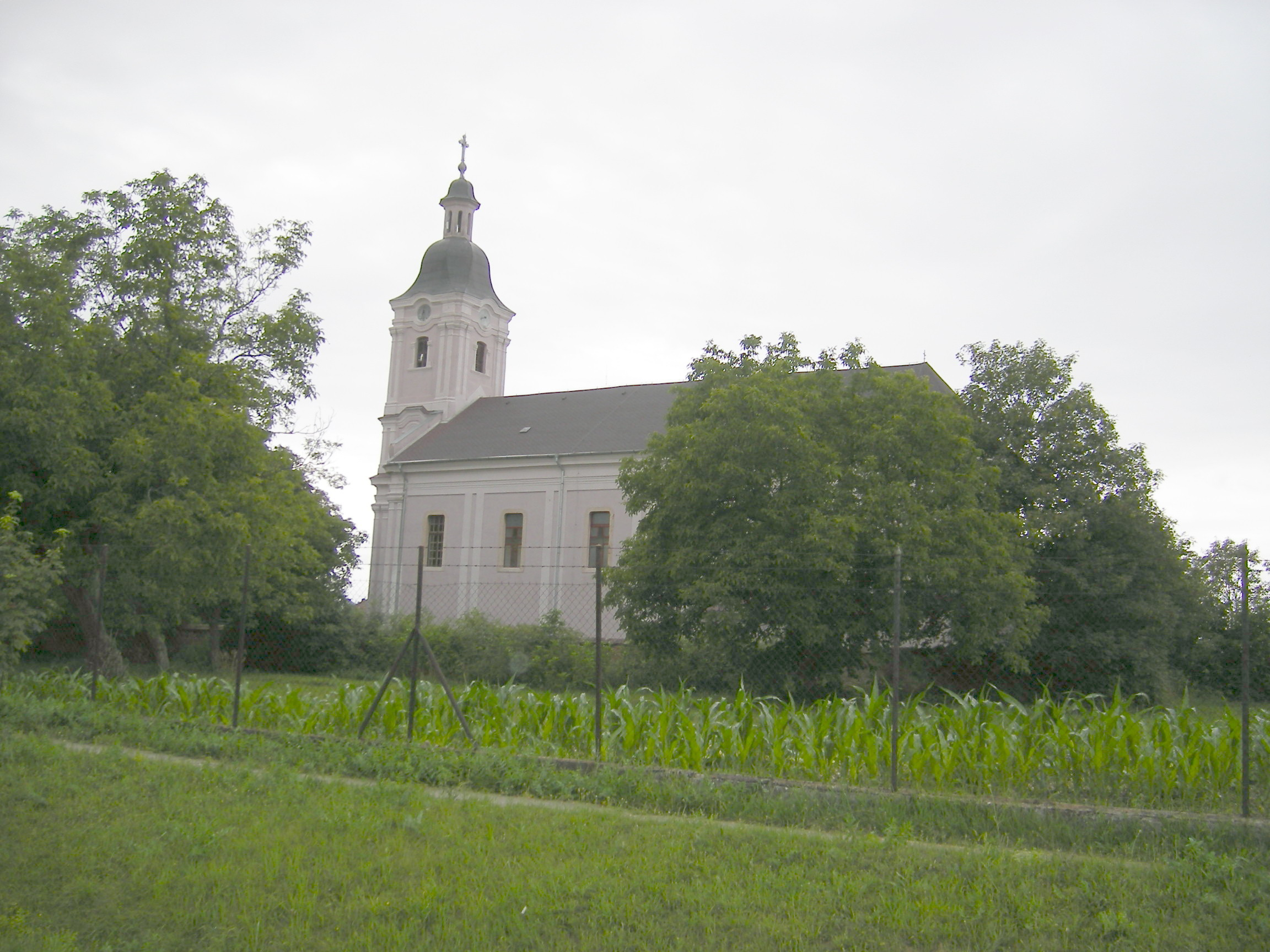
- Catholic Church in Tekovské Lužany

- Flag

- Location of Tekovské Lužany in the Nitra Region Location of Tekovské Lužany in Slovakia
- Coordinates: 48.10°N 18.53°E
- Country: Slovakia
- Region: Nitra Region
- District: Levice District
- First mentioned: 1156

Area
  - Total: 43.93 km^{2} (16.96 sq mi)
- Elevation: 152 m (499 ft)

Population (2025)
  - Total: 2,814
- Time zone: UTC+1 (CET)
  - Summer (DST): UTC+2 (CEST)
- Postal code: 935 41
- Area code: +421 36
- Vehicle registration plate (until 2022): LV
- Website: www.tekovskeluzany.sk

Tekovské Lužany (Hungarian: Nagysalló) is a village and municipality in the Levice District in the Nitra Region of Slovakia.

== History ==
In historical records the village was first mentioned in 1156. The settlement had Hungarian majority in the 17th century according to the Turkish tax census.

== Geography ==
The municipality lies at an altitude of 152 metres (499 ft) and covers an area of 43.93 km^{2} (16.96 sq mi) (2025).

== Population ==
Population statistic (10 years)
Year	1995	2005	2015	2025
Count	2877	2926	2867	2814
Difference		+1.70%	−2.01%	−1.84%

Population statistic
Year	2024	2025
Count	2825	2814
Difference		−0.38%

It has a population of 2814 people (31 December 2025).

=== Ethnicity ===
Census 2021 (1+ %)
Ethnicity	Number	Fraction
Slovak	1984	69.78%
Hungarian	725	25.5%
Not found out	224	7.87%
Total	2843	

In year 2021 was 2843 people by ethnicity 1984 as Slovak, 725 as Hungarian, 224 as Not found out, 27 as Romani, 26 as Czech, 5 as Other, 3 as Polish, 2 as Russian, 2 as English, 1 as Ukrainian, 1 as Italian, 1 as Serbian, 1 as Rusyn, 1 as German and 1 as Bulgarian.

Note on population: The difference values of population numbers in the table "Population statistic" and in the sections "Ethnicity" & "Religion" is caused by the use of various statistical methods.

=== Religion ===
Census 2021 (1+ %)
Religion	Number	Fraction
None	1083	38.09%
Roman Catholic Church	958	33.7%
Calvinist Church	304	10.69%
Not found out	206	7.25%
Evangelical Church	187	6.58%
Baptists Church	35	1.23%
Total	2843	

In year 2021 was 2843 people by religion 1083 from None, 958 from Roman Catholic Church, 304 from Calvinist Church, 206 from Not found out, 187 from Evangelical Church, 35 from Baptists Church, 18 from Greek Catholic Church, 13 from Jehovah's Witnesses, 13 from Christian Congregations in Slovakia, 7 from United Methodist Church, 5 from Ad hoc movements, 2 from Eastern Orthodox Church, 2 from Other and not ascertained christian church, 2 from Islam, 2 from Other, 2 from Buddhism, 2 from Apostolic Church, 1 from Old Catholic Church and 1 from Church of the Brethren.

== Facilities ==
The village has a public library, cinema, football pitch.

== Notable people ==
- Ivan Laluha (1932–2025), politician
