= Zlatno, Zlaté Moravce District =

Zlatno Kisaranyos
- Municipality
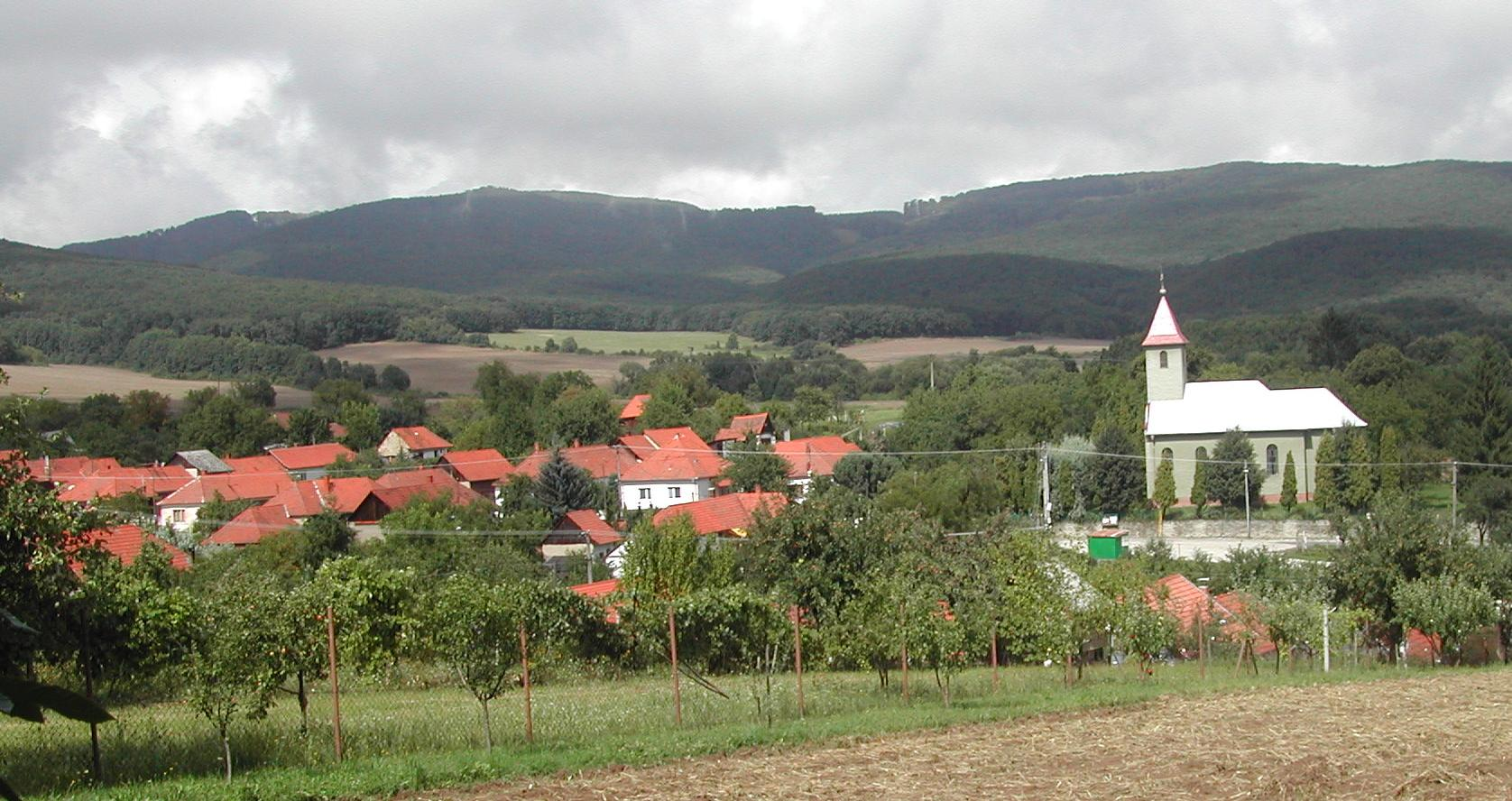
- Overall view of Zlatno

- Flag

- Location of Zlatno in the Nitra Region Location of Zlatno in Slovakia
- Coordinates: 48.465°N 18.311389°E
- Country: Slovakia
- Region: Nitra Region
- District: Zlaté Moravce District
- First mentioned: 1397

Government
  - Mayor: Róbert Šlehobr (SMER)

Area
  - Total: 15.36 km^{2} (5.93 sq mi)
- Elevation: 327 m (1,073 ft)

Population (2025)
  - Total: 192
- Time zone: UTC+1 (CET)
  - Summer (DST): UTC+2 (CEST)
- Postal code: 951 91
- Area code: +421 37
- Vehicle registration plate (until 2022): ZM
- Website: www.obeczlatno.eu

Zlatno (Hungarian: Kisaranyos) is a village and municipality in Zlaté Moravce District of the Nitra Region, in western-central Slovakia. Total municipality population was 223 inhabitants in 2011.

== Population ==
Population statistic (10 years)
Year	1995	2005	2015	2025
Count	278	254	228	192
Difference		−8.63%	−10.23%	−15.78%

Population statistic
Year	2024	2025
Count	200	192
Difference		−4%

It has a population of 192 people (31 December 2025).

=== Ethnicity ===
Census 2021 (1+ %)
Ethnicity	Number	Fraction
Slovak	207	98.1%
Total	211	

In year 2021 was 211 people by ethnicity 207 as Slovak, 2 as Not found out, 1 as Czech, 1 as Hungarian and 1 as Other.

Note on population: The difference values of population numbers in the table "Population statistic" and in the sections "Ethnicity" & "Religion" is caused by the use of various statistical methods.

=== Religion ===
Census 2021 (1+ %)
Religion	Number	Fraction
Roman Catholic Church	166	78.67%
None	41	19.43%
Not found out	3	1.42%
Total	211	

In year 2021 was 211 people by religion 166 from Roman Catholic Church, 41 from None, 3 from Not found out and 1 from Other and not ascertained christian church.

== Notable personalities ==
- Emil Benčík, Slovak writer and journalist
- Michal Lukniš, Slovak geographer and university teacher
- Michal Zaťko, Slovak hydrographer and university teacher
