= Ladislaus Bolchazy =

American classical scholar, independent academic publisher, and cultural advocate

Ladislaus Joseph Bolchazy
- Born: June 7, 1937; Michalovce, Czechoslovakia
- Died: July 28, 2012 (aged 75); Barrington, Illinois, U.S.
- Education: Divine Word College (AA 1960, Classics); St. Joseph's Seminary and College (BA 1963, Philosophy); NYU (MA 1967, Classics); SUNY Albany (PhD, 1973, Classics)
- Occupations: Classicist, publisher, cultural advocate
- Employers: Sacred Heart H.S., Yonkers, NY (1962–1965); Siena College, Loudonville, NY (1966–1967); La Salette College and Seminary, Altamont, NY (1971–1975); Millersville State College, Millersville, PA (1975–1976); Loyola University Chicago (1976–1977, 1979–2012); Bolchazy-Carducci Publishers (1978–2012); U.S. Graphics / Chicago-Scan Typographers (1985–2012)
- Title: President, Bolchazy-Carducci Pubs., Inc. (Wauconda, IL)
- Spouse: Marie Carducci
- Children: Allan (Paul Mallatt) Bolchazy
- Organizations: Slovak American Intl. Cultural Foundation; Barrington Breakfast Rotary Club
- Title: Co-founder and co-editor of Ancient World; Editor of the Classical Bulletin

Academic work
- Discipline: Classical philology
- Institutions: Loyola University of Chicago
- Notable works: "Latin for the New Millennium" (publisher, 2008) ISBN 978-0865165601; "A Concordance to the Utopia of St. Thomas More" (editor/compiler, 1978) ISBN 978-3487065144; "Illustrated Slovak History: A Struggle for Sovereignty in Central Europe" (Co-editor/publisher, 2006) ISBN 978-0865165007

Ladislaus Joseph "Lou" Bolchazy (June 7, 1937 – July 28, 2012) was an American classical scholar, independent academic publisher, and cultural advocate. He is widely respected among Classics scholars and instructors as the founder of Bolchazy-Carducci Publishers.

== Early life and education ==
Bolchazy was born in 1937 in Michalovce, Czechoslovakia. His family had their own land and raised crops and farm animals. During World War II, they experienced the violent conflict between occupying German forces and Slovak partisans. In 1949, after the communists had taken control of Czechoslovakia, the family emigrated to the United States and settled in Yonkers, New York. Bolchazy pursued studies in theology, philosophy, and the Classics at several institutions. In 1973, he completed his Ph.D. at SUNY Albany with a dissertation titled Livy's Interest in the Humanizing Role of the Law of Hospitality, which was later published as a book. Bolchazy taught at various academic institutions, including Loyola University Chicago and Millersville State College in Pennsylvania.

== Publishing ==
Bolchazy began his publishing enterprise with a new printing of the classic work Rome and Her Kings. At the time, many publishers were phasing out books in Latin. But Bolchazy wanted a way to publish books that promote the Classics and Slovak studies. High schools, colleges and homeschool programs welcomed his Classics books.

The Classical Association of the Middle West and South (CAMWS) reports that "Bolchazy-Carducci was the only firm effectively reaching out to over 3000 homeschooling [Latin] teachers with Waldo Sweet's Artes Latinae series." CAMWS also describes Bolchazy's publishing output more generally:

98 per cent of them [deal] with classical antiquity and filling significant gaps in larger press offerings by producing reprints of significant works of scholarship, class-sized texts appropriate for the new millennium, and recordings of Greek and Latin featuring the latest rules of pronunciation.

Bolchazy's company has published more than 450 titles of ancient and classic literary works. In 2008, his company launched Latin for the New Millennium, which is now among the most popular introductory Latin textbook series in the U.S.

=== Children's books ===
In 2003, Bolchazy published an edition of Green Eggs and Ham, translated into Latin by Jennifer Morrish Tunberg and Terence Tunberg (Virent Ova! Viret Perna!). This fun translation attracted some mainstream media attention. Bolchazy later published several other of Tunberg's translated children's books: How the Grinch Stole Christmas, The Cat in the Hat, and The Giving Tree.

== Cultural advocacy: Slovakia and the U.S. ==
Bolchazy founded and presided over the Slovak American International Cultural Foundation (SAICF), a non-proﬁt organization for publishing English translations of Slovak literature and promoting Slovak art.

Bolchazy believed that books could function as ambassadors from the small country of Slovakia to the rest of the world. He encouraged the Slovak Ministry of Culture to publish more of its books in English via international publishers, to raise awareness of Slovak history and culture.

Bolchazy-Carducci published a Slovak-English dictionary by Ján Šimko (1991), a collection of poems by Milan Rufus (2005), and a memoir by Slovak Cardinal Ján Chryzostom Korec (2002), "a credible and damning exposé of the fact that communist principles didn't work."

== Legacy and influence ==
=== Classical academic awards ===
At an annual meeting in 2012, the year of Bolchazy's death, scholars of the Classical Association of the Atlantic States honored him by a series of tributary presentations of Bolchazy's contributions. American Classical League President Sherwin Little gave a talk titled, "Viam inveniam aut faciam: (Note: Viam inveniam aut faciam (I'll find a way, or make a way)) Lou Bolchazy's Impact on the Teaching of Classics." Other scholars gave similar tributes.

On January 4, 2014, Bolchazy was given a Distinguished Service Award by the American Philological Association for his extraordinary service to the classics. This award is occasional rather than annual, which makes the honor distinctive.

=== Slovak national award (2007) ===
On August 31, 2007, in a ceremony at Bratislava Castle, the President of Slovakia, Ivan Gašparovič, awarded Bolchazy with the Rad Ľudovíta Štúra (Order of Ľudovít Štúr) (Note: Rad Ľudovíta Štúra III. triedy (Order of Ľudovít Štúr, third class)) for his lifelong efforts on behalf of the Slovak Republic.

=== Bolchazy Pedagogy Book Award ===
The Classical Association of the Middle West and South (CAMWS) established an annual memorial award known as the Ladislaus J. Bolchazy Pedagogy Book Award (or simply the Bolchazy Award). The Bolchazy Award is presented annually for classical books intended for use in classrooms. The criteria for this award include "effective pedagogical practice and design; and potential for broad impact."

== Opera ==
- Bolchazy, Ladislaus J. (1973). Livy's Interest in the Humanizing Role of the Law of Hospitality (Ph.D. thesis). State University of New York at Albany.
- Bolchazy, Ladislaus J. (1977). Hospitality in Antiquity: Livy's Concept of Its Humanizing Force. Chicago: Ares Publishers. ISBN 0-89005-212-3.
- More, Thomas (1978). Bolchazy, Ladislaus J. (ed.). A Concordance to the Utopia of St. Thomas More. Lubrecht & Cramer Ltd. ISBN 978-3487065144.
- Bolchazy, Ladislaus J. (1978). Myth is Truth (Radio broadcast). WLUC (Loyola University Chicago) / WRRG (Triton College).
- Bolchazy, Ladislaus J., ed. (1995). "Mystery Cults in Antiquity". The Ancient World. 15 (1–2). Ares Publications. ASIN B00AH1CSLQ.
- Bolchazy, Ladislaus J., ed. (1997). "Responsible Popularization, Part II". The Classical Bulletin. Bolchazy-Carducci Publishers. ASIN B00KK8TA3K. ISSN 0009-8337.
- Špiesz, Anton; Čaplovič, Dušan (2006). Bolchazy, Ladislaus J. (ed.). Illustrated Slovak History: A Struggle for Sovereignty in Central Europe. Wauconda, IL: Bolchazy-Carducci Publishers. ISBN 978-0-86516-500-7.
- Bolchazy, Ladislaus J. (2004). Slovak Songs in English Scores with Illustrations. Wauconda, IL: Bolchazy-Carducci Publishers. ISBN 086516567X.
- Bolchazy, Ladislaus J. (2007). Resonantia Tatrae: Selecti Cantus Populi Slovaci Latine Redditi [Resonance of the Tatras: Selected Songs of the Slovak People Rendered into Latin] (Audio CD). Bolchazy-Carducci Publishers. ISBN 9788292180006.
