= Oskár Elschek =

Slovak ethnomusicologist (1931–2026)

- Born: 16 June 1931; Bratislava, Czechoslovakia
- Died: 10 January 2026 (aged 94)
- Education: Comenius University
- Occupation: Ethnomusicologist

Oskár Elschek (16 June 1931 – 10 January 2026) was a Slovak ethnomusicologist. A member of the Academia Europaea, he was a recipient of the Order of Ľudovít Štúr (2004).

Elschek died on 10 January 2026, at the age of 94.
