= Július Binder =

Slovak politician (1931–2021)

Dr. h. c. doc. Ing. Július Binder (12 September 1931 – 26 July 2021) was a Slovak engineer and a manager who served as Movement for a Democratic Slovakia member of the Slovak parliament.

Binder was born in the former republic of Czechoslovakia. He studied at the Slovak University of Technology in Bratislava and was then active as a designer and head engineer of various construction projects.

As a director of the state firm Vodohospodárska Výstavba, he played an important role in the finalization of The Gabčíkovo – Nagymaros Dams project. He died in Bernolákovo, Slovakia.

== Honours ==
- Awarded the title Dr. h. c., the first recipient of this title, in 1994.
- Awarded the Order of Ľudovít Štúr, 1st Class in the civil division by president Michal Kováč in 1995.
- Awarded the golden double cross of the Slovak Minister of Culture in 1996.
- Pope John Paul II named him a Knight of Order of St. Gregory the Great in 2004.
- Prize for the Preservation of Cultural Heritage and the Development of the Town of Banská Štiavnica in 1997.
- Štefan Moyzes Prize in 1998.
