= Juraj Králik =

Slovak diplomat and writer (1926–2012)

- Born: 26 July 1926; Košice, Czechoslovakia (now Slovak Republic)
- Died: 24 September 2012 (aged 86); Bratislava, Slovakia
- Occupation: Diplomat

JUDr. Ing. Juraj Králik, CSc. (26 July 1926 – 24 September 2012) was a Slovak diplomat and writer, who held the function of an advisor to the UN secretary general and contributed significantly to the development of Slovak folk dance.

== Life ==
Juraj Králik was born in 1926 in Košice. 10 years later, after the First Vienna Award, his family moved to Michalovce. The family was relatively well connected socially. Králik's early upbringing was influenced by frequent visits by important personalities from among the Lutheran intelligentsia (Milan Hodža, Martin Rázus, general Ferdinand Čatloš, Elo Šándor) and various ministers.

During his studies in Michalovce Juraj Králik became a member of the Zemplín folk group. He was later conscripted for the 1st Czechoslovak Army Corps in the USSR and accepted into a reserve officer school. Later he continued his studies in Bratislava at the University of Economics and the Comenius University Law School (he graduated with honors in 1949). He also studied opera singing. Juraj Králik spoke several foreign languages, and passed state-level exams for 6 of them.

On 1 September 2006 president Ivan Gašparovič awarded Juraj Králik with the Order of Ľudovít Štúr 1st class for exceptional contributions in the area of foreign policy.

== Diplomatic career ==
After finishing his studies, Juraj Králik began working at the Legal Philosophy Institute as an assistant. He later became the acting head of the Legal Theory Institute. In 1953 he started working full-time in the area of diplomacy and was sent on his first foreign mission. From 1953 until 1960 he worked at the Czechoslovak embassy in Budapest, responsible for political intelligence. The prognoses based on his reports were shown to be very accurate. At the age of 30 and having the rank of the 1st Secretary, Juraj Králik received a state award for work excellence.

From 1963 until 1971 he held the post of ambassador to the UN, where he worked as the chairman of one of the committees of the Conference on Disarmament in Geneva.

In 1968 Králik's career was interrupted for 20 years, and he left to work out of the spotlight in the UN's Center for Environmental Protection, the Radio ecology and Nuclear Technology Usage Institute in Košice, and the Hydro meteorological Institute of Milan Rastislav Štefánik in Bratislava.

After the change of the regime, Juraj Králik returned to active diplomacy and between 1990 - 1993 returned to his former function of an ambassador to the UN. At the same time, until 1994 he worked at the post of a special adviser for disarmament under two UN secretaries general (Javier Pérez de Cuéllar and Boutros Boutros-Ghali).

Králik also held the post of the chairman of the Board of the Slovak National Center for Human Rights, the President of the International UN Society in Slovakia, an advisor to minister Eduard Kukan, and created a proposal for the creation of a Štefan Osuský Diplomatic Academy in Bratislava. He taught at the School of International Relations of the University of Economics in Bratislava and the Comenius University Law School.

== Contribution to the artistic life in Slovakia ==
In 1948 Juraj Králik contributed to the creation of the folk dance group Lúčnica and is considered to be one of its founders. He also contributed to the creation of the SĽUK.

He painted aquarels depicting the life of people in the Zemplín region and dedicated his time to singing, sport, and playing piano.

== Works ==
Juraj Králik wrote thirteen books, including the following:

- Karierny diplomat (A Professional Diplomat) - 2006
- Letokruhy diplomacie (Diplomacy Chronicles) - 2003
- Medovňik - ľubovňik abo Každy to kvitočok svuj makortet najdze - Zemlínska rapsódia
- Trójsky kôň civilizácie (The Troyan Horse of Civilization)
- Lúčnica-moja láska (Lúčnica - My Love)
- Na Zemplíne [libreto k opere] (In Zemplín [opera libretto])

== Sources ==
- http://www.sme.sk/c/2874980/zivotopisy-vyznamenanych-pri-prilezitosti-dna-ustavy-sr.html
- https://web.archive.org/web/20071030103528/http://www.slovak.cz/Default.aspx?show=Korene&type=2&clanek=1393
- https://web.archive.org/web/20110719022233/http://www.hc.sk/src/hudobny_zivot_clanok.php?hz_clid=99&hzid=106&menutyp=archiv
