= Ivan Laluha =

Slovak politician (1932–2025)

Member of the National Council
- In office 23 June 1992 – 13 December 1994

Personal details
- Born: 20 November 1932 Tekovské Lužany, Czechoslovakia
- Died: 21 July 2025 (aged 92)
- Party: Communist Party of Czechoslovakia (until 1970); Public Against Violence (1990–1992); Movement for a Democratic Slovakia (1992–1994); Social Democratic Party of Slovakia (1995–1996)
- Children: 2
- Education: University of Belgrade; Lomonosov University
- Awards: Order of Ľudovít Štúr, 2nd class (2002)

Ivan Laluha (20 November 1932 – 21 July 2025) was a Slovak politician.

== Life and career ==
=== Early life ===
Ivan Laluha was born on 20 November 1932 in the village of Tekovské Lužany in the Levice District. He was educated at the grammar school in Zvolen and as a convinced communist aimed to study at the Moscow State Institute of International Relations. Nonetheless, after arriving to the Soviet Union, the university temporarily paused acceptance of foreign applicants and Laluha and other Czechoslovak students were transferred to the Odesa University, where Laluha studied history. In the fourth year he transferred to the Lomonosov University.

After graduation, Laluha was unable to find a job as alumni of Soviet universities were seen as influenced by Khrushchev's reformist thinking. Nonetheless, due to his father's connections, he was appointed as a professor of Marxism–Leninism at the newly established Technical University in Zvolen. However, he soon departed after being accused of Trotskyism by the head of his department.

After leaving the university job, he was assigned by the Communist party as a commissar to improve the morale of workers repairing a train tunnel in nearby Kremnica. After a short stay in Kremnica, he managed to secure an appointment as a professor at the Bratislava University of Economics and Business, where he remained active for the rest of his life. In 1969 he was awarded a doctorate in sociology at the University of Belgrade.

=== Political career ===
Laluha was a staunch supporter of the Prague Spring reforms and the reformist Communist party leader Alexander Dubček. After the Warsaw Pact invasion of Czechoslovakia, he was expelled from the Party. Following the Velvet Revolution, Laluha became a deputy of the Federal Assembly as a representative of the Public Against Violence movement. After the Dissolution of Czechoslovakia, Laluha became an MP of the National Council of Slovakia. Following the collapse of the Public Against Violence, Laluha became a member of the Movement for a Democratic Slovakia. In 1994, he joined the Social Democratic Party of Slovakia, which failed to pass the representation threshold resulting in Laluha losing his parliament seat.

=== Personal life and death ===
Laluha was married to Oľga Laluhová, a medical doctor. They had two children – daughter Ivana (born 1963) and son Ján (born 1969). He died on 21 July 2025, at the age of 92.

== Awards and honours ==
In 2002, he was awarded the Order of Ľudovít Štúr, 2nd class by the president of Slovakia Rudolf Schuster.
