= Senné, Veľký Krtíš District =

Senné Nógrádszenna
- Municipality
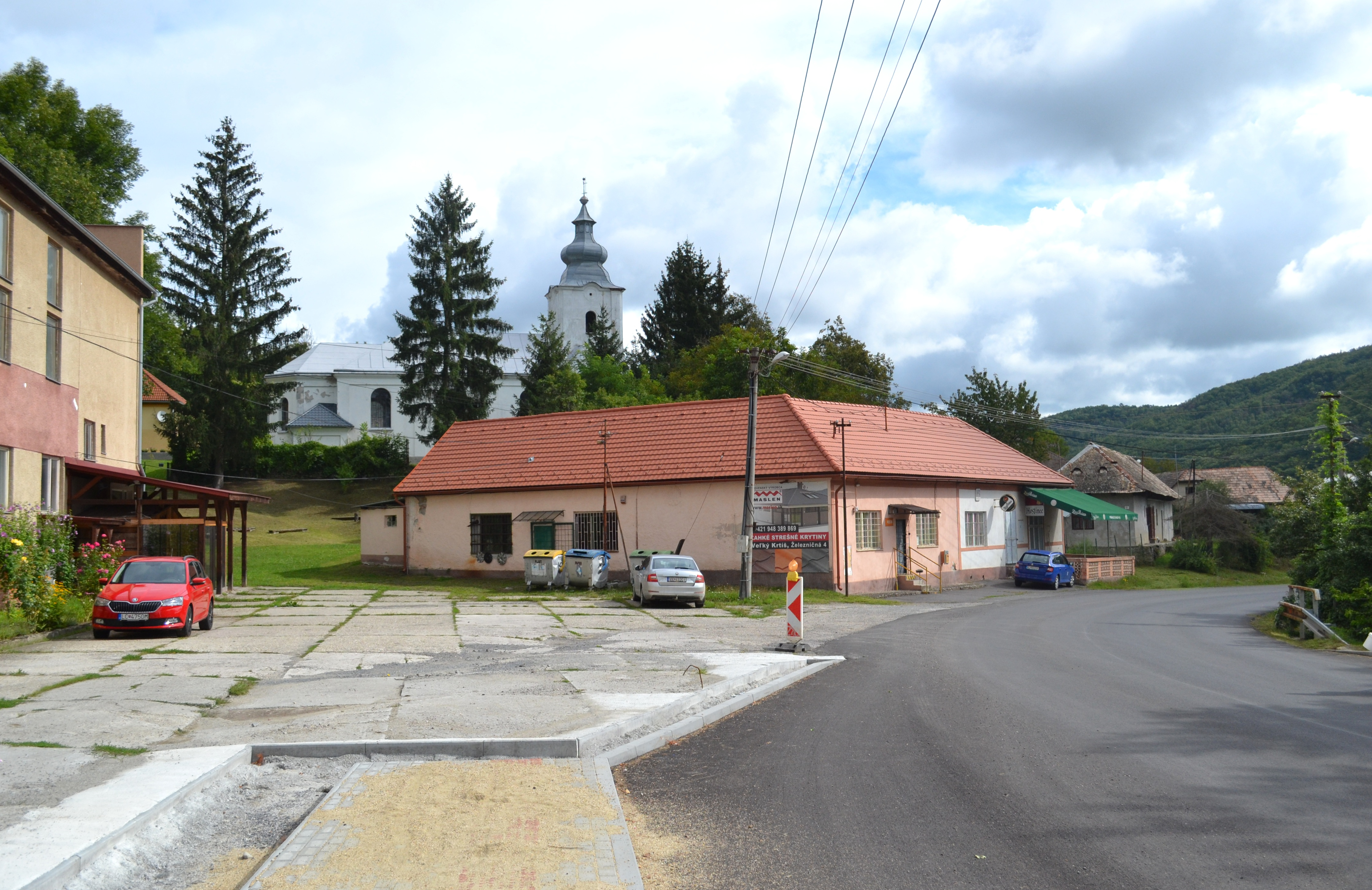

- Flag

- Location of Senné in the Banská Bystrica Region Location of Senné in Slovakia
- Coordinates: 48.31°N 19.40°E
- Country: Slovakia
- Region: Banská Bystrica Region
- District: Veľký Krtíš District
- First mentioned: 1249

Government
  - Mayor: Ján Gabera (HLAS–SD)

Area
  - Total: 15.88 km^{2} (6.13 sq mi)
- Elevation: 268 m (879 ft)

Population (2025)
  - Total: 191
- Time zone: UTC+1 (CET)
  - Summer (DST): UTC+2 (CEST)
- Postal code: 991 01
- Area code: +421 47
- Vehicle registration plate (until 2022): VK
- Website: www.senne.sk

Senné (Hungarian: Nógrádszenna) is a village and municipality in the Veľký Krtíš District of the Banská Bystrica Region of southern Slovakia.

== Population ==
Population statistic (10 years)
| Year | 1995 | 2005 | 2015 | 2025 |
|---|---|---|---|---|
| Count | 235 | 227 | 222 | 191 |
| Difference | | −3.40% | −2.20% | −13.96% |

Population statistic
| Year | 2024 | 2025 |
|---|---|---|
| Count | 194 | 191 |
| Difference | | −1.54% |

It has a population of 191 people (31 December 2025).

=== Ethnicity ===
Census 2021 (1+ %)
| Ethnicity | Number | Fraction |
|---|---|---|
| Slovak | 184 | 96.84% |
| Romani | 3 | 1.57% |
| Not found out | 2 | 1.05% |
| Total | 190 | |

In year 2021 was 190 people by ethnicity 184 as Slovak, 3 as Romani, 2 as Not found out, 1 as Czech and 1 as Serbian.

Note on population: The difference values of population numbers in the table "Population statistic" and in the sections "Ethnicity" & "Religion" is caused by the use of various statistical methods.

=== Religion ===
Census 2021 (1+ %)
| Religion | Number | Fraction |
|---|---|---|
| Evangelical Church | 102 | 53.68% |
| Roman Catholic Church | 56 | 29.47% |
| None | 24 | 12.63% |
| Not found out | 2 | 1.05% |
| United Methodist Church | 2 | 1.05% |
| Ad hoc movements | 2 | 1.05% |
| Total | 190 | |

In year 2021 was 190 people by religion 102 from Evangelical Church, 56 from Roman Catholic Church, 24 from None, 2 from Not found out, 2 from United Methodist Church, 2 from Ad hoc movements, 1 from Eastern Orthodox Church and 1 from Christian Congregations in Slovakia.
