= Branislav Varsik =

Slovak historian (1904–1994)

- Born: March 5, 1904; Myjava, Austria-Hungary
- Died: May 28, 1994 (aged 90); Slovakia

Branislav Varsik (5 March 1904, Myjava, Austria-Hungary – 28 May 1994, Slovakia) was a Slovak historian and archivist, his major contribution was to the research of the hussite movement on the territory of present-day Slovakia and history of the settlement.

== Selected works ==
- Slováci na pražskej univerzite do konca stredoveku [Slovaks at the University of Prague until the end of the Middle Ages] (1926)
- Husiti a reformácia na Slovensku do žilinskej synody [Hussites and Reformation in Slovakia before the Synod of Žilina] (1932, habilitation work)
- Národnostný problém trnavskej univerzity [The National Problem of Trnava University] (1938)
- Národnostná hranica slovensko-maďarská v ostatných dvoch storočiach [The Slovak-Hungarian national border in the last two centuries] (1940)
- Slovenské listy a listiny z 15. a 16. stor. [Slovak Letters and Documents of the 15th and 16th Centuries.] (1956, doktorská práca)
- Osídlenie Košickej kotliny I.-III. [Settlement of the Košice basin I.-III.] (1964, 1973, 1977)
- Husitské revolučné hnutie a Slovensko [Hussite Revolutionary Movement and Slovakia] (1965)
- Zo slovenského stredoveku [From the Slovak Middle Ages] (1972)
- Z osídlenia západného a stredného Slovenska v stredoveku [About the Settlement of Western and Central Slovakia in the Middle Ages] (1984)

== Awards ==
- 1963 – Gold Medal of Comenius University
- 1963 – Honour Badge of Labour
- 1974 – Gold Honor Plaque of Slovak Academy of Sciences of Ľudovít Štúr for Contributions in Social Sciences
- 1976 – National Award of Slovak Socialistic Republic
- 1979 – Silver medal of Slovak Academy of Sciences
- 2007 – Order of Ľudovít Štúr, 1st Class in memoriam
