= Ján Stanislav =

Slovak historian and linguist (1904–1977)

Ján Stanislav (12 December 1904, Liptovský Ján, Austria-Hungary – 29 July 1977, Liptovský Mikuláš, Czechoslovakia) was a Slovak linguist and specialist in Slavic studies.

== Life ==
He was born in Liptovský Ján in December 1904. Stanislav studied Slavic studies and Romance studies at the Comenius University in Bratislava, but also at the universities in Paris, Kraków and Ljubljana. He graduated from Faculty of Philosophy of Comenius University in Bratislava in 1928. Then he worked as an assistant and a docent at the Slavic Seminar of the university. In 1936, he became a professor of comparative Slavic linguistics and Old Church Slavonic. He dealt with linguistic and cultural conditions in the Great Moravia, but also with Slovak historical grammar, the earliest history of Slovak language and Slovaks. The name of Jan Stanislav Institute of Slavistics of Slovak Academy of Sciences pays honours to his work.

== Selected works ==
- 1932 Liptovské nárečia [The Dialects of Liptov].
- 1935 Pôvod východoslovenských nárečí [The Origin of Eastern Slovak Dialects]
- 1933 Československá mluvnica A Czechoslovak Grammar
- 1948 Slovenský juh v stredoveku [The Slovak South in the Middle Ages] (2 volumes)
- 1955–1962 Slovenská historická gramatika [A Historic Slovak Grammar]
- 1956–1973 Dejiny slovenského jazyka [A History of the Slovak Language] (5 volumes)
- 1978, 1987 Starosloviensky jazyk I. – II. [Old Church Slavonic I. – II.]

== Awards ==
- 2005 Order of Ľudovít Štúr (in memoriam)
