= Vojtech Zamarovský =

Slovak historian and writer (1919–2006)

Vojtech Zamarovský (5 October 1919 in Zamarovce – 26 July 2006 in Prague) was a Slovak writer of historical non-fiction literature. He also translated from English, German, French and Latin.

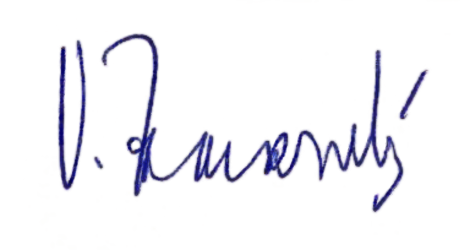
Signature of Vojtech Zamarovský

After studying law and economics in Bratislava and Prague, Zamarovský moved to Prague and worked in several state offices. From 1956 on he worked only as a writer. His books concentrated on the life of ancient Mediterranean nations. He wrote both in the Slovak and Czech languages. Zamarovský became immensely popular in Czechoslovakia, and his works were also translated abroad.

During his final years, he suffered from Parkinson's disease and spent the last two months of his life in a coma.

== Major works ==
Books (with literal English translations):

- Bohovia a hrdinovia antických bájí (1969) [Gods and heroes of ancient myths] - a dictionary of ancient Greek and Roman mythology
- Bohovia a králi starého Egypta (1986) [Gods and kings of ancient Egypt] - history of ancient Egypt
- Dejiny písané Rímom (1971) [History written by Rome] - history of the Roman Empire
- Grécky zázrak (1974) [The Greek wonder] - history of ancient Greece
- Ich veličenstvá pyramídy (1977) [Their Majesties, the pyramids] - on Egyptian pyramids
- Na počiatku bol Sumer (1966) [At the beginning, there was Sumer] - history of the Sumerians
- Objavenie Tróje (1962) [The discovery of Troy] - history of archaeological excavations in Troy and an explanation of old Greek epics and mythology
- Vzkriesenie Olympie (1978) [Resurrection of Olympia] - history of the Olympic Games
- Za siedmimi divmi sveta (1960) [Quest of the Seven Wonders of the World] - description of ancient monuments and of the corresponding cultures
- Za tajemstvím říše Chetitů (1961) [Quest of the Mystery of the Empire of the Hittites] - a homage to Bedřich Hrozný, who was the first to decipher Hittite language (therefore the book was written in Czech first)

TV series (13 episodes):

- Veľké civilizácie staroveku [Great Civilizations of Ancient Times]
