= Orders, decorations, and medals of Slovakia =

Slovakia has a system of orders and decorations for citizens who do great deeds for the country. With the exception of the Order of the White Double Cross, all the orders are reserved for Slovak citizens. Below is a list of national decorations, in order of importance:

== Order of the White Double Cross ==
The Order of the White Double Cross is conferred only upon foreign citizens:

- for the comprehensive development of relations between the state whose citizens they are, and the Slovak Republic
- for the empowerment of the Slovak Republic's position in international relations
- for meeting the foreign policy priorities of Slovakia
- for otherwise outstanding achievement in the benefit of the Slovak Republic
- for the outstanding spread of the good reputation of Slovakia abroad

The medal of this order consists of a double white cross on a red background; the ribbon is blue with a red central stripe. The Order of the White Double Cross is divided into three classes: 1st, 2nd, and 3rd.

== Order of Andrej Hlinka ==
The Order of Andrej Hlinka, named after the Slovak priest and politician, is conferred upon Slovak citizens "for special merit in the establishment of the Slovak Republic". It is symbolized by a medallion with a central white cross pattée; Hlinka's profile is in the center of the cross. The ribbon is blue with a central stripe. The Order of Andrej Hlinka is divided into three classes: 1st, 2nd, and 3rd.

== Order of Ľudovít Štúr ==
The Order of Ľudovít Štúr, named after the Slovak poet, philosopher, politician, and writer, is conferred upon Slovak citizens:

- for defending Slovak democracy and its development
- for defending human rights and freedoms
- for the defense and security of the Slovak Republic
- for special achievements in politics, management, and governance of the country
- for development of the economy, local authority, science and technology, education, culture, arts, sports, and social affairs
- for spreading the good reputation of Slovakia abroad

The medal of this order consists of Štúr's head on a red background; the ribbon is half white, half red, with a blue central stripe. The Order of Ľudovít Štúr is divided into three classes: 1st, 2nd, and 3rd.

== Milan Rastislav Štefánik Cross ==
The Milan Rastislav Štefánik Cross, named after the Slovak politician, aviator, and astronomer, is awarded to Slovak citizens "for risking their life to defend Slovakia, for risking their life to save another person's life, or for risking their life to save material values". The medal consists of Štefánik's head on a pale blue background; the ribbon is pale blue. The Milan Rastislav Štefánik Cross is divided into three classes: 1st, 2nd, and 3rd.

== Pribina Cross ==
The Pribina Cross, named after the 9th-century prince of Nitra, is awarded to Slovak citizens for "special merit for economic, social, or cultural development of the Slovak Republic". The medal consists of Pribina's head on a red background; the ribbon is dark red with a central crown. The Pribina Cross is divided into three classes: 1st, 2nd, and 3rd.

== Medal of the President of the Slovak Republic ==
The Medal of the President of the Slovak Republic is awarded to Slovak and foreign citizens:

- for significant merit in the management and governance of the country
- for development of the defense and security of Slovakia
- for development of the economy, local authority, science and technology, education, culture, arts, sport, and social affairs
- for spreading the good reputation of Slovakia abroad

== Medal for Bravery ==
The Medal for Bravery is awarded to Slovak soldiers "for military bravery or valor".

== Cross of the President of the Slovak Republic ==
The Cross of the President of the Slovak Republic, controversially established in 2001 by president Rudolf Schuster, is awarded for "extraordinary merits to the Slovak Republic, its establishment, development, and good name abroad; for the observance and protection of fundamental rights and freedoms; for the development of democracy, including ensuring the proper functioning of constitutional bodies; for development, especially in the fields of defense and security, economy, science, and technology; in the social field; in the fields of education, culture, art, and sport; and for saving human life and material values". The decoration was discontinued in 2004, upon the end of Schuster's presidency. It was divided into two classes.

== Medal for Services to Slovak Diplomacy ==
The Medal for Services to Slovak Diplomacy is the highest decoration of the Slovak Ministry of Foreign and European Affairs. It is awarded for merits to foreign affairs.
