= Jozef Roháč =

Slovak criminal

Jozef Roháč (born September 6, 1956), also known under the alias Potkan, is a Slovak criminal specializing in explosives. He is mostly known for installing the explosive device in the assassination of Róbert Remiáš and in assassinations of numerous organized crime bosses in Slovakia and Hungary. According to newspaper SME, Roháč had at some point connections to both the Slovak and Hungarian Secret Services. Despite international search by the Interpol, he managed to evade the law for 9 years.

A career criminal for most of his life, in 1984 Roháč was sentenced to 15 years for terrorism under communist Czechoslovakia for kidnapping the Deputy Minister of Health and attempting to take him out of the country. Later, he became the first prisoner ever to escape from Ilava prison. Soon re-captured, he became one of the organizers of the 1989 Leopoldov Prison mutiny. He was released in 1990 because of a wide-ranging amnesty by President Václav Havel.

In April 2011, Roháč was extradited to Hungary, where he faced charges for multiple assassinations: Ferenc Domák, pander in 1996, János Fenyő, media magnate in 1998, and Tamás Boros, mafia boss in 1998. In the latter crime three bystanders were also killed in the explosion. In March 2016 the attorney requested lifetime imprisonment for Roháč in a joint trial of his crimes.

== Name ==
Jozef Roháč is identified in the Slovak media as Potkan (lit. 'rat'), his other alias being Čiapočka (lit. 'little hood'). The following identities have been used by Roháč in the past: Josef Fink; Miloš Lukáč (before 1989); Milan Lupták.

== Early life ==
Jozef Roháč was born in Levice, Czechoslovakia and as of today, he still has his official residence listed here. He was one of five siblings and his father was an alcoholic, who beat the children, although not very often. In his own words, his childhood was not particularly happy and he used to get often into fights. Later, he started a career of petty crime: "fights, alcohol, badmouthing the communist regime, policemen and suspended sentences" recalls Roháč in the early 1990s.

== Career under communism ==
Jozef Roháč committed his first high-profile crime in 1985, in communist Czechoslovakia, when armed, he kidnapped the Deputy Minister of Health to negotiate the crossing of the border to escape from the country.

He was 29 years old at that time, having just finished serving the compulsory military service in Czechoslovakia. After officially asking for the permit to travel to Austria, Roháč was openly speaking about staying there. His permit was denied and two policemen came to his home and confiscated his passport. Together with a friend he obtained two guns and they both stumbled upon the Deputy Minister of Health Kováč, kidnapping him immediately. They got stuck, however at the Petržalka-Berg border crossing, where they were surrounded by the police. Roháč later claimed that he decided to surrender after Kováč's health had begun deteriorating in the car due to missing pharmaceuticals.

Jaroslav Toman, husband of future Minister of Labour of Slovakia Viera Tomanová, who worked as a high ranking police officer in Bratislava at that time was one of the engaging policemen and Roháč's bullet allegedly missed him only narrowly. Toman's witness account served as a basis to accuse Roháč of the intent to kill, which Roháč denied. For his actions, Toman was awarded a medal for protecting the borders of the Czechoslovak Socialist Republic. Despite the whole incident was declared a state secret, Toman immediately told his wife. The story was broken by TV JOJ in 2008. When interviewing Tomanová, she declared that her husband was scared of Roháč for the rest of his life and that her whole family was threatened at that time.

Jozef Roháč was sentenced to 15 years for terrorism, starting his sentence in Ilava. He became the only person under communism ever to escape from Ilava prison, earning him respect among other prisoners. He was eventually re-captured and another four years in prison were added on top of his original sentence. During his subsequent stay in prison, he started writing poetry. He claims he was regularly beaten in Leopoldov Prison.

== Career after 1989 ==
=== Leopoldov prison mutiny ===
Jozef Roháč was one of the organizers of the Leopoldov Prison mutiny in 1990 and he was one of the few prisoners to negotiate directly with the Federal Minister of Interior at that time, Ján Langoš.

Already notorious and respected prisoner because of his successful escape from Ilava prison, Jozef Roháč bolstered his reputation also by an incident where he was brutally beaten by prison guards after talking to some prisoners, yet he refused to even tell them who he was speaking with.

After his release from Leopoldov Prison, Roháč continued his criminal career. A short time after being released, he helped his brother privatize some buildings using coercion, an act he admitted in a later interview.

Over the years, Roháč became known in the Slovak underground as an expert on explosive devices. He earned a reputation of professionalism in planning, preparation, realization and evidence removal and he was known to have a 100% success rate (although there is at least one publicized case of one of his explosive devices falling off the car allowing the target to survive).

=== Assassination of Róbert Remiáš ===
Róbert Remiáš, an ex-police officer, was the person through which Oskar Fegyveres communicated in a key political lawsuit of the 1990s Slovakia. Fegyveres was an ex-secret agent who gave testimony in the case of kidnapping of the son of the President of Slovakia, Michal Kováč Jr., into Austria. Fegyveres described the involvement of Prime Minister Vladimír Mečiar and Director of Slovak Information Service Ivan Lexa in this crime. As of 1996, Fegyveres was already in hiding and communicated only through his close friend, Róbert Remiáš.

The deputy director of Slovak Information Service Jaroslav Svěchota gave the order to assassinate Remiáš to the boss of Bratislava mafia at that time, Miroslav Sýkora. Svěchota knew Sýkora personally, both men met regularly. According to the original lawsuit, Sýkora delegated the hit to Jozef Roháč and Imrich Oláh. According to the head of investigators at that time, they were helped by two other unidentified men, one of them a member of the Slovak Information Service. Roháč placed an explosive device under Remiáš's car, attaching it at the rear axle. The car exploded on Karloveská Street in Karlova Ves, Bratislava on April 29, 1996. The explosion did not kill Remiáš immediately, as evidenced by fumes found in his lungs and witness accounts of hearing him scream, but he did die shortly after.

Bratislava regional prosecution, complying with the investigator, dropped the charges against Jozef Roháč and Imrich Oláh in 2006 in relation to the murder of Róbert Remiáš.

=== Assassinations of Róbert Holub and Štefan Fabián ===
Róbert Holub was a young mafia boss from Košice with contacts in the Slovak Information Service. He was active in the whole region of Eastern Slovakia. It is generally believed that the boss of all Slovak bosses Mikuláš Černák was contacted by some of his associates from the region who wanted to seize Holub's lucrative businesses and paid for his assassination. Černák planned to replace Holub with his underboss Karol Kolárik, whom he deemed more loyal. The first attempt to assassinate Holub in the spring of 1997 failed after a group of Černák's armed henchmen got caught by the police while leaving their house to do the job. Following this failure, two mafia hitmen were hired to pose as police officers to lure Holub out of his house and murder him. On their way to Holub's residence, the two noticed a car they thought was following them and decided to abort the operation. The third attempt was carried out on September 22, 1997, by Roháč. He was a pillion passenger on a motorcycle ridden by Alojz Kromka that approached Holub at a gas station in Košice. Roháč pulled out his Škorpion submachine gun, aimed at Holub but the gun jammed. They escaped but Holub recognized Kromka because the two shared passion for motorcycles and occasionally rode together in the past. His gang failed to find him so they kidnapped his brother Ján and tortured him. Ján did not know about his brother's whereabouts nor was involved in any of his illegal activities. After the unsuccessful interrogation Holub's associate Štefan Fabián shot Ján dead.

Černák was growing impatient and decided to set a trap. He invited Holub to Bratislava claiming he would provide him Alojz Kromka's whereabouts. Holub arrived at hotel Danube on September 24, 1997, and in the evening entered the hotel bar to meet Černák. He was seated at one table with Černák and Fabián. All but one of Holub's bodyguards remained outside in their cars and the only one who entered the bar together with Holub and Fabián was quietly taken aside by Černák's people. Several minutes later masked Roháč entered the bar and started shooting at Holub and Fabián from a semi-automatic pistol. Fabián dropped dead on the spot, but Holub survived despite being hit 4 times. Roháč and the other Černák's gang members present at the scene threw their guns in one of the flower pots in front of the hotel and fled. Holub was rushed to Kramáre hospital where doctors saved his life. On October 5 masked Roháč used a ladder to climb up the roof of the hospital. He then walked closer to Holub's room and started shooting at him through the window. Holub died after being hit 4 times in his head. Černák later confessed to organizing the murder.

=== Assassination of Eduard Dinič ===
On February 6, 1997, a group of assassins killed the ruling boss of local mafia Miroslav Sýkora in front of the Holliday Inn hotel in Bratislava. Brothers Eduard and Róbert Dinič expected Sýkora's group to disintegrate soon after the death of their boss and wanted to succeed them as the leading criminal group in Bratislava. They were best known for their racketeering business and for their part in the Privatization in Slovakia under Prime Minister Vladimír Mečiar. But Sýkora's well-respected aide Róbert Lališ immediately replaced him as the new boss of his group. Lališ was aware that their competitors would try to take advantage of Sýkora's death and wanted to demonstrate his determination to keep his group dominant. The Dinič brothers immediately became his main target and Lališ instructed Roháč to carry out their assassinations.

On May 9, 1998, an explosion equivalent to 5 kilograms of TNT killed Eduard Dinič near Zlaté piesky in Bratislava, some minutes before 8 pm. Dinič was aware his life was in danger and he was already preparing to go into hiding and on this day, he wanted to go play tennis for the last time before heading out of the country. Roháč placed the explosives underneath concrete tiling of the narrow pavement leading to the tennis courts where Dinič was known to cross. The device was remotely detonated at the very moment Dinič was above. Pieces of human tissue were collected by the police from the radius of 150 meters and the blast created a hole several meters deep.

When it came off, I thought it's the end of the world. I saw a torso without head falling down on the tennis courts. A hand was lying some 100 meters away from the point of explosion. I am used to various things but when I saw this, I had to go buy myself half a liter of borovička.

— Unnamed eyewitness interviewed by newspaper Pravda after the explosion

According to Slovak police pyrotechnic Miroslav Gona, who was attending the crime scene, the killer must have been nearby, at a place where he could see the scene clearly. The explosive device was detonated remotely using probably a pager, remote control from garage doors or a cell phone, but those were still not widespread in Slovakia at that time. According to Gona, the device was at least 1 meter underneath the pavement which suggests large-scale construction work at this place. Apparently, no one noticed the preparation.

In December 1999, Slovak police interrupted investigation in this case. According to Alena Toševová from the Regional Police Directorship in Bratislava, "investigation was interrupted because there were no findings allowing to press charges against any individuals". Slovak investigators were not able to find out what kind of explosive device was used. This placement of explosives is unique in Slovakia, in all prior mafia hits using explosives, the device was always placed in the car of the victim or in a car parked nearby.

=== Assassination of Róbert Dinič ===
Róbert Dinič openly said that he would seek revenge for his brother's death, but outlived him by only 4 months. He was divorced and regularly visited his ex-wife's house on Pribišová street in Bratislava to pick up or drop off their two daughters. Lališ knew about it and instructed his men to park a van in front of the house to observe Dinič. On October 4, 1998, at about 7:40 pm. Jozef Roháč and Ivan Cupper stormed out of the van and opened fire from their submachine guns at Dinič and his bodyguard Marián Fojtík as they entered Róbert's car. Fojtík was shot 7 times, Dinič 19 times. Both were dead at the scene. The assassins then detonated the van and escaped in another car that was later found charred in a forest near Malacky. With Róbert's death, the Dinič group practically ceased to exist.

=== Assassination of József Prisztás ===
On November 1, 1996, Hungarian millionaire József Prisztás was gunned down in Budapest as he was getting into his car. The perpetrator has left on a bicycle. Roháč admitted to the assassination in 2018 to Hungarian police. The order came from 1990s prominent Hungarian mafia boss Tamás Portik.

=== Assassination of Tamás Boros ===
On July 2, 1998, Roháč assassinated local mafia boss Tamás Boros in Budapest. Roháč placed the explosives underneath a Fiat vehicle parked outside Aranykéz Street No. 2 in the center of the city. The device exploded when Boros was nearby, killing not only him but also 3 unconnected bystanders (including a 24-year-old woman) and injuring 20 – 25 others including foreign nationals. It was the first time in the history of Hungary that innocent bystanders died in mafia activities. The Budapest Police Headquarters suspected Jozef Roháč and other gang members of committing the attack, however, the investigation ended in 2002 as it failed to provide evidence.

=== Attempted assassination of Ivo Ružič ===
At the beginning of 2000s a gang known as Takáčovci thrived in the Ružinov borough in Bratislava. Róbert Lališ believed them to jeopardize the illegal activities of his own Sýkorovci gang. After a prominent member of Sýkorovci Peter Havasi died shortly after an assassination attempt in 2004, Lališ, who blamed Takáčovci (although their members have been acquitted in 2016) decided to revenge Havasi by murdering a high-ranking member of their group. He picked Ivo Ružič, however, Ružič usually drove black Mercedes G they believed was armored which made the assassination very complicated. Ružič frequented a bar called Astra so Lališ decided to plant an explosive device next to the entrance and hired Roháč to do this job. For this purpose, Lališ's men even used a hidden camera to record Ružič's patterns of behavior and constructed a door overhang to hide the explosive. But Ružič unexpectedly stopped visiting Astra after the bomb had been planted. Lališ decided to make the assassination preparations at a place called Jadran where Ružič had his office. Roháč observed the place masked as a jogger or cyclist. An equivalent of 2 – 3 kilograms of TNT was magnetically attached next to the back entrance to Jadran. Roháč remotely detonated the explosive device on December 2, 2004, at about 1 p.m. when Ružič approached the door accompanied by his bodyguards. The explosion was so powerful that the whole wall collapsed on Ružič. He and his two bodyguards survived the explosion but suffered multiple serious injuries and partial hearing loss. Another 6 people were injured and 20 cars damaged.

=== Other notable crimes ===
- Assassination of Daler Hlavačka, member of Ukrainian mafia in Slovakia.
- Assassination of Roman Deák, controversial entrepreneur from Bratislava, Slovakia.
- Assassination of Jozef Kucmerko, an organized crime boss from Dubnica, Slovakia.
- Budapest Police believe that the gang led by Roháč was responsible for bomb attacks against the headquarters of the Fidesz party and of the Independent Smallholders' Party, and against the homes of two members of parliament in Budapest in the spring and summer of 1998.

=== Legal issues ===
Jozef Roháč was arrested in Hungary in 2008 on charges of an attempted assassination of businessman Zoltan Seres in June 1997 and finished serving his sentence in October 2010. Roháč's fingerprints were found on the device that dislodged from the bottom of Seres' car and failed to go off. The police could not secure enough evidence for a prosecutor to push for a prepared execution of Zoltan Seres, which would carry much higher sentences, he was only sentenced to 2 years in prison and 3 years of being persona non grata in Hungary. Roháč was released on October 26, 2010.

After his release from prison, a DNA sample taken back in 2008 was finally matched with samples left behind by the suspected assassin of Hungarian media mogul János Fenyő in 1998. On May 4, 2011, the Chief Prosecutor's Office in Budapest has launched an inquiry into delays in identifying the DNA after recently refusing to accept an explanation by the National Bureau of Investigation. In Hungary, DNA samples taken from criminals must be automatically matched with unidentified samples taken at past crime scenes. According to the newspaper Népszabadság, it is not yet clear whether the delay was caused by police or another authority.

== In culture ==
- Jozef Roháč is featured in the 1994 textbook Násilí (Violence) compiled by known Slovak sociologist and former VPN chairman Fedor Gál with other authors. One chapter is essentially a transcription of tape records of an interview conducted by Gál with Roháč probably in early 1993.
- A book Jozef Roháč – štvrťstoročie na úteku (Jozef Roháč – quarter-century on the run) by Slovak journalist Martin Mózer was published in 2010. The book has 328 pages and is written in Slovak.

== See also ==
- Crime in Slovakia
- Prisons in Slovakia
- Slovak Information Service
- Nemzetbiztonsági Hivatal
