= Jaroslav Svěchota =

Slovak politician (1941–2004)

Jaroslav Svěchota, plk., JUDr. (September 13, 1941 – November 8, 2004) was the former Deputy Chief of the Slovak Secret Service and lawyer. Together with Ivan Lexa, Svěchota was one of the key figures in the controversial reign of Prime Minister Vladimír Mečiar in Slovakia in the mid-1990s and was an important figure in numerous trials concerning the Secret Service both as witness and defendant.

According to newspaper SME he was considered the "gray eminence" of the Slovak Secret Service under Ivan Lexa. All police investigation and trials of Svěchota were stopped after his death.

== Career ==
Svěchota studied law and began his career in the communist Secret Service as an agent, working for the headquarters in Bratislava. Before 1989, he also worked in the Office for protecting democracy (Slovak: Úrad na ochranu demokracie).

His career in the Slovak Secret Service skyrocketed after Ivan Lexa became the Head of the Service. In 1995 Svěchota became the Head of Counter-Intelligence and later the Deputy Chief of the Service, directly under Lexa. After the change of government and after Mikuláš Dzurinda's first government came to power, Svěchota left the Secret Service and became an attorney.

== Involvement in Slovak mafia ==
Svěchota was known to often meet with the boss of Bratislava mafia in the mid-1990s, Miroslav Sýkora. Rumors suggest that it was Svěchota who gave Sýkora the order to assassinate Róbert Remiáš. He also knew Sýkora's successor Peter Steinhübel a.k.a. Žaluď and had good understanding with Mikuláš Černák, boss of mafia in Banská Bystrica and allegedly the boss of Slovak mafia at that time.

== Investigations and trials ==
After the Head of Slovak Secret Service Vladimír Mitro delivered an address to the Slovak Parliament, investigations of numerous crimes committed by the Secret Service in the past start, most including Svěchota. He spent several months in prison in 1999. Shortly before his death he was found guilty of embezzlement of 276,000 euro and he was sentenced to 2 years in prison. Svěchota, however, appealed to the Highest Court of Slovakia which failed to decide the case before his death. All trials were stopped afterwards.

He gave testimony in the cases of Kidnapping of the Slovak President's son, Assassination of Róbert Remiáš and many more.

== Health ==
Svěchota had serious health problems for several years. He was hospitalised in Kramáre Hospital in Bratislava one month before his death and he was supposed to undergo a spine surgery. In the past, Svěchota has survived several heavy heart attacks and also clinical death.

He was observed by journalists to look very unhealthy when attending his numerous trials at courts.

== See also ==
- Crime in Slovakia
- Ivan Lexa
- Vladimír Mečiar
- Slovak mafia
- Jozef Roháč
