= Leopoldov Prison =

Slovak prison

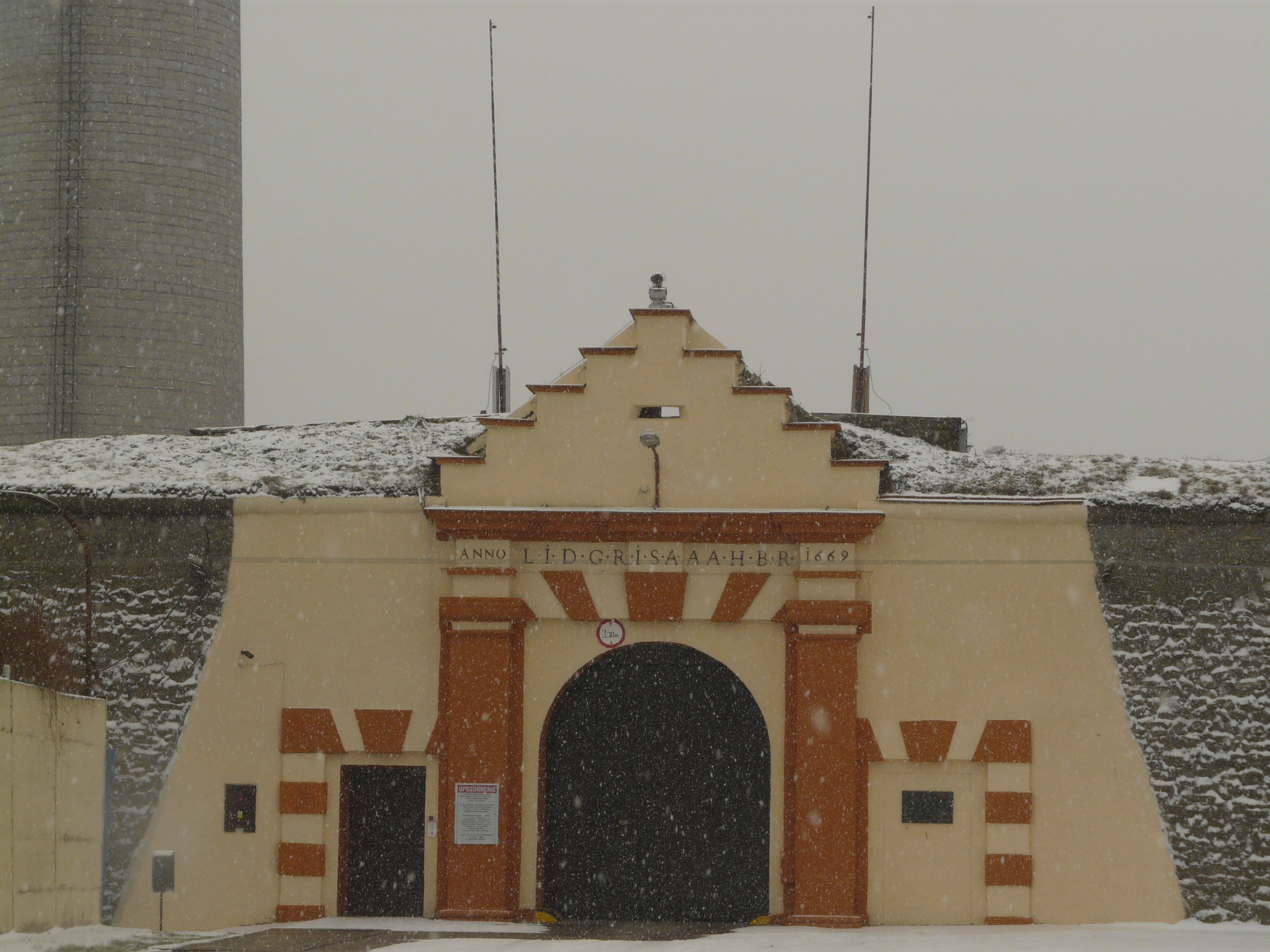
- Interactive map of Leopoldov Prison
- Location: Leopoldov, Slovakia Gucmanova Street 19/670 priečinok 7, PSČ 920 41; 48°26′39″N 17°46′40″E
- Status: Operational
- Security class: Medium-High (male)
- Capacity: 1426
- Opened: 1855
- Managed by: Zbor väzenskej a justičnej stráže
- Director: pplk. Ing. Michal Halás

The Leopoldov Prison (Slovak: Ústav na výkon trestu odňatia slobody a Ústav na výkon väzby Leopoldov) is a Slovak state-operated penitentiary facility located in the town of Leopoldov. Initially a 17th-century fortress built to defend against Ottoman Turks, it was converted into a high-security prison in the 19th century, and it used to be one of the largest prisons in the Kingdom of Hungary under the Habsburg monarchy. In the 20th century, it became known for housing political prisoners and dissidents under the Stalinist regime, particularly the future Communist President of Czechoslovakia Gustáv Husák, who was imprisoned after an intra-party purge.

After the Velvet Revolution of 1989, the Leopoldov Prison was the place of a series of violent revolts, prison escapes, and riots, requiring multiple interventions led by high-ranking government officials, including members of the Cabinet and the Prime Minister, who personally conducted negotiations and reforms inside the prison. The building complex was also severely damaged during the riots, and in 1990, the Slovak National Council officially voted to close the prison down, before the decision was ultimately reversed in 1993, allowing it to continue operating in the present day after modernization and reconstruction. Leopoldov Prison was also the place of a mass escape of inmates in 1991, where a group of seven prisoners fought their way out of the facility and became wanted fugitives, murdering five prison guards in the process.

== History ==
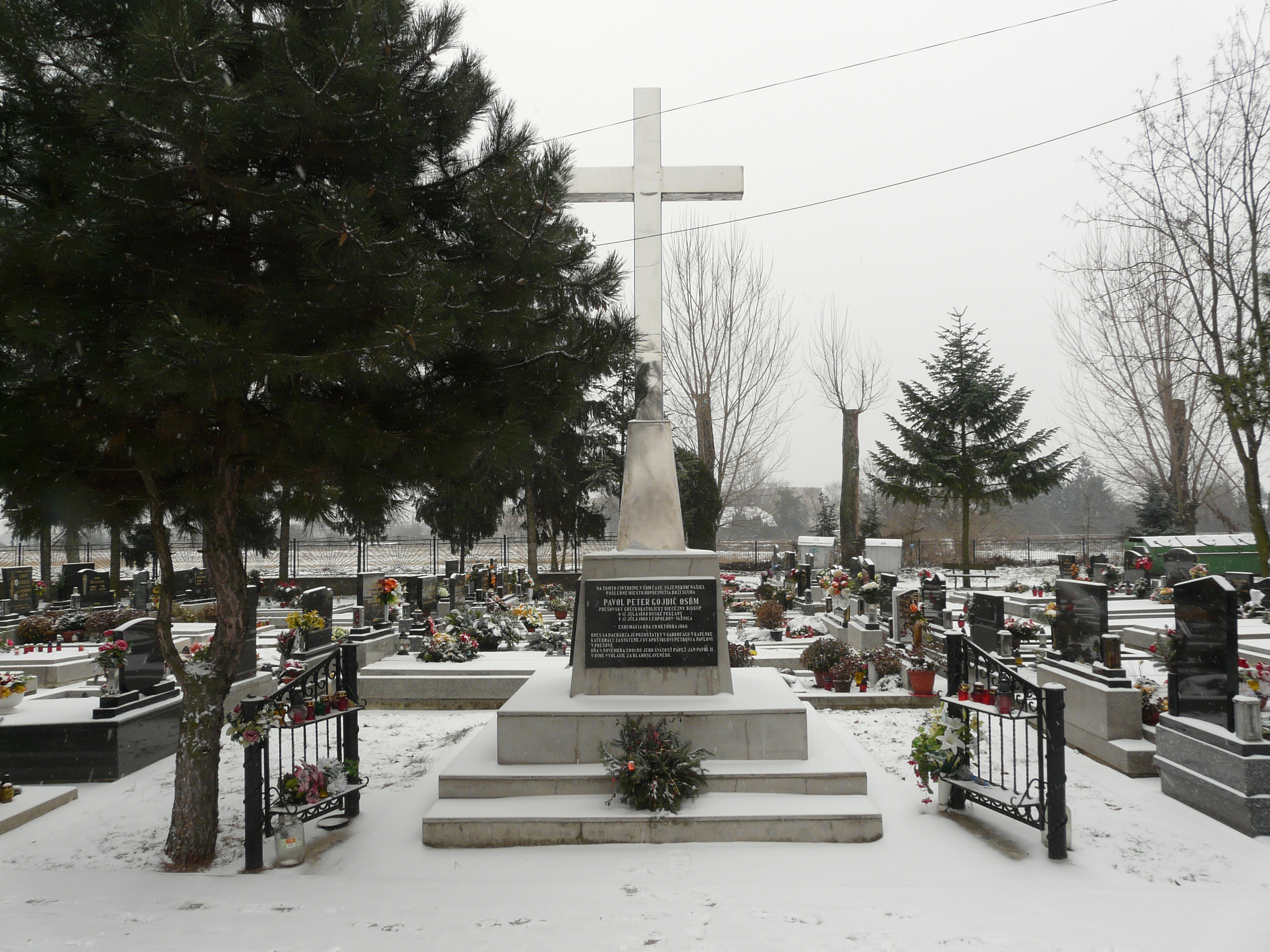
A memory on Leopoldov's cemetery dedicated to graecocatholic bishop from Prešov Pavol Peter Gojdič (died on 17 July 1960) and Metod Dominik Trčka who died in Leopoldov Prison on 23 March 1959.

The construction of Leopoldov as a fortress against Ottoman Turks started in 1665 and was finished in 1669, on the initiative of Leopold I, after the fortress town of Nové Zámky fell to the invading Ottoman armies. The fortress was built in the shape of a star, with two entrance gates, and during the reign of Maria Theresa, it was used as a military warehouse. After its loss of military importance to more specialized facilities in the 19th century, it was rebuilt as a prison in 1855, with an initial capacity of around 1000 inmates, making it the biggest prison in the Kingdom of Hungary at that time. Since that time it was continuously used as a prison until present day, and during the rule of the Communist Party of Czechoslovakia, the government frequently used the prison for imprisoning political dissidents, particularly in the 1950s under Klement Gottwald. The conditions were often harsh and torturous for prisoners since the creation of the prison, and Leopoldov quickly developed a reputation as one of the most infamous facilities in Czechoslovakia. Among the notable inmates was Gustáv Husák, imprisoned from 1954 to 1960 until his rehabilitation, who would later ascend to the position of the President of Czechoslovakia.

== Unrest ==
In December 1989, shortly after the Velvet Revolution, a wave of violent mass unrest swept Czechoslovak prisons. After a wide-ranging amnesty was signed into law by President Václav Havel in January 1990, the prisoners in Leopoldov prison revolted against the warden's administration. At that point there were approximately 2500 inmates in Leopoldov, including 370 burglars, 320 thieves, 200 murderers, and 170 rapists, with most of them falling under the provisions of Paragraph 41 and its category of high-risk and repeat offenders, and were thus not eligible for the Presidential amnesty. More than 552 prisoners were initially scheduled to be released, but the process was perceived as too slow to meaningfully satisfy the demands of the prisoners. In addition to making their cases eligible for consideration in favour of an amnesty, the revolting prisoners also demanded that all wardens and guards implicated in brutality and torture against inmates in the past should be fired and for the prison's policy to be completely overhauled. By January 1990, the unrest was initially suppressed, but tensions in the prison continued to persist, with another riot breaking out on March 1, 1990, when 217 inmates barricaded themselves inside a structure called the Castle, the sleeping quarters of the III. and IV. regiments. They managed to seize control of the area for several hours, causing extensive damage to property and furniture in the process before the uprising was pacified.

On March 15, 1990, the situation escalated even further, when hundreds of prisoners started a mass revolt, resisting arrest for two weeks, seizing control of buildings and barricading themselves inside, and using iron rods, razors, petrol bombs and improvized flamethrowers as their weapons against the guards. The revolt climaxed on March 28, 1990, when the prisoners managed to set the entire roof of the Castle on fire. By the end of the revolt, the damage was estimated at more than 27 million Czechoslovak Korunas, and a large part of the prison was rendered unfit for habitation, with the damage being so extensive that Slovak authorities initially voted to close the entire prison down for reconstruction. The situation in Leopoldov prison remained volatile even after the large revolt was finally pacified, as many leaders of the previous uprisings were still roaming among the inmates, including Tibor Polgári, who took part in a mass prison escape plan a year later. In November 1991, seven escapees from the Leopoldov prison murdered five guards and forced their way out of the facility, stealing several cars after becoming wanted fugitives, fleeing the town on a train before they were recaptured in a manhunt. Another violent incident occurred several years later on the morning of September 2, 1999, inside Cell no. 2 in the VI. block of the facility, when Jozef Vígh from Čenkovice and Stanislav Zimmermann from Malá Lehota strangled their cellmate to death with a leather belt, and then attempted to cover up the crime as a suicide. At that time, both men had already been serving sentences of 15 and 17 year long imprisonment, respectively. They were both convicted of the murder after an investigation uncovered their involvement, and their sentences were extended to life imprisonment. The prison was modernized and reconstructed in the second half of the 20th century, and before 1989, there were approximately 2,600 inmates in the prison. As of 2023, it continues to remain as the largest prison in Slovakia.

== Description ==
The Leopoldov Prison complex consists of an area with the width of 267,651 square meters. It is divided into an administrative sector, multiple prisoner cellblocks, a cafeteria, and workshops, and several parts of the complex are protected as cultural and historical landmarks. The prison also includes four general practitioner offices, one dentist's office, one psychiatrist's office and an infirmary for bedridden and ill inmates. The Leopoldov Prison also specializes in treating prisoners suffering from tuberculosis and diabetes, along with convicts undergoing court-appointed addiction treatment, usually for alcoholism and drug abuse. Although the Slovak National Council initially voted to close the prison in 1990, this decision was reversed in 1993, with the facility undergoing renovation and modernization instead. Today, the prison is used as a medium and high security prison, with a maximum capacity of 1,426 inmates, and it contains several objects and monuments that are protected as historical monuments.

== Notable inmates ==
- Rudolf Beran - Former Prime minister of Czechoslovakia.
- Bishop Pavel Peter Gojdič - A Greek Catholic Bishop and political martyr.
- Gustáv Husák - The future Communist Party President of Czechoslovakia.
- General Karel Janoušek.
- Artur London- A Communist Party politician wrongfully convicted during the Slánský Trial before being rehabilitated.
- Ondrej Rigo - A Slovak serial killer with the highest number of victims recorded in the country.
- Jozef Roháč - A hitman affiliated with the Slovak Mafia, convicted for the assassination of Róbert Remiáš.
- Bishop Metoděj Dominik Trčka - A Redemptorist Bishop, preacher, and political martyr.

== See also ==
- Prisons in Slovakia
- Life imprisonment in Slovakia
- Crime in Slovakia
- Leopoldov
