= Slovak mafia =

Prevalent criminal organizations and activities in Slovakia

- Slovenská mafia
- Founded: Early 1990s
- Named after: Individual groups are usually named after their founders
- Founding location: Slovakia
- Years active: 1990s–present (Note: The Slovak mafia in the form it existed in c. 1990–2012 is said to be gone, however, there are many, mainly "under-the-radar", drug gangs or criminal networks that participate mainly in the illegal drug trade and other related activities. These groups may or may not include smaller and/or less known, perhaps unknown and/or unnamed organizations. Some groups may also not meet the definition of a mafia-style group, and can therefore be referred to as criminal networks, or loose networks of associates engaging in criminal activity who fail to meet the defining characteristics of mafia-style groups, while still being a part of organized crime.)
- Territory: Slovakia
- Ethnicity: Primarily Slovaks
- Membership: 25-30 groups, several hundred people
- Activities: Racketeering, loan sharking, extortion, bribery, business infiltration, political corruption, illegal gambling, money laundering, fraud, theft, larceny, robbery, burglary, smuggling, drug trafficking, arms trafficking, human trafficking, kidnapping, assault, murder, bombing, arson, assassination (Note: Activities vary depending on the era. In c. 1990–2012 for example, violent crime, along with racketeering, loan sharking, extortion, bribery, business infiltration and maybe others was much more common.)
- Rivals: Albanian mafia; Ukrainian mafia; Bosnian mafia

The Slovak mafia (Slovak: Slovenská mafia) constitutes various organized crime groups in Slovakia, controlled primarily by Slovak interests. The Slovak mafia does not have significant international presence and even in Slovakia, their activities are limited by boundaries set by the powerful Russian mafia, Ukrainian mafia, Chechen mafia, and various Balkan groups controlling much of the heroin trade.

The Slovak mafia is traditionally especially active in security business, construction, and ownership of restaurants and nightclubs. According to the United States Department of State, "Both indigenous and foreign organized crime groups are well established in Slovakia". Under Slovak law, the creation, membership, activity, or support of an organized crime group constitutes a crime.

In its modern form, the mafia is a young phenomenon in Slovakia, having truly emerged only after the revolutions of 1989. According to known Slovak sociologist Pavol Haulik from the MVK poll agency, "We can state that people imagine that the mafia has a very strong influence in Slovakia". In 2005, a list of mafia members, families and "special interest groups" suspected by the Slovak police leaked to the public, complete with lists of registered weapons and vehicles followed by two leaks of updated lists in 2011.

Today, the Slovak mafia as it existed in c. 1990–2012 is said to be gone. There are, however, many, mainly "under-the-radar", drug gangs or criminal networks that participate mainly in the illegal drug trade and other related activities, such as money laundering. These groups may or may not include smaller and/or less known, perhaps unknown and/or unnamed organizations. Some groups may also not meet the definition of a mafia-style group, and can therefore be referred to as criminal networks, or loose networks of associates engaging in criminal activity who fail to meet the defining characteristics of mafia-style groups, while still being a part of organized crime. Different forms of the mafia are also speculated to exist.

== History ==
In 1989, Czechoslovakia overthrew communism, and in 1993 the Czech Republic and Slovak Republic separated. In the first half of the 1990s, the issue of organized crime was underrated and legislature concerning the fight against it was inadequate. Crime rates in Slovakia soared in the 1990s, and the first post-communist gangsters emerged. At the time of the 1994–1998 Vladimír Mečiar's government, organized crime became well established in the country and it penetrated the highest political positions. An often cited example is the Slovak Information Service, or SIS (Slovenská informačná služba) under Ivan Lexa and his deputy Jaroslav Svěchota.

== Description ==
The areas traditionally under mafia control in Slovakia include the largest cities (e.g., Bratislava, Banská Bystrica, Košice) and southern Slovakia(Dunajská Streda). According to former Chief investigator Jaroslav Ivor, organized crime is more prevalent in areas with good economic background. Southern Slovakia is also close to the Slovak-Hungarian border which provides a safety mechanism. Traditional ties to the community in a given region are also important.

According to an anonymous investigator, the political party which gets the Ministry of Interior (Ministerstvo vnútra) for the election term gets to give out orders which mafia groups are to be left alone, and which groups will be put under pressure. According to the source, it is possible to ascertain in each given time-frame which groups are avoided by the police and which groups are actively targeted by police raids and arrests. Besides the common overlap between policemen and organized crime associates, Slovak media routinely report on higher-ranking police officers having ties to organized crime.

== Mafia list leaks ==
There have been three distinct mafia lists leaked to the public so far. All of them were authored by the Slovak police.

=== First mafia list ===
The first mafia list appeared on the internet in 2005. Despite the name, it consists of several lists: the first contains names divided into several organized crime groups including dates of birth, addresses, gun license numbers and types of weapons. The second contains the names of "people of interest" including birth numbers (Slovak: rodné číslo), addresses and sometimes a photograph. The third contains "vehicles of interest" including evidence numbers and the name of the driver or owner. The fourth contains bars or restaurants either owned or frequented by the mafia. It divides the Slovak mafia into the following groups: Takáčovci, Piťovci, Borbélyovci and Jakšíkovci.

For a long time, the Slovak police did not acknowledge its veracity and it was not until January 2011 that police Chief Jaroslav Spišiak admitted that the mafia list was his idea to better fight against organized crime. "They were supposed to serve as an aid for patrolling policemen, so that they know who they are dealing with when conducting controls, to anticipate that they are dangerous", said Spišiak at that time.

Slovak broadsheet SME immediately stated that that numerous important figures of the Slovak mafia are missing from the list. Also, the paper said there are several mistakes present, such as a member of the Takáčovci group being listed under Jakšíkovci instead.

=== Second mafia list ===
The second mafia list, made in March 2010, was leaked to the Slovak media in September 2011. It contains 10 pages with the names of organized crime groups, names of members, birth numbers and addresses. It divides the Slovak mafia into the following groups: Piťovci, Jakšíkovci, Takáčovci, vlamači, (Note: burglars) autičkári, (Note: car-men) and defektári. (Note: flat-tire men)

=== Third mafia list ===
The third mafia list is the most detailed list so far, containing over 400 names and including also the photographs of all suspected mafia members. The list consists of names, addresses, birth numbers, used weapons, registered vehicles, employment information and telephone contacts. It divides the Slovak mafia into the following groups: bytová mafia, (Note: apartment mafia) Piťovci, Takáčovci, Sýkorovci, two distinct fractions of Jakšíkovci and the group around Ján Z.

The list was leaked by a policewoman working at the Office of Combating Organized Crime (Úrad boja proti organizovanej kriminalite) who downloaded it on her USB flash drive and later into the notebook of another person. She would fail a polygraph test and later confessed to the deed. On 10 October 2011, she was charged with abusing her powers.

== Notable groups ==
- Černákovci - a family founded in the early 1990s in Banská Bystrica, founded and named after Mikuláš Černák. He was considered "the boss of all bosses" after a war in the Slovak underworld in 1997.
- Takáčovci - a family founded in the early 1990s in Bratislava, founded and named after Ján Takáč. As of 2011, their roster includes the Greco-Roman wrestling trainer Karol L., former wrestler Mário R., karatist Slávo B., and ice hockey player Richard M. They are often referred to as "the group that outlived them all".
- Sýkorovci - a family founded in the early 1990s in Bratislava, founded and named after Miroslav Sýkora, although on the first mafia list, the family is named Borbélyovci. The family is the oldest mafia group in Slovakia along with Takáčovci. In February 2009, the police arrested 10 members of the group, capo Martin B. narrowly escaped. The group's Róbert Lališ a.k.a. Kýbel was the longest-running boss of all time.
- Holubovci - a family founded in the early 1990s in eastern Slovakia, founded and named after Róbert Holub. They were mainly based in Košice and the east in general.
- Pápayovci - a family founded in 1997 in Dunajská Streda, founded and named after Tibor Pápay a.k.a. Papa Joe. He took over his previous mentor, the local mafia boss Milan Sipos who was allegedly murdered with help of Cernak. The Papayovici organized group was involved in various violent and economic criminal activities, such as arson, extortion, murder, theft, carousel fraud/VAT fraud, insurance fraud, smuggling of goods and narcotics, etc.and terroised their city. In 1995, Pápay and his group began to cooperate with Miroslav Sýkor and his group, and with Mikuláš Černák and his group. Pápay also had direct contact with SIS deputy Jaroslav Svěchota.Pápay also participated in a lavish vacation with Černák in the Canary Islands and at his birthday celebration in Banská Bystrica in 1997. Tibor Pápay was murdered along with nine members of his gang on March 25, 1999, in the Fontána restaurant in the Danube River. At around 7 p.m., three gunmen disguised as police officers entered the restaurant. One of the gunmen was Arpád Szamaránsky, who shouted to the restaurant staff that it was a police operation and for everyone to lie down on the ground. Two of the masked gunmen ran upstairs, where ten Pápay members were at the time, including their boss Tibor Pápay, and opened fire on the lying members with automatic weapons. In just over a minute, they fired 113 shots at the gang members. Every shot hit its target. Nine members of the group, including Tibor Pápay, were dead on the spot, and the tenth member died after being taken to hospital. The murder of Tibor Pápay and his group is considered the most brutal murder in the modern history of Slovak and European criminalistics. Arpád Szamaránsky, the Csaba and Szilárd Raisz brothers, Ľudovít Sátor and Andrej Reisz were charged with the murder of Tibor Pápay and his group.
- Sátorovci - a family founded in the late 1990s and early 2000's in Dunajská Streda, founded and named after Ľudovít Sátor a.k.a. Lajos. They were the enemies of the Pápay gang who eliminated in 1999.The family is often considered the most brutal mafia group in Slovakia of all time. Arpád Szamaránsky died in a car accident in 2005 after being released from custody. Csaba and Szilárd Raisz disappeared without a trace in 2008. They were murdered and their bodies were found in an illegal grave in 2011.Andrej Reisz was murdered in November 2006. Ľudovít Sátor was allegedly murdered in 2010. The bodies of both were never found and both are still being sought by the police. To this day, no one has been legally convicted for the murder of Pápay and his group.
- Jakšíkovci - a family founded and named after brothers Ivan and Libor Jakšík, who worked with the police in the 1990s and later owned a chain of bars. Ivan Jakšík had a company (LIKO) with Ivan Pokorný and lawyer Martin Bognár. Bognár was previously accused of creating contracts about protection with security companies attached to the Takáčovci family, an important part of the restaurant and bar racket. Both he and members of the Takáčovci group were released when the prosecutor unexpectedly dismissed the charges. They had legal troubles in May 2011 when the Slovak police arrested 8 members on various charges.
- Piťovci - a family founded in the early 2000s in Lamač, Bratislava, founded and named after Juraj Ondrejčák a.k.a. Piťo. They made extensive use of Mercedes G vehicles.
- Mafiánske dvojičky (Note: Mafia twins) - a family founded in the early 2010s in the Považská Bystrica District by twin brothers Dávid and Dominik Krátki, both also known as rovnaký. (Note: the same) They led a military-like organized drug crime group that was said to have some of the most pure cocaine Slovakia had ever seen, which they sold mainly to higher ups and also to distributors in Prague. They also sold marijuana, heroin, and methamphetamine. They came to control the Trenčín, Žilina, and partly the Trnava Region. Eventually they wanted to spread out and also control the Nitra and Bratislava Region, though unsuccessfully. In 2017, they were arrested after a 2016 murder of their friend, who was also a member of their group, after he became an informant, and in the early 2020s, they were sentenced to life in prison, to be served in a maximum-security facility.

Other groups may or may not include smaller and/or less known, perhaps unknown and/or unnamed organizations. Some groups may not meet the definition of a mafia-style group, and can therefore be referred to as criminal networks, or loose networks of associates engaging in criminal activity who fail to meet the defining characteristics of mafia-style groups.

== Today ==
After the deaths and arrests of many mob bosses in Slovakia, today it is said the Slovak mafia as it existed in the 1990s is gone. Most members of these mafia groups either were killed, are in prison, or ran away. It is said to mostly end in the early 2010s. However, the murder of Ján Kuciak, an investigative journalist, raised questions amongst the general public if the mafia is still alive, since murders of investigative journalists are uncommon in Slovakia.

Although the mafia as it existed in the 1990s is said to be gone, there are speculations that it still might exist in different forms. Many people claim that there are trucks going through villages that carry immigrants, as well as that there are groups that give jobs to illegal immigrants.

Amongst these speculations, there are different speculations and theories. The black market, however, mainly the illegal drug trade, is widespread in Slovakia. There are many, mainly "under-the-radar", drug gangs or criminal networks that participate in the illegal drug trade, money laundering, etc. Intermittently, some of these groups are caught by authorities and sometimes publicised.

== Popular culture ==
- There have been many different types of media made relating to the mafia, including books, documentaries, movies and such, including a 2015 book by the most-known Slovak mafioso, Mikuláš Černák, "Prečo som prelomil mlčanie" (Why I broke the silence).
- The Slovak hip-hop group Kontrafakt was somewhat affiliated with the Piťovci group, as they appeared in the music video for their 2004 song, "Moji ľudia" (My people).
- The documentary TV series Mafiáni na Slovensku focuses on and explores real-life Slovak mafia and their activities, especially during the 1990s.
- The movie Vojna policajtov released in 2024 is a Slovak film inspired and set in 1990s eastern Slovakia, where a solitary police operative skillfully moves on the edge of the law.
- The movie MIKI released in 2024 is a Slovak film based on the life of Mikuláš Černák, also known as "the boss of all bosses", the founder and leader of the Černákovci group.
- The movie ČERNÁK released in 2025 is a continuation of the movie MIKI.
- The game Vivat Slovakia released in 2025 is an open-world action game inspired and set in 1990s Slovakia's Bratislava, where corruption and law enforcement is weak, inspired by true events.

== See also ==
- Crime in Slovakia
- Law enforcement in Slovakia
- Human trafficking in Slovakia
- Corruption in Slovakia
- List of political scandals in Slovakia
