= Privatization in Slovakia =

Privatization in Slovakia occurred primarily in the 1990s as a result of the Velvet Revolution in 1989 and after the creation of Slovak Republic in 1993 due to the splitting of Czechoslovakia. While the Czech Republic, under the leadership of President Václav Havel and Prime Minister Václav Klaus, has emerged as a favorite for Western investors and entrepreneurs, Slovakia under autocratic Prime Minister Vladimír Mečiar struggled with the transition.

== Background ==
Privatization in Slovakia started even before the creation of the Slovak Republic on 1 January 1993. The so-called "first wave of voucher privatization" started in Czechoslovakia in November 1991; Czechoslovak citizens could order shares of state-owned companies using the technique as part of the transition to the private sector.

== History ==
On 6 January 1993, Prime Minister Vladimír Mečiar announced that Slovakia would not continue its voucher privatization, but would continue the privatization process in different ways.

The Minister for Privatization in the First Mečiar government was Ľubomír Dolgoš (HZDS), who was perceived as an independent economist. Despite his hasting of the privatization process, privatization effectively stalled in Slovakia. According to Dolgoš, various Ministry offices did not work on preparing privatization but instead they were only concerned with how to find ways to give certain state-owned companies to certain people. In June 1993, after conflicts with Mečiar, Ľubomír Dolgoš resigned as a Minister and left the political party HZDS. After the President of Slovakia Michal Kováč refused to name Ivan Lexa the next Minister of Privatization, Mečiar officially took over the responsibilities of the Minister and named Lexa the Deputy Minister (Slovak: štátny tajomník).

On 5 August 1996 the FNM Presidium President Štefan Gavorník said that the agency is preparing to privatize firms, including banks, under pressure from the ministers of agriculture, economy, and construction and public works, in spite of Prime Minister Vladimír Mečiar's written pledge to the Party of the Democratic Left (SDĽ), in which he guaranteed a halt to privatization.

== See also ==
- Economy of Slovakia
- History of Slovakia
- Slovak political scandals
- Crime in Slovakia
