= Law enforcement in Slovakia =

Logo of the Police Corps of the Republic of Slovakia

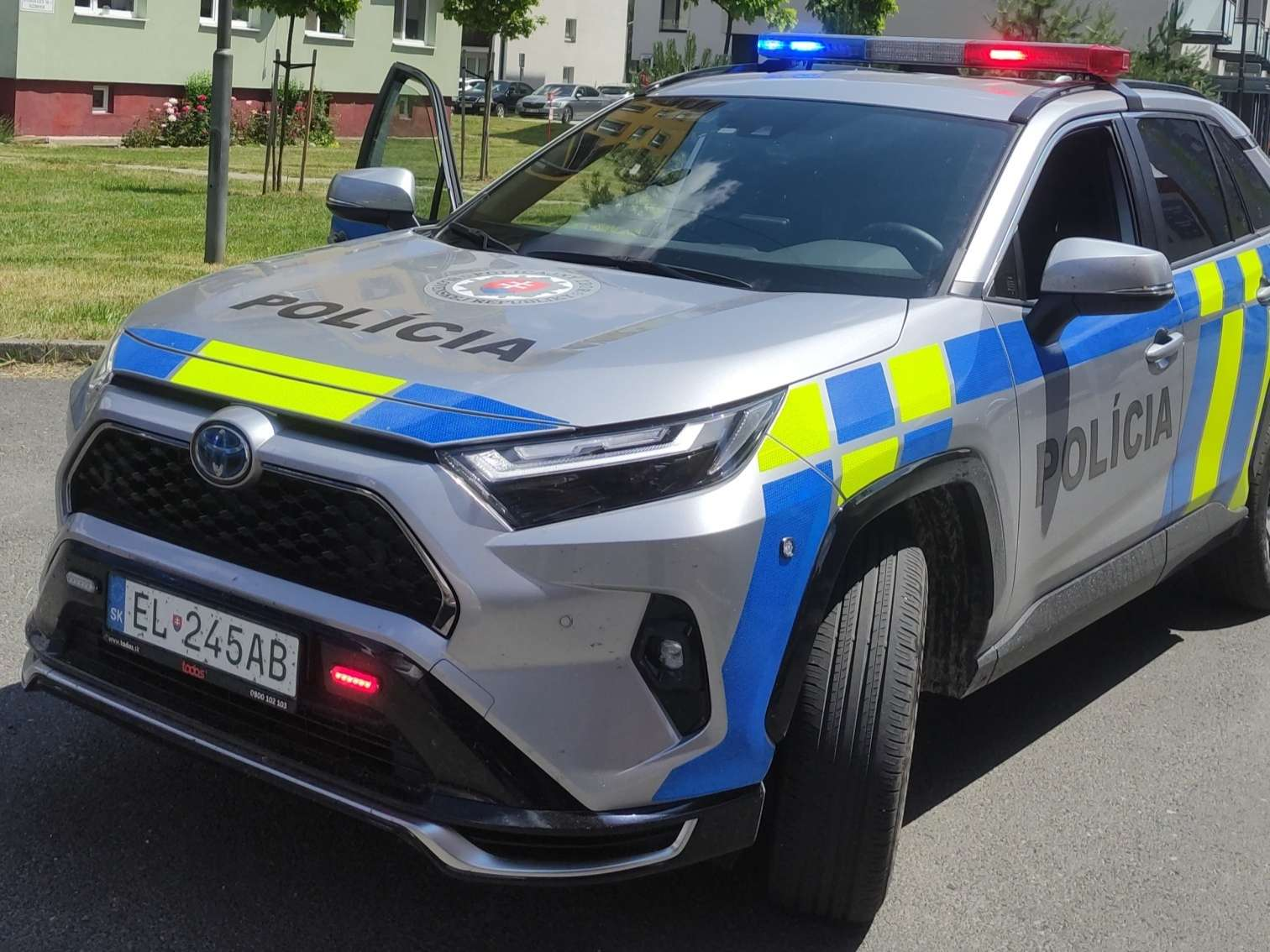
A Slovak Police Force car in Slovakia

Law enforcement in Slovakia is divided among various agencies under the Slovak ministries of Interior, Justice, Traffic, Defense, Finance and local governments within the Republic. The Slovak Secret Service (Slovenská informačná služba), one out of four secret services in the country, also lists among its tasks those usually reserved for the police force, for example fighting against organized crime and computer crime, Slovakia also features voluntary police without any extra rights.

Civil policing responsibilities are shared between the state and local level: in addition to the Slovak police Force (Policajný zbor Slovenskej republiky), various municipal police forces exist. Other forces include the military police, railway police, finance police, various special forces units divided between numerous ministries and others. As of 2012, there were 21,407 state policemen serving in Slovakia, with 2,500 municipal policemen and 750 voluntary citizens, which is three times the number of policemen in the comparatively similar Finland.

== Structure ==
- Secret services
  - Slovenská informačná služba
  - Vojenská spravodajská služba
  - Vojenské obranné spravodajstvo
  - Národný bezpečnostný úrad
- Police Corps
  - Traffic Police
  - Railway Police
    - Riot Railway Police
  - Financial Police
  - Riot Police
    - Police Emergency Units of Riot Police departments of the Regional Police Headquarters of the Police Force (Slovak: Pohotovostné policajné útvary OPP KR PZ)
  - Special protection department of the Office for protection of state officials and diplomatic missions (Slovak: Odbor špeciálnej ochrany Úradu pre ochranu ústavných činiteľov a diplomatických misií MV SR)
  - Criminal Police
  - Border and Foreigner Police
  - Toll Police
- Slovak Armed Forces
  - Military Police
    - Riot Military Police
  - 5th Regiment of special assignment of Jozef Gabčík in Žilina (Slovak: 5. pluk špeciálneho určenia Jozefa Gabčíka Žilina)
  - Special Operations Unit - Lynx Commando (Slovak: Útvar osobitného určenia - Lynx Commando)
- Prison and Court Police
  - Engagement Unit of the Prison and Court Police Corps (Slovak: Zásahová jednotka Špeciálnej zásahovej skupiny ZVJS)
- Customs Police
  - Service Engagement Unit of the Customs Criminal Office of the Slovak Customs Administration (Slovak: Jednotka služobných zákrokov Colného kriminálneho úradu CS SR)
- Municipal Police
  - various Municipal Police forces in different cities
- Slovakia Drug Agency

== Railway police ==
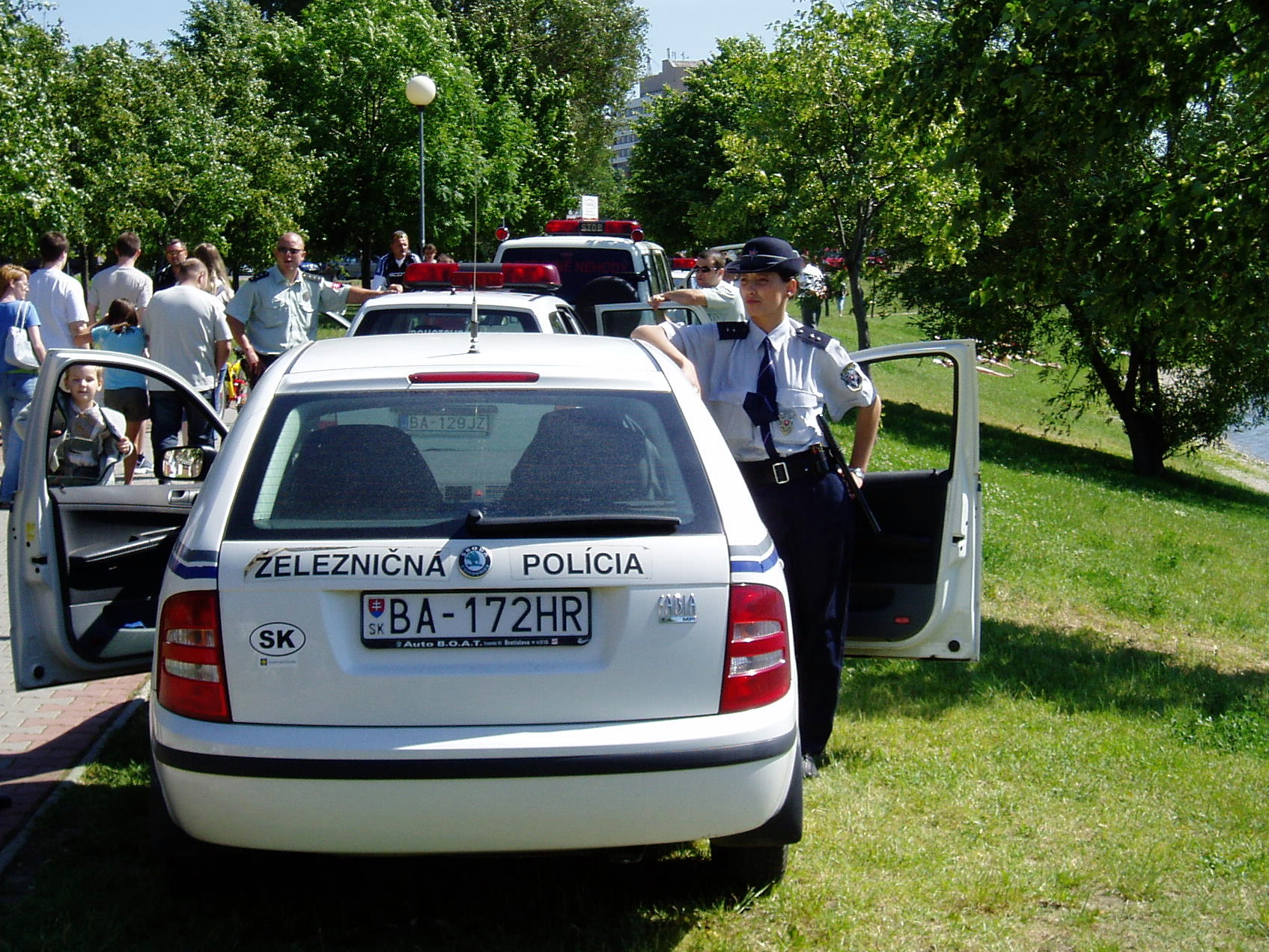
Slovak Railway policewoman standing next to her vehicle in 2005

In 1918 the new Czechoslovak railways established its own security infrastructure, which at that time served only as a backup force for the regular police. Armed men protecting the railways were established in 1935, their functioning was regulated by the Law No. 86/1937 Zb from the year 1937, which also established the Armed guards units of the railways (Slovak: Ozbrojených strážnych oddielov železníc). Later, in the 1950s, Public Security at the Railways (Slovak: Verejná bezpečnosť na železnici) was created. Law No. 51/1964 Zb. established the Units of Armed and Fire protection of the Railways (Slovak: Ozbrojená a požiarna ochrana železníc - OPOŽ) in 1964. In 1967, under the OPOŽ units, an independent investigation service was established by Law No. 46/1967 Zb. After the fall of communism in 1989, federal power ceased over the protection of the railway system in 1992. Law No. 61/1993 Z. z from the year 1993 created a separate Slovak Railway Police by transforming part of the Federal Railway Police.

In 1998 the National Council of the Slovak Republic approved Law No. 57/1998 Z.z. by which the Railway Police was governed and the service employment within the Railway Police was described in Law No. 73/1998 Z.z. On 14 February 2008 the former law was amended with Law No. 86/2008 Z. z., this change established the structures of the Toll Police within the Railway Police. In 2010, the National Council of the Slovak Republic amended the Railway Police Law again by approving Law No. 60/2010 Z. z., moving the structures of the Toll Police within the Slovak Police Force.

Previously administered by the Ministry of Transport, Post and Telecommunications, since 2009 the Railway Police is administered by the Ministry of Interior. Since 1 January 2011, in accordance with law approved on 10 December 2010, a new service "Railway Police" was created within the Police Force and the Railway Police was moved under the Police Force, all eligible former members becoming members of the Police Force. Some of the unique Railway Police competences were absorbed by the Police Force as well.

The following competences were added to each member of the Police Force since 1 January 2011:

- control over the railway traffic
- investigating railway traffic threats
- cooperating with others in the safe transfer of nuclear and other special materials

Current uniforms and badges are valid until the end of 2015.

== Special forces ==
Slovakia features numerous special forces units, universally referred to as kukláči (the word kukla means 'balaclava' in Slovak) by the Slovak media and the public. In communist Czechoslovakia the URN units were responsible for counter-terrorism and apprehending dangerous criminals. URN members were picked from across the country. After the creation of independent Slovakia in 1993, Slovak members of URN were relocated into newly created special forces in Slovakia.

- Ministry of Interior
  - Special Operations Unit of the Presidium of the Police Force - Lynx Commando (Slovak: Útvar osobitného určenia Prezídia Policajného zboru)
  - Police Emergency Units of Riot Police departments of the Regional Police Headquarters of the Police Force (Slovak: Pohotovostné policajné útvary OPP KR PZ)
  - Special protection department of the Office for protection of state officials and diplomatic missions (Slovak: Odbor špeciálnej ochrany Úradu pre ochranu ústavných činiteľov a diplomatických misií MV SR)
  - Engagement group of the Office for combating organized crime of the Presidium of the Police Force (Slovak: Zásahová skupina Úradu boja proti organizovanej kriminalite Prezídia Policajného zboru)
  - Engagement and Training Unit of the Mobile engagement unit of the Police Force in Sobrance (Slovak: Zásahová a výcviková jednotka ÚHCP mobilnej zásahovej jednotky Policajného zboru Riaditeľstva hraničnej polície Sobrance)
- Ministry of Finance
  - Service Mission Unit of the Customs Criminal Office of the Slovak Customs Administration (Slovak: Jednotka služobných zákrokov Colného kriminálneho úradu CS SR)
- Ministry of Justice
  - Engagement Unit of the Prison and Court Police Corps (Slovak: Zásahová jednotka Špeciálnej zásahovej skupiny ZVJS)
- Ministry of Defense
  - 5th Special Forces Regiment of Jozef Gabčík in Žilina (Slovak: 5. Pluk špeciálneho určenia Jozefa Gabčíka Žilina)

== See also ==
- Crime in Slovakia
- Life imprisonment in Slovakia
