= Lexa (name) =

Lexa (Czech and Slovak feminine: Lexová) is a surname. It is a shortened form of the given names Alexander, Alexandra, and the like. Notable people with the name include:

== Surname ==
- Anthony Lexa (born 2000), English actress and musician
- František Lexa (1876–1960), Czech Egyptologist
- Ivan Lexa (born 1961), Slovak politician
- Petr Lexa (born 1991), Czech singer
- Stefan Lexa (born 1976), Austrian footballer
- Vladimír Lexa (born 1937), Slovak politician

== Given name ==
- Lexa (singer) (born 1995), Brazilian singer, songwriter and dancer
- Lexa Doig (born 1973), Canadian actress
- Lexa Roséan (born 1958), American writer and dancer

== Fictional ==
- Lexa (The 100), a character in the TV series The 100
- Lexa Pierce, character in the TV series Mutant X

== See also ==
- Alois Lexa von Aehrenthal (1854–1912), Czech nobleman and Austro-Hungarian diplomat
