= Ján Cuper =

Slovak politician (1946–2025)

Member of the National Council
- In office 23 June 1992 – 4 July 2006

Personal details
- Born: 25 November 1946 Dubová, Czechoslovakia
- Died: 5 February 2025 (aged 78) Bratislava, Slovakia
- Party: Communist Party of Czechoslovakia (1986–1989); Movement for a Democratic Slovakia (1992–2012)
- Spouse: Svetlana Ilavská
- Education: Comenius University

Ján Cuper (25 November 1946 – 5 February 2025) was a Slovak politician and lawyer. He served as an MP of the last Czechoslovak Federal Assembly (1992–1993) and later of the National Council of Slovakia (1993–2006).

== Early life and education ==
Ján Cuper was born on 25 November 1946 in the village of Dubová in the Svidník District. Cuper studied law at the Comenius University, graduating in 1975. He defended his candidature in 1983 at the same university. In 1986, he joined the Communist Party of Czechoslovakia, in spite of being previously persecuted for the landowner background of his family.

=== Political career ===
After the Velvet Revolution, Cuper became active as an organizer of rallies for the independence of Slovakia. In 1992, he was among the deputies elected on the list of Movement for a Democratic Slovakia to the Chamber of Nations of the Federal Assembly. He voted for the independence of Slovakia. After independence, he retained his mandate in every election until 2002. While failing to defend his mandate in 2002 Slovak parliamentary election, he remained in the parliament as a replacement for Sergej Kozlík, who was elected MEP. In 2005, he caused a traffic accident while heavily intoxicated, but received no punishment as he was protected by legal immunity as an MP. Cuper left the Movement for a Democratic Slovakia in 2006 after the party leadership refused to include him on its list for the 2006 Slovak parliamentary election, due to the drunk driving incident. Subsequently, Cuper attempted several unsuccessful political comebacks with the Slovak National Party as well as the far-right People's Party Our Slovakia. In 2017 he started working as an aide for Juraj Kolesár, an MP for the People's Party Our Slovakia.

=== Legal career ===
In addition to politics, Cuper was active as a lawyer, notably serving as an attorney for Ivan Lexa, a former head of Slovak Information Service accused of variety of criminal activities against the political opposition. Until 2017, he taught law at the Comenius University as well as at other universities.

== Personal life and death ==
Cuper was married to Svetlana Ilavská. In 2007, he climbed Mount Kilimanjaro at the age of 61.

Cuper collapsed and died while delivering a speech in a pub at the Miletičová open-air market in Bratislava, on 5 February 2025, at the age of 78.
