= Special Task Force of National Anti-Drug Department – Slovakia =

Special Task Force of the National Anti-drug Department of Slovakia (hereinafter NADSTF) was created in 1996 as a response to the peculiarity of anti-drug actions and specific situations where trespassers act with greater conspiracy and violence than average criminals.

== History ==
- In 1996 the NADSTF was founded.
- In 2004 the NADSTF received greater powers for arresting highly dangerous criminals and especially members of organized crime groups.
- In 2005 the NADSTF got the status of an official special force.

The NADSTF duties include the following of organized crime groups, working in coverage, protecting important witnesses, preparing for actions sooner than the crimes are committed and arresting highly dangerous criminals. In 2006 the NADSTF organized around 100 actions and arrested 62 armed criminals. This special unit is an intersection between investigation and SWAT in the field of counteraction to the organized crime. The NADSTF is called for action where special skills are needed in addition to the usual SWAT team work.

== Responsibility ==
Members of the NADSTF are responsible for operative and intelligence service. The NADSTF members usually have previous background experience in special raid units (PPU) or police fast response units, or other similar special response units.

The responsibility of the NADSTF also includes the organization of actions for the protection of evidence, as well as preparation of all the information necessary for the organization of actions and following criminal procedures. This makes the NADSTF a unique unit in Slovak Special Forces.

== Training ==
The NADSTF members are trained to use special operative and intelligence techniques. The members are often sent under coverage to the criminal territory. After working on a target, raising information and evidence the members prepare an attack or arrests directly on the crime scene. The purpose of the actions is to save the evidence, not just arresting criminals, who could later be released because of the lack of evidence.

Members of the NADSTF undergo significant tactics trainings with an accent on arresting armed criminals in difficult situations (in a car, in a street, in public places, with hostages, or explosives). Such trainings prepare the NADSTF members for all kinds of psychic ballast, which can confront them on duty. Only real ammunition is used for the practice, which takes place in real environment in buildings and cars. Thus, the members of the NADSTF are well-prepared to collect intelligence information, protect themselves and arrest highly dangerous criminals.

== Equipment ==
- Heckler & Koch MP5

== See also ==
- Law enforcement in Slovakia
- Crime in Slovakia
