= Lexa =

Lexa may refer to:

- Lexa, Arkansas, a city in Phillips County, United States
- Repressor lexA

== People ==
- Lexa (name)
- Lexa (singer) (born 1995), Brazilian singer
- Leo Kinnunen (1943–2017), Finnish former racing driver nicknamed Leksa
- Count Alois Lexa von Aehrenthal (1854–1912), Bohemian-Austrian diplomat

== Fictional entities ==
- Lexa (The 100), a fictional character in the TV series The 100

== See also ==
- Alexandra (disambiguation)
- Leksa (Norwegian toponym)
- Lex (disambiguation)
- Lexus
