= Human trafficking in Slovakia =

The Slovak Republic ratified the 2000 UN TIP Protocol in September 2004.

In 2008, Slovakia was a source, transit, and limited destination country for women and girls from Moldova, Ukraine, Bulgaria, the Balkans, the Baltics, and China trafficked to Germany, Austria, the Czech Republic, Switzerland, Sweden, Italy, the Netherlands, Spain, Portugal, Croatia, and Slovenia for the purpose of commercial sexual exploitation. Men from Vietnam were trafficked to Slovakia for the purpose of forced labor. Roma women and girls from Slovakia are trafficked internally for sexual exploitation. The Government of the Slovak Republic does not fully comply with the minimum standards for the elimination of trafficking; however, it is making significant efforts to do so. The government allocated $91,000 for anti-trafficking efforts in 2007, an increase from $60,000 in 2006. In February 2008, police began investigating the country’s first identified labor trafficking case involving eight Vietnamese nationals forced to work in a cigarette factory in Bratislava. The government also made efforts to improve victim identification and assistance referral. However, the number of victims assisted by government-funded programs decreased in 2007.

The U.S. State Department's Office to Monitor and Combat Trafficking in Persons placed the country in "Tier 1" in 2018, but it was listed as a "Tier 2" in 2019, 2020 and 2023.

The 2020 GRETA report noted that the government was making positive changes in tackling this crime, but that more needed to be done, particularly when investigating allegations.

In 2023, the Organized Crime Index gave the country a score of 5 out of 10 for human trafficking.

== Prosecution (2008) ==
The Government of the Slovak Republic demonstrated adequate law enforcement efforts during the reporting period. The Slovak Republic prohibits all forms of trafficking through Sections 179-181 of its criminal code, which prescribes penalties under the criminal code ranging from four to 25 years’ imprisonment. These penalties are sufficiently stringent and are commensurate with those prescribed for other grave crimes, such as rape. Police conducted 14 trafficking investigations in 2007, including one labor trafficking investigation, compared to 20 investigations in 2006. The government prosecuted 16 defendants in four cases, compared to 32 trafficking cases in 2006. Seven trafficking offenders were convicted during the year, down from 18 convicted in 2006. Most convicted traffickers were given sentences of up to two years’ imprisonment; one trafficker was sentenced to seven months’ imprisonment. There were no official cases of high-level government officials involved in trafficking; however the government extradited one person to Austria to face trafficking charges during 2008.

== Protection (2008) ==
The government demonstrated modest efforts to assist and protect victims in 2007. The Ministry of the Interior (Ministerstvo vnútra) funded a new NGO program which provided shelter and assistance to four victims. In 2006, government funding to NGOs aided 10 victims; an additional 43 victims were assisted by nongovernmental-funded programs. The Ministry of Interior published a training manual and provided victim identification, referral, and sensitivity training for 490 police officers. Police identified and referred 15 victims to NGOs for assistance during 2008. Victims are encouraged to participate in investigations and prosecutions; foreign victims who cooperate with law enforcement are permitted to remain in Slovakia and work for the duration of the investigation or trial.

== Prevention (2008) ==
Slovakia demonstrated limited efforts to prevent trafficking during 2008. The Border and Alien Police (Hraničná a cudzinecká polícia) monitored the border for evidence of trafficking. The government continued to operate a 38-bed shelter for unaccompanied minors who enter the country illegally, thus helping to prevent the trafficking of this vulnerable population. In 2007, the government allocated $22,000 to develop and implement future awareness campaigns to reduce the demand for commercial sex acts. The Ministry of Education (Ministerstvo školstva) approved the use of NGO-produced anti-trafficking materials in schools in 2007, and the Ministry of Labor and Social Affairs (Ministerstvo práce a sociálnych vecí) cooperated with NGOs in a series of training and trafficking awareness activities aimed at vulnerable population groups, including Roma populations. During the reporting period, the government published a brochure educating its nationals traveling to other EU countries for employment opportunities about the dangers of trafficking. Slovakia did not provide trafficking awareness training for deployed peacekeeping officials.

== See also ==
- Human rights in Slovakia
- Human trafficking in Europe
- Crime in Slovakia
- Law enforcement in Slovakia
- Slovak mafia
