= Assassination of Róbert Remiáš =

1996 murder in Bratislava, Slovakia

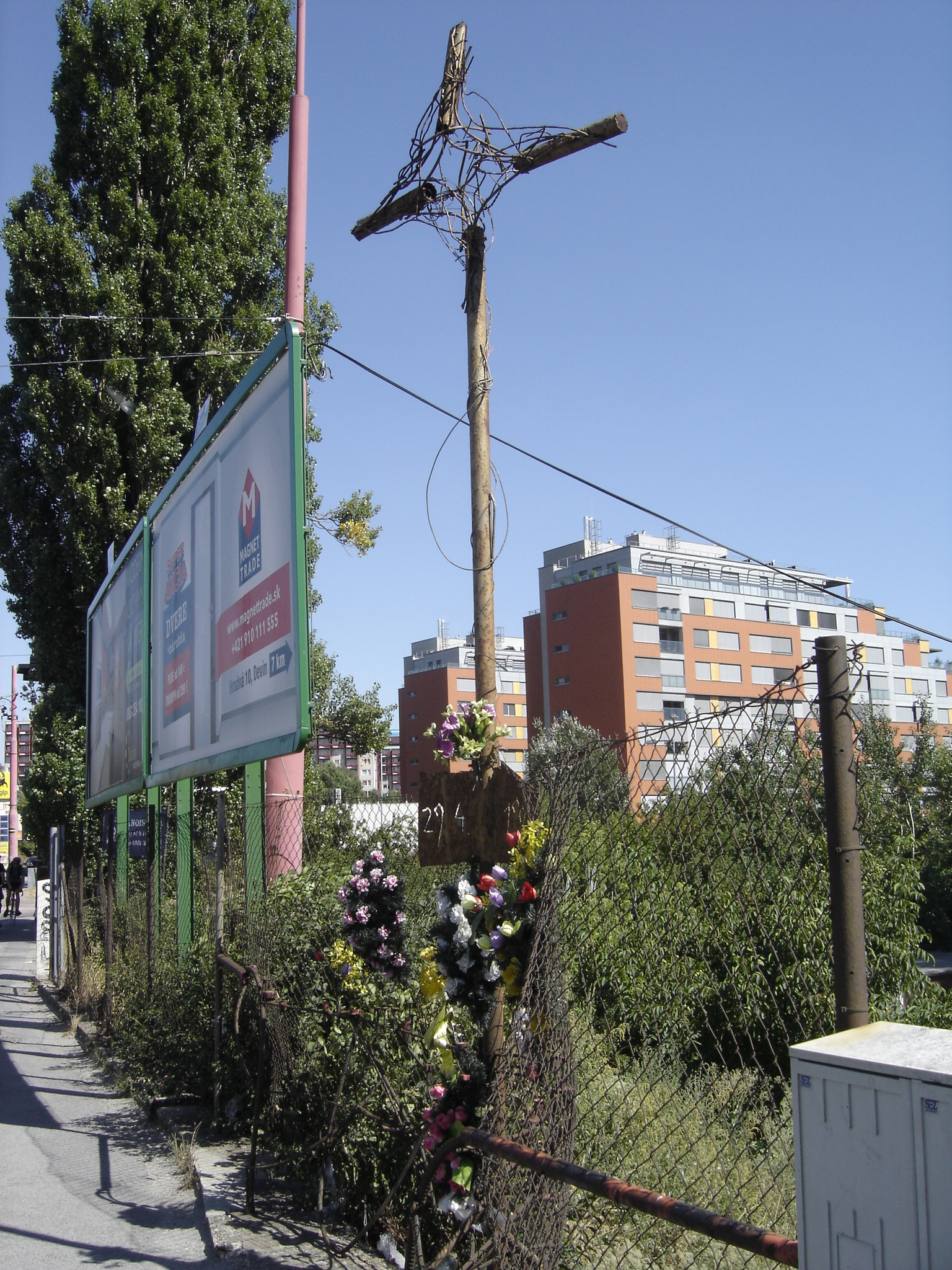
Robert Remias memorial

The assassination of Róbert Remiáš took place on April 29, 1996, in Karlova Ves, Bratislava, Slovakia. Remiáš, an ex-police officer, was one of the key figures in the trial against Slovak Information Service in the case of the kidnapping of the Slovak President's son into Austria from 1995. Remiáš's car was remotely detonated in the middle of a busy crossroad at Karloveská Street. There were numerous high-ranking mafia organised crime figures present at the crime scene watching the explosion, as well as Slovak Information Service operatives. The crime has never been solved. The anniversary of the assassination was often used by political parties critical of Vladimír Mečiar to call out for the annulment of his amnesties which prevented some key political crimes from the mid-1990s to be investigated.

== Background ==
Róbert Remiáš (born Róbert Michalík; May 22, 1970 - April 29, 1996) was an ex-police officer and a person through whom Oskar Fegyveres communicated in a key political lawsuit of the 1990s - Kidnapping of the Slovak President's son into Austria. Fegyveres was an ex-intelligence officer who gave testimony in the case of kidnapping of the son of the President of Slovakia, Michal Kováč, Jr. Fegyveres described the involvement of Prime Minister Vladimír Mečiar and Director of Slovak Information Service Ivan Lexa in this crime. As of 1996, Fegyveres was already in hiding and communicated only through his close friend Róbert Remiáš.

Slovak Information Service started spying on Remiáš shortly after Fegyveres went into hiding in 1995. The surveillance lasted until his death. Agents were watching Remiáš from a flat neighboring his at the Dlhé Diely suburb. The first person to publicly say that Remiáš was spied upon was his mother Anna Remiášová, approximately a month after the assassination. She said that her son's phone was tapped and argued that after his death the Slovak police demanded from her videotapes where Remiáš recorded those that were stalking him. She revealed that there were never any videotapes and that her son only spoke about them over the phone to confuse the people who were watching him. Later, the head of Slovak Information Service Vladimír Mitro admitted that the phone in Remiáš's home on Majerníková Street No. 5 was wiretapped from November 14, 1995, until his death. He was also under constant surveillance in "Akcia Brojler" (Operation Broiler).

On March 14, 1996, Remiáš visited the third investigator of the Kidnapping of the Slovak President's son case, Jozef Číž. He complained to Číž about being constantly watched and provided the following car models and number plates: Ford Sierra NRI 96-27, Mitsubishi Pajero NRI 54-39 and Škoda Felicia BLH 99-98. He described the crews of these cars as muscular young men with short-cut hair. According to Remiáš, Číž laughed at him and demanded to know where Oskar Fegyveres was. As it later turned out, the vehicles belonged to mafia group called Ferusovci.

Several rumors published in a book written by former journalist Peter Tóth suggest that the Deputy Director of Slovak Information Service Jaroslav Svěchota might have given the order to spy on and, potentially also to assassinate Remiáš to the boss of Bratislava mafia at that time, Miroslav Sýkora. Svěchota knew Sýkora personally, both men met regularly. According to the original lawsuit, Sýkora delegated the hit to Jozef Roháč and Imrich Oláh. According to the head of investigators at that time, they were helped by two other unidentified men, one of them a member of the Slovak Information Service. Roháč placed an explosive device under Remiáš's car, attaching it to the rear axle. Remiáš was also linked to have ties with Albanian drug mafia, and according to some testimonies was engaged in selling heroin. The book claims, although unlikely, that his death might be related to these activities.

== Assassination ==
The car exploded on Karloveská Street in Karlova Ves, Bratislava on April 29, 1996, in front of a pub called "Riviéra" at 9:15 p.m. The explosion did not kill Remiáš immediately, as evidenced by fumes found in his lungs and witness accounts of hearing him scream, but he did die shortly after, probably burning to death.

During the time of the explosion there were numerous people observing the crossroads:

- Roman Deák, an organised crime member from Bratislava, was sitting in his purple Mercedes SUV at the opposite side of the road where Remiáš's car detonated. He was the one who actually called the police and reported a car explosion at Karloveská Street. Deák was later gunned down by Jurij Fejer and Jozef Roháč on October 20, 1999, in the Dúbravka borough of Bratislava.
- Next to Deák's car there was supposed to be a Mercedes with two Slovak Information Service operatives. According to eyewitnesses, one of them came out of the car to take a closer look at the burning car.
- On the opposite side of the street, in front of restaurant Riviéra and near the explosion there was a Mercedes with Tibor Pápay a.k.a. Papa Joe, the head of an organised crime family in Dunajská Streda. Pápay was later gunned down in the most spectacular mafia mass-murder in the modern history of Slovakia on March 25, 1999, in restaurant Fontána together with most of his gang.
- Imrich Oláh and Jozef Roháč were also supposed to be watching the crime scene.

== Investigation ==
As of 2003, the investigation file had 2400 pages. The first 600 were written by investigator Ján Móric, the rest by his successor Július Šáray. According to magazine Plus 7 dní there are hints of the Slovak Information Service involvement in the crime already in Móric's work. Móric told the mother of Róbert Remiáš that if he were to be pressured in any way, he would immediately quit the Police force. A few months into the investigation, Móric quit his job at the police.

Bratislava regional prosecution, complying with the investigator, dropped the charges against Jozef Roháč and Imrich Oláh in 2006 in relation to the murder of Róbert Remiáš. The Prosecutor's Office claims that the charges were dropped because of the testimonies of witnesses: Karol Szatmáry, Margita S., Otakar N., Milan R., Jozef H., Peter T., Štefan C., Štefan V., Ladislav T. and a concealed witness.

=== Testimony of Karol Szatmáry ===
Organised crime member Karol Szatmáry decided to cooperate with the Slovak police, although he would later flee and go into hiding. In 1999, Minister of Interior Ladislav Pittner declared that "with a degree of certainty he explained to us the connection between the Slovak Secret Service and the mafia". Pittner famously characterized Szatmáry with the sentence: "The witness committed crimes of the most serious nature". According to Szatmáry, the killing was ordered by Miroslav Sýkora (who in turn had an order from Ivan Lexa) who delegated the hit to Imrich Oláh. Jozef Roháč was supposed to provide the explosive device. Szatmáry testified that Oláh admitted the murder to him in the summer of 1998. Szatmáry later recalled his testimony by writing a letter to the Slovak police, claiming it was provided under pressure and after being promised various advantages in his own investigation.

After the analysis of Imrich Oláh's body, which was found on October 12, 2005 established his time of death as July 1997. Therefore, Szatmáry's claim that he met him in 1998 is certainly false. Szatmáry went into hiding in 2000 becoming one of the most sought-after fugitives in Slovakia.

Karol Szatmáry committed suicide on April 22, 2006, by jumping into the river Váh. His body was identified through DNA analysis on May 17, 2006, a month after it was found floating with his IDs in the river Váh.

=== Other testimonies ===
- Margita Szatmáryová- ex-wife of Karol Szatmáry. She confirmed that Szatmáry's testimony was given under pressure only so that he could get out of prison.
- Otakar N. - Slovak Information Service operative who was supposed to cooperate with Karol Szatmáry when apprehending a mafia member. Otakar N. denied this.
- Milan Reichel - alleged boss of the Poprad mafia. According to Szatmáry's testimony he coordinated the assassination with Miroslav Sýkora and they both recruited Oláh. Reichel denied this. As of 2006 he was still alive, recently being detained in the Czech Republic and extradited to Slovakia but he was released shortly after. Slovak police has offered him a status of a "protected witness", but Milan R. claims he has nothing to say about the case.
- Jozef H. - knew Imrich Oláh. He testified that he would have known if Oláh was involved. He claims to have last met him in October 1997, but according to the police, Oláh is dead since summer 1997. Despite this fact his testimony was declared trustworthy by the Prosecutor's Office.
- Peter Tóth - former journalist and Head of Counter-Intelligence at Slovak Information Service. According to his testimony, Sýkora did not know Roháč at that time and Sýkora could order the hit from Ukrainians or Russians who surrounded him at that time.
- Štefan C. - former close friend of Jozef Roháč. According to his testimony, if Roháč had anything in common with the murder, he would have known. He denied the testimony of Ondrej S. who testified that Roháč confessed to him about the crime. Ondrej S. also claimed that he helped hide Oláh because the police were looking for him.
- Štefan V. - knew Miroslav Sýkora. He testified that Sýkora did not know Roháč at the time of the crime.
- Ladislav T. - he could not say anything about the crime, it is not known why his testimony is used as a reason for dropping the charges.
- concealed witness - according to his or her testimony, Jozef Roháč was responsible for the explosion. He or she testified about a car that Roháč was supposed to use to drive to the crime scene and about a hut in Senec, that was supposed to be Roháč's hideout after the crime. According to other testimonies, the hut in question was already demolished at that time and the concealed witness' testimony is denied by several other witnesses.

== See also ==
- Crime in Slovakia
- Slovak Information Service
- Slovak mafia
- Vladimír Mečiar
- Jozef Roháč
