= Cuper =

Cuper (or Cúper) may refer to:

- Cuper's Cove, a 15th-century English settlement in SW Newfoundland, Canada
- Cuper's Gardens (also called Cupid's Gardens), a pleasure garden in London, U.K.

== People with the name ==
- Héctor Cúper (born 1955), Argentine footballer and manager
- Ján Cuper (1946–2025), Slovak politician and lawyer
- Philippe Cuper (born 1957), French clarinetist

== See also ==
- Cupper (disambiguation)
