= Ľubomír Dolgoš =

Slovak politician, educator and economist

Minister for Administration and Privatisation of National Property
- In office 1992 – June 1993
- Preceded by: Ivan Mikloš
- Succeeded by: Vladimír Mečiar

Member of the Federal Assembly
- In office 1992–1993

Personal details
- Born: 20 August 1956 Podbrezová, Czechoslovakia
- Died: 29 December 2004 (aged 48) Bratislava, Slovakia
- Party: HZDS; ANO
- Education: University of Economics in Bratislava
- Occupation: Politician, educator, writer, economist

Ľubomír Dolgoš (20 August 1956 – 29 December 2004) was a Slovak politician, educator and economist. He was former Minister of Administration and Privatization of National Property of the Slovak Republic in 1992–1993.

== Biography ==
Dolgoš was born on 20 August 1956 in Podbrezová, Czechoslovakia. ⁣He graduated from the Faculty of National Economy at the University of Economics in Bratislava (1979–1983). He was known primarily as an economist, but he did not shy away from the role of a public figure, politician, lecturer and researcher at the University of Economics. Before entering public life, Ľ. Dolgoš worked at the Institute of Economics of the Slovak Academy of Sciences.

=== President of the Slovak Antimonopoly Office ===
After 1990 Ľ. Dolgoš devoted himself not only to economic theory, but also to practice. He was at the birth of the Antimonopoly Office of the Slovak Republic (PÚ SR). In August 1991, the Public Against Violence (VPN) leadership tried to remove him from this position. The formal reason was the claim that he had failed to create a competitive environment in internal trade. At the end of February 1992 Ľ. Dolgoš himself resigned from the post of Chairman of the Antimonopoly Office of the Slovak Republic. As a reason for his resignation he stated that "the adoption of effective antitrust policy measures in the process of privatization of the Slovak Republic was impracticable" and that he had "discovered very close links between politicians – members of the ODÚ-VPN and the IPF".

=== Political career ===
Dolgoš was a minister in 1992–1993 in the government of Vladimír Mečiar. He resigned from politics on 15 June 1993. Before that, he served as a member of the HZDS in the Czechoslovak Federal Parliament.

After leaving politics, he worked for some time in the Association of Slovak Entrepreneurs (ZPS). He was a delegate of the ZPS at the World Economic Forum (SEF) in Davos in 1994. For a short time he worked in the editorial office of Hospodárske noviny. He was one of the few Slovak economists to study at Georgetown University in the USA. In 2001 he became involved in the Alliance of the New Citizens (ANO), of which he was the vice-chairman for economics until February 2002. He taught at the Faculty of Business Management of the University of Economics in Bratislava.

He died on 29 December 2004 in Bratislava at the age of 48 from severe injuries sustained in a car accident.
