= Dubová, Svidník District =

Dubová
- Municipality
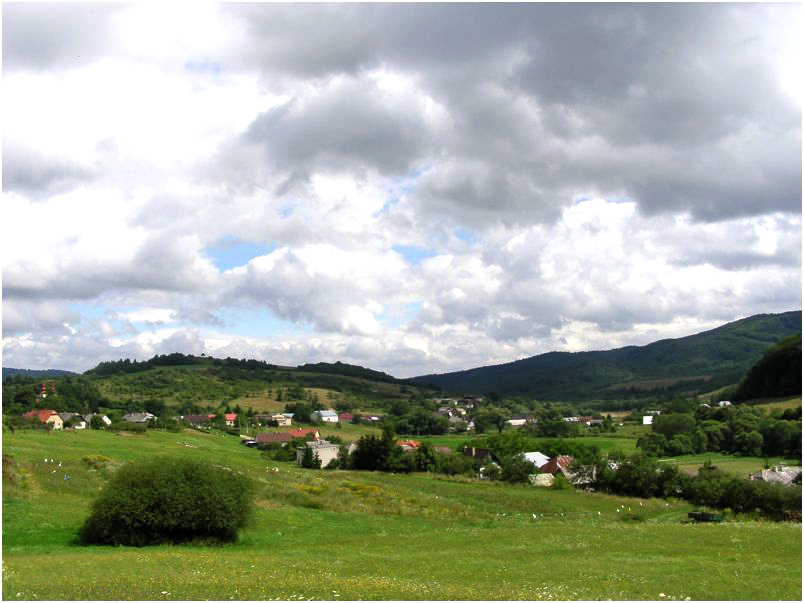

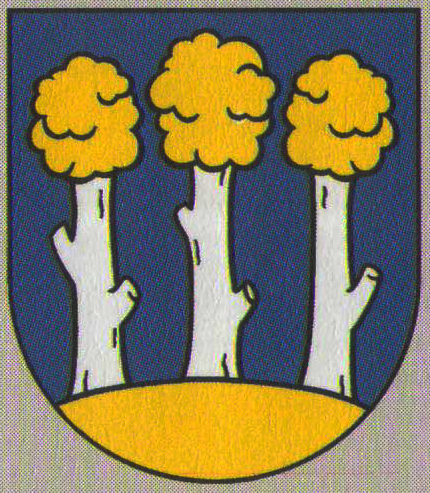
- Flag Coat of arms

- Location of Dubová in the Prešov Region Location of Dubová in Slovakia
- Coordinates: 49°21′48″N 21°25′57″E
- Country: Slovakia
- Region: Prešov Region
- District: Svidník District
- First mentioned: 1355

Area
  - Total: 12.54 km^{2} (4.84 sq mi)
- Elevation: 317 m (1,040 ft)

Population (2025)
  - Total: 193
- Time zone: UTC+1 (CET)
  - Summer (DST): UTC+2 (CEST)
- Postal code: 901 4
- Area code: +421 54
- Vehicle registration plate (until 2022): SK

Dubová (Rusyn: Дубова; Hungarian: Cseres, lit. 'oak grove', until 1899: Dubova) is a village and municipality in Svidník District in the Prešov Region of north-eastern Slovakia.

== History ==
In historical records the village was first mentioned in 1355.

== Geography ==
The municipality lies at an altitude of 317 metres (1,040 ft) and covers an area of 12.54 km^{2} (4.84 sq mi) (2025).

== Population ==
Population statistic (10 years)
Year	1995	2005	2015	2025
Count	241	221	218	193
Difference		−8.29%	−1.35%	−11.46%

Population statistic
Year	2024	2025
Count	195	193
Difference		−1.02%

It has a population of 193 people (31 December 2025).

=== Ethnicity ===
Census 2021 (1+ %)
Ethnicity	Number	Fraction
Slovak	139	69.5%
Rusyn	97	48.5%
Romani	13	6.5%
Ukrainian	7	3.5%
Not found out	4	2%
Total	200	

In year 2021 was 200 people by ethnicity 139 as Slovak, 97 as Rusyn, 13 as Romani, 7 as Ukrainian, 4 as Not found out, 1 as Serbian and 1 as Hungarian.

Note on population: The difference values of population numbers in the table "Population statistic" and in the sections "Ethnicity" & "Religion" is caused by the use of various statistical methods.

=== Religion ===
Census 2021 (1+ %)
Religion	Number	Fraction
Eastern Orthodox Church	82	41%
Greek Catholic Church	67	33.5%
None	30	15%
Roman Catholic Church	18	9%
Total	200	

In year 2021 was 200 people by religion 82 from Eastern Orthodox Church, 67 from Greek Catholic Church, 30 from None, 18 from Roman Catholic Church, 1 from Paganism and natural spirituality, 1 from Not found out and 1 from Other.

== Genealogical resources ==
The records for genealogical research are available at the state archive "Statny Archiv in Presov, Slovakia"

- Roman Catholic church records (births/marriages/deaths): 1695-1825 (parish B)

== Notable people ==
- Ján Cuper (1946–2025) - politician

== See also ==
- List of municipalities and towns in Slovakia
