= Cupper =

Cupper may refer to:

== People ==
- Marvin Cupper (born 1994), German ice hockey goaltender
- Ralph Cupper (born 1954), English organist, director, and composer
- Richard Cupper (died 1580s), English politician
- "The Cupper", nickname of Lee Grosscup (1936–2020), American football player

== Others ==
- Cupper, a person who engages in coffee cupping or coffee tasting
- Cuppers, a term for intercollegiate sporting competitions at the Universities of Oxford and Cambridge
- CUAFL Cuppers, a competition in the Cambridge University Association Football League

== See also ==
- Copper
- Cuper (disambiguation)
