= Leopoldov prison uprising =

Prison uprising in Czechoslovakia

Date	15–28 March 1990
Location	Leopoldov Prison, Czechoslovakia
Result	Uprising suppressed

Belligerents
Czechoslovakia	Rioters

Commanders and leaders
Colonel Andrej Sámel	Tibor Polgári

Strength
62 members of rapid deployment units; 150 paratroopers; 350 supervisors; 350 Ministry of the Interior members; 1,000 border guards; 512 police officers with 80 dogs	Initially 217 later, 1,006 men

Casualties and losses
11 wounded	1 killed and 29 wounded

Leopoldov prison uprising was the largest prison uprising in the former Czechoslovakia, which took place in 1990. The army was also deployed to suppress it. It was started by the amnesty of Václav Havel. It did not apply to all prisoners. The suppression of the rebellion drew admiration from foreign experts. Nevertheless, some journalists and politicians described the strike against prisoners as brutal, and the commander was dismissed.

== Uprising ==
On 15 March 1990, 217 prisoners in Leopoldov Prison went on hunger strike and pushed the guards out of their accommodation. Soon the number of rioters grew and the prison was overrun with convicts. The leader of the rebellion declared himself the director of the prison. 150 prisoners who refused to participate in the riot were held as hostages. The looting and destruction of the prison began. The security forces were waiting at this time.

It was only on March 28 that it was decided to resolve the situation quickly. The Deputy Minister of the Interior of the Slovak Republic, Andrej Sámel, was entrusted with this. At first he tried to negotiate. Finally, an intervention was made on 28 March 1990 which resulted in a two and half hour battle. 6 armored personnel carriers were also used during the attack. Prisoners used hand-made Molotov cocktails, metal bars with spikes, daggers, machetes, boxers or just razor blades. The attackers had to fight man-on-man. After 2 1/2 hours, the prison was occupied by security forces. The damage amounted to almost 30 million crowns at the time, and 5 buildings out of 11 were destroyed.

== Aftermath ==
The court in Bratislava tried 73 prisoners, of which 61 were convicted, 5 were acquitted and 6 were excluded for a separate trial. The sentences totaled 345 years and 10 months in prison. The maximum sentence was 14 1/2 years. Lowest 18 months.

On 23 November 1991, 7 prisoners escaped from Leopoldov. One of them was the leader of the Leopoldov uprising Polgári. During the event, 4 guards were killed (3 of them were killed by Polgári himself). They were all caught on the run. Polgári was eventually sentenced to life in prison and is considered a legend among the inmates.

== Popular culture ==
In 2019 Czech-Slovak film Amnesty which was inspired by the event was released.
