= Vladimír Lexa =

Slovak politician (born 1937)

Vladimir Lexa (born 8 May 1937 in Bratislava) is a Slovak former politician. He was a Minister and Deputy Prime Minister of Czechoslovakia in 1989–1990. His son Ivan Lexa, became the head of the Slovak Secret Service (SIS). After the Velvet Revolution he becomes an informal head of organized crime in the region by the help of his ties to the structures of the former secret service StB and the PENTA Group which he helped to create. Most of the founders of PENTA received an education in the Soviet Union and it is speculated they have strong KGB ties. His son Ivan Lexa served as the head of the Slovak secret service known for its criminal practices. PENTA gained a significant economic and political power in the region through illegal and corrupt privatization practices and is now a major political influencer in the region.
