= Corruption in Slovakia =

Corruption in Slovakia is a serious and ongoing problem.

== Extent ==
Transparency International’s 2021 Global Corruption Barometer indicates that corruption remains a problem in Slovakia: 19% of Slovaks surveyed thought corruption had increased during the previous year, and 11% had paid a bribe to a public sector worker. High-profile corruption cases have plagued the country, including the “Gorilla” case that surfaced at the end of 2011. In this case, secret wiretap recordings between 2005 and 2006 were leaked to the internet, bringing to light millions of Euros in bribes paid by a private equity firm to Slovak government officials in exchange for privatisation and procurement deals.

The 2021 Global Corruption Barometer asked Slovaks if most or all of the people in specific public, private, and NGO institutions were corrupt. The public servants pointed out by the largest percentage of survey respondents (41%) as corrupt were members of parliament, followed by judges and magistrates (34% of survey respondents), national government officials (31%), and the prime minister (30%). To combat corruption in the country, Slovakia has initiated several corruption reforms in recent years, including the creation of a central contract registry and publishing online all government contracts.

On Transparency International's 2025 Corruption Perceptions Index, Slovakia scored 48 on a scale from 0 ("highly corrupt") to 100 ("very clean"). When ranked by score, Slovakia ranked 61st among the 182 countries in the Index, where the country ranked first is perceived to have the most honest public sector. For comparison with regional scores, the best score among Western European and European Union countries (Note: Austria, Belgium, Bulgaria, Croatia, Cyprus, Czechia, Denmark, Estonia, Finland, France, Germany, Greece, Hungary, Iceland, Ireland, Italy, Latvia, Lithuania, Luxembourg, Malta, Netherlands, Norway, Poland, Portugal, Romania, Slovakia, Slovenia, Spain, Sweden, Switzerland, and the United Kingdom.) was 89, the average score was 64 and the worst score was 40. For comparison with worldwide scores, the best score was 89 (ranked 1), the average score was 42, and the worst score was 9 (ranked 181, in a two-way tie).

Transparency International wrote of Slovakia in 2025:

In one year under Robert Fico’s government, Slovakia’s (49) score has sharply declined as numerous reforms erode anti-corruption checks and bypass public consultation. The government dissolved the Special Prosecutor’s Office and the police's National Crime Agency, responsible for fighting corruption and serious crimes. Combined with reduced statutes of limitations, lightened corruption penalties, and waived potential sentences, these changes have limited the ability to prosecute perpetrators in ongoing cases and have fostered impunity in some high-level cases. Political appointments, bypassing of standard legislative procedures, and the government’s undermining of independent institutions and media, along with attacks against NGOs through Russian-style “foreign agent” narratives, have sparked significant backlash from citizens and civil society.

In August 2019, the Council of Europe’s Group of States against Corruption (GRECO) urged Slovakia to make more progress on the effectiveness of its legal framework and policies to stop corruption among employees with top executive positions and the police force.

== Areas ==
=== Business ===
Corruption is ranked as the second most problematic factor for doing business in Slovakia, according to the World Economic Forum's after inefficient government bureaucracy. Surveyed business executives report that public funds are often diverted to companies, individuals, or groups due to corruption, and the lack of ethical behaviour by companies in their interactions with public officials, politicians, and other companies represents a serious business disadvantage for the country.

Companies consider the occurrence of irregular payments and bribes to be fairly common in connection with imports and exports, public utilities, annual tax payment, awarding of public contracts and licences, or obtaining favourable judicial decisions.

== See also ==
- Crime in Slovakia
- Police corruption in Slovakia
