= Prisons in Slovakia =

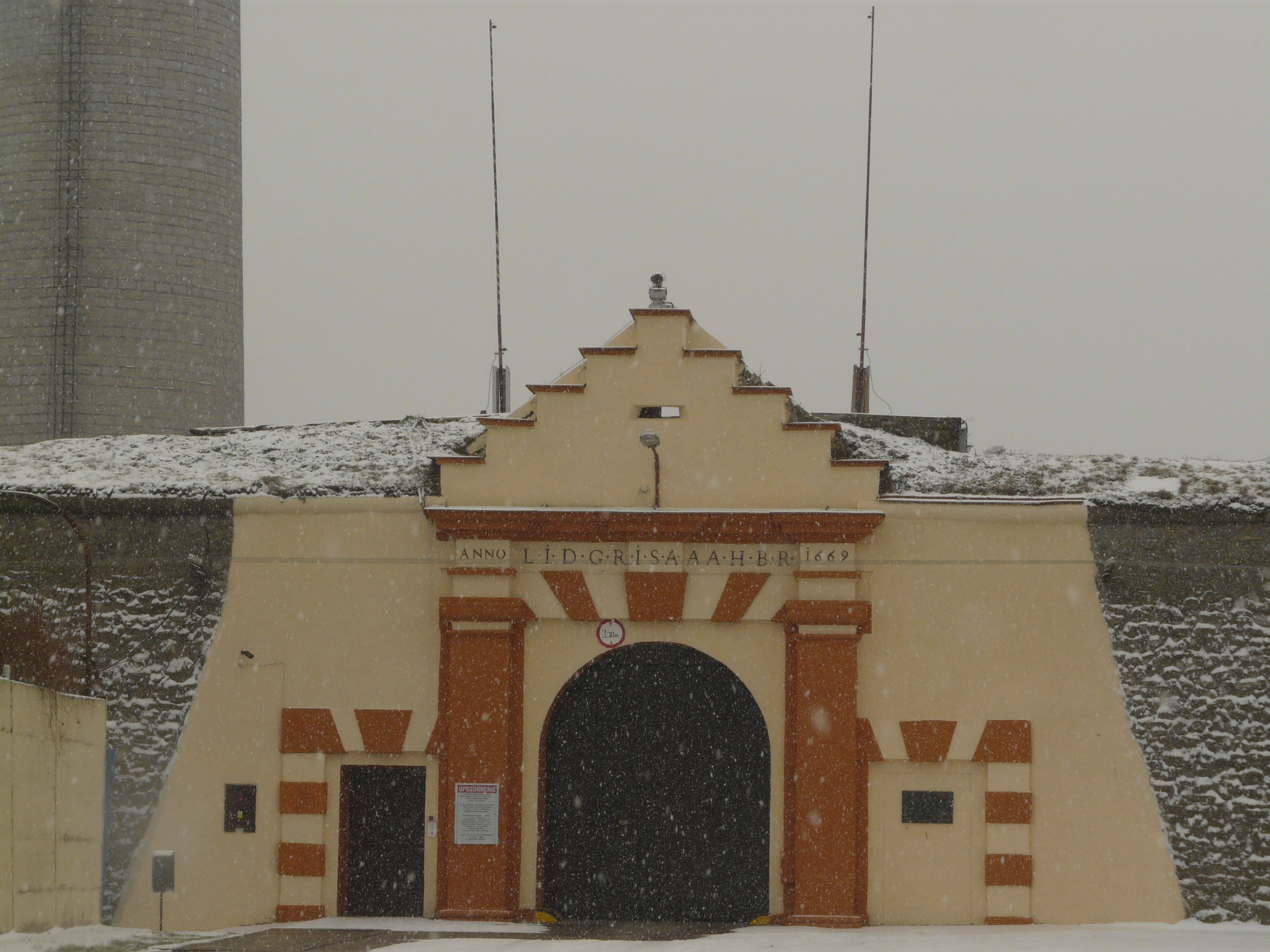
Leopoldov Prison, the biggest prison in Slovakia

Prisons in Slovakia are fully owned and operated by the state. In 2004, Slovakia had 8 891 prisoners, representing 165 per 100 000 of the national population. As of January 2019 the prison population has risen to 10 372 prisoners (190 per 100 000 citizens). As of 2019, Slovakia had 18 correctional institutions capable of holding 11 499 inmates. Of these, five are devoted to pre-trial detainees, nine for sentenced prisoners, and four for a combination of sentenced prisoners and pre-trial detainees.

The prison system is administered by the Slovak General Directorate of the Prison and Court Guard Corps (current Director General is Col. Milan Ivan, operating under authority of the Ministry of Justice of the Slovak Republic.) Current occupancy level of the Slovak prison system is 90.2%. As recently as 2010, in stated concerns from Slovak newspaper SME, there had been no place for convicted criminals evading their sentences, if they were to be arrested by the Slovak police, there would have been simply be no place where to detain them. According to the Slovak Ministry of Justice, the number of convicted prisoners was critical, despite the fact that 9 prisons lowered the minimal space per prisoner to lower values than mandated by law.

== Vital statistics ==
Slovak prisoners and prison population per 100,000 inhabitants
Year	Prisoners total	Prison population per 100,000 inhabitants
1992	6 610	124
1995	7 899	147
1998	6 628	123
2001	7 433	138
2004	9 422	175
2007	7 986	148
2010	10 031	184
2019	10 372	190

== History ==
Czechoslovakia inherited a prison system from Austria-Hungary that is considered relatively progressive, with the facilities cited as being among the better prisons in Europe. As late as during the 1940s the prison system still incorporated the Leopoldov structure, originally built in 1669 to defend against the Turkish invaders. Between 1865 and 1952, Slovakia's prison system was controlled by the General Directorate of the Corps of Prison and Court Guard, under the Ministry of Justice, an organisational scheme similar to the one still in use today.

The country's oldest prisons date from the 17th century. Two of the largest prisons, Leopoldov Prison and Ilava Prison were reconstructed from an army fortress and a monastery respectively, both during Austria-Hungary. The largest prisons have a capacity of 600 - 900 prisoners.

=== Prison unrest of 1989 ===
At the end of 1989, Czechoslovakia overthrew communism in its velvet revolution. Coinciding with the social and political changes outside, prisoners all around the country became rebellious. In Slovakia, the unrest started in December 1989 in Zeliezovce prison. In many prisons the inmates constructed simple banners out of bed sheets with slogans similar to those worn by protesters in the squares. Also, the prisoners started organizing themselves creating self-governing commissions and choosing spokespersons to represent their demands. Prison unrest became the focus of daily news coverage in Slovakia and situation escalated to the point, where several government ministers and the prime minister personally came to conduct negotiations to Leopoldov Prison.

== Description ==
The most serious offenders are housed at Ilava, Leopoldov, or Ružomberok.

In 2011 the average cost of imprisoning one person in Slovakia was 37.26 euro per day. Each prisoner and detainee is obliged by law to pay 3.09 euro per day, an obligation that many people manage to evade. The total unpaid sum rose to 11.7 million euro as of June 2011.

In the years 2012-2013 the Prison and Court Guard Corps is planning to re-equip its officers with new pistols and machine guns, yet the new arms are not part of the State Budget.

== List of prisons ==
The Prison and Court Guard Service (ZVJS; Slovak: Zbor väzenskej a justičnej stráže) publishes a list of prisons in Slovakia.

=== Remand prisons and correctional facilities ===
- Banská Bystrica Remand Prison and Prison
- Bratislava Remand Prison and Prison
- Ilava Prison
- Košice Remand Prison and Prison
- Leopoldov Prison
- Nitra Remand Prison and Prison Nitra
- Prešov Remand Prison and Prison
- Žilina Remand Prison and Prison

=== Correctional facilities ===
- Banská Bystrica - Kráľová Prison
- Dubnica nad Váhom Prison
- Hrnčiarovce nad Parnou Prison
- Košice - Šaca Prison
- Levoča Prison
- Nitra - Chrenová Prison
- Ružomberok Prison
- Sučany Prison for Juveniles
- Trenčín Prison Hospital and Prison
- Želiezovce Prison

== Known issues in the prison system ==
- inadequate security surveillance
- lengthening of pre-trial detention leading to overcrowding
- low morale and salaries of prison staff
- continuity in prison staff from the communist era (the brutality of some of the prison staff was one of the main reasons for the Leopoldov Prison uprising, an issue that remains to be addressed until today)
- lack of budgets for improvement

== See also ==
- Life imprisonment in Slovakia
- Leopoldov Prison
