= Sedlice, Prešov District =

Sedlice
- Municipality
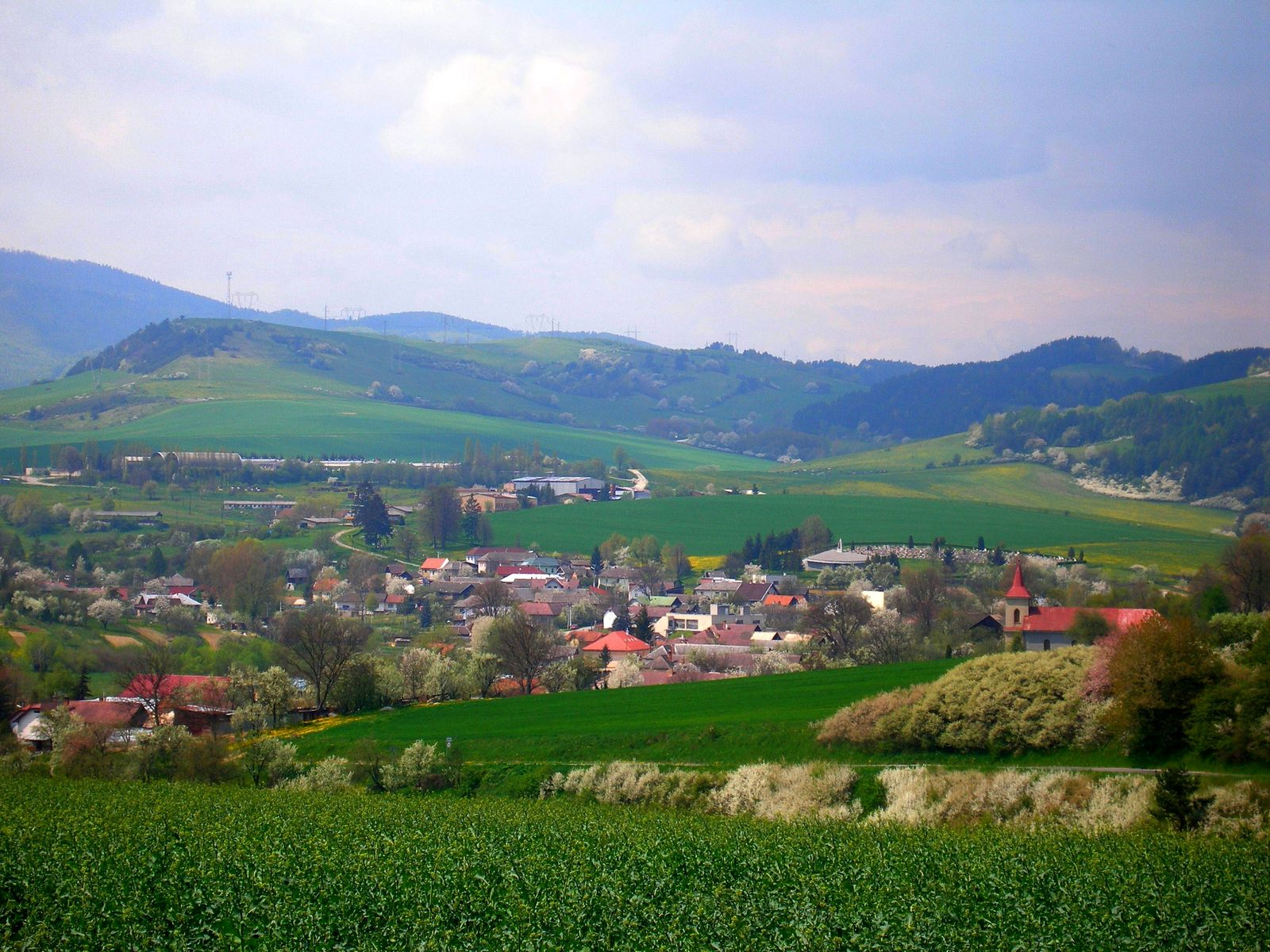

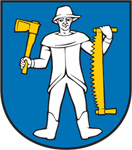
- Flag Coat of arms
- Interactive map of Sedlice
- Coordinates: 48.92°N 21.12°E
- Country: Slovakia
- Region: Prešov Region
- District: Prešov District
- First mentioned: 1330

Area
  - Total: 15.56 km^{2} (6.01 sq mi)
- Elevation: 428 m (1,404 ft)

Population (2025)
  - Total: 925
- Time zone: UTC+1 (CET)
  - Summer (DST): UTC+2 (CEST)
- Postal code: 824 3
- Area code: +421 51
- Vehicle registration plate (until 2022): PO
- Website: www.sedlice.sk

Sedlice (Hungarian: Szedlice) is a village and municipality in Prešov District in the Prešov Region of eastern Slovakia.

== History ==
In historical records the village was first mentioned in 1330.

== Geography ==
The municipality lies at an altitude of 428 metres (1,404 ft) and covers an area of 15.56 km^{2} (6.01 sq mi) (2025).

== Population ==
Population statistic (10 years)
Year	1995	2005	2015	2025
Count	1016	1044	1051	925
Difference		+2.75%	+0.67%	−11.98%

Population statistic
Year	2024	2025
Count	939	925
Difference		−1.49%

It has a population of 925 people (31 December 2025).

=== Ethnicity ===
Census 2021 (1+ %)
Ethnicity	Number	Fraction
Slovak	954	97.44%
Not found out	18	1.83%
Total	979	

In year 2021 was 979 people by ethnicity 954 as Slovak, 18 as Not found out, 5 as Ukrainian, 4 as Rusyn, 4 as Other, 2 as Austrian, 1 as Czech and 1 as German.

Note on population: The difference values of population numbers in the table "Population statistic" and in the sections "Ethnicity" & "Religion" is caused by the use of various statistical methods.

=== Religion ===
Census 2021 (1+ %)
Religion	Number	Fraction
Roman Catholic Church	779	79.57%
Greek Catholic Church	86	8.78%
None	76	7.76%
Not found out	17	1.74%
Evangelical Church	10	1.02%
Total	979	

In year 2021 was 979 people by religion 779 from Roman Catholic Church, 86 from Greek Catholic Church, 76 from None, 17 from Not found out, 10 from Evangelical Church, 4 from Islam, 1 from Eastern Orthodox Church, 1 from Other and not ascertained christian church, 1 from Jehovah's Witnesses, 1 from Christian Congregations in Slovakia, 1 from Church of the Brethren, 1 from Buddhism and 1 from Ad hoc movements.
