= Antimonopoly Office of the Slovak Republic =

Central state administration body of the Slovak Republic

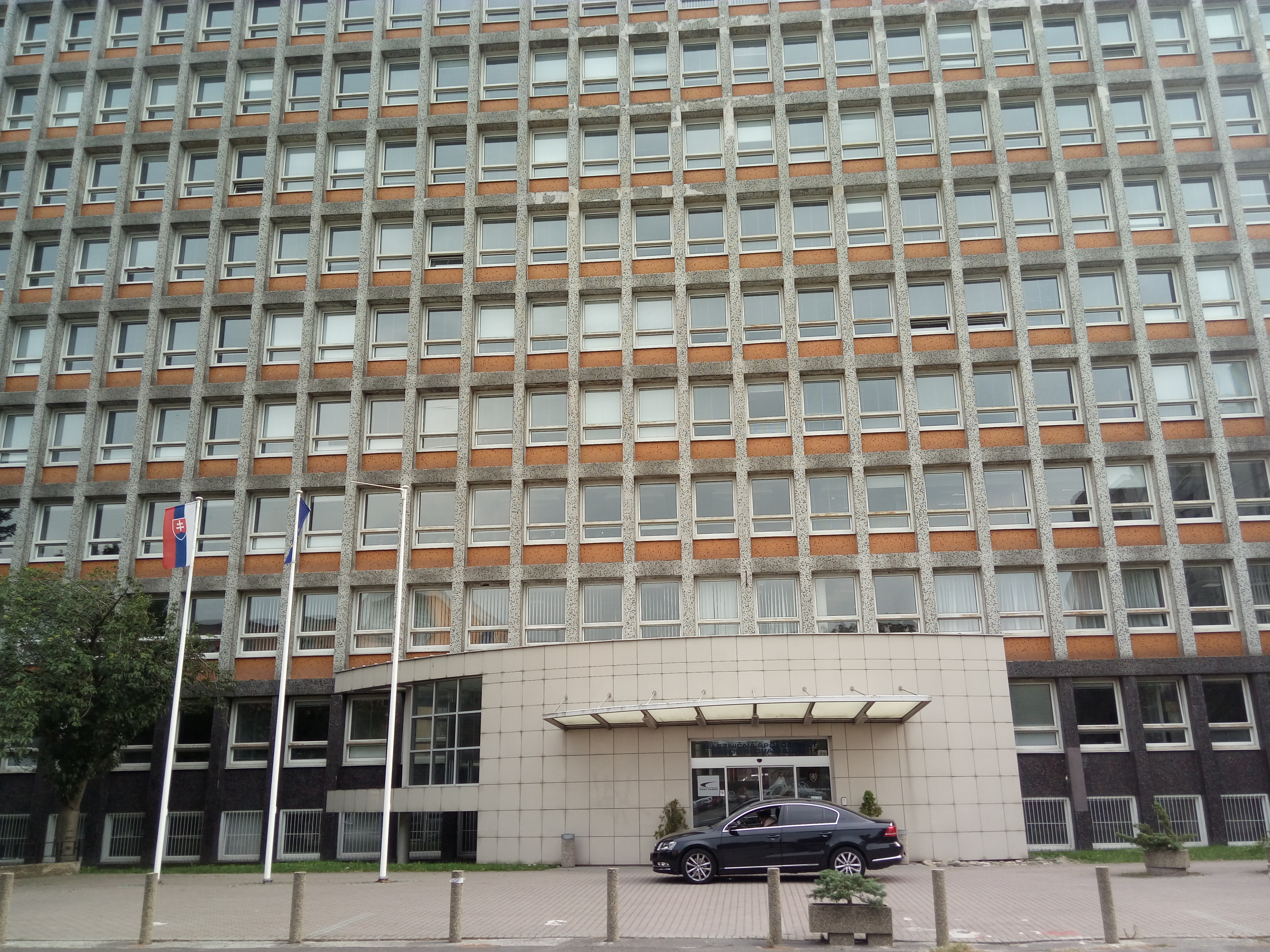
The office is located at 24 Drieňova Street in Bratislava

The Antimonopoly Office of the Slovak Republic (PMÚ SR) is the central state administration body of the Slovak Republic for the protection and promotion of competition. It intervenes, for example, in the case of cartels or abuse of a dominant position on the market.

It is headed by a chairman who is appointed and dismissed by the President of the Slovak Republic on the proposal of the Government of the Slovak Republic for a term of five years.

The current chairman has been Juraj Beňa since March 2023.
