= Vojenská spravodajská služba =

Vojenská spravodajská služba (Military Intelligence Service) was a military intelligence agency for the government and armed forces of Slovakia. On 1 January 2013 it was merged with the Vojenské obranné spravodajstvo (VOS) and created the Vojenské spravodajstvo.
