= Vojenské spravodajstvo =

Slovak military intelligence agency

Military Intelligence
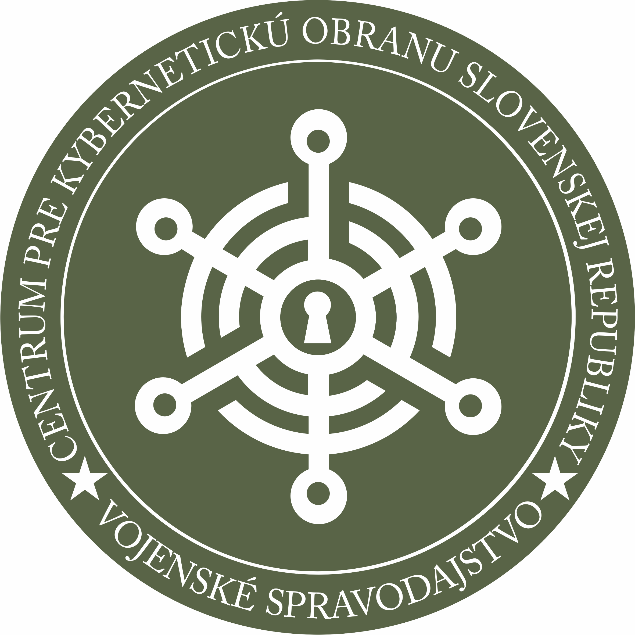
- Active: 2013-present
- Country: Slovakia
- Branch: Slovak Ground Forces
- Type: Military intelligence
- Role: Intelligence gathering network
- Website: https://vs.mosr.sk/

Vojenské spravodajstvo (English: Military Intelligence) is a military intelligence agency of the Slovak Republic operating under the Ministry of Defence. It was established on 1 January 2013 by merging the Vojenská spravodajská služba (VSS) and the Vojenské obranné spravodajstvo (VOS).

== History ==
History of Military Intelligence

The establishment of Military Intelligence was part of the program statement of the second government of Robert Fico from May 2012, which stated that "The government will propose the merger of military intelligence services and more effective mechanisms for controlling intelligence services and other components working with intelligence methods". The National Council of Deputies approved the law on 19 September 2012 with 84 votes, and President Ivan Gašparovič signed it on 5 October 2012.

Fico's cabinet also "committed to preventing the leakage of classified materials and ensuring the growth of the credibility of the secret services". The merger of the services was criticized by the opposition, who believed that the merger would not bring these results. According to estimates from the Minister of Defense Martin Glváč (SMER-SD) in 2012, the unification of military intelligence should have brought up to 19% savings in 2014.

On January 1, 2013, Ľubomír Skuhra, the previous director of the Military Defense Intelligence, became the first director of the Military Intelligence. His deputy is Róbert Tibenský, the Radič government's nominee for the post of director of the VSS. Ľubomír Skuhra was supposed to start his career in the criminal police, during Lex's time he worked in the SIS and was also supposed to work for the Customs Criminal Department.

At the end of April 2021, the Ministry of Defense announced that it was preparing an amendment that would allow the Military Intelligence to "perform its tasks more effectively". The comment procedure should be in July or August 2021.
