= Slovenská informačná služba =

Slovak governmental intelligence agency

Slovak Information Service
- Slovenská informačná služba (SIS)
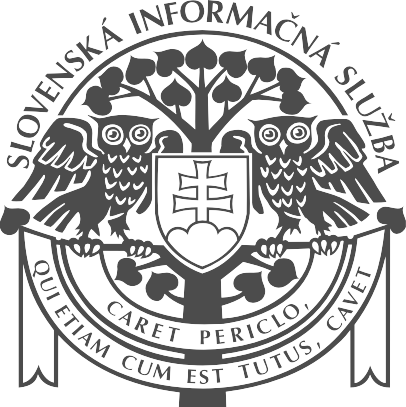
- Seal of the Slovak Information Service

Agency overview
- Formed: 15 February 1993
- Preceding agency: (Czechoslovak) Federal Security Information Service
- Jurisdiction: Government of Slovakia
- Headquarters: Vajnorská Street 39, Bratislava
- Motto: Caret periculo, qui etiam cum est tutus cavet
- Annual budget: €94 747 839 (2025)
- Agency executive: Pavol Gašpar
- Parent agency: Security Council of the Slovak Republic
- Website: SIS website

Slovak Information Service (Slovak: Slovenská informačná služba, SIS) is an intelligence agency of the government of Slovakia. It was established on February 15, 1993, as a descendant of the Federálna bezpečnostná informačná služba (the domestic intelligence agency of Czechoslovakia).

Slovenská informačná služba uses integrated intelligence model, which means it covers both domestic and foreign intelligence. Only military intelligence is covered by separate intelligence agency Vojenské spravodajstvo.

== History ==
Independent Slovak Republic was formed on January 1, 1993, after Czechoslovakia existence ended on 31 December 1992 and with it its domestic intelligence agency Federal Security Information Service (Federálna bezpečnostná informačná služba (FBIS)). On legal ground Slovakia was without intelligence service in the first days of its existence. On January 21, 1993, Slovak parliament passed Act No. 46/1993 Coll., on Slovak information service, which became effective on February 15, 1993.

Slovak information service was established on February 15, 1993, as a descendant of the Federálna bezpečnostná informačná služba FBIS (the domestic intelligence agency of Czechoslovakia), but unlike its predecessor it is also charged with foreign intelligence. Separate foreign intelligence agency as a descendant to Czechoslovak Office for Foreign Relations and Information of the Federal Ministry of the Interior was not created in Slovakia. Its first director was Vladimír Mitro, who two years later asked the President of Slovakia to accept his resignation. Mitro later claimed that the reason for this was huge political pressure on him, especially the command to establish surveillance of certain journalists.

The government of Vladimír Mečiar then changed the law to give the permission to name the SIS director to itself, rather than the President of Slovakia. Mečiar then named Ivan Lexa the director of SIS. Under Lexa, SIS became internationally known for numerous controversies including the kidnapping of President's son to Austria and his light torture in 1995, the Assassination of Róbert Remiáš in 1996 and many more.

On 3 May 2012 President Ivan Gašparovič appointed Ján Valko to the post of Slovak Intelligence Service director, after Valko was nominated by Prime Minister Robert Fico and his candidacy was approved by the Slovak Government on 27 April 2012.

On 6 July 2016, President Andrej Kiska appointed Ing. Anton Šafárik to the director post.

On 15 April 2020, President Zuzana Čaputová appointed Vladimír Pčolinský to the director post. On 11 March 2021, National Crime Agency of Police force arrested director Pčolinský on charges of corruption. 3 days later Pčolinský resigned from his post as director and was removed from position, and employment of agency, by President Čaputová on 18 March 2021.

== Tasks of SIS ==
The Slovak Information Service, as with similar agencies in other countries, serves the following purposes:

- Protection of the Slovak Republic from foreign spies and reconnaissance services.
- Protection of confidential documents.
- Protecting the interests of the Slovak Republic.

SIS also handles tasks usually reserved for the police force:

- Protection of the Slovak Republic from computer crimes and crimes using high-tech technology.
- Fight against criminal organizations and companies.
- Ensure the safety of the citizens of the Slovak Republic.

Finally, SIS is also charged with protecting the civil rights of Slovak citizens.

== Directors of SIS ==
- Vladimír Mitro, JUDr. – 21 January 1993 – 23 February 1995
- Ivan Lexa, Ing. – 18 April 1995 – 27 October 1998
- Rudolf Žiak – 27 October – 3 November 1998
- Vladimír Mitro, JUDr. – 3 November 1998 – 31 March 2003
- Ladislav Pittner – 4 April 2003 – 26 July 2006
- Jozef Magala – 27 July 2006 – 25 August 2010
- Karol Mitrík – 25 August 2010 – 3 May 2012
- Ján Valko – 3 May 2012 – 6 July 2016
- Anton Šafárik – 6 July 2017 – 6 April 2020
- Vladimír Pčolinský – 6 April 2020 – 18 March 2021
- JUDr. Michal Aláč, PhD. – 6 May 2021 – 23 August 2023
- Tomáš Rulíšek – in charge of management, 23 August 2023 – 26 August 2024
- Pavol Gašpar – 26. August 2024 – now

== See also ==
- Vladimír Mečiar
- Jaroslav Svěchota
- Crime in Slovakia
- Vojenské spravodajstvo - military intelligence agency in Slovakia
