= Ivan Lexa =

Slovak politician (born 1961)

Ivan Lexa, Ing. (born August 18, 1961 in Bratislava) is the former head of the Slovak Secret Service from 1995 to 1998. One of the closest allies of the former autocratic Prime Minister of Slovakia Vladimír Mečiar, under Lexa the Secret Service committed numerous high-profile politically motivated crimes.

In 2000, Ivan Lexa fled Slovakia and became an international fugitive and target of an intense search by the Interpol. He was captured in 2002 in Umhlanga, South Africa and extradited back to Slovakia. In the meantime, Lexa changed his looks, losing weight and gaining muscle and tan, making his appearance the focus of cover pages in Slovak media. Slovak courts have never found Ivan Lexa guilty of any wrongdoing and in two cases Lexa was covered by the amnesties granted by then acting President Vladimír Mečiar.

== Life and career ==
Ivan Lexa was born into an influential and wealthy family, his father Vladimír Lexa senior was a minister in communist Czechoslovakia. He studied inorganic technology at CHTF SVŠT. Later he was employed in the Slovnaft refinery.

== Political career ==
In January 1991, Prime minister Vladimír Mečiar made Ivan Lexa the head of the Office of the Government of Slovakia. After Mečiar's political party HZDS won the election in 1992, he was reinstated in this position. In 1993, Mečiar's government tried to make Ivan Lexa the Minister of Privatisation, something that is in the competence of the President of Slovakia. President Michal Kováč however refused to elect him, saying

Mr. Lexa does not fulfill the requirements for executing this office and neither does he have my personal trust.

To walk around this obstacle, the government made Lexa the Deputy head of the Ministry of Privatisation, while letting the post of Minister vacant, making Lexa de facto run the Ministry.

== Slovak Secret Service ==
After the Slovak parliamentary election, 1994, members of the parliament representing HZDS arranged for a change in the law, making the parliament elect the head of the Slovak Secret Service, instead of the President. On April 18, 1995 Vladimír Mečiar named Ivan Lexa the Director of Slovak Secret Service.

In this position he began several operations, some of which have since been published in the Slovak media.

- Unlawful wiretapping and spying
- Abduction of the President's son into another country, including light torture
- Hiring of non-existing members of the Secret Service
- High-profile assassination of Róbert Remiáš in 1996, reputed to be a mafia hit under contract from within the Secret Service

On April 9, 1999, the Slovak parliament elected to take away Lexa's immunity as a member of parliament, and handed him over to the police for suspicion of abduction, robbery, not announcing the theft of a vehicle, feigned buying of a painting, helping in placing an explosive system and for the unlawful holding of a spying device.

Ivan Lexa was put in jail on April 15, 1999, and released after 95 days, on July 19, 1999. Afterwards Lexa checked sick at work (the parliament) and disappeared. As efforts to locate him were unsuccessful and on July 10, 2000, Interpol started a world-wide search.

== See also ==
- Vladimír Mečiar
- Crime in Slovakia
