= Crime in Slovakia =

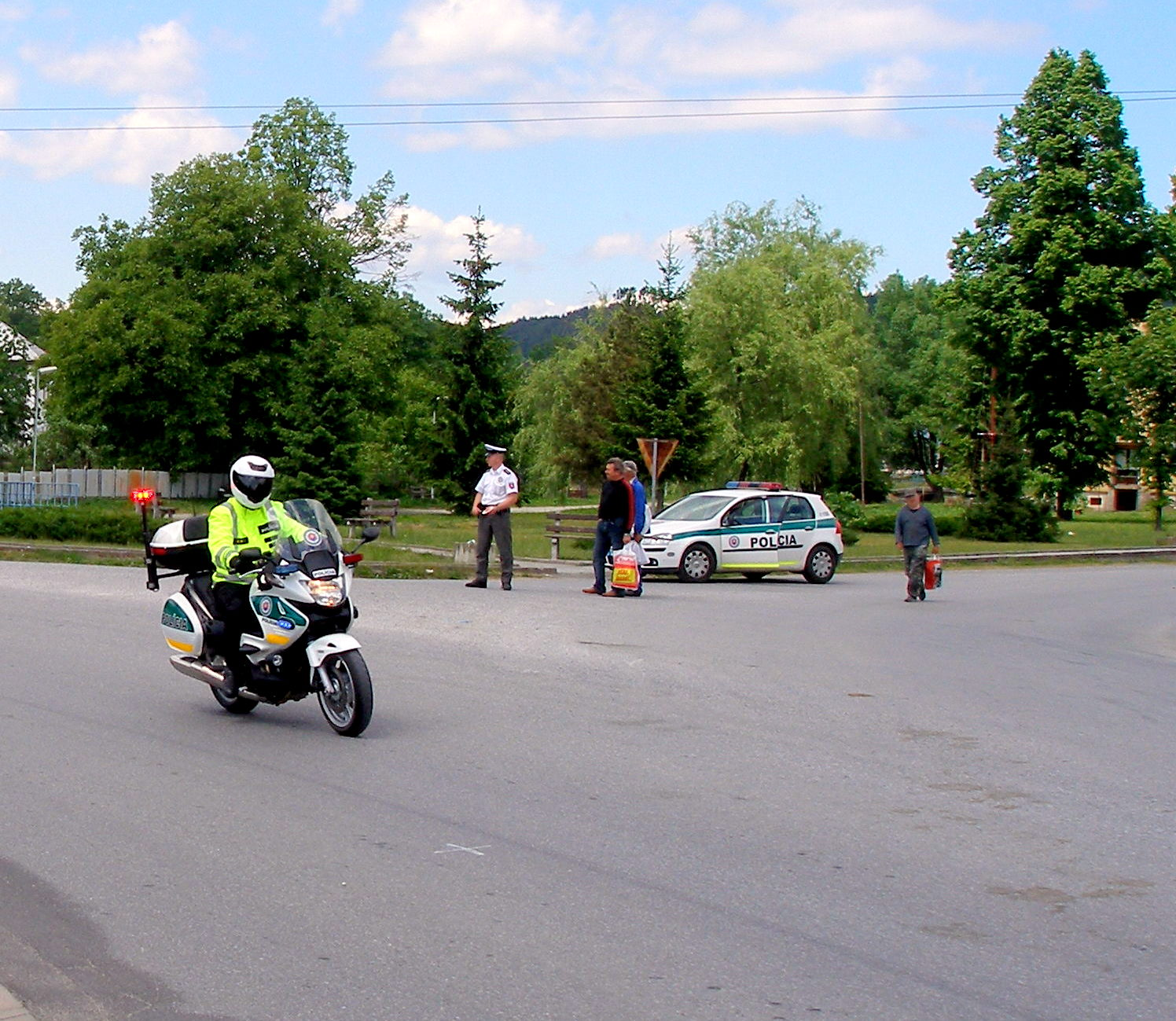
Slovak police in Sedlice.

Slovakia (population 5.4 million) is a Central European country with a history of relatively low crime. While crime became more widespread after the revolutions of 1989, it remains low when compared to many other post-communist countries.

Slovakia employs numerous law enforcement bodies and secret services in fighting crime, yet according to numerous opinion polls the Police together with the Secret Services are some of the least trusted institutions in the country.

== Crime by type ==
=== Murder ===
In 2018, Slovakia had a murder rate of 1.37 per 100,000 population. There was a total of 57 murders in Slovakia in 2016.

=== Violence and theft ===
Apart from the occasional mafia shootings, gun violence in Slovakia is rare. There are approximately 3,000 – 4,000 home burglaries and 7,000 – 8,000 car thefts in Slovakia each year. Together, there are around 15,000 cases of violent criminal acts (damage to victim's life or health) in Slovakia every year.

=== Illegal drug trade ===
Slovak Republic is a party to the 1988 UN Convention Against Illicit Traffic in Narcotic Drugs and Psychotropic Substances, the 1961 UN Single Convention on Narcotic Drugs, the 1972 Protocol thereto, and the 1971 UN Convention on Psychotropic Substances. Not only the manufacture and selling of certain drugs is illegal but also their possession. Slovak law does not differentiate between hard drugs and soft drugs and sentences can in theory be as harsh as life imprisonment.

Until the mid-1990s the drug situation in Slovakia remained somewhat stable; extensive small-scale illicit amphetamine production, no opium poppy cultivation, only minimal cannabis cultivation in private greenhouses and the country was already a key transit point for smuggling Asian heroin to Western Europe both via Ukraine and lying on the "Balkan route" from Turkey. Seizures of cocaine up to this point have been minimal and at this time Slovakia emerged as another crossroads for cocaine traffickers seeking new routes to Western Europe (Colombian traffickers have been smuggling cocaine through the neighboring Czech Republic since 1991). Because the banking sector in Slovakia was still in nascent stages at this time, drug money laundering operations were limited.

In November 1995, an independent national drug service was created in Slovakia and the government established a new comprehensive anti-drug plan to target drug trafficking and use and made drug-related changes to the criminal code. The biggest seizures made by the Slovak police in 1995 were a 123.5 kilogram heroin seizure, and a 25 kilogram cocaine seizure. Implementation of chemical control regulations and legislation continues to create concern about the vulnerability of the country's well-developed chemical and pharmaceutical industry being partially used for the production of illegal drugs or precursor chemicals.

=== Organized crime ===
The Slovak mafia constitutes various organized crime groups in Slovakia, controlled primarily by Slovak interests. The Slovak mafia does not have significant international presence and even in Slovakia, their activities are limited by boundaries set by the powerful Russian mafia, Ukrainian mafia, Chechen mafia, and various Balkan groups controlling much of the heroin trade.

The Slovak mafia is traditionally especially active in security business, construction and ownership of restaurants and nightclubs. According to the United States Department of State, "Both indigenous and foreign organized crime groups are well established in Slovakia". Under Slovak law, the creation, membership, activity, or support of an organized crime group constitutes a crime.

In its modern form, the mafia is a young phenomenon in Slovakia, having truly emerged only after the revolutions of 1989. According to known Slovak sociologist Pavol Haulik from the MVK poll agency, "We can state that people imagine that the mafia has a very strong influence in Slovakia". In 2005, a list of mafia members, families and "special interest groups" suspected by the Slovak police leaked to the public, complete with lists of registered weapons and vehicles followed by two leaks of updated lists in 2011.

Some groups may not meet the definition of a mafia-style group; therefore they can be referred to as criminal networks, or loose networks of associates engaging in criminal activity.

=== Corruption ===
Transparency International’s Global Corruption Barometer 2013 indicates that corruption remains a serious problem in Slovakia.

== Crime dynamics ==
During the 1990s, there were 2,300 reported crimes per 100,000 citizens in Slovakia. In comparison with the neighboring countries - it was 3,200 in Hungary, 3,400 in Poland, 4,100 in the Czech Republic and 6,100 in Austria.

From 1989 to 1999, the number of crime perpetrators has slightly risen from over 35,000 in 1989 to almost 45,000 in 1999. The number of perpetrators not convicted remains stable at some 80 percent of total perpetrators. Also somewhat stable is the number of habitual offenders at approximately 10,000.

The 2000s saw again a slight rise in the number of perpetrators and a steep rise in economic crime.

== See also ==
- Slovak mafia
- Law enforcement in Slovakia
- Human trafficking in Slovakia
- Corruption in Slovakia
- List of political scandals in Slovakia
