= Dzurinda's Second Cabinet =

- 5th Cabinet of Slovakia
- 16 October 2002 – 4 July 2006
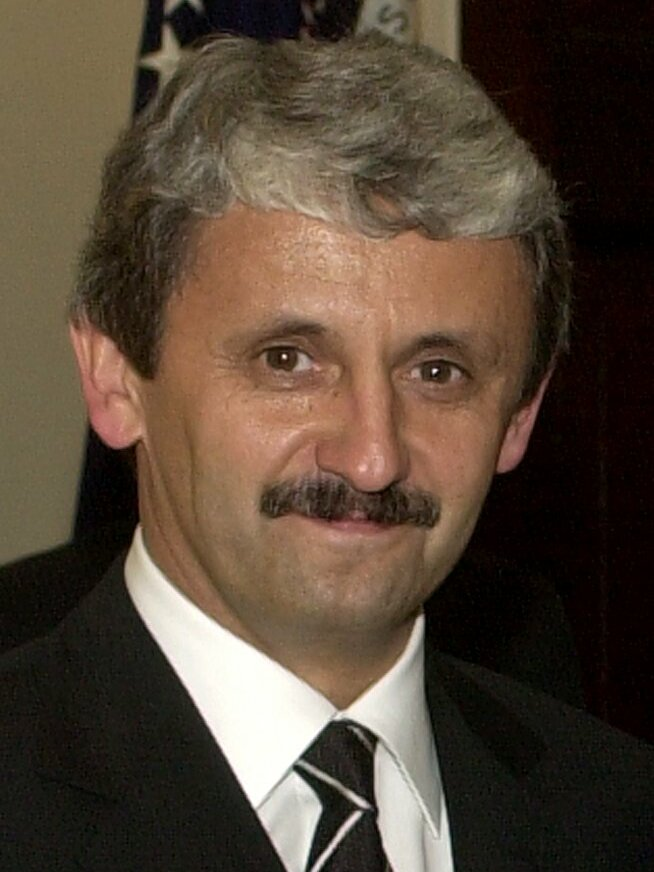
- Mikuláš Dzurinda in 2008
- Date formed: 16 October 2002
- Date dissolved: 4 July 2006

People and organisations
- Head of state: Rudolf Schuster (2002 – 2004); Ivan Gašparovič (2004–2006)
- Head of government: Mikuláš Dzurinda
- No. of ministers: 16
- Ministers removed: 10
- Total no. of members: 25
- Member party: SDKÚ; KDH (2002–2006); ANO (2002–2005); SMK
- Status in legislature: Majority Coalition (2002–2004); Minority Coalition (2004–2006)
- Opposition party: HZDS; KDH (2006); Smer; KSS
- Opposition leader: Vladimír Mečiar (2002–2005); Robert Fico (2005–2006)

History
- Incoming formation: 2002
- Outgoing formation: 2006
- Election: 2002 Slovak parliamentary election
- Predecessor: Dzurinda's First Cabinet
- Successor: Fico's First Cabinet

Between 16 October 2002 and 4 July 2006, prime minister of Slovakia Mikuláš Dzurinda formed his second cabinet in his second consecutive term in this office.

== Government ministers ==
Office	Minister	Political Party	In office
Prime Minister	Mikuláš Dzurinda	SDKÚ	16 October 2002 – 4 July 2006
Minister of Transport, Posts and Telecommunications	Pavol Prokopovič	SDKÚ	16 October 2002 – 4 July 2006
Minister of Labour, Social Affairs and Family	Ľudovít Kaník	SDKÚ	16 October 2002 – 17 October 2005
Minister of Labour, Social Affairs and Family	Iveta Radičová	SDKÚ	17 October 2005 – 4 July 2006
Minister of Finance	Ivan Mikloš	SDKÚ	16 October 2002 – 4 July 2006
Minister of Economy	Robert Nemcsics	ANO	16 October 2002 – 9 September 2003
Minister of Economy	Pavol Prokopovič Acting)	SDKÚ	10 September 2003 – 23 September 2003
Minister of Economy	Pavol Rusko	ANO	23 September 2003 – 24 August 2005
Minister of Economy	Ivan Mikloš (Acting)	SDKÚ	24 August 2005 – 4 October 2005
Minister of Economy	Jirko Malchárek	Nonpartisan	4 October 2005 – 4 July 2006
Minister of Agriculture	Zsolt Simon	SMK	16 October 2002 – 4 July 2006
Minister of Interior	Vladimír Palko	KDH	16 October 2002 – 8 February 2006
Minister of Interior	Martin Pado	SDKÚ	8 February 2006 – 4 July 2006
Minister of Defence	Ivan Šimko	SDKÚ	16 October 2002 – 24 September 2003
Minister of Defence	Eduard Kukan (Acting)	SDKÚ	4 September 2003 – 10 October 2003
Minister of Defence	Juraj Liška	SDKÚ	10 October 2003 – 1 February 2006
Minister of Defence	Martin Fedor	SDKÚ	1 February 2006 – 4 July 2006
Minister of Justice	Daniel Lipšic	KDH	16 October 2002 – 8 February 2006
Minister of Justice	Lucia Žitňanská	SDKÚ	8 February 2006 – 4 July 2006
Minister of Foreign Affairs	Eduard Kukan	SDKÚ	16 October 2002 – 4 July 2006
Minister of Education	Martin Fronc	KDH	16 October 2002 – 8 February 2006
Minister of Education	László Szigeti	SMK	8 February 2006 – 4 July 2006
Minister of Culture	Rudolf Chmel	ANO	16 October 2002 – 24 May 2005
Minister of Culture	František Tóth	ANO	24 May 2005 – 5 April 2006
Minister of Culture	Rudolf Chmel	ANO	5 April 2006 – 4 July 2006
Minister of Health	Rudolf Zajac	ANO	16 October 2002 – 4 July 2006
Minister of Construction	László Gyurovszky	SMK	16 October 2002 – 4 July 2006
Minister of the Environment	László Miklós	SMK	16 October 2002 – 4 July 2006

=== Deputy Prime Ministers ===
Minister	Political Party	In office	Notes
Pál Csáky	SMK	16 October 2002 – 4 July 2006	Deputy Prime Minister of European Affairs, Human Rights and Minorities
Ivan Mikloš	SDKÚ	16 October 2002 – 4 July 2006	
Daniel Lipšic	KDH	16 October 2002 – 8 February 2006	
Lucia Žitňanská	SDKÚ	8 February 2006 – 4 July 2006	Replaced Daniel Lipšic
Robert Nemcsics	ANO	16 October 2002 – 9 September 2003	
Pavol Rusko	ANO	23 September 2003 – 24 August 2005	Replaced Robert Nemcsics
Jirko Malchárek	Nonpartisan	4 October 2005 – 4 July 2006	Replaced Pavol Rusko

== Party composition ==
From the election until 7 February 2006 the following parties formed the government:

Party	Ideology	Leader	Deputies	Ministers
SDKÚ	Christian democracy	Mikuláš Dzurinda	28 / 150	6 / 18
SMK	Hungarian minority interests	Béla Bugár	20 / 150	4 / 18
KDH	Christian democracy	Pavol Hrušovský	15 / 150	3 / 18
ANO	Liberal populism	Pavol Rusko	15 / 150	5 / 18
Total			78 / 150	18

After the KDH left the government the governing parties were the following:

Party	Ideology	Leader	Deputies	Ministers
SDKÚ	Christian democracy	Mikuláš Dzurinda	23 / 150	8 / 18
SMK	Hungarian minority interests	Béla Bugár	20 / 150	5 / 18
ANO	Liberal populism	Pavol Rusko	10 / 150	5 / 18
Total			53 / 150	18
