= Peter Biroš =

Slovak politician (1950–2024)

Member of the National Council
- In office 15 October 2002 – 4 July 2006

Personal details
- Born: 8 April 1950 Prešov, Czechoslovakia
- Died: 19 July 2024 (aged 74)
- Party: Alliance of the New Citizen; Slovak Democratic and Christian Union – Democratic Party

Peter Biroš (8 April 1950 – 19 July 2024) was a Slovak politician and dental surgeon who served from 2002 to 2006 as a Member of the National Council of Slovakia.

== Biography ==
Peter Biroš was born on 8 April 1950 in Prešov. He studied dentistry at the Pavol Jozef Šafárik University, graduating in 1974. From 1997 to 1999 and again from 2002 to 2006 he was the director of the J.A. Reiman Hospital in Prešov. In addition to medical career, he was active as the sports director of the Tatran Prešov handball club.

Biroš served as a member of the Prešov municipal assembly from 1994 until his entry to national politics in 2002. He was among founding members of the Alliance of the New Citizen party on which election list he was elected in the 2002 Slovak parliamentary election. Following a corruption scandal of the party leader Pavol Rusko, Biroš left the party. Afterwards, he was a member of the Slovak Democratic and Christian Union but did not run for an elected office again.

== Personal life and death ==
His brother Pavol Biroš was a football defender, part of the Czechoslovak squad that won the UEFA Euro 1976.

Biroš died on 19 July 2024, at the age of 74.
