= Zuzana Martináková =

Slovak politician and journalist

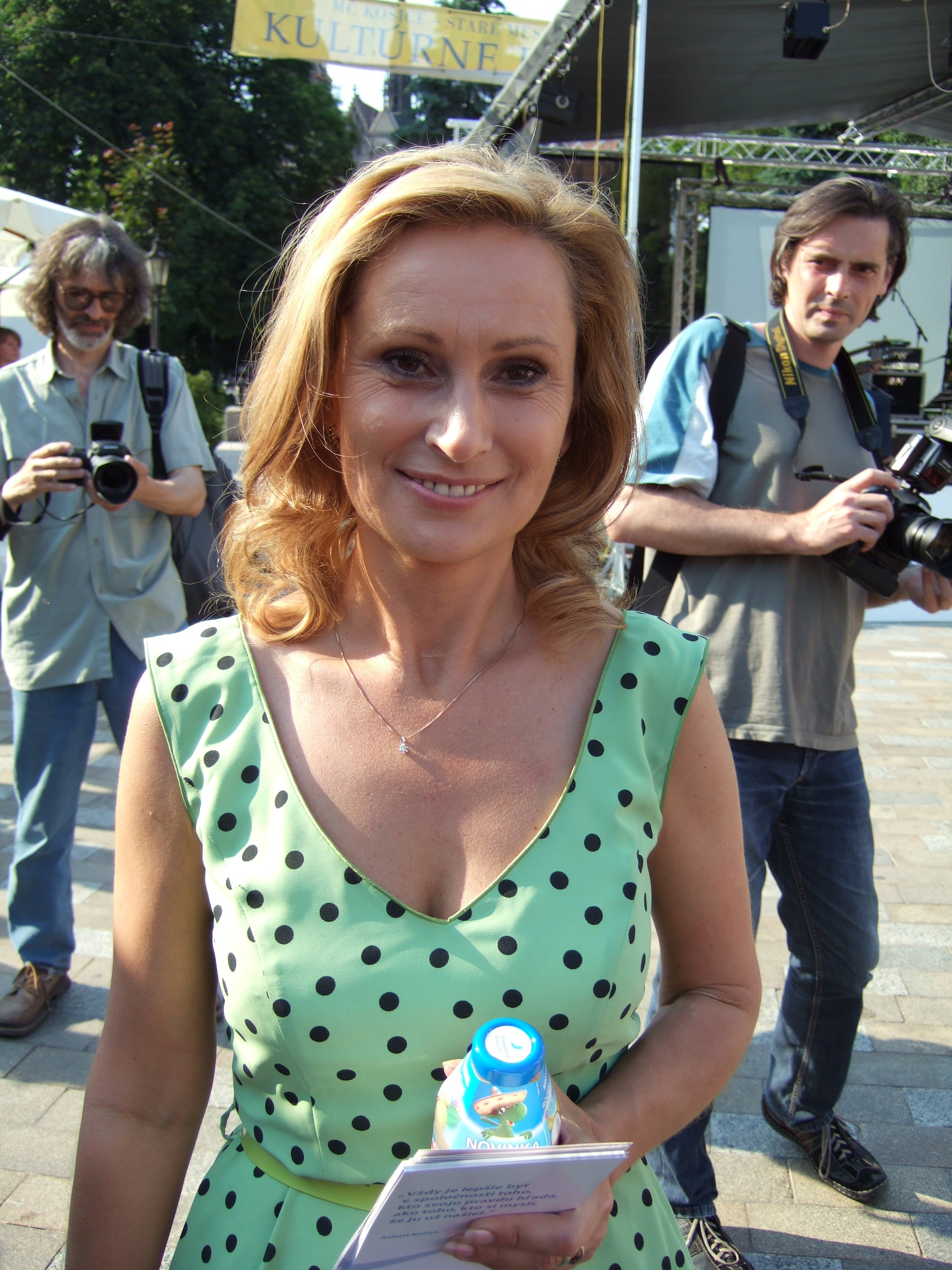

Member of the National Council of the Slovak Republic
- In office 15 October 2002 – 4 July 2006

Personal details
- Born: 5 May 1961 (age 64) Púchov, Czechoslovakia
- Party: Free Forum
- Spouse: Marián Bednár

Zuzana Martináková (born 5 May 1961 in Púchov, Czechoslovakia) is a Slovak politician and a former journalist. She is the leader of the political party Free Forum.

== Life ==
Martináková is a graduate of the Comenius University in Bratislava. She has worked for Slovak Radio (1988–1993) and for the BBC (1993–2001). She joined the Slovak Democratic and Christian Union (SDKÚ) and after Slovak parliamentary election in 2002 became the vice president of the National Council of the Slovak Republic. She was number five on the SDKU's list.

In January 2004, Martináková left the SDKÚ after frictions with Mikuláš Dzurinda, founded a new political party named Free Forum and was elected the party leader. In Slovak parliamentary election in 2006, the party did not join the Slovak Parliament (got only 3.47%; minimum 5% was required).

Zuzana Martináková is married (her husband Marián Bednár is a director of the Department of Communication of the Office of the President Ivan Gašparovič) and she is a mother of three sons – Michal, Juraj and Tomáš.
