= Liberalism in Slovakia =

This article is intended to give an overview of liberalism in Slovakia.

== History ==
=== During the Communist era ===
In 1944, the conservative Democratic Party was founded. In 1948, the Democratic Party was replaced by the pro-communist Party of Slovak Revival.

=== Late 20th century ===
In 1989, Hungarian liberals established the Independent Hungarian Initiative. In 1992, the party was renamed to the Hungarian Civic Party. In 1998, the party merged into the Hungarian Coalition Party.

Also in 1989, the Party of Slovak Revival renamed itself to Democratic Party. During the same year, Public Against Violence was formed. In 1991, Public Against Violence was renamed to Civic Democratic Union.

In 1993, dissidents from the Movement for a Democratic Slovakia established the Alliance of Democrats of the Slovak Republic, led by Milan Kňažko. In 1994, the party merged with another dissident group, the Alternative of Political Realism, into the Democratic Union of Slovakia (Demokratická Únia na Slovensku). In 1995, the Democratic Union of Slovakia merged with the National-Democratic Party into the Democratic Union.

=== 21st century ===
In 2001, liberals around Pavol Rusko established the Alliance of the New Citizen (ANO). In 2006, Hope split from ANO. In March 2009, liberals around the economist Richard Sulík established the Freedom and Solidarity party, which is the ideological successor of the Alliance of the New Citizen. In 2016–17, liberals founded Progressive Slovakia. In 2018, Together – Civic Democracy, led by former SDKÚ-DS member Miroslav Beblavý, split from the Slovak Conservative Party.

In 2018, widespread protests over the murder of Ján Kuciak were seen as a signal of a comeback for Slovak liberals. In the 2019 Slovak presidential election, Zuzana Čaputová's election as president was described by Foreign Policy as "[seeming] to confirm the ascendance of Slovak liberals that had started the previous year".

== See also ==
- History of Slovakia
- Politics of Slovakia
- List of political parties in Slovakia
