= Ľubomír Galko =

Slovak Minister of Defence and politician

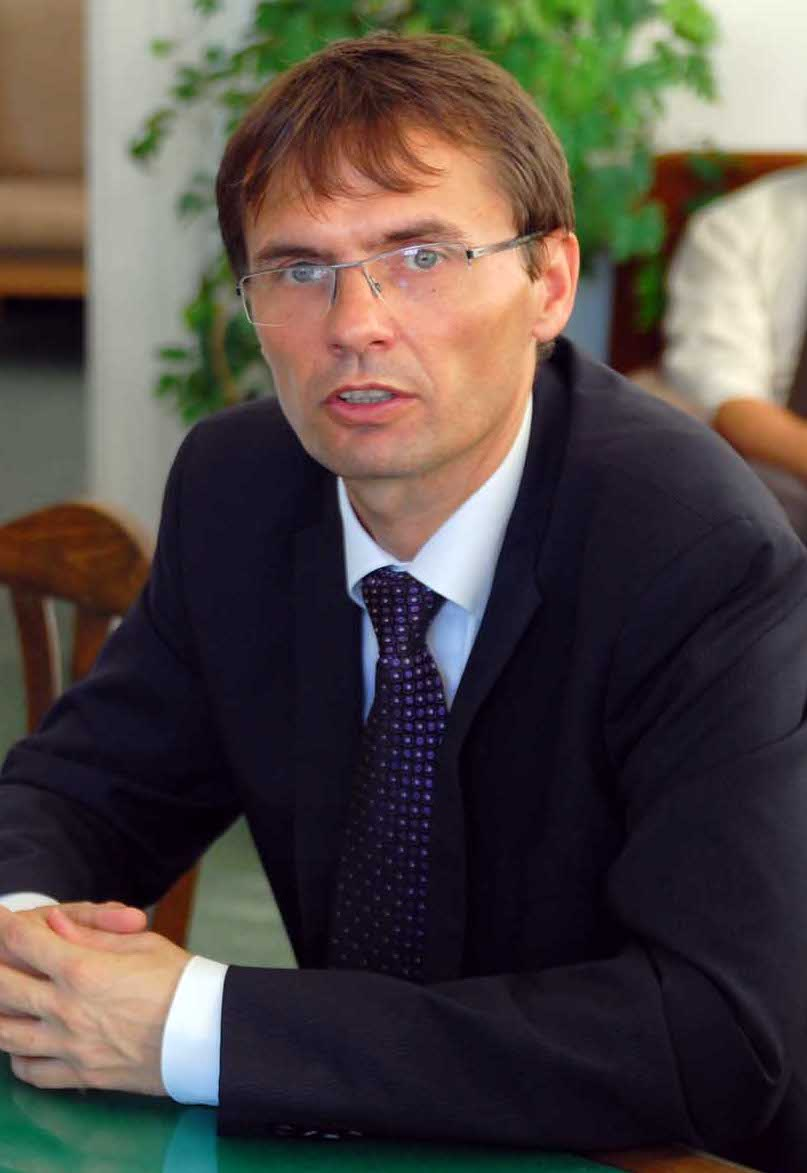
- Galko in 2011

Member of the National Council of Slovakia
- Incumbent
- Assumed office 25 October 2023
- In office 23 November 2011 – 20 March 2020

Minister of Defense, Slovakia
- In office 8 July 2010 – 23 November 2011
- President: Ivan Gašparovič
- Preceded by: Jaroslav Baška
- Succeeded by: Iveta Radičová

Personal details
- Born: 14 February 1968 (age 58) Klieština, Czechoslovakia
- Party: Party of the Democratic Left (1990–1999); SaS (2009–2019); Democratic Party (2019–2023); Ordinary People and Independent Personalities (2023–2024); Democrats (since 2024)
- Education: Comenius University in Bratislava

Ľubomír Galko (Note: Slovak pronunciation: [ˈʎubɔmiːr ˈɡalkɔ]) (born 14 February 1968) is a Slovakia politician. He has served as a Member of the National Council of Slovakia since 2023, having previously served as an MP from 2011 to 2020. Galko served as the Minister of Defence of Slovakia between 2010 and 2011.

== Early life ==
Galko was born on 14 February 1968 in the village of Klieština in Považská Bystrica District. He studied at the Mathematics and Physics Faculty of the Comenius University in Bratislava from 1986 to 1991. Galko lives in Stupava, a town near Bratislava.

== Political career ==
Galko was among the founders of the Freedom and Solidarity (SaS) party, being one of the first vice-chairmen of the party. However, after an intra-party struggle in 2019, resulting in Galko losing his position on the party leadership, he left SaS for the Democratic Party. Despite this, Galko's new party was not successful, winning only 0.14% of votes in the 2020 Slovak parliamentary election. Galko left the Democratic Party and joined OĽaNO in 2023, where he regained his parliamentary seat in the 2023 Slovak parliamentary election. He left OĽaNO to join Democrats in 2024, becoming its sole MP.
