= Ivan Šimko =

Slovak politician

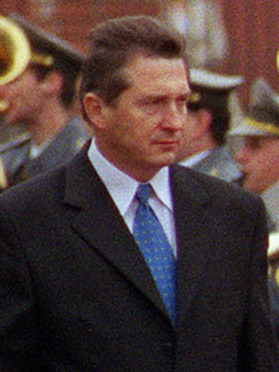
- Ivan Šimko in 2002

Minister of Interior
- In office 15 May 2023 – 19 July 2023
- Preceded by: Roman Mikulec
- Succeeded by: Ľudovít Ódor (acting)
- In office 15 May 2001 – 15 October 2002
- Preceded by: Ladislav Pittner
- Succeeded by: Vladimír Palko

Member of the National Council of the Slovak Republic Slovak National Council until 31 December 1992
- In office 24 September 2003 – 4 July 2006
- In office 13 December 1994 – 15 May 2001

Minister of Defence of Slovakia
- In office 15 October 2002 – 24 September 2003
- Preceded by: Jozef Stank
- Succeeded by: Juraj Liška

Personal details
- Born: 1 January 1955 (age 71) Bratislava, Czechoslovakia
- Party: Christian Democratic Movement
- Other political affiliations: KDH (1990–2000); SDKÚ-DS (2000–04); SF (2004); Misia 21 (2004–10); KDH (2010–present)
- Education: Comenius University

Ivan Šimko (born 1 January 1955) is Slovak politician and former defense and interior affairs minister.

A founding member of the Christian Democratic Movement (KDH) in 1990, Šimko left to co-found the Slovak Democratic and Christian Union in 2000. After a disagreement with Prime Minister Mikuláš Dzurinda, he led a group of MPs to form the Free Forum in January 2004. He surprisingly lost the party's leadership election two months later to Zuzana Martináková, and he left in October 2004 to form Mission 21 – New Christian Democracy. In May 2010, he returned to the Christian Democratic Movement.

On 15 May 2023, president Zuzana Čaputová installed Šimko as Minister of Interior Affairs in her technocratic government. On 19 July 2023, he was removed as a minister due to concerns about political interference in police work.
