= Free Forum =

Free Forum Slobodné fórum
- Leader: Zuzana Martináková
- Founded: 13 January 2004
- Dissolved: 6 July 2016
- Split from: Slovak Democratic and Christian Union – Democratic Party
- Headquarters: Bratislava
- Ideology: Liberalism
- Political position: Centre
- European affiliation: European Liberal Democrat and Reform Party (observer)
- European Parliament group: None
- International affiliation: None
- Colours: Blue, Yellow

Website
- http://www.slobodneforum.sk

The Free Forum (Slovak: Slobodné fórum,; "Free" in the sense of "freedom") was a political party in Slovakia, founded in 2004 by dissident parliamentarians from the Slovak Democratic and Christian Union (SDKÚ). Zuzana Martináková is the leader of the party.

The Free Forum was founded in January 2004 by Ivan Šimko and other Slovak Democratic and Christian Union MPs. Two months later, Zuzana Martináková was elected party leader, and Šimko left later that year. In the 2006 parliamentary election, the party won 3.47% of the vote: falling short of the 5% threshold to join the Slovak Parliament. In the 2010 parliamentary election, the party formed part of Union – Party for Slovakia, which won only 0.7% of the vote.

== History ==
- 13 January 2004 – Ivan Šimko and a group of MPs left the SDKÚ, after frictions with Mikuláš Dzurinda
- 27 March 2004 – Zuzana Martináková was elected the party leader
- October 2004 – Ivan Šimko left the party and founded a new political party named Mission 21 (Slovak: Misia 21)
- 17 April 2009 – became an observer member of the European Liberal Democrat and Reform Party (until 2011)
