= Pavol Frešo =

Slovak politician

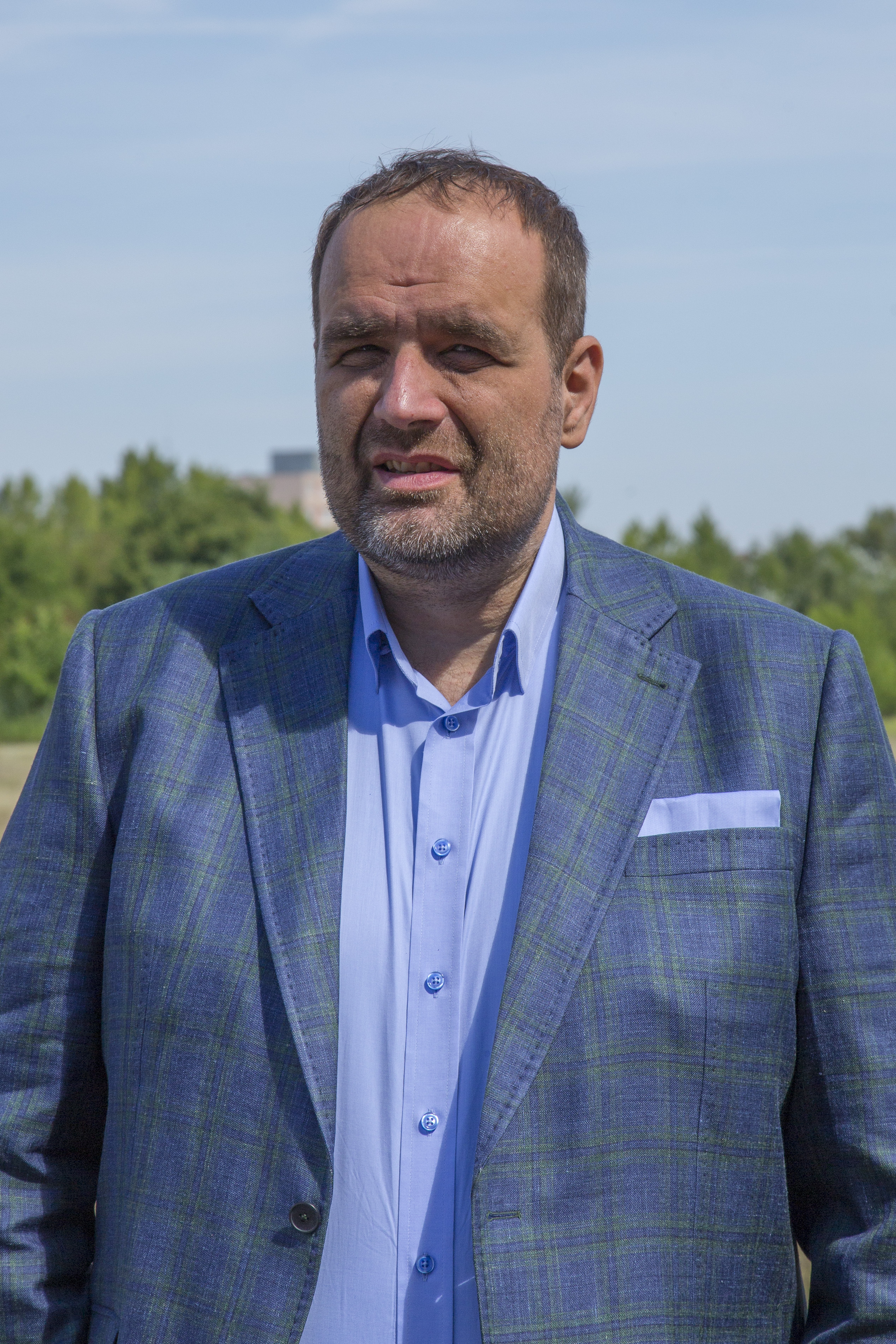

Governor of the Bratislava Region
- In office 2009–2017
- Preceded by: Vladimír Bajan
- Succeeded by: Juraj Droba

Member of the National Council of the Slovak Republic
- In office 2012–2016

Chairman of Slovak Democratic and Christian Union – Democratic Party
- In office 19 May 2012 – 2 July 2016
- Preceded by: Mikuláš Dzurinda
- Succeeded by: Party dissolved

Personal details
- Born: 21 April 1969 (age 57) Bratislava, Czechoslovakia (now Slovakia)
- Party: Slovak Democratic and Christian Union – Democratic Party
- Spouse: Zora Frešová
- Children: 3
- Education: University of Economics in Bratislava; Slovak Technical University

Pavol Frešo (born 21 April 1969) is a Slovak former politician who was the last chairman of SDKÚ-DS, Governor of the Bratislava Region, and an MP of the National Council of the Slovak Republic.

== Life ==
Frešo was born on 21 April 1969 in Bratislava. He studied at Slovak University of Technology in Bratislava graduated in 1992 and University of Economics in Bratislava earning a bachelor's degree (Bc.) in 1995. From 1990 until 1992 he worked as a self-employed person offering PC work lectures. From 1993 until 2006 he was president of company. He has not been active in business since 2006.

== Politics ==
- 1992–1993, vice-chairman of ODS, later renamed KDS
- 2003–2005, chairman of revision and check commission of SDKÚ-DS
- 2005–2006, vice-chairman for interior in DS
- 2006, member of presidium of SDKÚ-DS (after DS merged with SDKÚ)
- 17 June 2006 – elected member of National Council of the Slovak Republic for SDKÚ-DS
- 28 November 2009 – elected chairman of Bratislava Region
- 19 May 2012 – elected chairman of SDKÚ-DS
- 23 November 2013 – re-elected chairman of Bratislava Region

== Chairman of SDKÚ-DS ==
Frešo announced his candidacy on 18 April 2012, a month before elections. In election campaign Frešo blamed his rival Lucia Žitňanská for party's setback in last elections. Frešo was considered to be candidate of regions, while Žitňanská had strong position in Bratislava. The third candidate Viliam Novotný announced candidacy shortly before election. Frešo won in the first round, but his 178 votes were insufficient for victory, so a second round took place. Two candidates advanced in second round, Frešo won distinctly with 242 votes against 142 votes for Žitňanská.
