= Iveta Radičová =

Slovak politician and sociologist, former prime minister

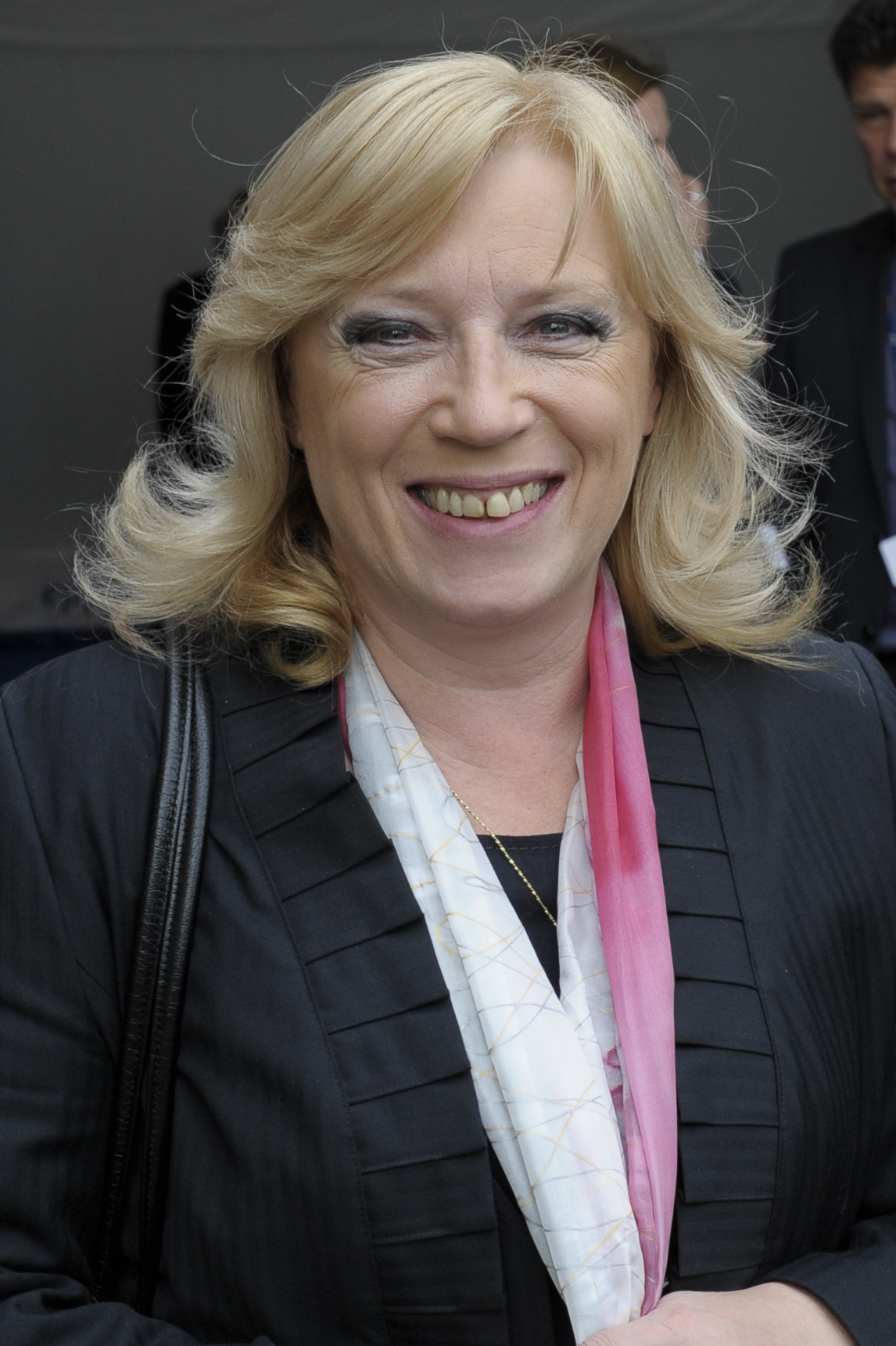
- Radičová in 2010

Prime Minister of Slovakia
- In office 8 July 2010 – 4 April 2012
- President: Ivan Gašparovič
- Preceded by: Robert Fico
- Succeeded by: Robert Fico

Minister of Defence
- Acting; 28 November 2011 – 4 April 2012
- Prime Minister: Herself
- Preceded by: Ľubomír Galko
- Succeeded by: Martin Glváč

Minister of Labour
- In office 17 October 2005 – 4 July 2006
- Prime Minister: Mikuláš Dzurinda
- Preceded by: Ľudovít Kaník
- Succeeded by: Viera Tomanová

Member of the National Council
- In office 4 July 2006 – 23 April 2009

Personal details
- Born: Iveta Karafiátová; 7 December 1956 (age 69) Bratislava, Czechoslovakia
- Party: Democratic and Christian Union-Democratic Party (2006–2012)
- Spouse(s): Stano Radič (Deceased 2005); Marián Balázs
- Education: Comenius University; Slovak Academy of Sciences

Iveta Radičová (Note: Slovak pronunciation: [ˈiʋeta ˈraɟitʂɔʋaː]) (née Karafiátová; born 7 December 1956) is a Slovak sociologist and former politician who served as prime minister of Slovakia from 2010 to 2012. The first woman to hold the position, Radičová led a coalition government as a member of the SDKÚ-DS. As prime minister, she was responsible for managing the economy after the Great Recession, and she supported budget cuts to reduce the government deficit.

Born in communist Czechoslovakia, Radičová began an academic career as a sociologist and specialized in methodology so she did not have to participate in ideological projects. She was one of the few women to take a prominent role in the Velvet Revolution, serving as a spokeswoman for Public Against Violence. She founded the Social Policy Analysis Center in 1992. During the 1990s, she opposed the dissolution of Czechoslovakia and the rule of Vladimír Mečiar. In 2005, she was appointed Minister of Labor, Social Affairs, and Family. Radičová was elected a member of parliament in 2006, and she was the runner-up in the 2009 presidential election. She was forced to resign from parliament in 2009 when she cast a vote on behalf of a colleague. In 2010, Radičová's party formed a coalition, making her prime minister. Her coalition collapsed in 2011 when she tied the European Financial Stability Facility to confidence in her government. After stepping down, Radičová returned to academia.

== Early life ==
=== Childhood and education ===
Iveta Karafiátová was born in Bratislava, Czechoslovakia, on 7 December 1956. She has said that her father was strict, while she compared her mother to an angel. Karafiátová grew up in poverty, which she attributed to the country's communist governance and her father's inability to succeed under it. When her father took her to enroll in school, the headmaster had her skip kindergarten after learning that she could read. She practiced dance throughout her childhood, quitting when she was sixteen. She was not permitted to graduate from secondary school, as she and her class had decided to reject the required socialist theme of their class project. Despite this, she was still accepted into university.

Karafiátová attended Comenius University from 1975 to 1979, where she studied sociology. She took up the subject on the advice of Tón Hirner, a family friend and the brother of sociologist Alexander Hirner. Her intention was to pursue a sociology and mathematics hybrid degree, but the program was canceled because she was the only applicant. When she began attending the school, she met Stano Radič. They married in 1979, and they had a daughter, Eva, in 1980. After obtaining her bachelor's degree, Iveta Radičová attended the Slovak Academy of Sciences, where she earned her PhD in the same subject.

=== Academic career and activism ===
Radičová began working as the head of the Slovak Academy of Sciences' family research team in 1979, where she studied how communist states such as Slovakia could implement family policy. Unlike most academics in her field, she did not join the Communist Party of Slovakia or study Marxism–Leninism. Instead, she specialized in methodology, a field which demanded less ideological adherence. Even then, she was relatively open about her anti-communist beliefs.

As the Velvet Revolution was beginning in 1989, Radičová involved herself with the Public Against Violence movement, becoming its spokeswoman. In this capacity, she was one of the few women was prominently involved with the Velvet Revolution. The same year, Radičová left the Slovak Academy of Sciences and spent the following year at the University of Oxford working with Ralf Dahrendorf. Radičová returned to Slovakia in 1990, where she began teaching sociology and political science at Comenius University. She also founded the Social Policy Analysis Center, where she served as the director from 1992 to 2005. She came to specialize in the study of gender issues, both at Comenius and at the Social Policy Analysis Center. She also became the head of the board for Open Society Foundations' Slovak branch. She later left Public Against Violence to become the spokeswoman for the right-wing Civic Democratic Party, though she had no formal position within the party.

Radičová opposed the dissolution of Czechoslovakia in 1993, and she supported liberal democracy during the semi-authoritarian rule of Vladimír Mečiar. In the 1998–1999 school year, she was at New York University as a visiting fellow through the Fulbright Program. She was made a full professor in 2005, making her the first woman in Slovakia to be a professor of sociology. Later that year, she was made head of the Slovak Academy of Sciences' Sociology Institute. Radičová's husband died of a heart attack in 2005.

== Political career ==
=== Entering Parliament ===
Mikuláš Dzurinda succeeded Mečiar as prime minister in 1998 as part of a democratic coalition government, and he appointed Radičová as Minister of Labor, Social Affairs, and Family in 2005. Though she was not an elected politician, she was chosen as she had expertise in the area. She had difficulty adjusting to and working with her colleagues: she did not make strong allies among her peers in minister positions or her subordinates within her own ministry.

Radičová left her position the following year, when she ran in the 2006 parliamentary election to serve in the National Council. She was elected as a nonpartisan candidate affiliated with a centre-right political party, the Slovak Democratic and Christian Union – Democratic Party (SDKÚ-DS), and she formally joined the party that November. Radičová was then chosen as the party's deputy chair. During her term, she also served as the deputy chair of the Committee of Social Affairs and Housing. Here she specialized in issues relating to families and welfare. As the SDKÚ-DS was an opposition party, she was restricted in her ability to pass legislation. Also in 2006, she began a romantic relationship with Paralympic athlete Ján Riapoš, which lasted for three years.

=== 2009 presidential campaign ===
Radičová was the opposition candidate in the 2009 presidential election. Officially running with the SDKÚ-DS, she was also endorsed by the Christian Democratic Movement, the Party of the Hungarian Coalition, and the Civic Conservative Party. She had to convince the Christian Democratic Movement to support her through negotiations, as they disapproved of her relatively liberal positions on family and gender. She agreed to make a statement of neutrality on the subject in exchange for their support. She also made a point to speak out against abortion—voters believed her to be more sympathetic to abortion as she was a woman, and this issue made up most of the gender-related discussion during the election. Though Radičová had previously said that her being a woman may harm her in a presidential election, she paid little attention to the subject publicly while she campaigned.

Seeking to contrast herself with her opponents, Radičová maintained a policy of civility, speaking calmly and refusing to engage in personal attacks. Her critics said that her lack of aggressiveness represented an inability to fight for the interests of the country, and her prior opposition to the dissolution of Czechoslovakia was portrayed as a loyalty to non-Slovaks. Voters feared that she was more closely aligned with the nation's significant Hungarian minority and that she may grant them autonomy. In this way, the support of the Party of the Hungarian Coalition was damaging to her approval outside of the Hungarian-populated southern Slovakia.

Radičová received 38.1% of the vote, the second most overall, allowing her to proceed to the second round against the candidate who earned the most votes: incumbent president Ivan Gašparovič. She lost the runoff election, receiving only 44.5% of the vote compared to Gasparovic's 55.5%.

=== Resignation and reelection ===
After the presidential election, Radičová became the subject of a political scandal. On 21 April 2010, when her fellow legislator Tatiana Rosová was absent from the parliament building, Radičová cast a vote on her behalf against parliamentary rules. Radičová resigned from her seat two days later. She retained her position as SDKÚ-DS's deputy leader, and she defeated Ivan Mikloš in a content for the top spot on the party's candidate list for the 2010 parliamentary election. Though the SDKÚ-DS did not win a plurality of the vote, Prime Minister Robert Fico of the Direction – Social Democracy party was unable to form a coalition. SDKÚ-DS was then able to form a coalition, and Radičová became its leader as Prime Minister of Slovakia.

== Prime Minister of Slovakia ==
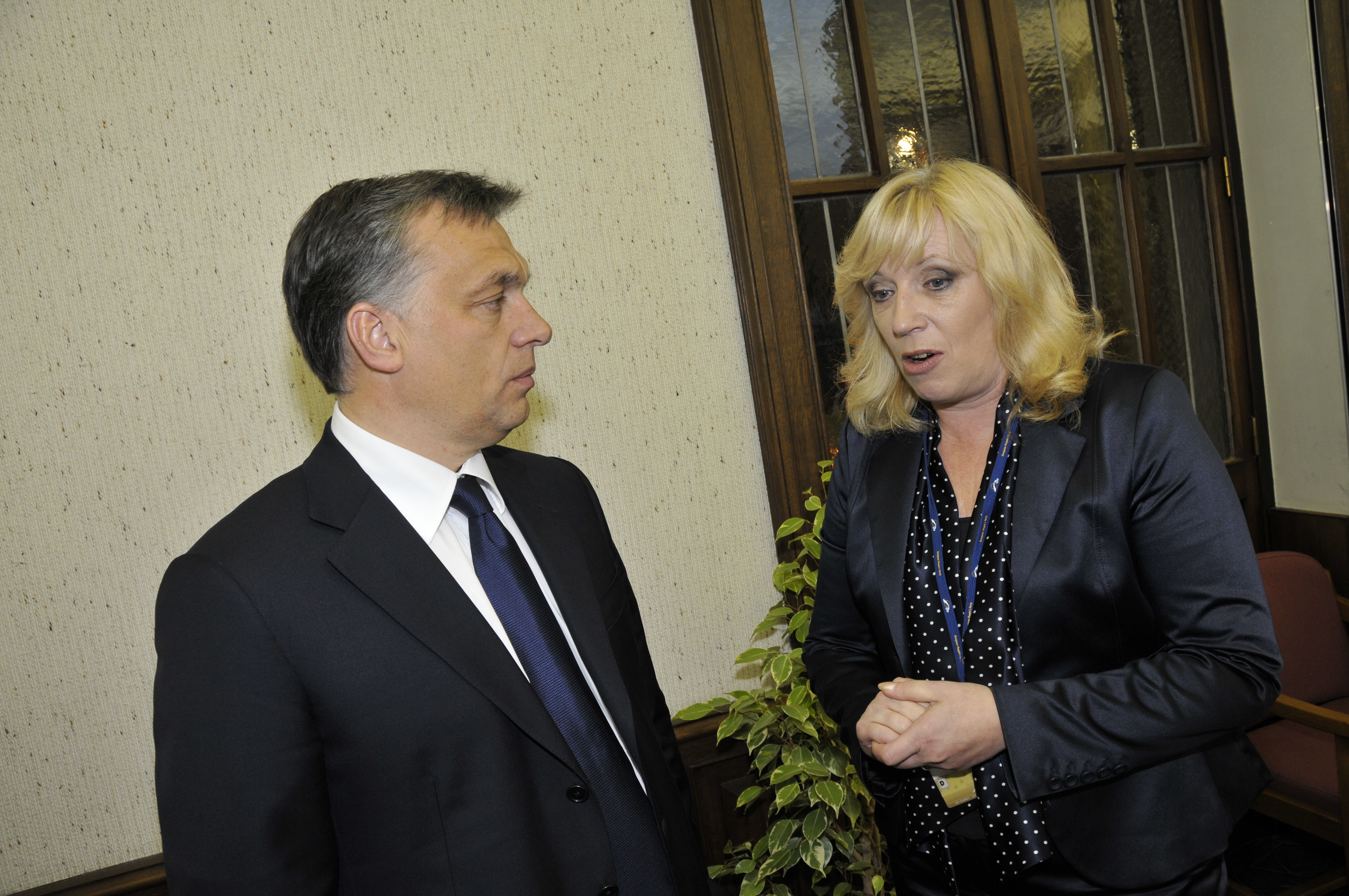
Radičová with Prime Minister of Hungary Viktor Orbán, at an EPP summit in September 2010

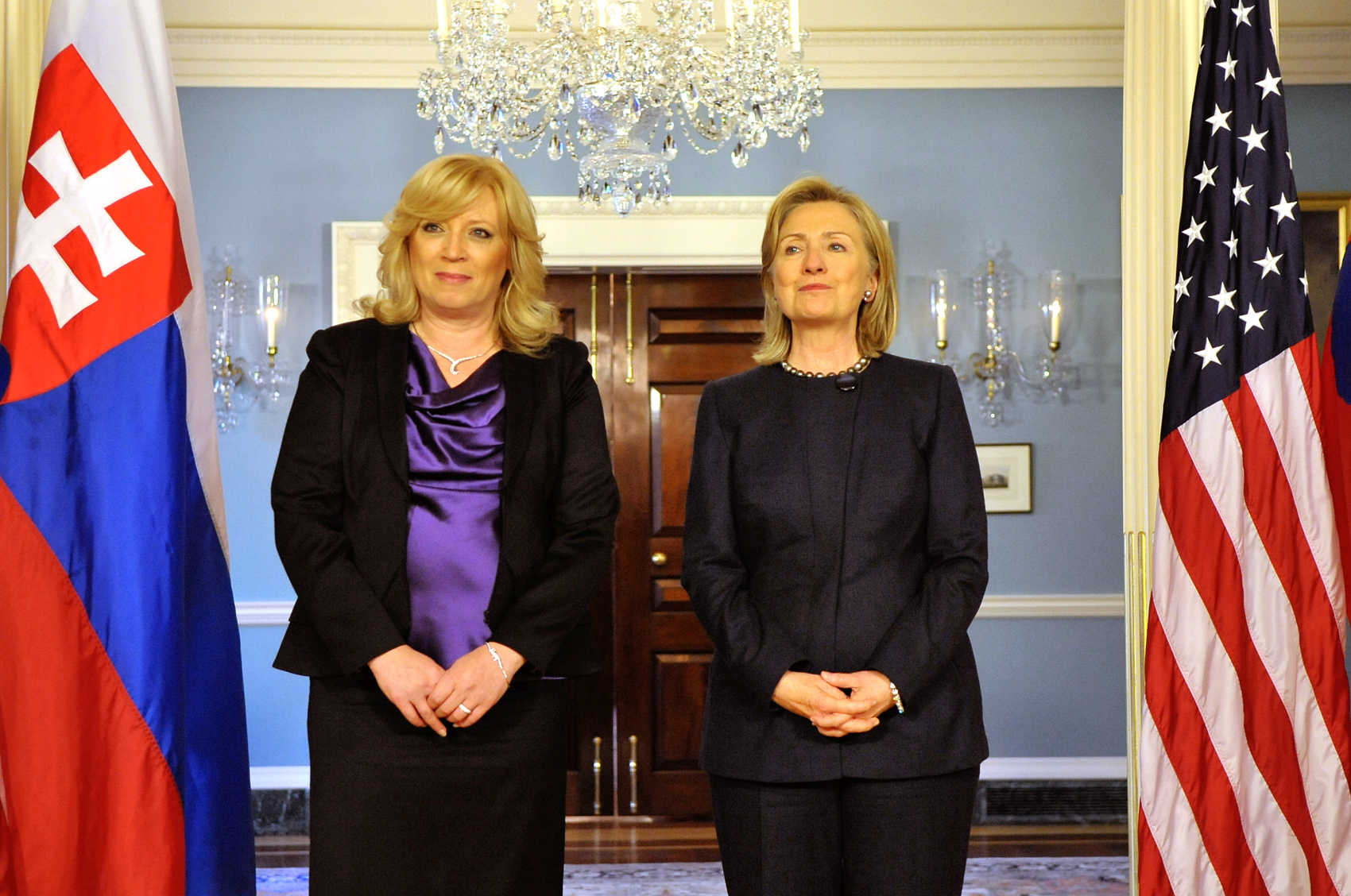
Radičová meets with U.S. Secretary of State Hillary Clinton in Washington, D.C., in November 2010

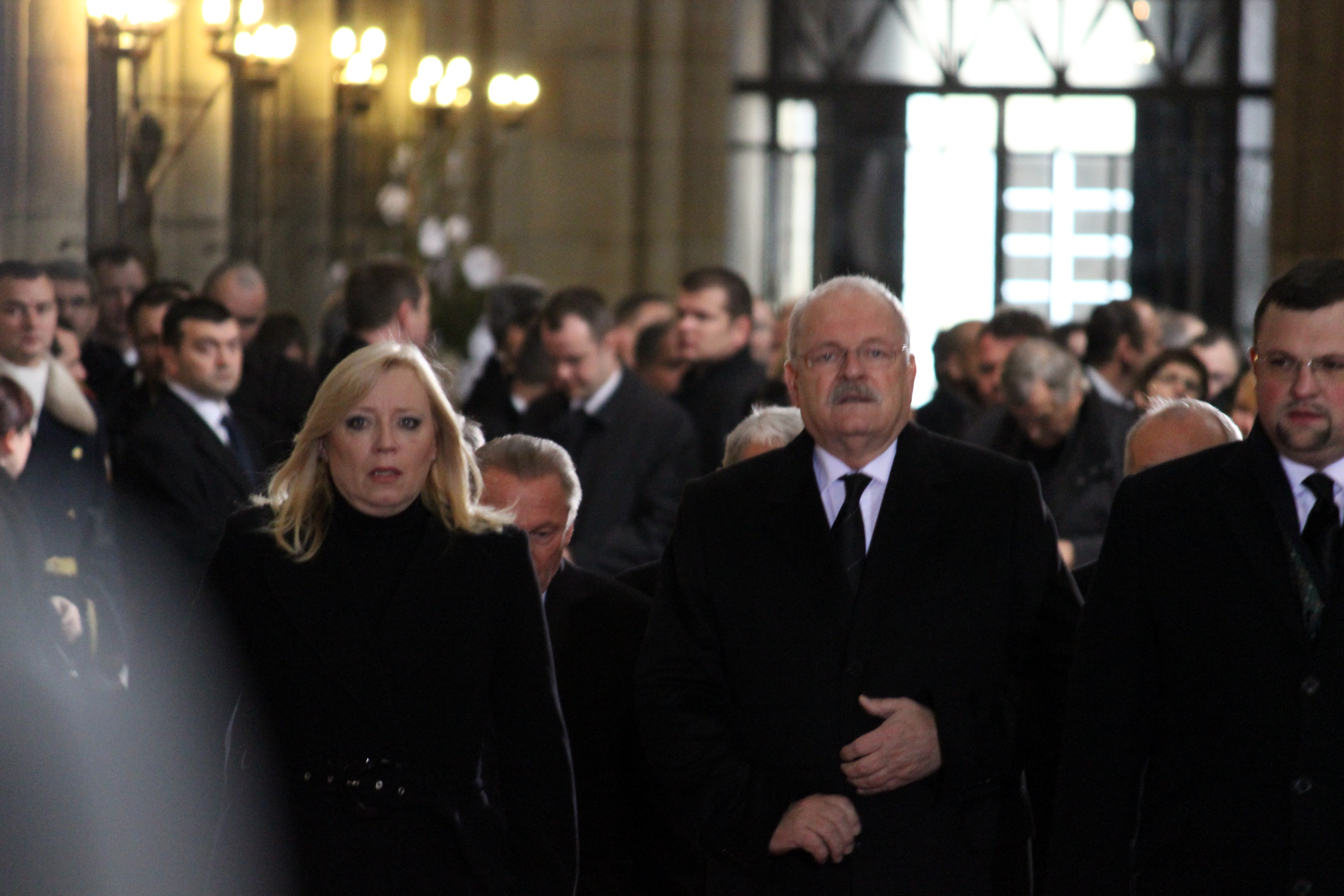
Radičová with President Gašparovič at the funeral of Václav Havel in 2011

In addition to her own SDKÚ-DS, Radičová's coalition government included the Christian Democratic Movement, Freedom and Solidarity, and a new inter-ethnic party, Most–Híd. The circumstances of her premiership led her to be known as an "accidental prime minister".

Radičová's position as prime minister was fragile. Her relationships with major party figures in her government, including Dzurinda as the Minister of Finance and Mikloš as the Minister of Foreign Affairs, declined and eventually became oppositional in nature. The coalition that she formed was also unreliable, as the parties did not necessarily agree on major issues. Further troubles were caused by the corruption scandals that required her to replace several of her appointments. When the minister of defence resigned from his office in such a scandal in November 2011, Radičová took a second role as acting minister of defence.

In 2011, Radičová's coalition fell apart when presented with a vote on the European Financial Stability Facility. When the Freedom and Solidarity Party joined the opposition, Radičová insisted that an oppose vote was equivalent to a motion of no confidence in the government. This did not convince them to reconsider, and her government ended. Radičová and the rest of SDKÚ-DS released a statement afterward defending the decision, arguing that integration with Europe was more important than the existing government.

=== Policies ===
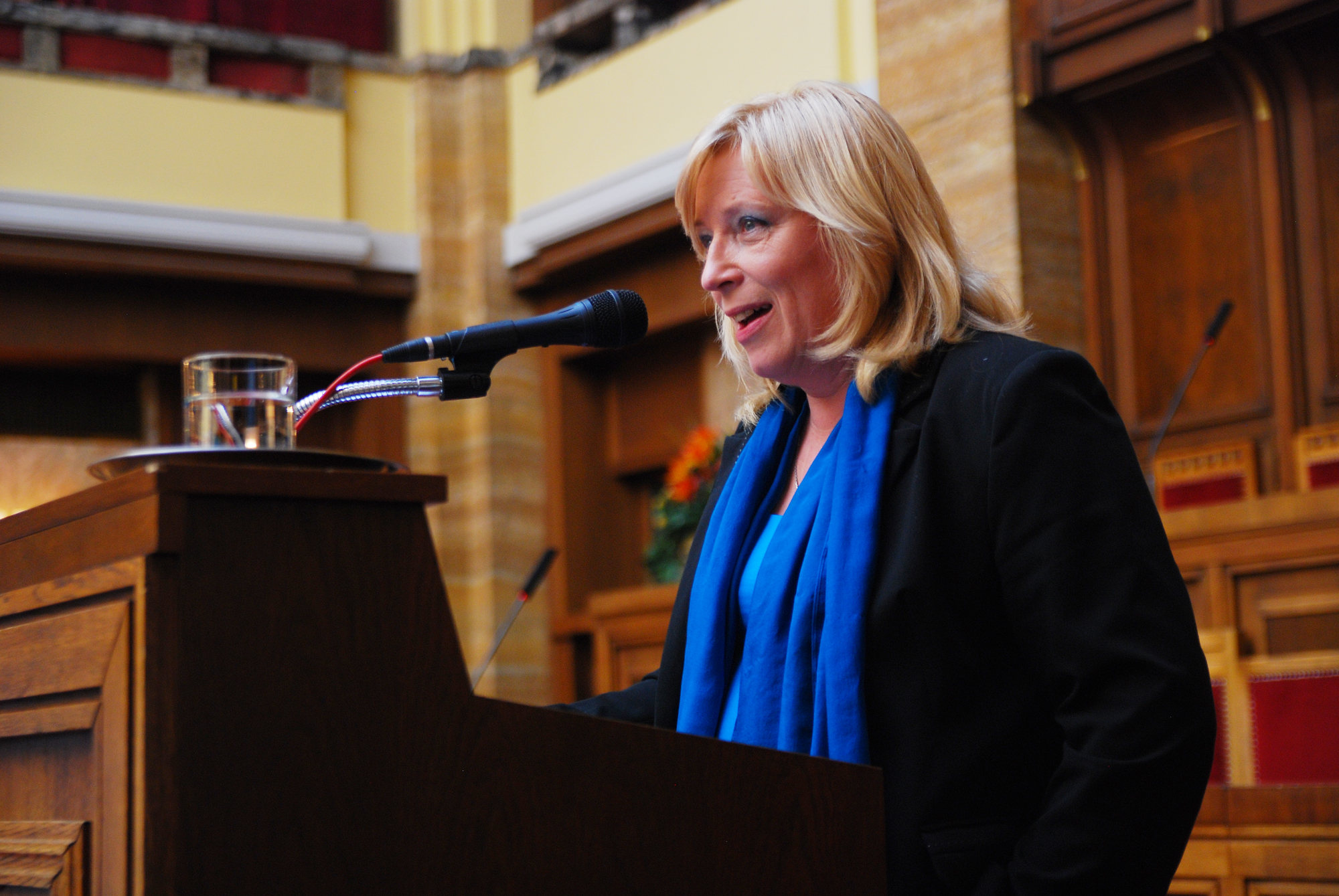
Radičová speaking in 2011

The economy was a major issue during Radičová's tenure, as she became prime minister at the end of the Great Recession and was responsible for the nation's recovery. Slovakia was not as well established financially as other European nations, suffering from a large deficit, high unemployment, significant debt, low average income, poor standard of living, and insufficient infrastructure. Radičová saw a 0.8pp decrease in unemployment during her government.

Radičová pledged that her new government would cut state spending to reduce the budget deficit, while steering clear of tax rises. She stated, "We are ready to take responsibility over the country at a time when it is coping with the impact of a deep economic crisis and the irresponsible decisions of our political predecessors." She also said that Slovakia's guarantee of 4.5 billion euros to the EU stabilization fund was exorbitant, but she also stated that she will not block approval of the scheme within the EU, though she sought to renegotiate her country's contribution to it. She also worked to improve relations with Hungary, which had been strained by laws that negatively affected Slovakia's Hungarian population.

Radičová enacted efforts to reduce government corruption, establishing an open government initiative. To promote transparency, she required that all public procurement contracts be made available online. Her own government saw several corruption scandals during her tenure. Among the largest was the Gorilla scandal, in which it was discovered that SDKÚ-DS leadership and other officials were engaging in elicit meetings with businesses. This caused a loss of faith in her government and harmed the party in the 2012 parliamentary election.

By the end of her government, Radičová was unable to see most of her policy objectives enacted, largely because of the short period of time that she was prime minister. She also cited the Great Recession as a complication, saying that it caused unrest and made governance more difficult across the European Union.

== Post-premiership ==
Radičová was succeeded by her predecessor, Robert Fico. After leaving politics, Radičová returned to Comenius University, where she continued teaching. She renounced her membership with SDKÚ-DS, including her position as deputy party leader, on 3 May 2012. Radičová was chosen as Dean of the Faculty of Mass Media at the Pan-European University in 2017. In 2013, Radičová published Krajina hrubých čiar [Country of Full Stops], a book on her experience as prime minister. In a 2014 poll by Polis Slovakia, 23.2% of respondents named Radičová as one of the best recent politicians in the country, putting her second only to Robert Fico, while her name did not appear on the list of twelve least valuable politicians. Radičová was honored with a Women Political Leaders award in 2017. A 2018 poll by Focus found that she was the most popular choice for President of Slovakia, with 13.9%.

Radičová began a relationship with Marián Balázs, the former head of her advisory team, in 2012.

Political offices
Preceded by Robert Fico	Prime Minister of Slovakia; 2010–2012	Succeeded by Robert Fico
