= Pavol Rusko =

Slovak politician and television magnate (born 1963)

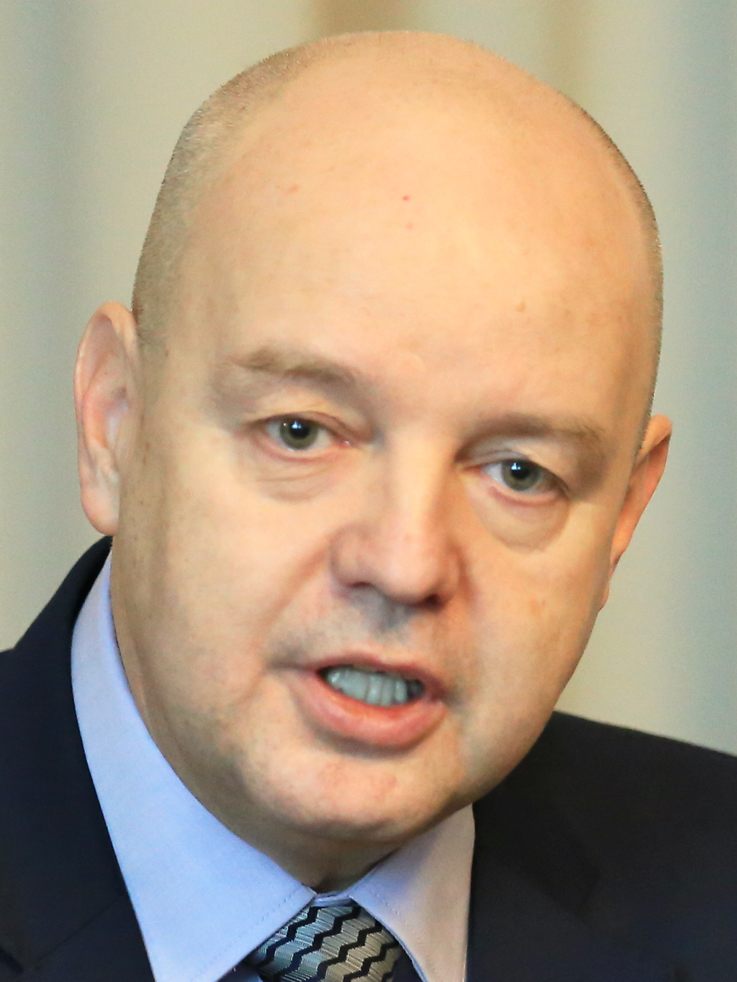

Minister of Economy of Slovakia
- In office September 24, 2003 – August 24, 2005
- Preceded by: Robert Nemcsics, until September 10, 2003; Pavol Prokopovič, (acting, September 10 - September 24)
- Succeeded by: Jirko Malchárek, since October 4, 2005; Ivan Mikloš (acting, August 24 - October 4)

Personal details
- Born: August 20, 1963 (age 63) Liptovský Hrádok, Czechoslovakia (present day Slovakia)
- Party: Alliance of the New Citizen,
- Spouses: Viera Rusková (m. 1991; div. 2011) Henriett Heger (m. 2019; div. 2022)
- Children: 2

Pavol Rusko (born 20 August 1963) is retired Slovak politician, television magnate and convicted fraudster. He served as the Minister of Economy of Slovakia between 2003 and 2005 and Managing Director of TV Markíza, at the time Slovakia's most viewed private TV station, between 1996 and 2000. He currently serves a 19-year prison sentence for forging promissory notes in a conspiracy to defraud TV Markíza.

== Early life ==
Pavol Rusko was born in Liptovský Hrádok on 20 August 1963. He studied Journalism at the Comenius University, graduating in 1987. Already as a student, he worked as Sports anchor at the Slovak public TV broadcaster and was active in the Czechoslovak Socialist Youth Union. In 1994 he left journalism to become a businessman, co-founding and since 1995 acting as the CEO of TV Markíza.

== CEO of Markíza ==
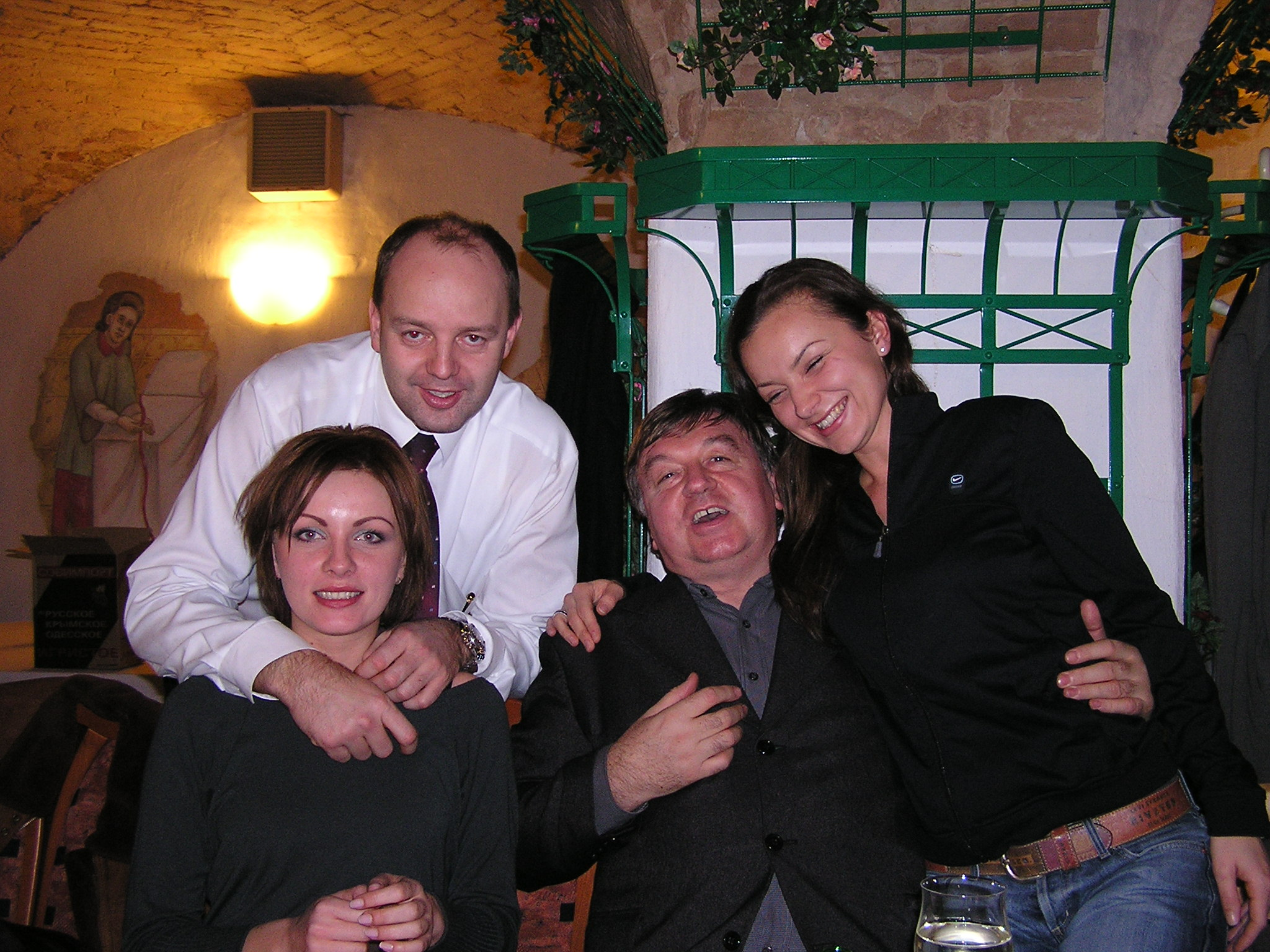
Pavol Rusko attending a party at TV Markíza as its CEO

In the mid 1990s, Rusko planned to start the first private television broadcaster in Slovakia. The starting capital was provided by a Slovak entrepreneur living in Germany Silvia Volzová an American-owned media conglomerate [Central European Media Enterprises]. TV Markíza started broadcasting on 31 August 1996, quickly gaining massive viewership. From the beginning, Markíza was critical of the government of Slovakia's autocratic prime minister Vladimír Mečiar, despite the amicable personal relationship between Mečiar and Rusko.

In the late summer 1998, the private security hired by Rusko's former university classmate Marián Kočner and his business partner Štefan Agh, supported by Volzová who had grown hostile to Rusko's conduct, took control of TV Markíza premises, claiming Kočner's company Gamatex was entitled to take over the broadcaster due to an unpaid debt by Rusko. Markíza's own security personnel along with station's employees attempted to resist the hostile takeover but were powerless against described by Rusko's Deputy Pavlík as "the most ruthless thugs in the underworld".

The takeover of Markíza caused popular uproar, being perceived by the public as an attempt to silence the popular opposition-supporting broadcaster. Thousands of people attended spontaneous rallies protesting the takeover nearby TV Markíza's premises as well as in other cities around Slovakia. The rallies were supported by many popular artists as well as opposition politicians, including future prime ministers Mikuláš Dzurinda and Robert Fico. The crisis ended when Kočner agreed to end his occupation of Markíza and settle the matter in court. The conflict between Kočner and Rusko lasted until 2000, when Markíza paid off Kočner.

Rusko remained the CEO of Markíza until 2000. Even though he was no longer the CEO, Rusko likely retained a degree of control over Markíza, which strongly supported his new political project Alliance of the New Citizen (ANO). The extent of the support was such, that Markíza got repeatedly fined by the regulator for failing to objectively inform about political developments and even its broadcasting license got in danger. This situation lasted until 2005, when [Central European Media Enterprises] paid off Rusko and took over almost all outstanding shares of TV Markíza.

== Political career ==
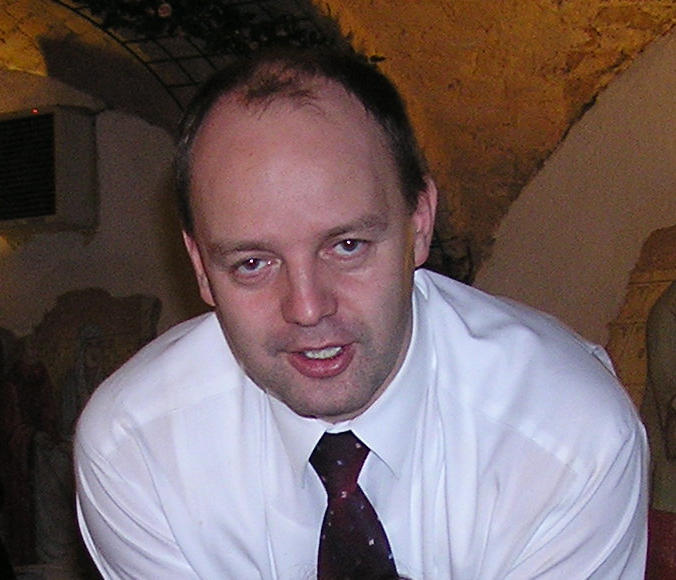
Pavol Rusko as a minister in 2003

Rusko got elected to the National Council in 2002, on the top of the ANO party election list, which received 8% in the 2002 Slovak parliamentary election. After the election, he served as a deputy speaker of parliament. In 2003, he became the Minister of Economy. In 2005 he was fired by the prime minister Mikuláš Dzurinda, after it became public knowledge that Rusko borrowed a substantial sum of money from a controversial businessman.

Following his sacking, Rusko returned to the parliament. In response to the sacking, Rusko attempted to take his party out of the governing coalition, however a majority of ANO's MPs rebelled against his leadership and continued supporting the government. Rusko attributed the rebellion to bribery of the individual MPs, releasing multiple secret recordings of them admitting receiving bribes in a private conversation with Rusko. The allegations of bribery of MPs nonetheless did not result in a collapse of the government, which stayed in power for another year.

Rusko served as an MP until 2006, when ANO failed to pass the 5% representation threshold in the 2006 Slovak parliamentary election. In 2007 he resigned as the chairman of ANO and retired from politics.

== Promissory notes scandal and sentencing ==
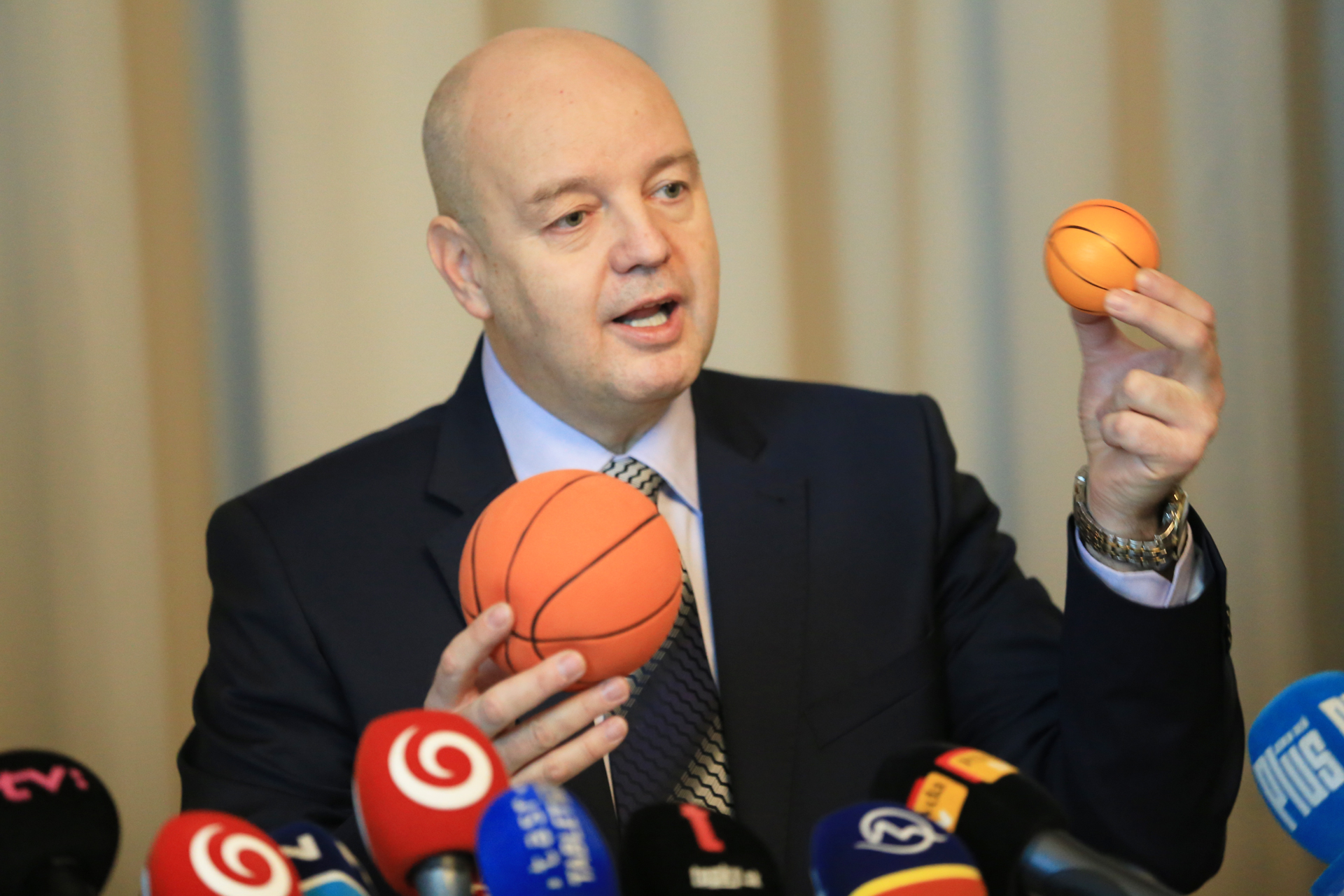
Rusko explaining his version of the promissory notes scandals using small balls at a press conference in 2018

After leaving politics, Rusko maintained low profile and largely stayed out of the news. In 2018, he surprised the public by announcing that the actual way how he settled the dispute with Marián Kočner over the debt back in 2000 was by issuing promissory notes in the total value of 70 million EUR. Rusko claimed that he issued the promissory notes as a private individual but since he was the CEO of TV Markíza, the broadcaster was responsible for paying the debt as Rusko had previously lost all his property. On the basis of this promisory note, Kočner demanded millions of euros of payments from TV Markíza. His claimed was initially backed by a local court.

In response to the lawsuit, TV Markíza filled a counter-suit, alleging Kočner and Rusko conspired to defraud the company by forging and backdating the promissory note. The broadcaster argued that there was no mention of the promissory notes in the accounting of the company and Rusko himself had never previously mentioned their existence. Rusko denied the claim, insisting the promissory notes were genuine and TV Markíza accounting was lacking also other important documents.

On 27 February 2020, the court sentenced Kočner and Rusko to 19 years in prison for falsifying the promissory notes and attempting to fraudulently extort millions from TV Markíza. The sentencing was confirmed by the appellate court on 12 January 2021.

== Other criminal allegations ==
=== Plot to murder Silvia Volzová ===
Mikuláš Černák, a former Mafia boss serving life sentence since 2007, accused Rusko of ordering a murder of TV Markíza's co-owner Silvia Volzová. Černák made the accusation in 2019, claiming that he met Rusko secretly in 1997 in Banská Bystrica and accepted the task to kidnap Volzová, force her to turn her equity in TV Markíza over to Rusko and then murder her. Rusko admitted to the meeting but claimed he went there only to find out if anybody had order his own killing and not to order a murder. The court case is still ongoing, Černák made a sworn testimony that he had Volzová followed and was preparing to kidnap and murder her, but he was unable to finish the deed because he was taken into custody for other killings. Černák also made an emotional apology at the court to Volzová for accepting the task. As of 2022 the court case is still ongoing.

=== The Beacon of Hope scandal ===
The Beacon of Hope was a common project between the Foundation of TV Markíza and Bratislava Old Town district. The Foundation ran a shelter for abused women and their children in a house that the district sold it for a symbolic amount. In spite of the provision that prevented the Foundation from selling the house, Rusko attempted to exchange it for another property with Marian Kočner when he became the head of the Foundation in 2015. The district eventually managed to stop the transaction and regain ownership of the house, although the Beacon of Hope ceased functioning in the meantime and the inhabitants had to leave the shelter. Rusko is accused of defrauding the district. On 23 November 2023 Rusko was found guilty of defrauding the foundation but the judge did not sentence him to any additional punishment, deeming the 19 years jail term for forging promissory notes sufficient.

== Personal life ==
Rusko married his collage sweetheart Viera in 1991. The wedding was attended by the future prime minister Vladimír Mečiar. From this marriage, Rusko has two children, daughter Lívia and son Pavol. In 2011, Rusko divorced his wife due to his new relationship with a modeling agent Henriett Heger. Rusko married Heger 2019, shortly before the start of his prison term. Heger applied for divorce in 2022.

In 2005, he was hospitalized due to a leg injury, which was originally attributed to Rusko accidentally shooting himself in the leg during a hunting trip. In his 2019 book, Rusko eventually admitted he had deliberately caused the injury to avoid having to testify in a criminal case.
