= László Szigeti =

Slovak politician (1957–2022)

Minister of Education
- In office 9 February 2006 – 4 July 2006
- Preceded by: Martin Fronc
- Succeeded by: Ján Mikolaj

Personal details
- Born: 3 August 1957 Búč, Czechoslovakia
- Died: 2 February 2022 (aged 64)
- Party: SMK-MKP
- Education: Comenius University

László Szigeti (3 August 1957 – 2 February 2022) was a Slovak politician. A member of the Party of the Hungarian Community, he served as Minister of Education from 9 February to 4 July 2006. He died on 2 February 2022, at the age of 64.
