= Jirko Malchárek =

Slovak politician (born 1966)

Minister of Economy of Slovakia
- In office 4 October 2005 – 4 July 2006
- Preceded by: Pavol Rusko, until 24 August 2005, Ivan Mikloš (acting, 24 August – 4 October)
- Succeeded by: Ľubomír Jahnátek

Personal details
- Born: 28 June 1966 (age 60) Jeseník, Czechoslovakia
- Party: Nádej; Alliance of the New Citizen (2002–2005); Party of Civic Understanding (1998–2002)

Jirko Malchárek (born 28 June 1966 in Jeseník) is a former Minister of Economy of Slovakia, former deputy prime minister of Slovakia and former racing driver.

== Life and career ==
Malchárek was educated in technical field and graduated at the Slovak University of Technology in Bratislava.

He was in the Slovak National Council from 1998 to 2006, initially for the Party of Civic Understanding (Strana občianskeho porozumenia) and from 2002 as a member of the Alliance of the New Citizen, of which he is a founding member. In September 2005 he abandoned Alliance of the New Citizen and became a member of Nádej (English: Hope), which did not get into parliament in the 2006 elections.

He is interested in automobile racing and raced for 11 years, including occasional forays into international racing, such as the FIA GT Championship, and in 2002 he was a test driver of Minardi. He is a co-founder of BECEP, organization dedicated to safety of automobile traffic.
