= Rudolf Zajac =

Slovak politician (born 1951)

7th Minister of Health of Slovakia
- In office 15 October 2002 – 4 July 2006
- Preceded by: Roman Kováč
- Succeeded by: Ivan Valentovič

Personal details
- Born: 9 February 1951 (age 75) Bratislava, Czechoslovakia
- Party: Civic Conservative Party

Rudolf Zajac (born 9 February 1951) is a former Minister of Health of Slovakia in the government of Prime Minister Mikuláš Dzurinda, in office 2002 to 2006. He is well known for his radical and unpopular reform of health care in Slovakia. Nowadays he is in political retirement, but he has joined think-tanks mostly involved in health care issues.
