= Viliam Novotný =

Slovak politician and physician

Member of the National Council
- In office 15 October 2002 – 23 March 2016

Personal details
- Born: 13 March 1973 (age 53) Košice, Czechoslovakia
- Party: Slovak Democratic and Christian Union – Democratic Party; ŠANCA
- Children: 3
- Education: Pavol Jozef Šafárik University; Slovak Medical University

Viliam Novotný (born 13 March 1973) is a Slovak neurosurgeon and politician. In 2002–2016 he served as a member of the National Council. For most of his political career, he was a member of the Slovak Democratic and Christian Union – Democratic Party. He left the party in 2014 over disagreement with the direction of party leadership. Since 2016 he has been the leader of the small party ŠANCA.

Novotný studied medicine at Pavol Jozef Šafárik University and Slovak Medical University. He is married and has three children.
