= Hope (political party) =

Hope (Slovak: NÁDEJ) was a political party in Slovakia. It was founded in 2006 after a split from the Alliance of the New Citizen by Jirko Malchárek, František Tóth and Alexandra Novotná. From its inception it was widely considered by experts to be a doomed project. In the Slovak parliamentary election in 2006, the party did not gain a seat in the Slovak Parliament (it got only 0.63%; a minimum of 5% was required).

== History ==
The party was registered with the Ministry of Internal affairs on 6 March 2006. It was founded by former Deputy Prime Minister Jirko Malchárek, former Minister of Culture František Tóth and former Deputy Minister of Health Alexandra Novotná, who became the party leader. The founding congress took place on 11 March 2006 in Bratislava. The party was renamed to European Democratic Party in 2009, and was dissolved in 2019.

== Gorilla scandal ==
In December 2011, the co-called Gorilla file compiled by the Slovak Information Service leaked to the internet. Among other things it describes the background of the creation of the political party Hope, being privately owned and run by the Slovak investment company Penta Group. The company denies all allegations and considers the Gorilla file to be fake. One of the owners admitted to consulting the political party in economic matters.

== See also ==
- Slovak politics
- Slovak political scandals
