= Martin Fronc =

Slovak politician

Minister of Education of Slovakia
- In office 16 October 2002 – 8 February 2006
- Preceded by: Peter Ponický
- Succeeded by: László Szigeti

Personal details
- Born: 28 November 1947 (age 78) Košice, Czechoslovakia (present day Slovakia)
- Party: Christian Democratic Movement

Martin Fronc (born 28 November 1947) is a Slovak politician and former Minister of Education of Slovakia. He studied at Comenius University in Bratislava at Faculty of natural sciences. His studies were focused on mathematics. His academic career continued at University of Transport and Communications in Žilina where achieved several academic titles. He entered politics in 1989 as a member of Christian Democratic Movement and after elections in 2002 he became Minister of Education of Slovakia. Martin Fronc is married and he has three children.
