= Klieština =

- Municipality
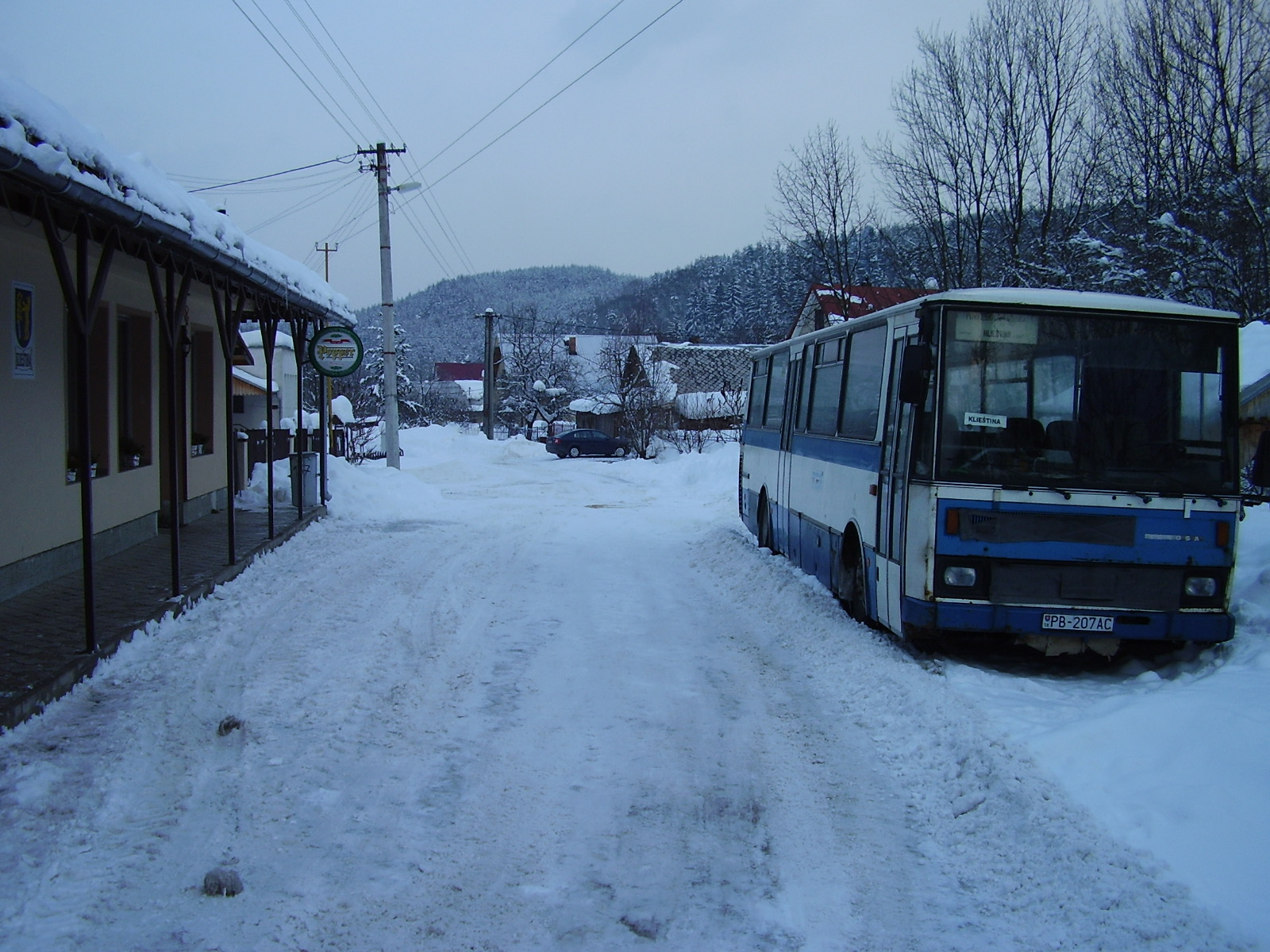

- Flag

- Location of Klieština in the Trenčín Region Location of Klieština in Slovakia
- Coordinates: 49.18°N 18.35°E
- Country: Slovakia
- Region: Trenčín Region
- District: Považská Bystrica District
- First mentioned: 1408

Area
  - Total: 5.31 km^{2} (2.05 sq mi)
- Elevation: 360 m (1,180 ft)

Population (2025)
  - Total: 332
- Time zone: UTC+1 (CET)
  - Summer (DST): UTC+2 (CEST)
- Postal code: 180 2
- Area code: +421 42
- Vehicle registration plate (until 2022): PB
- Website: www.kliestina.sk

Klieština (Hungarian: Kelestény) is a village and municipality in Považská Bystrica District in the Trenčín Region of north-western Slovakia.

== History ==
The village was first mentioned in 1408 in historical records.

== Geography ==
The municipality lies at an altitude of 360 metres (1,180 ft) and covers an area of 5.31 km^{2} (2.05 sq mi) (2025).

== Population ==
Population statistic (10 years)
Year	1995	2005	2015	2025
Count	393	377	340	332
Difference		−4.07%	−9.81%	−2.35%

Population statistic
Year	2024	2025
Count	332	332
Difference		+0%

It has a population of 332 people (31 December 2025).

=== Ethnicity ===
Census 2021 (1+ %)
Ethnicity	Number	Fraction
Slovak	339	97.97%
Not found out	5	1.44%
Total	346	

In year 2021 was 346 people by ethnicity 339 as Slovak, 5 as Not found out, 2 as Other, 1 as Czech, 1 as Ukrainian and 1 as French.

Note on population: The difference values of population numbers in the table "Population statistic" and in the sections "Ethnicity" & "Religion" is caused by the use of various statistical methods.

=== Religion ===
Census 2021 (1+ %)
Religion	Number	Fraction
Roman Catholic Church	298	86.13%
None	19	5.49%
Other	9	2.6%
Greek Catholic Church	5	1.45%
Not found out	4	1.16%
Evangelical Church	4	1.16%
Ad hoc movements	4	1.16%
Total	346	

In year 2021 was 346 people by religion 298 from Roman Catholic Church, 19 from None, 9 from Other, 5 from Greek Catholic Church, 4 from Not found out, 4 from Evangelical Church, 4 from Ad hoc movements, 1 from Eastern Orthodox Church, 1 from Christian Congregations in Slovakia and 1 from Church of the Brethren.

== Genealogical resources ==
The records for genealogical research are available at the state archive "Statny Archiv in Bytca, Slovakia"

- Roman Catholic church records (births/marriages/deaths): 1756-1895 (parish B)

== See also ==
- List of municipalities and towns in Slovakia
