= Alliance of the New Citizen =

Alliance of the New Citizen Aliancia nového občana
- Leader: Pavol Rusko (2001–07); Robert Nemcsics (2007–11)
- Founded: 2001
- Dissolved: 2017
- Ideology: Liberalism; Populism; Conservative liberalism Economic liberalism
- Political position: Centre-right
- European affiliation: ELDR
- European Parliament group: ELDR (2004)
- International affiliation: Liberal International (2001–2009)

The Alliance of the New Citizen (Slovak: Aliancia nového občana, ANO) was a liberal political party in Slovakia existing from 2001 to 2011. The acronym was a pun on áno, Slovak for "yes". It was founded and led by media entrepreneur Pavol Rusko. The party positioned itself as liberal and was a member of international liberal organisations. It was part of the centre-right governing coalition of Prime Minister Mikuláš Dzurinda from October 2002 to September 2005.

After its first election, its populist appeal waned and it developed a more liberal approach.

ANO was legally renamed and thus succeeded (but not in terms of personnel or political positions) by the Free Word Party of Nora Mojsejová (Slovak: Strana Slobodné Slovo – Nory Mojsejovej, SSS-NM) in November 2011, when Eleonóra Mojsejová a Slovak businesswoman and TV personality took over the party. The party changed its name to CITIZENS (Slovak: OBČANIA) in 2013 and in 2014 to IDEA. It was finally dissolved in 2017. Its last president was Miroslav Leňo.

== Foundation ==
The party was founded in 2001 as the Alliance of the New Citizen (ANO). It was the first modern political party in Slovakia to consider itself to be liberal. Its leader Pavol Rusko was also the founder and former owner of Markíza (the biggest commercial TV channel in Slovakia). Rusko at first thought to join the Party of Civic Understanding (SOP) which was part of the previous government, yet after some bad blood, around January 2001 Rusko decided to create a new political party.

== Elections and government participation ==
In August 2002, Pavol Rusko claimed that the party is financed completely from his own money, and the money of his close friend, businessman Ján Kováčik who borrowed the party an undisclosed sum of money. Rusko estimated the cost of the political party to 25 million Slovak korunas so far, with an additional 15 million expected for the campaign before the 2002 Slovak parliamentary election. In the election, the party finished sixth, gaining 230,309 votes (8.01% total) and capturing 15 out of 150 seats in the National Council of the Slovak Republic.

ANO was a member of the government coalition together with SDKÚ, SMK-MKP and KDH from October 2002 to September 2005, when it was expelled from the coalition after disputes with both SDKÚ and KDH. The party remained in opposition until the next parliamentary election but a group of MPs around Ľubomír Lintner continued to support the government.

The following ANO nominees were part of the Second Mikuláš Dzurinda government:

- Deputy Prime Minister - Robert Nemcsics (16 October 2002 — 9 September 2003)
- Deputy Prime Minister - Pavol Rusko (23 September 2003 — 24 August 2005)
- Deputy Prime Minister - Jirko Malchárek (4 October 2005 — 4 July 2006)
- Minister of Industry - Robert Nemcsics (16 October 2002 — 9 September 2003)
- Minister of Industry - Pavol Rusko (23 September 2003 — 24 August 2005)
- Minister of Culture - Rudolf Chmel (16 October 2002 — 24 May 2005)
- Minister of Culture - František Tóth (24 May 2005 — 5 April 2006)
- Minister of Culture - Rudolf Chmel (5 April 2006 — 4 July 2006)
- Minister of Health - Rudolf Zajac (16 October 2002 — 4 July 2006)

In March 2003 an internal conflict started within the party between its leader Pavol Rusko and Economy Minister Robert Nemcsics and Deputy Transport Minister Branislav Opaterný. The party's regional organizations unanimously supported Rusko and the party's regional board meetings unambiguously called on both Nemcsics and Opaterný to abdicate from their positions and give up their deputy mandates.

On 6 March 2006, Jirko Malchárek, František Tóth and Alexandra Novotná created a new political party Hope.

In the parliamentary election of June 17, 2006, the party won only 1.42% of the popular vote and lost parliamentary representation. It did not take part in other elections and slowly fell into obscurity.

== Successor parties ==
In 2011 the party was bought by a known Slovak businesswoman Nora Mojsejová who did not have to collect thousands of signatures needed by law to register a new political party. If a party that is already registered changes its name, no signatures are necessary. Mojsejová changed its name to Free Word Party of Nora Mojsejová and entered the 2012 Slovak parliamentary election where she received 1.22% of votes, not winning any seats in the National Council but finishing ahead of long-time Slovak Prime Minister Vladimír Mečiar's People's Party – Movement for a Democratic Slovakia (HZDS).

In 2013 party changed its name to CITIZENS. In 2014 party changed again its name to IDEA and new president became Miroslav Leňo.

== Party leadership ==
- 2001–07 Pavol Rusko
- 2007–11 Robert Nemcsics
- 2011–13 Eleonóra Mojsejová
- 2013–14 Miroslav Mišánik
- 2014–17Miroslav Leňo
