= 2002 Slovak parliamentary election =

- 20–21 September 2002

All 150 seats in the National Council 76 seats needed for a majority
- Turnout: 70.07% (▼14.18 pp)
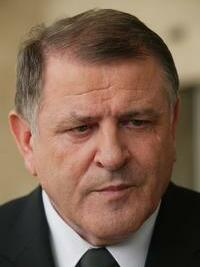

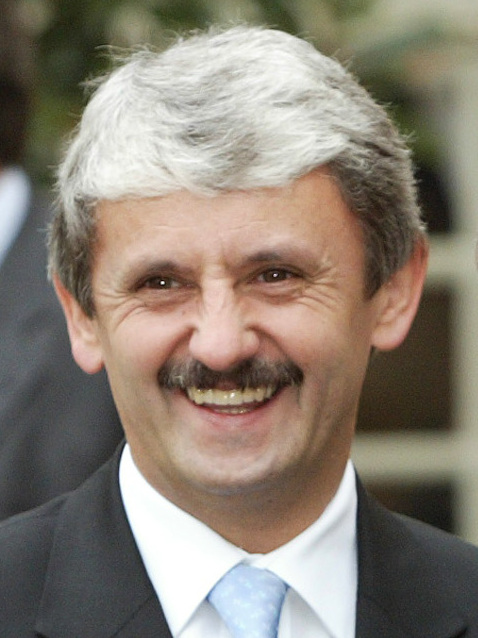

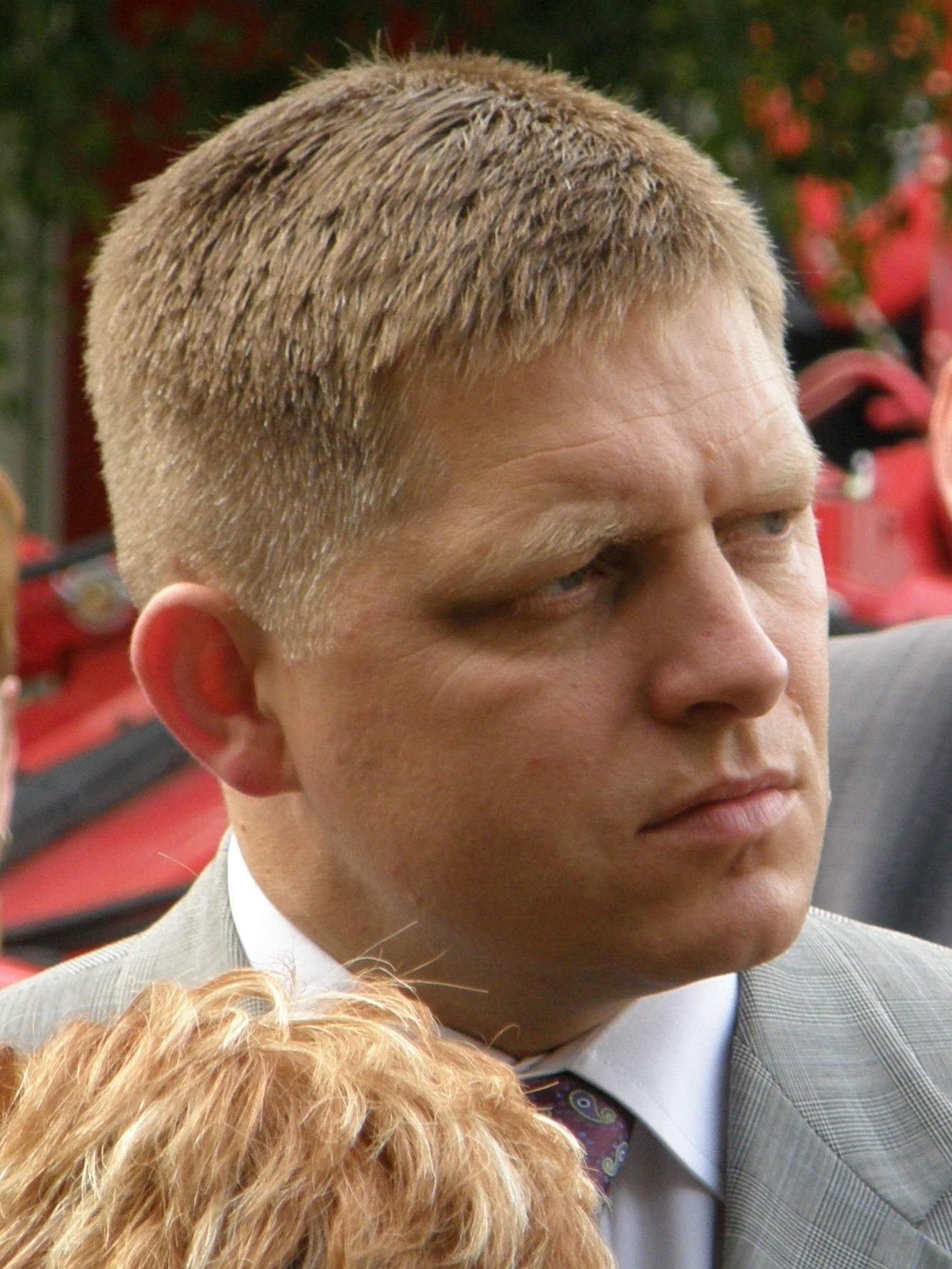

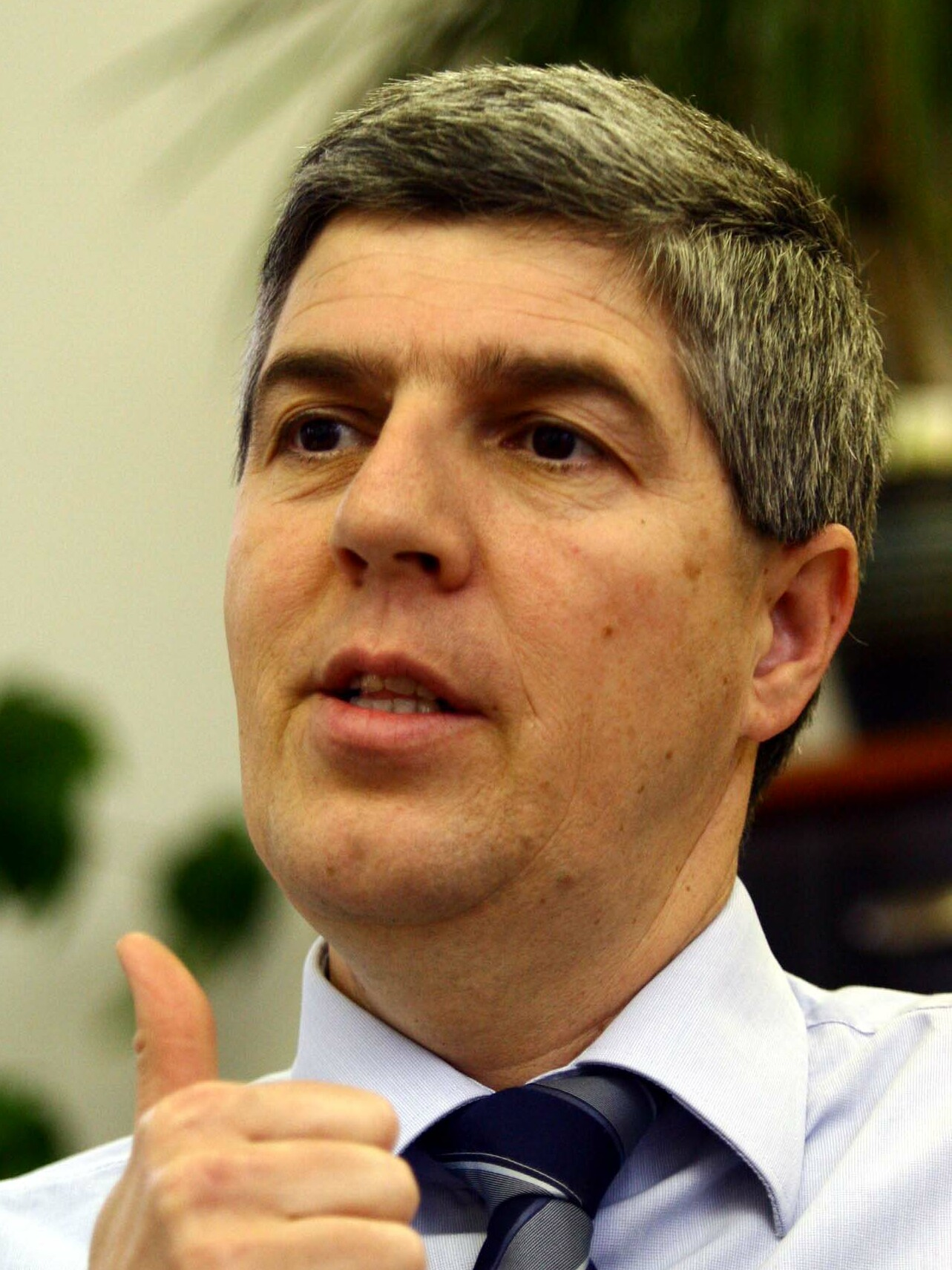

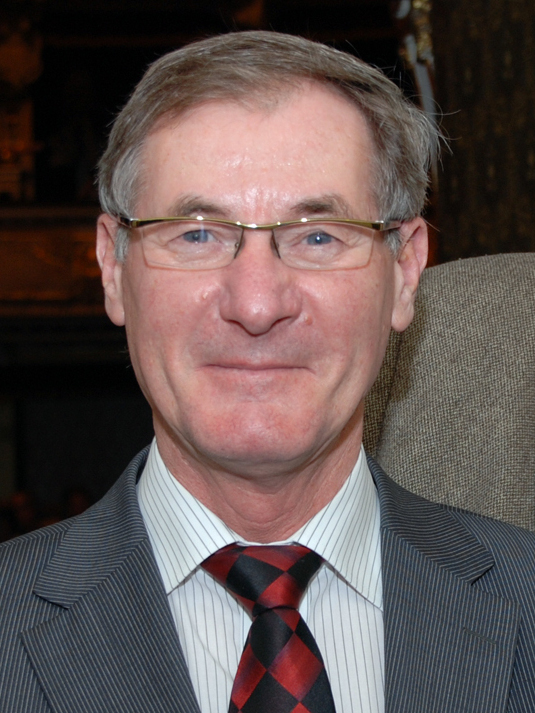

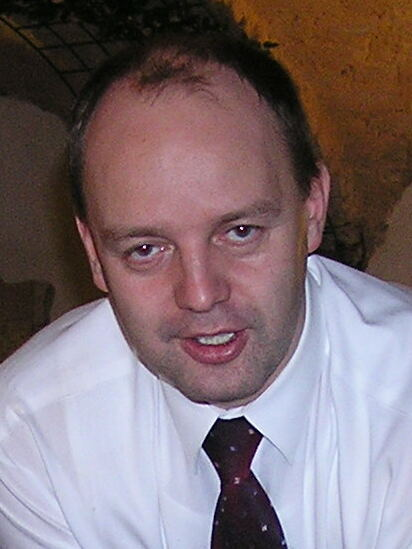
	First party	Second party	Third party
Leader	Vladimír Mečiar	Mikuláš Dzurinda	Robert Fico
Party	HZDS	SDKÚ	Smer
Last election	43 seats, 27.0%	Did not exist	Did not exist
Seats won	36	28	25
Seat change	▼7	New	New
Popular vote	560,691	433,953	387,100
Percentage	19.5%	15.1%	13.5%
Swing	▼7.5 pp	New	New
	Fourth party	Fifth party	Sixth party
Leader	Béla Bugár	Pavol Hrušovský	Pavol Rusko
Party	SMK	KDH	ANO
Last election	15 seats, 9.1%	In SDK	Did not exist
Seats won	20	15	15
Seat change	▲5	N/A	New
Popular vote	321,069	237,202	237,202
Percentage	11.2%	8.3%	8.0%
Swing	▲2.0 pp	N/A	New
	Seventh party
Leader	Jozef Ševc
Party	KSS
Last election	0 seats, 2.8%
Seats won	11
Seat change	▲11
Popular vote	181,872
Percentage	6.3%
Swing	▲3.5 pp
- Results of the election, showing plurality by district
Prime Minister before election
Mikuláš Dzurinda
SDKÚ
Elected Prime Minister
Mikuláš Dzurinda
SDKÚ

Parliamentary elections were held in Slovakia on 20 and 21 September 2002. The Movement for a Democratic Slovakia remained the largest party in the National Council, winning 36 of the 150 seats. Mikuláš Dzurinda of the Slovak Democratic and Christian Union remained Prime Minister, in coalition with the Party of the Hungarian Coalition, Christian Democratic Movement, and Alliance of the New Citizen parties.

== Participating parties ==
Party	Ideology	Political position	Leader
Movement for a Democratic Slovakia (HZDS)	Slovak nationalism Populism	Syncretic	Vladimír Mečiar
Slovak Democratic and Christian Union (SDKÚ)	Liberal conservatism Christian democracy	Centre-right	Mikuláš Dzurinda
Direction (Smer)	Social democracy Democratic socialism	Centre-left	Robert Fico
Party of the Hungarian Coalition (MKP/SMK)	Hungarian minority interests Christian democracy	Centre-right	Béla Bugár
Christian Democratic Movement (KDH)	Christian democracy Economic liberalism	Centre-right	Pavol Hrušovský
Alliance of the New Citizen (ANO)	Liberalism; Populism	Centre-right	Pavol Rusko
Communist Party of Slovakia (KSS)	Communism; Marxism–Leninism	Far-left	Jozef Ševc

== Results ==
Party	Votes	%	+/–	Seats	+/–
Movement for a Democratic Slovakia	560,691	19.50	–7.50	36	–7
Slovak Democratic and Christian Union	433,953	15.09	New	28	New
Direction	387,100	13.46	New	25	New
Party of the Hungarian Coalition	321,069	11.17	+2.04	20	+5
Christian Democratic Movement	237,202	8.25	–	15	–
Alliance of the New Citizen	230,309	8.01	New	15	New
Communist Party of Slovakia	181,872	6.33	+3.53	11	+11
True Slovak National Party	105,084	3.65	New	0	New
Slovak National Party	95,633	3.33	–5.75	0	–14
Movement for Democracy	94,324	3.28	New	0	New
Social Democratic Alternative	51,649	1.80	New	0	New
Party of the Democratic Left	39,163	1.36	–13.30	0	–23
Green Party	28,365	0.99	New	0	New
Independent Civic Party of the Unemployed and Injured	26,205	0.91	New	0	New
Union of the Workers of Slovakia	15,755	0.55	–0.76	0	0
Woman and Family	12,646	0.44	New	0	New
Civic Conservative Party	9,422	0.33	New	0	New
Workers' Party–ROSA	8,699	0.30	New	0	New
Roma Civic Initiative	8,420	0.29	New	0	New
Party for Democratic Civic Rights	6,716	0.23	New	0	New
Left Bloc	6,441	0.22	New	0	New
Political Movement of Roma in Slovakia–ROMA	6,234	0.22	New	0	New
Slovak National Unity	4,548	0.16	+0.02	0	0
B–Revolutionary Workers' Party	2,818	0.10	–0.03	0	0
People's Party	763	0.03	New	0	New
Total	2,875,081	100.00	–	150	0
Valid votes	2,875,081	98.69			
Invalid/blank votes	38,186	1.31			
Total votes	2,913,267	100.00			
Registered voters/turnout	4,157,802	70.07			
Source: Nohlen & Stöver
