= Robert Nemcsics =

Slovak politician

Minister of Economy of Slovakia
- In office October 12, 2002 – September 10, 2003
- Preceded by: Ľubomír Harach
- Succeeded by: Pavol Rusko, since September 24, 2003, Pavol Prokopovič (acting, September 10 - September 24)

Personal details
- Born: September 21, 1961 (age 64) Trenčianske Teplice, Czechoslovakia (present day Slovakia)

Robert Nemcsics is a Slovak politician. He served as a deputy prime minister, Minister of Economy and acting Minister of Privatization. He has experience with high management because before he entered politics he was a manager in several important Slovak companies.

== More information ==
- http://www.government.gov.sk/english/minister_mh_nemcsics.html
- http://www.leaders.sk/index.php?id=814
