= 2006 Slovak parliamentary election =

- 17 June 2006

All 150 seats in the National Council 76 seats needed for a majority
- Turnout: 54.67% (▼15.40 pp)
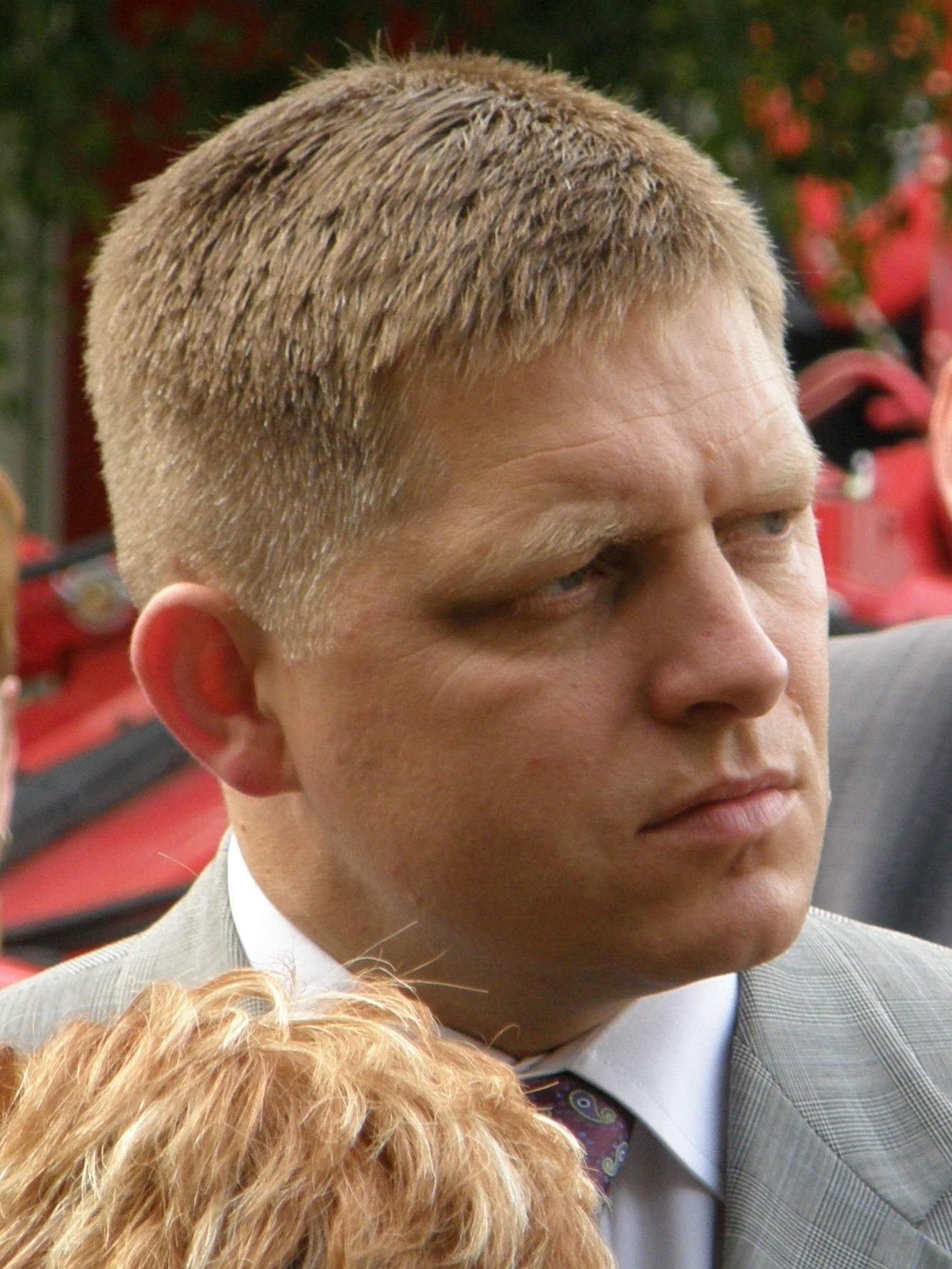

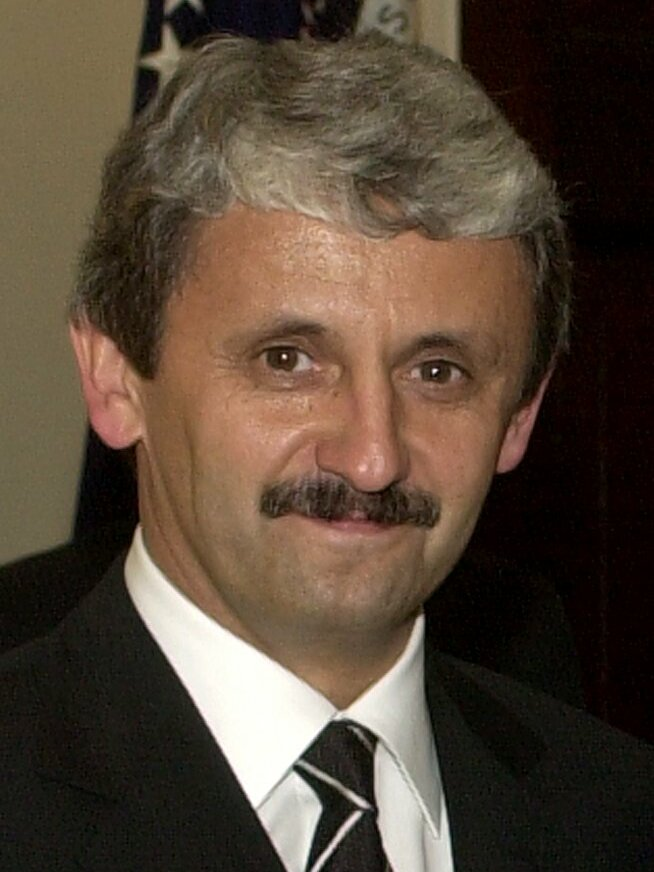

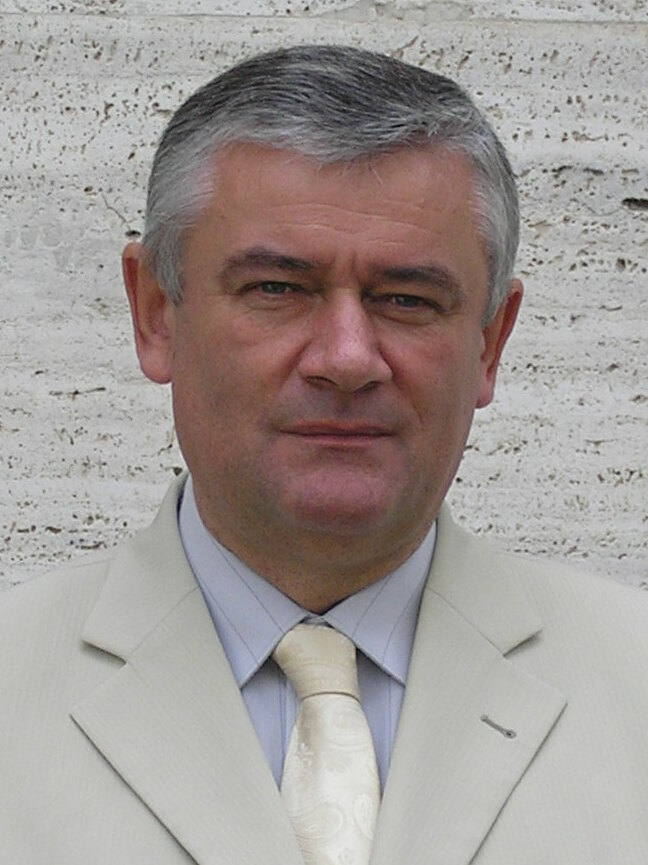

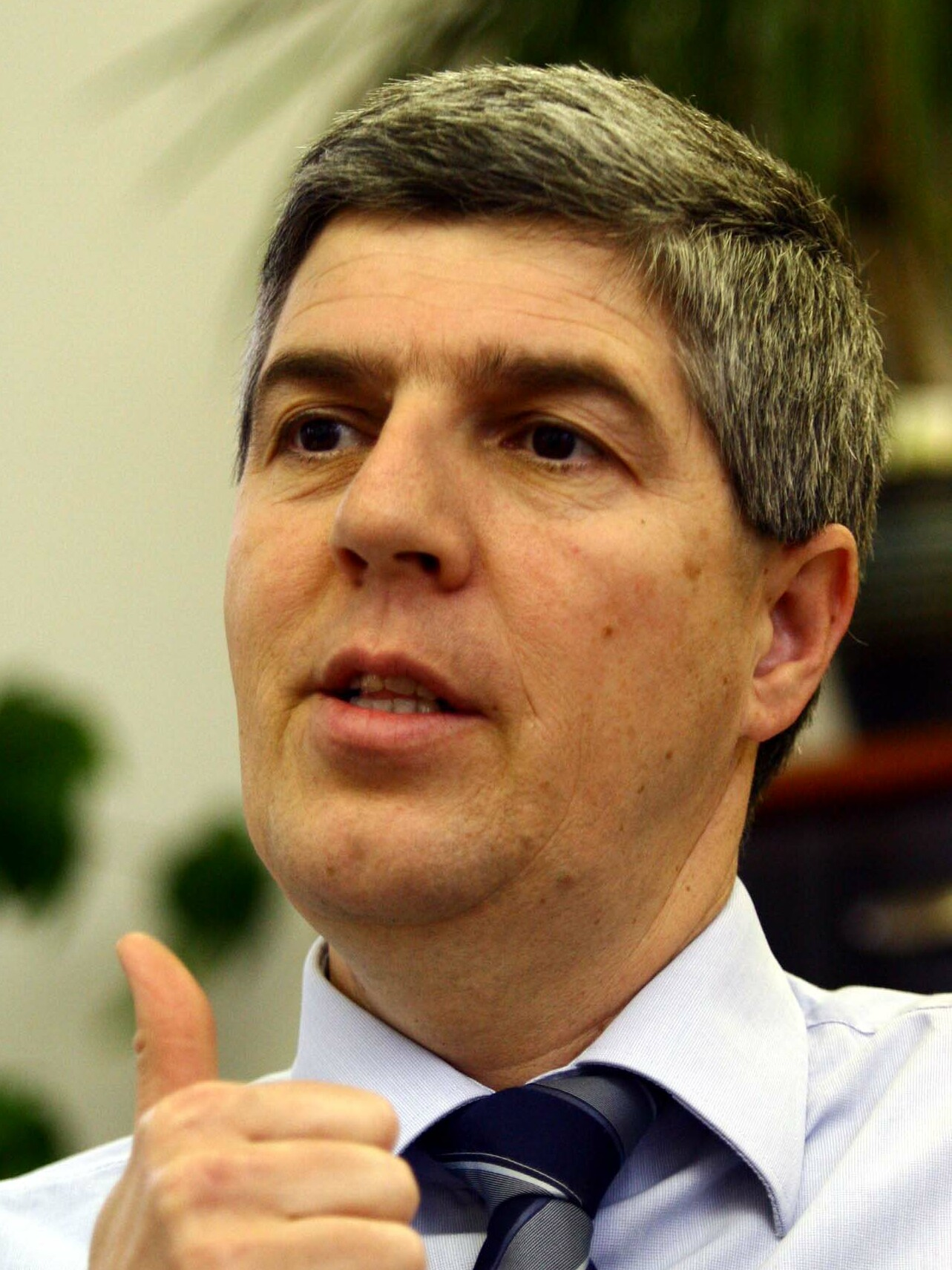

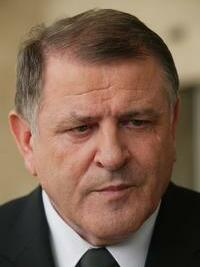

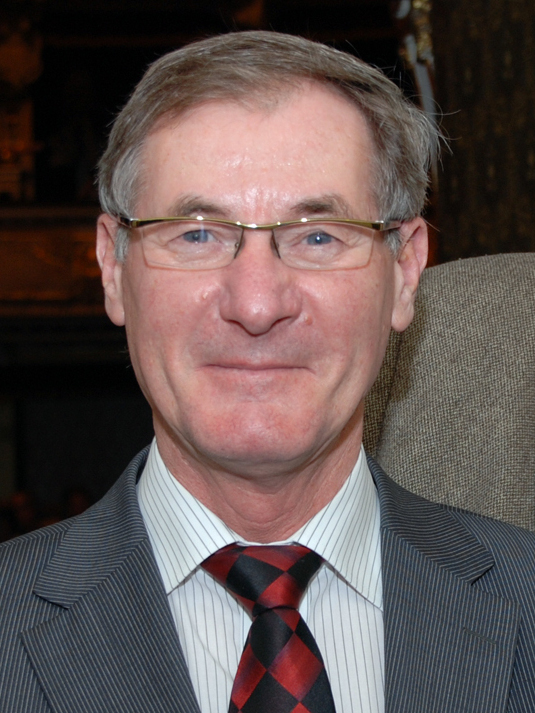
	First party	Second party	Third party
Leader	Robert Fico	Mikuláš Dzurinda	Ján Slota
Party	Smer	SDKÚ–DS	SNS
Last election	25 seats, 13.5%	28 seats, 15.1%	0 seats, 3.3%
Seats won	50	31	20
Seat change	▲25	▲3	▲20
Popular vote	671,185	422,815	270,230
Percentage	29.1%	18.4%	11.7%
Swing	▲15.7 pp	▲3.3 pp	▲8.4 pp
	Fourth party	Fifth party	Sixth party
Leader	Béla Bugár	Vladimír Mečiar	Pavol Hrušovský
Party	SMK	ĽS–HZDS	KDH
Last election	20 seats, 11.2%	36 seats, 19.5%	15 seats, 8.3%
Seats won	20	15	14
Seat change	0	▼21	▼1
Popular vote	269,111	202,540	191,443
Percentage	11.7%	8.8%	8.3%
Swing	▲0.5 pp	▼10.7 pp	▲0.1%
- Results of the election, showing vote strength by district.
Prime Minister before election
Mikuláš Dzurinda
SDKÚ–DS
Elected Prime Minister
Robert Fico
Smer

Parliamentary elections were held in Slovakia on 17 June 2006. Direction – Social Democracy emerged as the largest party in the National Council, winning 50 of the 150 seats. Its leader Robert Fico was appointed Prime Minister on 4 July 2006, leading a three-party centre-left populist coalition.

== Background ==
Originally the election was planned for 16 September 2006. However, on 8 February the government proposed calling an early election after the Christian Democratic Movement left the coalition government. This proposal was passed by the Parliament on 9 February and signed by the President on 13 February. For the first time Slovak citizens living abroad could vote, using absentee ballots. A total of 21 parties contested the elections.

== Participating parties ==
Party	Ideology	Political position	Leader
Direction – Social Democracy (Smer)	Social democracy	Centre-left	Robert Fico
Slovak Democratic and Christian Union – Democratic Party (SDKÚ–DS)	Liberal conservatism	Centre-right	Mikuláš Dzurinda
Slovak National Party (SNS)	National conservatism	Far-right	Ján Slota
Party of the Hungarian Coalition (SMK/MKP)	Hungarian minority interests	Centre-right	Béla Bugár
People's Party – Movement for a Democratic Slovakia (ĽS–HZDS)	Slovak nationalism	Syncretic	Vladimír Mečiar
Christian Democratic Movement (KDH)	Christian democracy	Centre-right	Pavol Hrušovský

== Results ==
Party	Votes	%	+/–	Seats	+/–
Direction – Social Democracy	671,185	29.14	+15.68	50	+25
Slovak Democratic and Christian Union – Democratic Party	422,815	18.36	+3.26	31	+3
Slovak National Party	270,230	11.73	+8.41	20	+20
Party of the Hungarian Coalition	269,111	11.68	+0.52	20	0
People's Party – Movement for a Democratic Slovakia	202,540	8.79	–10.71	15	–21
Christian Democratic Movement	191,443	8.31	+0.06	14	–1
Communist Party of Slovakia	89,418	3.88	–2.44	0	–11
Free Forum	79,963	3.47	New	0	New
Alliance of the New Citizen	32,775	1.42	–6.59	0	–15
Movement for Democracy	14,728	0.64	–2.64	0	0
Hope	14,595	0.63	New	0	New
Left Bloc	9,174	0.40	+0.17	0	0
Union of the Workers of Slovakia	6,864	0.30	–0.25	0	0
Civic Conservative Party	6,262	0.27	–0.06	0	0
Slovak National Coalition–Slovak Reciprocity	4,016	0.17	New	0	New
Slovak People's Party	3,815	0.17	New	0	New
Agrarian and Countryside Party	3,160	0.14	New	0	New
Prosperity of Slovakia	3,118	0.14	New	0	New
Party of the Democratic Left	2,906	0.13	New	0	New
Mission 21–New Christian Democracy	2,523	0.11	New	0	New
Party of Civic Solidarity	2,498	0.11	New	0	New
Total	2,303,139	100.00	–	150	0
Valid votes	2,303,139	98.60			
Invalid/blank votes	32,778	1.40			
Total votes	2,335,917	100.00			
Registered voters/turnout	4,272,517	54.67			
Source: Nohlen & Stöver, European Elections Database

=== Results by region ===
Region	Smer	SDKÚ–DS	SNS	SMK–MKP	ĽS–HZDS	KDH	KSS	SF	ÁNO	Other parties
Bratislava Region	21.42	36.05	8.80	6.12	6.75	7.87	2.96	5.77	1.38	2.94
Trnava Region	23.26	15.93	7.83	29.00	7.46	7.39	3.03	2.58	0.98	2.60
Trenčín Region	33.98	15.03	15.90	0.34	14.29	7.93	4.74	3.34	1.20	3.23
Nitra Region	24.82	12.30	9.32	31.67	7.98	5.41	2.90	2.19	1.07	2.31
Žilina Region	33.01	14.78	18.83	0.27	10.80	10.91	4.01	3.37	1.37	2.65
Banská Bystrica Region	31.08	15.74	13.37	12.49	8.05	5.07	5.12	3.31	1.62	4.17
Prešov Region	35.44	17.93	10.73	0.34	8.40	13.97	4.26	3.27	1.59	4.21
Košice Region	29.48	19.20	8.63	14.27	6.70	7.73	4.00	3.87	2.07	3.99
Total in Slovakia	29.14	18.36	11.73	11.68	8.79	8.31	3.88	3.47	1.42	3.62
Cities	28.81	24.13	11.09	7.92	7.56	7.53	3.83	4.49	1.64	2.96
Villages	29.54	11.22	12.51	16.32	10.31	9.26	3.94	2.20	1.15	3.49

== Aftermath ==
On 28 June, Fico announced that the government coalition would consist of his Smer–SD, together with the SNS and ĽS–HZDS. The Party of European Socialists (PES) criticized this decision because of nationalist statements of the leader of the SNS and subsequently suspended Smer–SD's membership.
