= Slovak Democratic and Christian Union – Democratic Party =

Slovak Democratic and Christian Union – Democratic Party Slovenská demokratická a kresťanská únia
- Abbreviation: SDKÚ–DS
- Leader: Branislav Rybárik
- Founder: Mikuláš Dzurinda
- Founded: 18 February 2000
- Preceded by: Slovak Democratic Coalition (de facto)
- Headquarters: Zámocká 4771/22, 811 08 Bratislava
- Youth wing: New Generation
- Membership (2021): 4
- Ideology: Liberal conservatism; Christian democracy
- Political position: Centre-right
- European affiliation: European People's Party (formerly)
- European Parliament group: European People's Party Group (formerly)
- International affiliation: Centrist Democrat International (formerly)
- Colours: Blue
- Slogan: Pre ľudí a o ľuďoch ('For people and about people')
- National Council: 0 / 150
- European Parliament: 0 / 15

Website
- www.sdkuds.sk

The Slovak Democratic and Christian Union – Democratic Party (Slovak: Slovenská demokratická a kresťanská únia – Demokratická strana, SDKÚ–DS), known as the Slovak Democratic and Christian Union (Slovak: Slovenská demokratická a kresťanská únia, SDKÚ) until 2006, is a liberal-conservative and Christian-democratic political party in Slovakia founded in 2000. Legally a new political entity, it emerged from the dissolution of the Slovak Democratic Coalition. It was led by Mikuláš Dzurinda from 2000 to 2012.

It was a major political party in Slovakia and the most popular centre-right party in the country following its independence in 1993. The party led two non-consecutive governments, from 2002 to 2006 and from 2010 to 2012. Under SDKÚ, Slovakia acceded to the European Union and NATO and underwent a period of democratic consolidation. The party carried out a neoliberal restructuring of the country's economy, which led to significant gross domestic product growth. At the same time, its tenure was marked by corruption allegations, persistent political instability within the government, and significant social tensions.

Legally still active, the party lost all representation in the European Parliament in 2015 and in the national legislature in 2016, and has remained unrepresented since. It was affiliated with the European People's Party and the Centrist Democrat International.

== History ==
=== Foundation ===
In 1998, SDK was created as coalition of five small centre-right and centre-left parties intending to contest the Slovak parliamentary elections that year. The initial agreement was to form a party with 150 members and dissolve it after elections in 1998. After successful 1998 elections, SDK formed government with KDH, SDĽ and SMK-MKP. This initial agreement was not successful, and Prime Minister Mikuláš Dzurinda (KDH) announced formation of new party - Slovak Democratic and Christian Union (SDKÚ). Some SDK members joined the new party while others returned to their original parties. The new party was registered on 18 February 2000. On 18 November Constitution congress elected Mikuláš Dzurinda as chairman, vice chairmen being Edvard Kukan, Zuzana Martináková, Milan Kňažko and Ľubomír Harach. Gabriel Palacka became responsible for finances.

=== First time in government: 1998–2006 ===
After its creation, a majority of ministers of Slovak government were members of SDKÚ. SDKÚ was considered to be most reform oriented party. Its coalition partners were Party of the Hungarian Coalition, Party of Civic Understanding and Party of the Democratic Left.

In the 2006 Slovak parliamentary election, the party won 18.4% of the popular vote and 31 out of 150 seats in the National Council. Despite losing a large number of votes, the party was still able to form coalition government with former partners such as the Christian Democratic Movement, Party of the Hungarian Coalition and new party Alliance of the New Citizen. However, the opposition centre-left populist Smer-SD could able to form coalition with Slovak National Party and

=== Second time in government: 2010–2012 ===
For the 2010 parliamentary election, Dzurinda yielded the number-one slot on the party's list to Iveta Radičová, though he remained party chairman. In this election, the party won 15.42% of popular vote corresponding to 28 seats in the National Council. Iveta Radičová become the first female prime minister in history of Slovakia, by forming a new centre-right coalition government consisted of SDKÚ-DS, SaS, MOST-HÍD and KDH. By custom, president Ivan Gašparovič first gave charge to form a new government to winning party SMER-SD and its leader Robert Fico, who was unable to do so due to Smer-SD and SNS only having 71 seats. The centre-right coalition Government collapsed on 11 October 2011 after lost confidence in parliament. Radičová subsequently decided not take candidacy in next elections and served as prime minister until a social democratic government took office on 4 April 2012.

=== 2012 election ===
Mikuláš Dzurinda led party to 2012 parliamentary election. The party was defeated badly, receiving just 6.09% of the votes and losing more than half of its seats. Dzurinda chose to resign from his position as the chairman of SDKÚ, and a party congress was held on 19 May 2012 so that a new leader could be chosen. Pavol Frešo, Lucia Žitňanská and Viliam Novotný were the candidates, Frešo finally won with 242 out of 404 votes. Lucia Žitňanská received 142 votes and announced she will not be a candidate for the position of vice-chairperson.

Candidate	first round	% in first round	second round	% in second round
Pavol Frešo	178	46.48%	242	63.02%
Lucia Žitňanská	146	38.12%	142	36.98%
Viliam Novotný	59	15.40%	-	-
Total	383	100%	384	100%

In the 2014 European elections, SDKÚ-DS came third place nationally, receiving 7.75% of the vote and electing 2 MEPs.

Out of 11 PMs elected in 2012 only 1 remained in the party as of 2015.

=== 2016 election ===
The party was led by Pavol Frešo. However, during the previous term SDKÚ-DS practically fell apart from inside, when its own members of parliament chose to leave the party. As a result, Frešo has a tough position and even if his campaign was led along with Slovak right-wing consensus against the SMER-SD party, it failed. While gaining only 0,27% of votes and losing 95% of its previous voters in the election of 5.3.2016, the party has received its worst result in history. SDKÚ-DS has won only in one village, Pavlovce in Rimavská Sobota District. Frešo has commented that SDKÚ-DS as the only party has defended openly pro-European ideas, opposing the building of fences against the immigrants in European migrant crisis. The chairman said that the situation was a big challenge for the presidium.

=== Decline ===
A party congress was held on 2 July 2016. Pavol Frešo stepped down from leadership of the party. New Vice-Chairmans were elected. The leader was expected to be elected later in 2016. It was reported in April 2018 that party de facto ceased to exist as it lacks membership and structure. The party was expelled from European People's Party as a result. Igor Rattaj took over party's property and became owner of Party's trademark during September 2018. Rattaj stated that party is now only the Trademark and he will sell it if anyone expresses interest. Leader of the Party Milan Roman at the time ran for the position of Mayor in Skalice as an independent candidate.

=== 2023 election ===
The party ran in the 2023 Slovak parliamentary election led by Branislav Rybárik. It received 771 votes (0,03%) and finished last. The party also ran in the 2024 European election, receiving 416 votes (0,03%) and again finishing last.

== Ideology ==
SDKÚ-DS were a centre-right liberal conservative party, presenting itself as an alternative to the social-democratic and populist ideology of the Direction – Social Democracy (Smer-SD) party. After the general elections in 2010, SDKÚ-DS reached an agreement with other centre-right parties and formed the government of Slovakia. The party criticised the policies of Robert Fico's Smer-SD party, calling them irresponsible, unsustainable and populist. SDKÚ-DS was the fifth largest party in the National Council during years 2012–2016. Its policy included continuing in reforms that took place before 2006, including tax reform, welfare benefits cuts, pensions reform, healthcare reform etc. SDKÚ-DS was then organised into four sections:

- Team for recovery and modernisation, led by Ivan Mikloš,
- Team for a dignified life, led by Iveta Radičová,
- Anti-crisis team, led by newcomer Eugen Jurzyca,
- Team for law and justice, led by Lucia Žitňanská.

The main partners of SDKÚ-DS were politically similar parties: Christian Democratic Movement, Freedom and Solidarity, and Most-Híd. Until 2012, these parties were in a coalition government with SDKÚ-DS.

== Election results ==
=== National Council ===
Election	Leader	Votes	%	Seats	+/–	Government
2002	Mikuláš Dzurinda	433,953	15.09 (#2)	28 / 150	▼16	Coalition
2006	Mikuláš Dzurinda	422,851	18.35 (#2)	31 / 150	▲3	Opposition
2010	Iveta Radičová	390,042	15.42 (#2)	28 / 150	▼3	Coalition
2012	Mikuláš Dzurinda	155,744	6.09 (#5)	11 / 150	▼17	Opposition
2016	Pavol Frešo	6,938	0.27 (#15)	0 / 150	▼11	Extra-parliamentary
2020	Did not participate			0 / 150	0	Extra-parliamentary
2023	Branislav Rybárik	771	0.03 (#25)	0 / 150	0	Extra-parliamentary

=== Presidential ===
Election	Candidate	First round		Second round		Result
Election	Candidate	Votes	%	Votes	%	Result
1999	Rudolf Schuster	1,396,950	47.37	1,727,481	57.18	Won
2004	Eduard Kukan	438,920	22.10			Lost
2009	Iveta Radičová	713,735	38.05	988,808	44.47	Lost
2014	Pavol Hrušovský	63,298	3.33			Lost

=== European Parliament ===
Election	List leader	Votes	%	Rank	Seats	+/–	EP Group
2004	Peter Šťastný	119,954	17.09%	1st	3 / 14	New	EPP-ED
2009	Eduard Kukan	140,426	16.98%	2nd	2 / 13	▼1	EPP
2014	Ivan Štefanec	43,467	7.75%	3rd	2 / 13	0	EPP
2019	Did not contest				0 / 14	▼2	–
2024	Branislav Rybárik	416	0.03%	23rd	0 / 15	0	–
