= Mikuláš Dzurinda =

Slovak politician (born 1955)

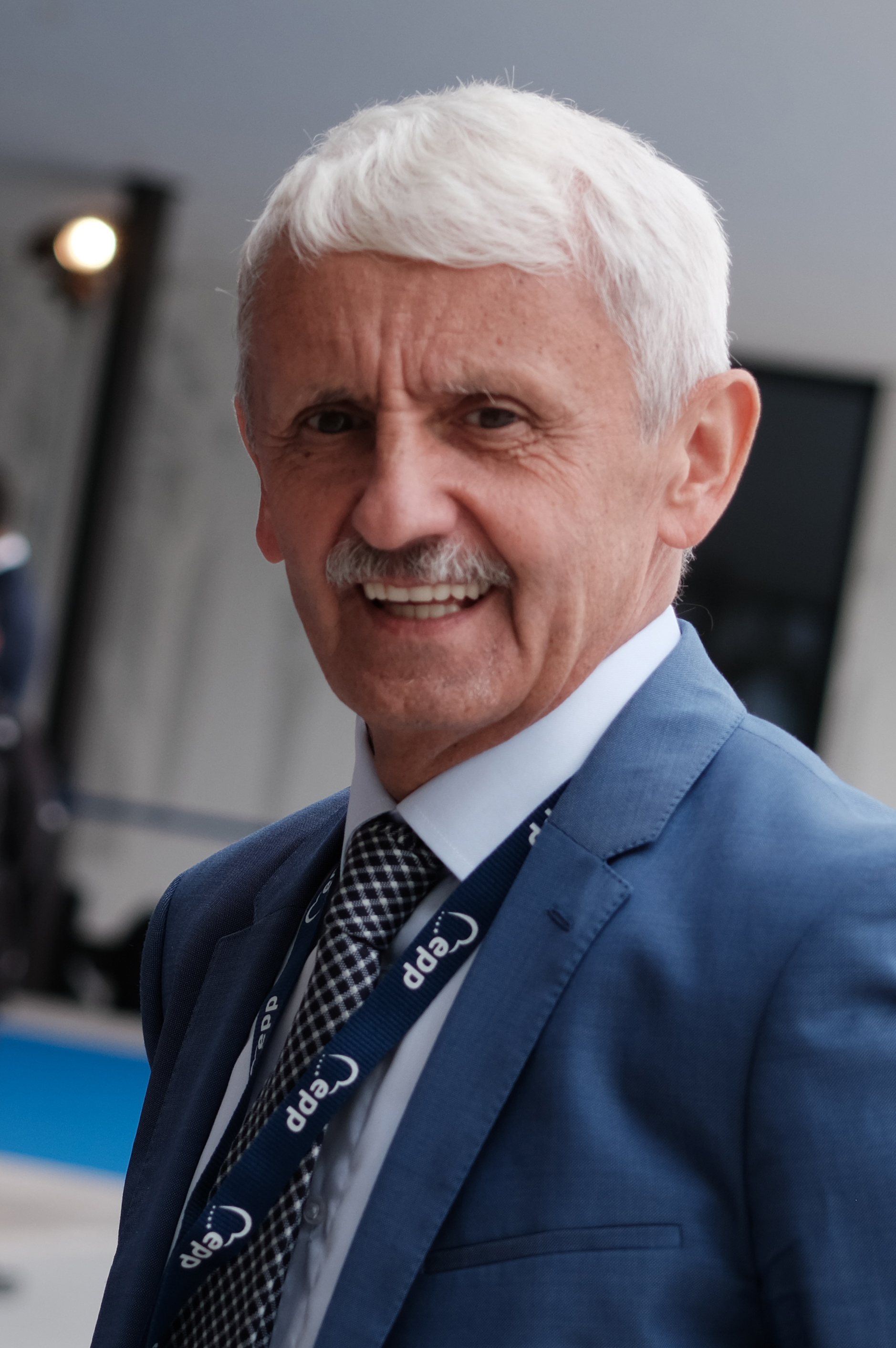
- Dzurinda in 2021

Acting President of Slovakia
- In office 30 October 1998 – 15 June 1999 Serving with Jozef Migaš
- Prime Minister: Himself
- Preceded by: Ivan Gašparovič (acting); Vladimír Mečiar (acting)
- Succeeded by: Rudolf Schuster

Prime Minister of Slovakia
- In office 30 October 1998 – 4 July 2006
- President: Rudolf Schuster; Ivan Gašparovič
- Preceded by: Vladimír Mečiar
- Succeeded by: Robert Fico

Minister of Foreign Affairs
- In office 8 July 2010 – 4 April 2012
- Prime Minister: Iveta Radičová
- Preceded by: Miroslav Lajčák
- Succeeded by: Miroslav Lajčák

Minister of Transport, Post and Telecommunications
- In office 16 March 1994 – 13 December 1994
- Prime Minister: Jozef Moravčík
- Preceded by: Roman Hofbauer
- Succeeded by: Alexander Rezeš

President of the Martens Centre
- Incumbent
- Assumed office 3 December 2013
- Preceded by: Wilfried Martens

Member of the National Council
- In office 23 June 1992 – 30 October 1998
- In office 4 July 2006 – 8 July 2010
- In office 4 April 2012 – 23 June 2016

Chairman of the Slovak Democratic and Christian Union – Democratic Party
- In office 18 February 2000 – 19 May 2012
- Preceded by: Position established
- Succeeded by: Pavol Frešo

Personal details
- Born: 4 February 1955 (age 71) Spišský Štvrtok, Czechoslovakia
- Party: KDH (1990–2000); SDK (1998–2002); SDKÚ–DS (2000–2014); Modrí (January–March 2023); MES (2023–2025)
- Spouse: Eva Dzurindová
- Education: University of Žilina

Mikuláš Dzurinda (Note: Slovak pronunciation: [ˈmikulaːʐ ˈdzurinda]) (born 4 February 1955) is a Slovak politician who was the prime minister of Slovakia from 30 October 1998 to 4 July 2006. Dzurinda is the founder and leader of the Slovak Democratic Coalition (SDK) and then the Slovak Democratic and Christian Union (SDKÚ–DS). From 2002 to 2006, his party formed a coalition government with the Christian Democratic Movement (KDH), the Alliance of the New Citizen (ANO), and the Party of the Hungarian Coalition (SMK–MKP).

Dzurinda's second government was labeled as a reformist and pro-market. Reforms included a flat tax of 19%, pension reform (second pillar), and education financing reform (except colleges and universities). During his term, Slovakia joined both the European Union and NATO. Dzurinda later served as Minister of Foreign Affairs in Prime Minister Iveta Radičová's coalition government from 2010 to 2012. On 3 December 2013, Dzurinda was elected as President of the Martens Centre, the think tank of the European People's Party.

== Early life ==
Dzurinda was born on 4 February 1955 in the eastern Slovak village of Spišský Štvrtok. He graduated from the College of Transport and Communications in Žilina in 1979. In 1988, he completed his post-graduate scientific research there and was awarded with a Candidate of Sciences (CSc.) degree. He worked for the Transport Research Institute (VÚD) in Žilina as an economic analyst (1979–1988). Later he was the director of an information technology section within the regional directorate of the Czechoslovak Railways (ČSD) in Bratislava (1988–1990). Dzurinda is married and has two daughters. He speaks Slovak, Czech, English, and French.

Dzurinda entered Slovak politics as one of the founding members of the Christian Democratic Movement (KDH), a conservative political party officially constituted in 1990. The first democratic general election in Czechoslovakia was held in 1990, and he was appointed Deputy Minister of Transportation and Posts of the Slovak Government in 1991. In 1992 he became a member of the Slovak parliament (National Council of the Slovak Republic) and worked as a member of the Committee for Budget and Finance. At the time of the split of Czechoslovakia and the establishment of an independent Slovakia (1993), he was KDH Deputy Chairman responsible for economy. During the tenure of Jozef Moravčík as Prime Minister (March–October 1994), Dzurinda was Minister of Transportation, Posts and Public Works. Following the 1994 general election, won by Vladimír Mečiar, he returned to the opposition as a member of the parliament.

== Prime Minister 1998–2002 ==
In response to the Election Act prepared and approved by Mečiar's government in 1997, five opposition parties (Christian Democratic Movement/KDH, Democratic Party/DS, Democratic Union/DU, Social Democratic Party of Slovakia/SDSS and the Green Party of Slovakia/SZS) formed the Slovak Democratic Coalition (SDK). Dzurinda became its spokesman, and later, on 4 July 1998, its chairman. Dzurinda was appointed as prime minister for the first time in October 1998, leading five opposition parties united as the Slovak Democratic Coalition (SDK) and defeating the government of Vladimír Mečiar at the polls.

Under Dzurinda's leadership Slovakia managed to re-enter integration processes and registered a political comeback in relations both with the European Union and trans-Atlantic economic and political structures. The success of the reforms put through by his cabinet were best reflected in Slovakia's entry into the OECD in September 2000, completion of accession negotiations with the European Union and the entry of major investors into the Slovak market. The U.S. Steel investment, for example, came with a pledge to invest more than a billion dollars here over the next decade.

In January 2000 he founded a new political party, the Slovak Democratic and Christian Union (SDKÚ), which he has chaired since. In an intra-party election in March 2002, SDKU members confirmed his leading position and following the September 2002 general election he was given the opportunity to again form the Slovak government. The Party of the Hungarian Coalition (SMK), Christian Democratic Union (KDH) and the Alliance of the New Citizen (ANO) have joined the SDKU in the ruling coalition. The Free Forum split from the SDKU in early 2004.

== Prime Minister 2002–2006 ==
The reformist course of Dzurinda's policies was confirmed by a mandate he was given by electors in the 2002 general election to form his second government. It was also a year when the NATO Prague Summit in November decided on Slovakia's invitation to join NATO; and the country also completed accession talks with the EU at the Copenhagen Summit in December, thus launching its ratification process. During this period, the budget deficit has been reduced to less than 3 percent of GDP, and it opened the door for Slovakia to join the eurozone in 2009. Economic growth, higher than 6 per cent, has become the fastest in the region. Nevertheless, foreign investors has discovered the country, notably car companies such as PSA Peugeot-Citroën and Kia.

The government of Mikuláš Dzurinda has been praised by the World Bank as the best market reformer in the world. Flat tax rate 19 per cent for income, corporates and value added tax led Steve Forbes to call Slovakia an "investors' paradise". But country was still facing many challenges, especially in rural areas. Unemployment increased to 20 percent under Dzurinda's first government, and was still at 12% when he left office, one of the highest rates in Europe. Dzurinda's party was defeated by SMER in the 2006 parliamentary election. SDKU-DS was second with more than 18 per cent of votes. Because of refusal to renew the right-wing coalition government with the support of Meciar's party he was not able to continue governing. SMER leader Robert Fico has formed a coalition government with Meciar's HZDS and Slota's Slovak National Party (SNS).

== Dzurinda in opposition 2006–2010 ==
Mikuláš Dzurinda has been a regular MP in the National Council of the Slovak Republic since his party's defeat in the 2006 parliamentary elections. In February 2008, Juraj Liška, SDKÚ-DS's deputy leader, openly asked Dzurinda to resign as the party leader due to the low party polls and the arguably undemocratic style of leadership. The members of the party presidium denied Liška's accusations and since the presidium assembly, Liška has been unwilling to speak out on the inner affairs of the party. This affair led to the open protests against Dzurinda from party members from Bratislava. Since their exclusion from the party by a regular party judge there are no longer any thrills in the party.

== Minister of Foreign Affairs 2010–2012 ==
Dzurinda was appointed as Minister of Foreign Affairs in the cabinet of prime minister Iveta Radičová on 9 July 2010. He was again elected to be the chairman of the SDKÚ-DS party on 6 November 2010 for next four years. He was only one candidate, the incumbent prime minister Radičová (from the same party) declined the nomination for candidacy.

== Public image ==
Dzurinda has been known for his enthusiasm for cycling and especially long distance running, cultivating an image of a healthy and competitive person. After the Dzurinda led-coalition defeated the autocratic Prime Minister Vladimír Mečiar, Dzurinda became unpopular with the People's Party - Movement for a Democratic Slovakia (ĽS-HZDS) electorate. While the media routinely covered ĽS-HZDS political meetings full of anti-Dzurinda rants, the most iconic representation of this antipathy was recorded by journalist Karol Lovaš at a ĽS-HZDS meeting in support of Gustav Krajči where a large group of 70- and 80-year-old citizens repeatedly shouted the slogan "Dzurinda is a Gypsy". Internationally, Dzurinda is perceived as a successful and progressive politician, mostly due to the internationally acclaimed economic reforms his government implemented during Dzurinda's second government (2002–2006). In 2006, United States president George W. Bush called Dzurinda a friend and issued his admiration.

== Other activities ==
Dzurinda has lectured at North American and European universities, and to both experts and public audiences. He is a strong advocate of trans-Atlantic ties. He has met and talked personally to leading foreign politicians, including U.S. presidents Bill Clinton and George W. Bush, German Chancellor Gerhard Schröder, British Prime Minister Tony Blair, European Commission President Romano Prodi, NATO Secretary General Lord George Robertson, and several influential US senators and congressmen. Under his leadership, the Visegrád Group—a co-operative grouping of the Czech Republic, Hungary, Poland and Slovakia—was revived and gained new stimuli.

Dzurinda serves on the Leadership Council for Concordia, a nonpartisan, nonprofit based in New York City focused on promoting effective public-private collaboration to create a more prosperous and sustainable future. Dzurinda is a keen marathoner. He has taken part in the International Peace Marathon (MMM) in Košice 13 times, he ran the Lesser Carpathians Marathon (in 1986 in his personal best of 2 hours, 54 minutes and 57 seconds) and in 1996 the Rajec Marathon. In 2001, as Slovakia's prime minister, he took part in the famous New York City Marathon, completing the 42.195-km course in 3 hours, 42 minutes. On 13 April 2003 he ran his second foreign marathon, held in London. He mended his final time at 3 hours 36 minutes. When speaking to the BBC presenter, he aired his hopes for a Slovakia as part of the EU, which occurred in 2004.

Political offices
Preceded by Roman Hofbauer	Minister of Transport, Post and Telecommunications; 1994	Succeeded by Alexander Rezeš
Preceded by Vladimír Mečiar	Prime Minister of Slovakia; 1998–2006	Succeeded by Robert Fico
Preceded by Miroslav Lajčák	Minister of Foreign Affairs; 2010–2012	Succeeded by Miroslav Lajčák
