= Alica Bieliková =

Slovak politician (1942–2022)

Member of the National Council
- In office 3 November 1994 – 29 October 1998

Personal details
- Born: 26 May 1942 Malacky, Slovak Republic
- Died: 19 January 2022 (aged 79)
- Party: Movement for a Democratic Slovakia
- Spouse: Ladislav Bielik
- Children: 2 sons including Peter Bielik
- Education: Comenius University

Alica Bieliková (26 June 1942 – 19 January 2022) was a Slovak politician. She served as a Member of the National Council from 1994 to 1998.

== Early life ==
Bieliková was born in Malacky. She studied journalism at the Comenius University. Following her graduation, she worked for Slovenský rozhlas for 23 years.

== Political career ==
In 1993, Bieliková joined the staff of then president Michal Kováč. In 1994 she was elected to the National Council where she represented the Movement for a Democratic Slovakia. As an MP, she was active in the field of international relations and culture. After the end of her parliamentary mandate, she became a member of staff of president Rudolf Schuster. She left in 2001 and became an aide to the Member of the National Council Marta Aibeková. In 2005, she became the spokeswoman for president Ivan Gašparovič.

== Personal life ==
Bieliková married the photographer Ladislav Bielik in 1968. They had two sons together, including the journalist Peter Bielik.

== Death ==
Bieliková died on 19 January 2022, aged 79, following an undisclosed illness. Her son, a TA3 presenter Peter Bielik, told the News Agency of the Slovak Republic about her death.
