= Anton Neuwirth =

Slovak doctor (1921–2004)

- Born: 1921
- Died: 2004 (aged 82–83)
- Citizenship: Slovak
- Occupations: medical doctor, political prisoner, Member of Parliament, presidential candidate, ambassador
- Years active: 1946-2004

Anton Neuwirth (1921–2004) was a Slovak medical doctor, political prisoner, Member of Parliament, presidential candidate and ambassador.

== Early life, education and family ==
Neuwirth was born on 22 January 1921 in Chalmová, Bystričany. He grew up in Kapušany, Žilina and Bojnice.

From 1939 to 1944 he studied medicine at the Comenius University (Univerzita Komenského) in Bratislava graduating as a medical doctor in 1946. During his studies he became involved with the Croatian priest, Professor Tomislav Kolakovič (1906–1992). This experience framed his social and political engagement against totalitarianism and that the church should have social issues as its priority. From 1945 to 1947 he studied chemistry at the Comenius University (Univerzita Komenského) in Bratislava.

On 10 July 1947 he married Eva Adamkova; together they had four children: Anna Záborská (*1948, living in Bojnice), Katarína Schniererová (*1949, living in Bojnice), František Neuwirth (*1951, living in Dijon, France) and Anton Neuwirth (*1953, living in Cologne, Germany).

== Medical career ==
In 1947 he received a scholarship to work in Zürich with professor Paul Karrer, the 1937 Chemistry Nobel Prize laureate. Back in Slovakia in 1948, he served from 1949 to 1953 as head of the Institute of Medical Chemistry and taught at the Medical Faculty of the Comenius University and from 1949 to 1953 at the University of Veterinary in Košice.

== Catholic Action ==
Because of his activities in Catholic Action, a worldwide group, aiming at enlarging Catholic influence on society, he was arrested on 30 November 1953, accused of "treason and espionage" and condemned to twelve years imprisonment. After six and a half years in the prison in Ilava and in the high-security Leopoldov Prison, he was released on 11 May 1960. He returned to work as a medical doctor in Žilina, Čadca, Martin and Bojnice.

== Velvet revolution, politics, diplomacy and youth education ==
He participated actively in the Velvet Revolution, this non-violent period of upheaval and transition which led to the transition of power in what was then Czechoslovakia.

On 17 February 1990 he participated in the founding congress of the first Christian democratic party in Slovakia, the "Christian Democratic Movement" (Kresťanskodemokratické hnutie, KDH).

From 1992 to 2000 he was President of the Slovak branch of the International Paneuropean Union, the oldest European unification movement, created in 1923 by Count Richard Nikolaus von Coudenhove-Kalergi's, based on the principles of liberalism, Christianity, social responsibility, and pro-Europeanism.

In 1992 he was elected member of the Slovak National Parliament "National Council" (Národná rada Slovenskej republiky), where he became President of the Health Committee.

In January 1993 he ran for Slovak presidency. However, he only received 27 out of 90 needed votes in the first round of the Slovak presidential election in the National Council. In the second ballot, Michal Kováč was elected.

On 29 January 1993 he was elected Honorary President of the Slovak political party "Christian Democratic Movement" (Kresťanskodemokratické hnutie, KDH).

In 1994 he was chosen to represent his country as ambassador at the Vatican (Holy See).

In 1998 he returned to Slovakia and created with Martin Luteran the Ladislav Hanus Fellowship (SLH), a civic association for students, who embrace the vision to actively contribute to understanding and developing Christian faith and culture in Slovakia.

Together with Rudolf Lesňák, he published in 2000 his autobiography "Liečiť zlo láskou" (Healing evil through love).

From 2001 to 2004 he was President of the Confederation of Political Prisoners of Slovakia (Konfederácie politických väzňov Slovenska).

After having visited his daughter Anna Záborská in Strasbourg after her election as Member of the European Parliament, he died five days later on 21 September 2004 in Bojnice, where he was buried in the family grave.

On the fifth anniversary of his death, on 21 September 2009, the Collegium of Anton Neuwirth (CAN) was founded in order to honour his legacy to educate young Christian undergraduates through educational programs.
