= Patrik Jandak =

Slovak photographer (born 1977)

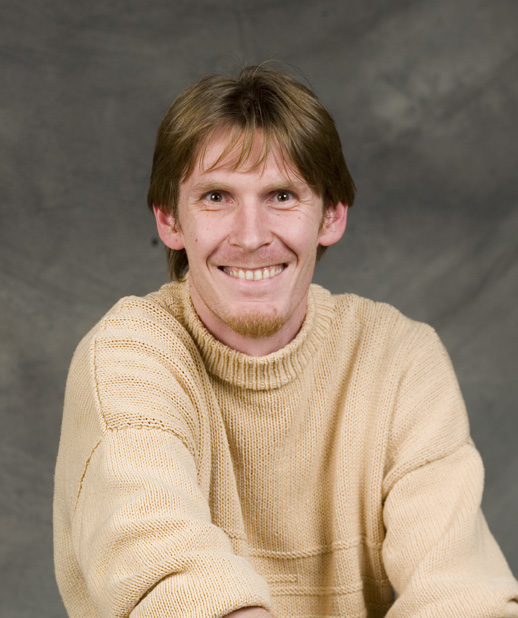
Patrik Jandak

Patrik Jandak (born 1977) is a Slovak photographer. From 2001 to 2004, he worked as the official photographer to President of Slovakia Rudolf Schuster and from 2004 to 2005 as the photographer of Slovak President Ivan Gasparovic. In April 2005, he moved to Canada. Jandak started as a documentary photographer and published two photography books (Focused on President and Pictures from England). Since he moved to Canada his photography shifted to studio and nude photography.

== Early life and education ==
Jandak was born in Malacky Czechoslovakia, the younger of two brothers, to parents Lydia and Stefan Jandak in 1977 in Malacky. Jandak Studied to be Agricultural Engineer at Secondary Agricultural School in Bernolákovo and University of Agricultural in Nitra. After first year at University he went to England where he purchased his first Camera. During his stay in the United Kingdom, he became a member of Windsor Photographic Society. In 1998, he started to study photography in London.

== Career ==
In 2000, he returned to Slovakia and few months later he got a job as a photo lab assistant in Bratislava which eventually led him to the position of the official photographer of the President of Slovakia Rudolf Schuster (from December 2001 to June 2004), and from June 2004 to April 2005 as the photographer of Slovak President Ivan Gasparovic. In April 2005, he moved to Toronto, Canada where he transformed form documentary photographer to studio portrait and fine art nude photographer. In October 2010, he started publishing monthly photography magazine PH magazine.

== Books ==
- Focus on President (PPB Bratislava, 2004)
- Pictures from England (Art Photo, 2005)

== Exhibitions ==
- 2002 Memories of London, MM Gallery, Piestany, Slovakia
- 2003 part in Collective exhibition in Vatican The Holly Father in SLovakia, 3 visits of John Paul II.
- 2006 Group Exhibition in HP Gallery Toronto as part of Contact Mont of Photography.
- 2007 selected to represent Slovakia at EU - Randevu in business trade show in Toronto.
- 2010 Group exhibition during Nuit Blanche in Ben Navaee Gallery, Toronto.
