= Liberal Party (Slovakia) =

- Founded: 2003
- Ideology: Liberalism; Conservatism; Liberal conservatism Populism
- Political position: Centre-right (Presumed)

Liberal Party (Slovak: Liberálna strana, LS) was a political party in Slovakia founded on 28 March 2003 by dissident parliamentarians who split from Vladimír Mečiar's Movement for a Democratic Slovakia (HZDS). The party was founded under the name People's Union (Ľudová únia) and renamed itself to 'Liberal Party' on 26 March 2007. From 2003 to 2006 the party had MPs in the Slovak Parliament (elected on the HZDS ticket), since 2006 the party is extra-parliamentary. LS runs on a conservative and populist platform.

== History ==
The party was founded by 11 Movement for a Democratic Slovakia party MPs: Miroslav Abelovský, Jozef Brhel, Jozef Elsner, Ján Gabriel, Ján Mikolaj, Ivan Kiňo, Gustáv Krajči, Igor Pinkava, Ladislav Polka, Vojtech Tkáč, Rudolf Žiak and numerous prominent ex-HZDS members like Peter Chudík, Peter Tomeček and Oľga Keltošová.

The party was first led by Vojtech Tkáč, before Gustáv Krajči was elected leader in 2004. Krajčí remains the president of the party.

In July 2004, Tkáč resigned from his position of party leader. Oľga Keltošová and other deputy leaders resigned as well, citing their opposition to some party members voting differently in the Parliament than agreed upon inside the party.

== Party leadership ==
- Since founding on 28 March 2003: Vojtech Tkáč (Leader)
- Since the 9 October 2004 Party Congress in Spišská Nová Ves: Gustáv Krajči (Leader), Vladimír Hricko (Deputy for Public Service and Regional Politics), Ján Gabriel (Deputy for Economics)
- Current leadership: Gustáv Krajči (Leader), Peter Kováčik and Miroslav Jevočin and Anton Tanistrák (Deputies), Alexandra Farkašová (General Secretary)

== Elections results ==
The party took part in the European Parliament election in 2004 under the name People's Union (ĽÚ) in coalition with Movement for Democracy (HZD). Together they received 1,69% of votes and therefore no seat in the European Parliament.
