= Marta Aibeková =

Slovak politician

Member of the National Council
- In office 1992–2002

Personal details
- Born: June 22, 1947 (age 78); Trenčín, Czechoslovakia
- Political party: Movement for a Democratic Slovakia (CSL); Movement for Democracy

Marta Aibeková (born June 22, 1947, in Trenčín) is a politician in Slovakia. Aibeková was a member of the National Council of the Slovak Republic for the Movement for a Democratic Slovakia (CSL) during the election period, 1992–1994, 1994-1998 and 1998–2002.

In 2002, together with Ivan Gašparovič they founded the Movement for Democracy and was one of the candidates for this party in the 2006 elections.
