= Zdenko Trebuľa =

Slovak politician

Zdenko Trebuľa (born September 29, 1955, in Martin, Czechoslovakia) was the Mayor of the town of Košice (from 1999 to 2006, while a member of the Party of Civic Understanding), then the President of the Košice Self-governing Region (from January 2006 to December 2017).

He is a former lawyer, attorney. He is married with two children.

Since 2004, Trebuľa has been a member of the political party Direction – Slovak Social Democracy (Smer). From 1979 to 1990 he was a member of the Communist Party of Czechoslovakia (KSČ). From 1999 to 2002 he was a member of the Party of Civic Understanding; and the Social Democratic Alternative from 2002 to 2004.
