= Miroslav Jureňa =

Slovak politician (born 1954)

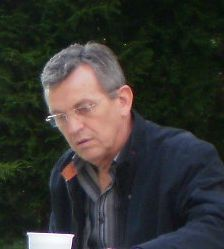

Minister of Agriculture
- In office 4 July 2006 – 27 November 2007
- Prime Minister: Robert Fico
- Preceded by: Zsolt Simon
- Succeeded by: Zdenka Kramplová

Personal details
- Born: 17 June 1954 (age 72) Skalica, Czechoslovakia
- Party: Slovak National Party (since 2011); Movement for a Democratic Slovakia) (1998–2010); Peasants' Party of Slovakia (1993–1998); Communist Party of Czechoslovakia (until 1989)
- Education: Slovak University of Agriculture

Miroslav Jureňa (born 17 June 1954) is a Slovak politician. From 2006 to 2007 he served as the Minister of Agriculture of Slovakia.

== Biography ==
Jureňa was born on 17 June 1954 in Skalica in a farming family. He grew up in Gbely, playing in the local football team. In 1977 he graduated from the Slovak University of Agriculture. Following his graduation until 1990 he was the head of agricultural cooperative in Gbely as well as a member of the town council. Until the Velvet Revolution, he was a member of the Communist Party of Czechoslovakia. After the privatization of the agricultural cooperatives in Slovakia, Jureňa became an agricultural manager in the private sector.

=== Political career ===
Following the independence of Slovakia, Jureňa became active in the Peasants' Party of Slovakia, a junior ally of the ruling Movement for a Democratic Slovakia (HZDS). In 1998 the Peasants' Party merged into the HZDS. Jureňa's position within the party strengthened in 2005, when Miroslav Maxon, the chief agriculture expert of the party, left over disagreements with the party leadership. Maxon's departure allowed Jureňa to take his place and became the party's leading agriculture expert and, following the 2006 Slovak parliamentary election, the Minister of Agriculture.

In November 2007, Jureňa was asked by the Prime Minister Robert Fico to resign over corruption allegations. Jureňa organized his final press conference in a cowshed in Vajnory. He justified the choice of venue by the example of Jesus Christ, who was famously born in the manger. Building up on the Biblical theme, he compared Fico to the Pharisee from the Gospel of Luke. The press conference primarily focused on Jureňa listing corruption allegations against other cabinet members and questioning why they weren't punished when he was.

Following his dismissal from the government, Jureňa served as a Deputy of the National Council of Slovakia until 2010. Following the failure of HZDS to reach the representation threshold in the 2010 Slovak parliamentary election, Jureňa left HZDS and joined the Slovak National Party (SNS).

In 2024, Jureňa became the head of campaign of Štefan Harabin for the 2004 Slovak presidential election. Following the elimination of Harabin in the first round, Jureňa issued a press release supporting Peter Pellegrini in the runoff. Immediately after the information became public, Harabin denied supporting Pellegrini. According to Harabin, Jureňa acted on his own and was fired as a result of issuing an incorrect statement.

== Personal life ==
Jureňa is married with one daughter.
