= Vladimír Palko =

Slovak politician and former interior minister

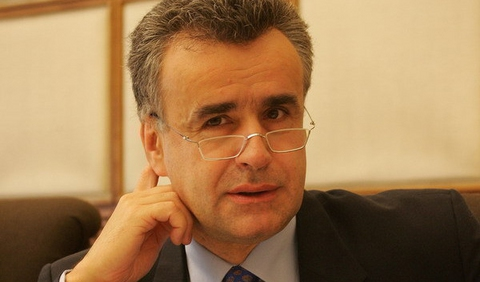

Member of the National Council of the Slovak Republic Slovak National Council until 31 December 1992
- In office 7 February 2006 – 12 June 2010
- In office 30 October 1998 – 15 October 2002

Interior Minister of Slovakia
- In office 15 October 2002 – 7 February 2006
- Preceded by: Ivan Šimko
- Succeeded by: Martin Pado

Personal details
- Born: 20 May 1957 (age 68) Čuňovo, Czechoslovakia
- Party: Conservative Democrats of Slovakia
- Spouse: Viera Palková
- Children: 3
- Education: Comenius University
- Occupation: mathematician, university professor

Vladimír Palko (born 20 May 1957 in Čuňovo) is a Slovak politician. He is a member of the National Council of the Slovak Republic and former interior minister of Slovakia. On 12 March 2008 he established a new party called Conservative Democrats of Slovakia after he left Christian Democratic Movement in February 2008, due to his skepticism and disappointment about leadership of Pavol Hrušovský. This political party was dissolved in 2014.

He is married and has three children. His son Vladimír Jr. is a historian who has worked at the National Memory Institute. Another son, Andrej, is an actor and a member of the Drama Ensemble of the State Theatre Košice. He also has a daughter, Viera.

== Early career ==
In 1981, Vladimír Palko graduated from the Faculty of Mathematics and Physics of Comenius University in Bratislava, and in 1987 he obtained the degree of Candidate of Sciences. Between 1981 and 1990, he worked as an assistant professor at the Department of Mathematics at the Faculty of Electrical Engineering of the Slovak University of Technology in Bratislava, and as a researcher at the Institute of Technical Cybernetics of the Slovak Academy of Sciences.

From 1991 to 1996, he served as an assistant professor at the Department of Mathematics of the Faculty of Electrical Engineering and Information Technology of the Slovak University of Technology. He obtained the academic title of Associate Professor (Docent) in mathematics in 1996.

== Political career ==
From 1991 to 1992, he served as Deputy Director of the Federal Security Information Service.

=== Christian Democratic Movement ===
Vladimír Palko has been a founding member of the Christian Democratic Movement (KDH) in 1989.

From November 1996 to July 1998, he was active in KDH as vice-chairman of the party. In July 1998, he became a member of the Slovak Democratic Coalition (SDK) and was elected as a Member of the National Council.

He renewed his membership in KDH on 15 January 1999. in April he became KDH Vice-Chairman for Press and External Relations and he was reconfirmed in this position several times. In the 2002 parliamentary elections, he was elected as a Member of Parliament for KDH.

In July 2006, after ten years, he resigned from his position in the KDH presidium. This step was a reaction to his disagreement with the election of the chair of the KDH parliamentary group following the parliamentary elections. At that time, at a party congress in Senec, KDH voted in favor of possible coalition cooperation with SMER, which Vladimír Palko and others opposed. SMER, however, subsequently formed a coalition with HZDS and SNS and KDH moved into opposition.

In June 2007, Vladimír Palko ran for chairman of KDH but the congress confirmed Pavol Hrušovský in a secret ballot.

Ultimately, on 21 February 2008, he left the party, together with František Mikloško, Pavol Minárik, and Rudolf Bauer, with the intention of founding a new political party.

=== Conservative Democrats of Slovakia ===
The new political party Conservative Democrats of Slovakia (KDS) was registered with the Ministry of the Interior on 22 July 2008 and Vladimír Palko became its first chairman.

In the 2009 European Parliament elections he was the lead candidate on the KDS–OKS coalition list. This coalition also signed a cooperation agreement with Declan Ganley’s pan-European Eurosceptic movement Libertas in Bratislava on 15 May 2009. Libertas supported the KDS–OKS candidates in the elections to the European Parliament.

However, the coalition received only 2.1% of the vote and won no seats. KDS did not contest the 2010 parliamentary elections, citing the party’s financial problems. In 2014, the party was dissolved following Rudolf Bauer’s failure in the Košice mayoral elections.

=== Post-Political Career ===
After leaving politics, Palko has been primarily engaged in writing and journalism.

From 2010 to 2020, he contributed to the conservative magazine Postoj and from 2021, until his departure in 2025, he was an commentator at Štandard magazine. In 2025, together with former editors of Štandard, he co-founded the media outlet Marker, where he works as a commentator.
