= Pavol Hamžík =

Slovak diplomat

Deputy Prime Minister of Slovakia
- In office 30 October 1998 – May 2001

5th Foreign Minister of Slovakia
- In office 27 August 1996 – 25 May 1997
- Prime Minister: Vladimír Mečiar
- Preceded by: Juraj Schenk
- Succeeded by: Zdenka Kramplová

Personal details
- Born: 20 August 1954 (age 71) Trenčín, Czechoslovakia
- Party: Party of Civic Understanding; Direction – Social Democracy

Pavol Hamžík (born 20 August 1954) is a former Foreign Minister of Slovakia from 1996 to 1997 in cabinet of Vladimír Mečiar and also member of government of prime minister Mikuláš Dzurinda. He is currently the foreign policy advisor of Robert Fico.

He studied law at Comenius University in Bratislava, finished in 1978. Hamžík also studied diplomacy in Moscow (1989–1991).

Since May 2009 he has been the Slovak ambassador in Ukraine.
