= Juraj Schenk =

Slovak politician (born 1948)

4th Foreign Minister of Slovakia
- In office December 13, 1994 – August 27, 1996
- Prime Minister: Vladimír Mečiar
- Preceded by: Eduard Kukan
- Succeeded by: Pavol Hamžík

Personal details
- Born: May 6, 1948 (age 77) Bratislava, Czechoslovakia
- Party: HZDS

Juraj Schenk (born May 6, 1948) is former Foreign Minister of Slovakia from 1994 to 1996 in cabinet of Vladimír Mečiar.

Schenk studied sociology at the Univezita Komenského, Bratislava and is working there since 1972. In 1994 he became a professor of sociology and is teaching there until now.

His main professional interests include sociological methodology, self-organisation of social systems (synergetics, chaos theory), causal modelling, construction of sociological theories and empirical research.

His current research activities concern with Alexander Hirner's methodological conception, scaling in sociological research, chaos theory and empirical research.
