= Zdenka Kramplová =

Slovak politician (born 1957)

Member of the National Council of the Slovak Republic
- Incumbent
- Assumed office 18 August 2008
- In office 4 July 2006 – 27 November 2007

Minister of Agriculture of Slovakia
- In office 27 November 2007 – 18 August 2008
- Preceded by: Miroslav Jureňa
- Succeeded by: Stanislav Becík

6th Foreign Minister of Slovakia
- In office 25 May 1997 – 30 October 1998
- Prime Minister: Vladimír Mečiar
- Preceded by: Pavol Hamžík
- Succeeded by: Eduard Kukan

Personal details
- Born: 7 August 1957 (age 68) Krupina, Czechoslovakia
- Party: People's Party – Movement for a Democratic Slovakia
- Spouse: František Krampl

Zdenka Kramplová (born 7 August 1957) was Minister of agriculture of Slovakia from 27 November 2007 until 18 August 2008 and former Foreign Minister of Slovakia from 1997 to 1998. She is a former member of the People's Party – Movement for a Democratic Slovakia.
Mrs. Kramplová studied agriculture in Plovdiv, Bulgaria (1976–1981).
