= Mikloško =

Mikloško (feminine Miklošková) is a Slovak surname. Notable people with the surname include:

- František Mikloško (born 1947), Slovak politician
- Luděk Mikloško (1961–2026), Czech football player and coach
