= 1993 Slovak presidential election =

1993 Slovak Presidential election
- 26 January to 15 February 1993
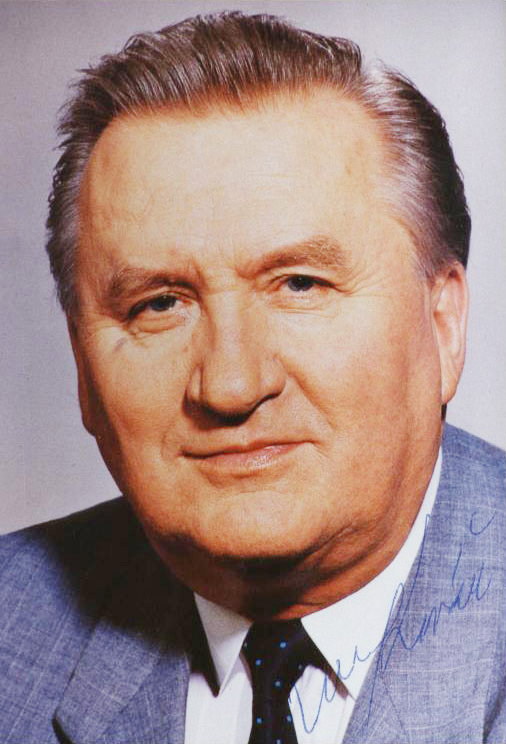
Nominee	Michal Kováč
Party	ĽS–HZDS
Electoral vote	106
Percentage	73%
Elected President
Michal Kováč

The 1993 Slovak presidential elections were held between 26 January and 15 February 1993. Michal Kováč was elected as the first president of Slovakia and became the only Slovak president elected by Parliament. A candidate needed to receive 90 votes to be elected.

== Results ==
=== First Ballot ===
Candidate	Party	First round (26 January)		Second round (27 January)	
Candidate	Party	Votes	%	Votes	%
Roman Kováč	People's Party – Movement for a Democratic Slovakia	69	48.25	78	52
Milan Ftáčnik	Party of the Democratic Left	30	20.97	31	28.44
Anton Neuwirth	Christian Democratic Movement	27	18.88		
Jozef Prokeš	Slovak National Party	17	11.88		
Total		143	100	109	100

=== Second Ballot ===
15 February
Candidate	Party	Votes	%
Michal Kováč	People's Party – Movement for a Democratic Slovakia	106	73.1
Against		19	13.1
Blank ballots		20	13.8
Total		106	100
