= Jozef Migaš =

Slovak politician

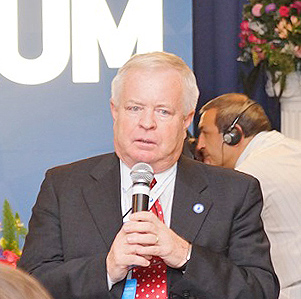

Acting President of Slovakia
- In office 30 October 1998 – 15 June 1999 Serving with Mikuláš Dzurinda
- Prime Minister: Mikuláš Dzurinda
- Preceded by: Ivan Gašparovič (acting); Vladimir Meciar (acting)

Speaker of the National Council
- In office 30 October 1998 – 15 October 2002
- Preceded by: Ivan Gašparovič
- Succeeded by: Pavol Hrušovský

Ambassador to Ukraine
- In office 1995–1996

Ambassador to Belarus
- In office 2 February 2016 – 13 May 2020

Personal details
- Born: 7 January 1954 (age 72) Pušovce, Czechoslovakia
- Party: Direction-Social Democracy (SMER-SD)
- Other political affiliations: Party of the Democratic Left, Communist Party of Slovakia (1939)

Jozef Migaš (born 7 January 1954) is a Slovak politician who was Speaker of National Council of the Slovak Republic from 1998 to 2002, during the government of Mikuláš Dzurinda. He is now in political retirement. He was also acting president in 1998 and 1999.

== Early life and career ==
From 1973 to 1978 he studied at the Faculty of Philosophy at the Taras Shevchenko National University of Kyiv. In 1982, he graduated with a Ph.D. Until 1989, he worked as an assistant professor at the Higher Political School of the Central Committee Communist Party of Slovakia in Bratislava, working in party structures at the Slovak Academy of Sciences in Košice. In 1989, he became one of the founders of the Democratic Left Party, being a member of the party's executive committee. In 1993, he switched to diplomatic work, being an adviser to the Embassy of the Slovak Republic in Kyiv. In 1995 and 1996, he served as Ambassador Extraordinary and Plenipotentiary of Slovakia to Ukraine.

== National politics ==
From 1996 to 2001, he was Chairman of the Democratic Left Party. During this time, he was Chairman Parliament of Slovakia (1998–2002). From 30 October 1998 to 15 June 1999, he was the Acting President of Slovakia, serving after the completion of the presidency of Michal Kováč and the political crisis lasting more than a year. In 2003, he completed an internship in foreign policy and improving English in the United States at the American Language Communication Center.

== Return to the diplomatic service ==
He was engaged in entrepreneurial activity in the 2000s before going back to the diplomatic sphere in 2009 to become the Ambassador of Slovakia in Russia, a position he served in until 2014. On 2 February 2016, he was appointed to the post of ambassador to Belarus.

=== Victory Day and dismissal ===
One of the attendees of the 2020 Minsk Victory Day Parade was Migaš, being one of the few foreign ambassadors in attendance. On 13 May 2020, he resigned as ambassador after attending the celebrations as he was one of the two European Union ambassadors (the other being the Hungarian ambassador) who did not inform the Ministry of Foreign Affairs of their home countries. The Slovak foreign ministry in fact learned about his participation from the local press. He made his explanation one of principled stance, simply stating that he is the "son of a partisan and anti-fascist". In a meeting with Serbian ambassador Veljko Kovacevic on 28 May, President Alexander Lukashenko criticized the Slovak government on the move, saying that "frankly speaking, I do not fully understand the position of the official Slovak leadership which allegedly criticized his action". A day after those comments were made the Slovak Foreign Ministry summoned the Belarusian ambassador, saying that Lukashenko's comments on the Slovak position were "disengaged from the truth". Migaš would later be awarded the Order of Francysk Skaryna by President Lukashenko.

== Personal life ==
He speaks several foreign languages outside the Slovak language: English, Russian, Ukrainian. He owns 35 hectares of land in his home town. Upon leaving Belarus for the final time as ambassador, he took a German Shepherd dog which was gifted to him by the Border Guard Service of Belarus.

== Awards ==
- Russia – Order of Friendship (28 October 2014)
- Belarus – Order of Francysk Skaryna (15 June 2020)

Political offices
Preceded by Vladimír Mečiar; Acting	President of Slovakia; Acting; 1998–1999; Served alongside: Mikuláš Dzurinda (Acting)	Succeeded by Rudolf Schuster
