= Pavol Minárik =

Slovak politician (1957–2018)

Member of the National Council
- In office 15 October 2002 – 8 July 2010

Personal details
- Born: 25 June 1957 Bratislava, Czechoslovakia
- Died: 10 March 2018 (aged 60) Bratislava, Slovakia
- Party: Christian Democratic Movement (1990–2008); Conservative Democrats of Slovakia (2008–2014)
- Spouse: Mária Mináriková
- Children: 3
- Education: Comenius University

Pavol Minárik (25 June 1957 – 10 March 2018) was a Slovak politician. From 2002 to 2010 he served as a member of the National Council of Slovakia.

== Biography ==
Pavol Minárik was born on 25 June 1957 in Bratislava. He studied systems theory at Comenius University. After graduation he worked as a programmer for the public veterinary authority institution, later in the National Centre for Informatics of Slovakia.

=== Political career ===
Following the Velvet Revolution and Slovakia's transition to democracy, Minárik entered local politics. He first served as a councilor for the Petržalka borough (1990–1994) before moving to the Bratislava City Council in 1994. During this period, he also held the post of Deputy Mayor of Petržalka. Between 1999 and 2002, he rose to the position of Deputy Mayor of Bratislava. A member of the Christian Democratic Movement (KDH) since 1990, Minárik was appointed the party's Deputy Chairman for Regional Development in 1999.

Minárik was elected to the National Council in 2002 and won re-election in 2006. However, shortly after the 2006 election, he became embroiled in an internal KDH conflict. Minárik, as part of the party's conservative wing, refused to support a majority decision by KDH leadership to form a coalition government with the Direction – Social Democracy (SMER) party. Although the dissenting members initially downplayed the likelihood of a formal party split, on February 21, 2008, Minárik announced his departure from the KDH alongside high-profile colleagues Vladimír Palko, Rudolf Bauer, and František Mikloško. The group cited long-standing ideological disagreements with the party leadership as the primary reason for their exit. Shortly thereafter, they co-founded the Conservative Democrats of Slovakia (KDS). In 2009, Minárik was among KDS candidates running on the Eurosceptic Libertas.eu platform for the 2009 European Parliament election, but failed to win a seat. The following years he lost his National Council seat as KDH did not run in the national election.

== Personal life and death ==
Minárik and his wife Mária had a daughter and two sons together.

In late January 2018, Minárik was severely injured and fell into a coma for several weeks after being struck by a car in Petržalka. Pavol Minárik died from his injuries on 10 March 2018, at the age of 60.
