= Conservative Democrats of Slovakia =

Defunct Slovak political party

Conservative Democrats of Slovakia Konzervatívni demokrati Slovenska
- Leader: Vladimír Palko
- Founded: 2008
- Dissolved: 2014
- Split from: Christian Democratic Movement
- Headquarters: Bratislava
- Membership (2013): 50
- Ideology: National conservatism Conservatism; Euroscepticism; Christian democracy
- Political position: Centre-right to right-wing
- Colours: Purple

Website
- www.kdsonline.sk

The Conservative Democrats of Slovakia (Slovak: Konzervatívni demokrati Slovenska, KDS) is a defunct Slovak political party established by four MPs (František Mikloško, Vladimír Palko, Rudolf Bauer and Pavol Minárik) who belonged to the Christian Democratic Movement, but left it on 21 February 2008 over disagreements with the party leader.

Members of the preparatory committee of KDS were Vladimír Palko, František Mikloško, Vladimír Pčolinský, Pavol Minárik, Rudolf Bauer and the press spokesman of the planned party was Jaroslav Daniška.

The party was established in July 2008. Vladimír Palko became its chairman.

In 2014, the party was dissolved following Rudolf Bauer’s failure in the Košice mayoral elections.

== Electoral history ==
=== 2009 European Parliament elections ===
In the 2009 European Parliament elections KDS formed a coalition with Civic Conservative Party (OKS). KDS-OKS coalition signed a cooperation agreement with Declan Ganley’s pan-European Eurosceptic movement Libertas in Bratislava on 15 May 2009. Libertas supported the KDS–OKS candidates in the elections to the European Parliament. Lead candidate of coalition list was Vladimír Palko.

The coalition received only 2.1% of the vote and won no seats.

=== 2009 Presidential elections ===
KDS announced that František Mikloško would contest the 2009 presidential election. Mikloško received 5.41% of the vote.

=== 2010 Parliamentary elections ===
KDS did not contest the 2010 parliamentary elections, citing the party’s financial problems.

=== 2014 European Parliament elections ===
In the 2014 European Parliament elections, KDS ran in a three-party coalition with the parties NOVA and the Civic Conservative Party (OKS). The coalition received 6,83% of the vote and won one seat.
