= Jandák =

Jandák (feminine: Jandáková) is a Czech surname. Jandak (feminine: Jandaková) is a Slovak surname. They are derived from the given name Jan. Notable people with the surname include:

- Patrik Jandak (born 1977), Slovak photographer
- Vítězslav Jandák (born 1947), Czech actor and politician

== See also ==
- Jandaq
