= 1999 Slovak presidential election =

- 15 May 1999 (first round); 29 May 1999 (second round)
- Turnout: 73.89% (first round); 75.45% (second round)
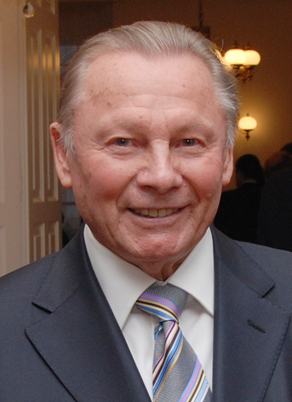

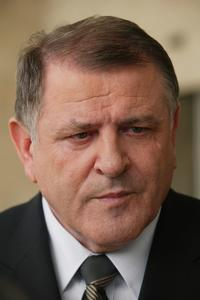
Nominee	Rudolf Schuster	Vladimír Mečiar
Party	SOP	HZDS
Popular vote	1,727,481	1,293,642
Percentage	57.18%	42.82%
President before election
Mikuláš Dzurinda (acting)
Elected President
Rudolf Schuster

Presidential elections were held in Slovakia on 15 May 1999, with a second round on 29 May. Following a constitutional amendment in 1998 that introduced direct presidential elections for the first time, they resulted in a victory for Rudolf Schuster, who received 57% of the vote in the run-off.

== Results ==
Candidate	Party	First round		Second round	
Candidate	Party	Votes	%	Votes	%
Rudolf Schuster	Party of Civic Understanding	1,396,950	47.38	1,727,481	57.18
Vladimír Mečiar	Movement for a Democratic Slovakia	1,097,956	37.24	1,293,642	42.82
Magdaléna Vášáryová	Independent	194,635	6.60		
Ivan Mjartan	Independent	105,903	3.59		
Ján Slota	Slovak National Party	73,836	2.50		
Boris Zala	Independent	29,697	1.01		
Juraj Švec	Independent	24,077	0.82		
Juraj Lazarčík	Independent	15,386	0.52		
Michal Kováč (Note: Withdrew from the election, but remained on the ballot paper)	Independent	5,425	0.18		
Ján Demikát	Slovak National Alternative	4,537	0.15		
Total		2,948,402	100.00	3,021,123	100.00
Valid votes		2,948,402	98.79	3,021,123	99.08
Invalid/blank votes		36,022	1.21	28,098	0.92
Total votes		2,984,424	100.00	3,049,221	100.00
Registered voters/turnout		4,038,899	73.89	4,041,181	75.45
Source: Nohlen & Stöver
