= Branislav Obžera =

Slovak footballer

Personal information
- Date of birth: 29 August 1981 (age 45)
- Place of birth: Bystričany, Czechoslovakia
- Height: 1.75 m (5 ft 9 in)
- Position: Winger

Senior career*
Years	Team	Apps	(Gls)
1999–2000	Baník Prievidza	25	(0)
2000–2001	FK Dukla Banská Bystrica		
2001–2004	Slovan Bratislava	62	(8)
2005–2006	FC Artmedia Bratislava	24	(3)
2006	FC Saturn Moscow Oblast	14	(2)
2007–2008	FC Artmedia Bratislava	42	(7)
2008–2012	Slovan Bratislava	24	(4)
2012–2013	→ Dunajská Streda	21	(3)
2014–2015	SV Bad Ischl	?	(?)
2015	FC Slovan Liberec	0	(0)
2015–2016	Baník Prievidza	?	(?)

International career
2007–2009	Slovakia	6	(0)
- * Club domestic league appearances and goals

Branislav Obžera (born 29 August 1981) is a Slovak former football midfielder.

== Club career ==
Obžera previously played for Baník Prievidza and FC Artmedia Bratislava in the Slovak Superliga and for FC Saturn Moscow Oblast in the Russian Premier League.

== International career ==
Obžera earned his first call-up for the Slovakia national football team in September 2007.

== Honours ==
- Slovak Superliga (3):
  - 2005, 2008, 2009
