= Eduard Kukan =

Slovak politician (1939–2022)

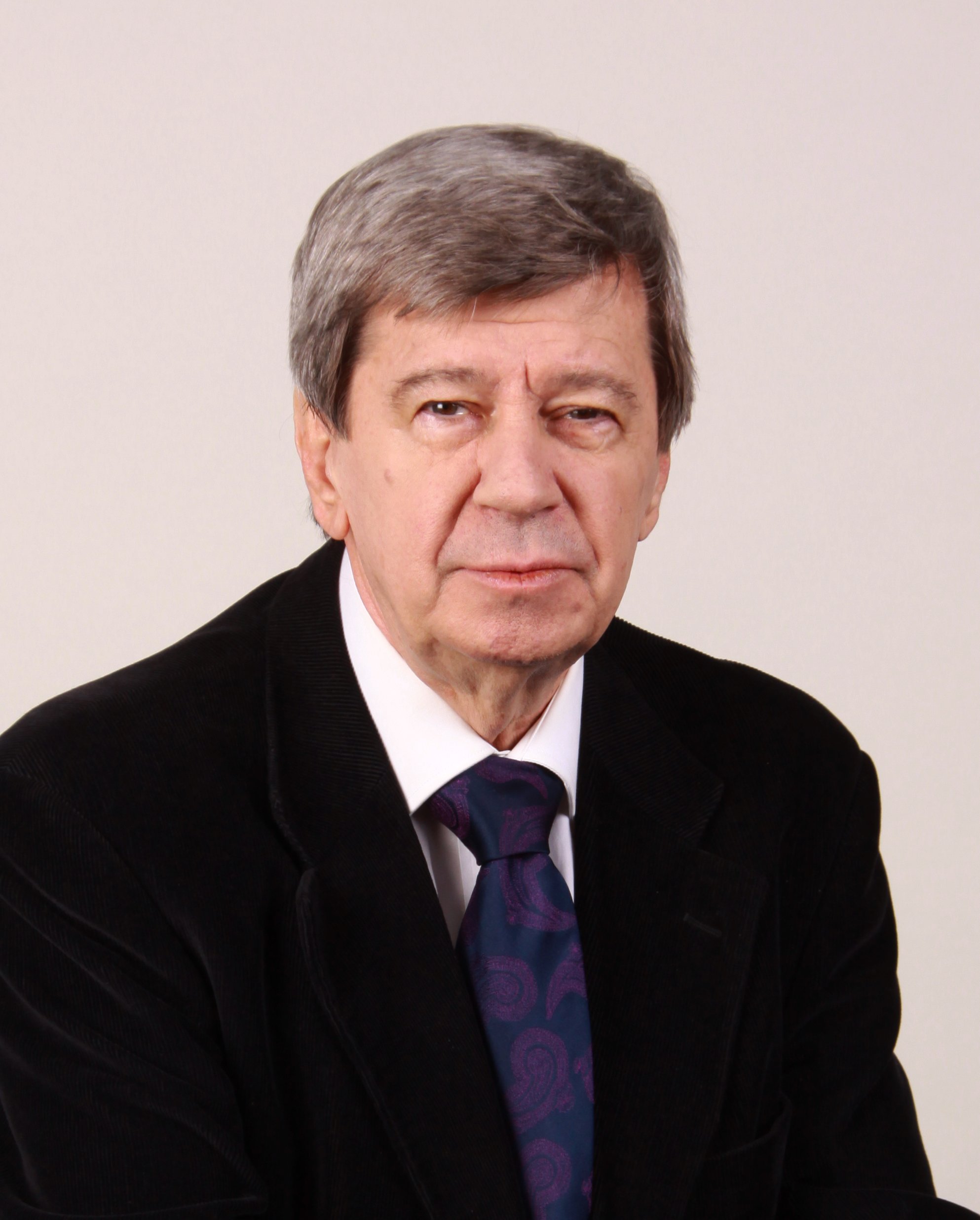
- Kukan in 2014

Member of the European Parliament from Slovakia
- In office 14 July 2009 – 2 July 2019

Member of the National Council of the Slovak Republic
- In office 4 July 2006 – 14 July 2009
- In office 13 December 1994 – 30 October 1998

Minister of Foreign Affairs
- In office 30 October 1998 – 4 July 2006
- Prime Minister: Mikuláš Dzurinda
- Preceded by: Zdenka Kramplová
- Succeeded by: Ján Kubiš
- In office 16 March 1994 – 13 December 1994
- Prime Minister: Jozef Moravčík
- Preceded by: Jozef Moravčík
- Succeeded by: Juraj Schenk

Slovak ambassador to United Nations
- In office 1993–1993

Czechoslovak ambassador to United Nations
- In office 1990 – 31 December 1992

Personal details
- Born: 26 December 1939 Tornóc, Hungary
- Died: 10 February 2022 (aged 82) Bratislava, Slovakia
- Party: SDKÚ-DS (2000–2016); Democratic Union (1995–2000)
- Spouse: Zdenka Kukanová

Eduard Kukan (26 December 1939 – 10 February 2022) was a Slovak politician who served as Minister of Foreign Affairs from 1998 to 2006. He was a candidate in the presidential election held on 3 April 2004, and although pre-election polls had suggested he would come first, he actually came in third behind the eventual President Ivan Gašparovič and former prime minister Vladimír Mečiar, thus preventing him from contesting the run-off. He was elected Member of the European Parliament (MEP) in 2009, a position he held until 2019.

In 1999, Kukan was appointed United Nations Special Envoy on Kosovo by UN Secretary General Kofi Annan, a role he held alongside Carl Bildt.

== Early life and education ==
Kukan was born on 26 December 1939 in Tornóc, Hungary (now Trnovec nad Váhom, Slovakia). He graduated from The Moscow State Institute of International Relations in 1964, where he also gained a strong knowledge of the Swahili language. After graduation he received a Doctorate in Law from the Faculty of Law of the Charles University in Prague.

== Diplomatic career ==
Since then his employments have included:

- Ministry of Foreign Affairs of Czechoslovakia in Prague (began on 1 August 1964)
  - Headquarters in the Department of Sub-Saharan Africa (1964–1968)
  - Secretariat of the Minister (1973–1977)
  - Director of the Department of Sub-Saharan Africa (1981–1985)
  - Director of the Department of Latin America (1988–1990)
- Czechoslovak Embassy in Lusaka (1968–1973)
- Czechoslovak Embassy in Washington as Minister-Counsellor and Deputy Ambassador (1977–1981)
- Czechoslovak Embassy in Addis Ababa as Ambassador (1985–1988)
- Permanent Representative of Czechoslovakia to the United Nations in New York (1991)
- Permanent Representative of Slovakia to the UN (1993)
  - UN Chairman of the Committee for Social, Humanitarian, and Cultural Affairs
  - Special Envoy for the Balkans (1991–2001)
- Minister of Foreign Affairs of Slovakia (March 1994 – December 1994)
- Minister of Foreign Affairs of Slovakia (October 1998 – 2006)
- Special Envoy for the Balkans (1991–2001)

== Member of the European Parliament, 2009–2019 ==
Kukan has been a Member of the European Parliament since the 2009 European elections. In the election campaign, he led the list of candidates of the centre-right Slovak Democratic and Christian Union (SDKÚ).

Kukan has since been serving on the Committee on Foreign Affairs. In addition, he was a member of the Subcommittee on Human Rights between 2009 and 2014. In 2014, he moved to the Subcommittee on Security and Defence.

In 2010, Kukan joined the Friends of the EEAS, an unofficial and independent pressure group formed because of concerns that the High Representative of the Union for Foreign Affairs and Security Policy Catherine Ashton was not paying sufficient attention to the Parliament and was sharing too little information on the formation of the European External Action Service.

Kukan led the parliament's monitoring mission during the Ugandan general elections in 2016.

== Other activities ==
- Global Panel Foundation, Member of the Board of Advisors
- He was a teacher at the Comenius University in Bratislava, Faculty of Law, Department of International Law and International Relations.

== Personal life and death ==
Kukan was married and had two adult children. In addition to his native tongue and Swahili, he spoke English, Russian, and Spanish. In 1993, he was awarded an honorary law degree by the Upsala College in New Jersey.

He died from a heart attack in Bratislava on 9 February 2022, at the age of 82.
