= František Mikloško =

Slovak politician

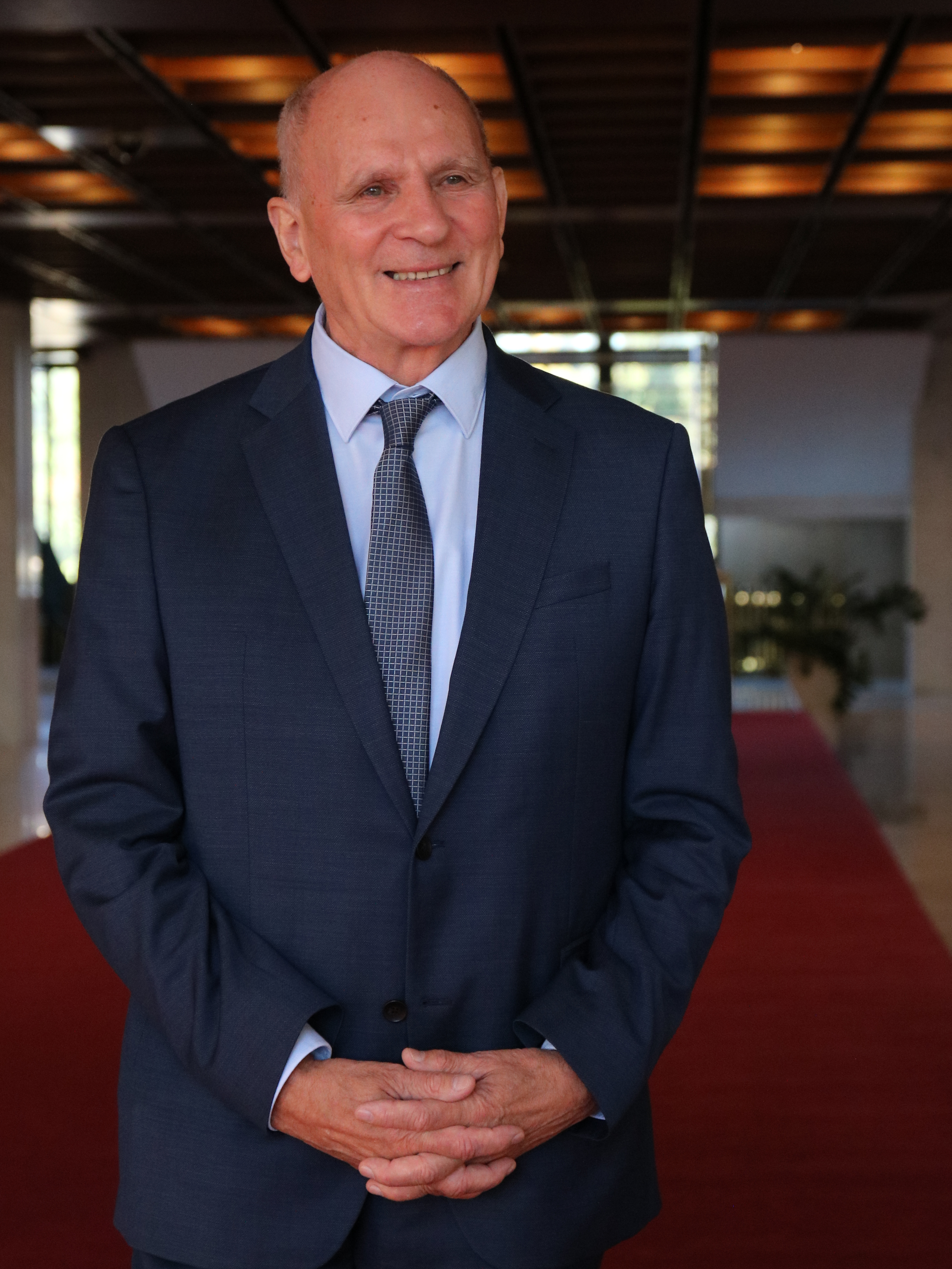

Member of the National Council of the Slovak Republic Slovak National Council until December 31, 2004
- Incumbent
- Assumed office 25 October 2023
- In office 1 March 1990 – 12 June 2010

Speaker of Slovak National Council
- In office 26 June 1990 – 23 June 1992
- Preceded by: Rudolf Schuster
- Succeeded by: Ivan Gašparovič

Personal details
- Born: 2 June 1947 (age 79) Nitra, Czechoslovakia
- Party: VPN (1989–1992); KDH (1992–2008); KDS (2008–2014); KDH (2023–present)
- Spouse: Jana Sasínová
- Education: Univerzita Komenského, Bratislava
- Occupation: Mathematician

František Mikloško (born 2 June 1947) is a Slovak politician. He was the Speaker of the Slovak National Council from 1990 to 1992 and a long serving MP of the National Council of the Slovak Republic (1990-2010). For most of his career, he was a member of Christian Democratic Movement.

== Early life ==
Mikloško studied Mathematics at the Comenius University, graduating in 1966. Already as a student, he was active in the activities of the Catholic Church, which had a complicated relationship with the Communist regime at the time. At first, Mikloško's activities were limited to low profile organization of small student gatherings while working as a researcher at the Slovak Academy of Sciences. However, since 1980s, Mikloško started gradually to contribute to organization of large religious pilgrimages, which has attracted the attention of the Communist regime. In 1983 he was fired from the Academy and could only work in manual occupations. In spite of the regime repression, Mikloško continued to organize increasingly anti-regime rallies, most prominently the Candle demonstration in Bratislava in 1988. After the Velvet Revolution, he became the first Speaker of the Slovak National Council.

== Political career ==
Mikloško was one of the longest-serving members of parliament in Slovakia. He was also a candidate in the 2004 presidential election and the 2009 presidential election. Mikloško did not participate in 2010 parliament election and retired from politics.

On 12 March 2008 František Mikloško, together with Vladimír Palko, Pavol Minárik, and Rudolf Bauer, established a new party called Conservative Democrats of Slovakia which was dissolved in 2014.

After 15 years, Mikloško returned to run for KDH ahead of 2023 parliamentary election.
