= Košice Self-governing Region =

Coordinates: 48°43′0″N 21°15′0″E

Coat of arms of the Košice Self-governing Region

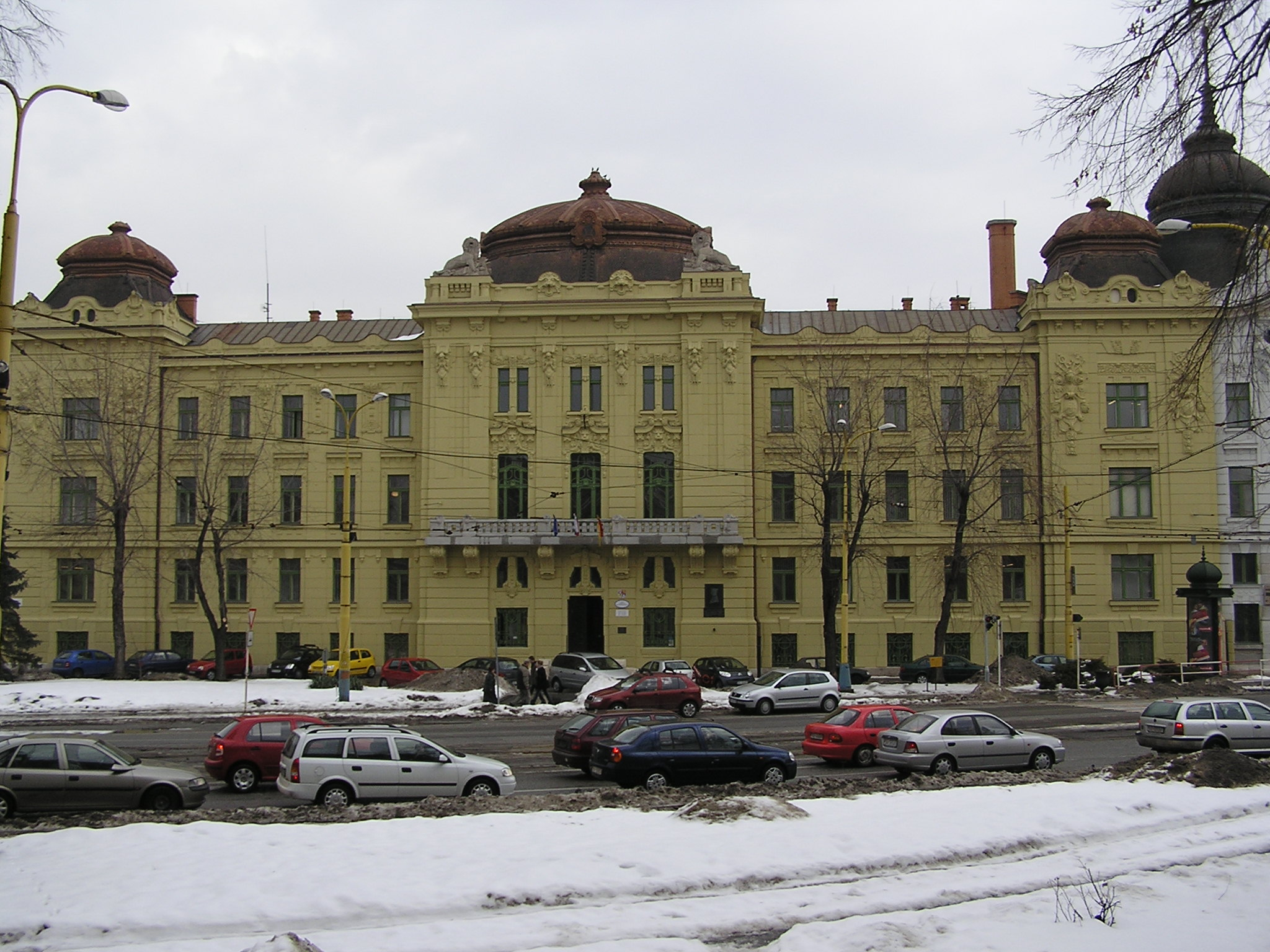
The seat of the Košice Self-governing Region

The Košice Self-governing Region (Slovak: Košický samosprávny kraj, KSK) or the Košice Higher Territorial Unit (Slovak: Košický vyšší územný celok, KVÚC) is one of Slovakia's eight "self-governing regions" whose territory is identical with that of the administrative Košice Region.

The establishing session of the first Council of the Košice Self-governing Region was held on December 19, 2001, in the historical hall of former Župný dom (County House, today's East Slovak Gallery building) with the participation of 57 deputies elected in the first regional elections for the second level of self-government in Slovakia. Rudolf Bauer (a Christian democrat) in 2001 was elected as the first president of the Košice Self-governing Region. His successor was Zdenko Trebuľa (a social democrat) elected for the president of the Košice Self-governing Region on December 10, 2005. He was inaugurated on January 9, 2006.

His successor is the current president Rastislav Trnka, elected in 2017 at 33, is the youngest regional president. Trnka ran as an independent with the support of various centre-right parties, the KDH, SaS, OĽaNO, NOVA, and ŠANCA, defeating his opponent, Richard Raši (Voice – Social Democracy).

The seat of the Košice Self-governing Region is a former military headquarters building (generally known as The Division) on the eastern part of the Námestie Maratónu mieru (Peace Marathon Square) in Košice. It was completed in 1908 as the largest and the most modern building in the town at that time.
