= Party of Civic Understanding =

Party of Civic Understanding Strana občianskeho porozumenia
- Leader: Pavol Hamžík (last)
- Founder: Rudolf Schuster
- Founded: 19 February 1998
- Dissolved: 1 March 2003
- Merged into: Direction (Third Way)
- Ideology: Social democracy Social liberalism Populism
- Political position: Centre-left

The Party of Civic Understanding (Slovak: Strana občianskeho porozumenia, SOP) was a centre-left political party in Slovakia between 1998 and 2003. Between 1998 and 2002 the party was part of the coalition government led by Mikuláš Dzurinda, with the founder of the party, Rudolf Schuster, being elected President of Slovakia in 1999.

In government the party lost support and after the 2002 election had no seats in parliament. The party dissolved on the 1 March 2003 and recommended its members join Direction – Social Democracy (SMER).

== Foundation and 1998 election ==
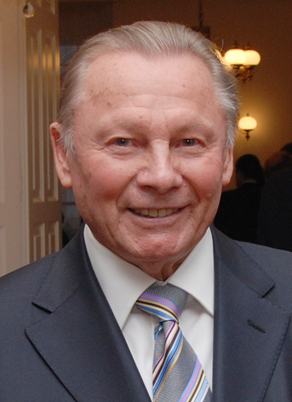
Rudolf Schuster, founder and first leader of the Party of Civic Understanding

The Party of Civic Understanding was founded in February 1998 by the Mayor of Košice, Rudolf Schuster. Members of the new party included the former Foreign Minister Pavol Hamžík, among other prominent Slovak figures. The new party was aided by favourable publicity from the Markíza television station.

The Party of Civic Understanding aimed for left leaning voters from eastern Slovakia and disillusioned supporters of the governing People's Party – Movement for a Democratic Slovakia (HZDS). The party called for pensioners and students to get a better standard of living, but did not call for privatisations to be re-done without conditions, thereby getting some support from businessmen. It was also a strong supporter of membership of the European Union and NATO.

The party's aim initially was to reduce the polarisation of Slovak politics, by promoting reconciliation between the government of Vladimír Mečiar and the opposition. However, as the European Union was completely opposed to the HZDS of Vladimír Mečiar, the Party of Civic Understanding refused to consider co-operating with the HZDS in government. Instead the Party of Civic Understanding joined with the other opposition parties in discussion of the upcoming election campaign and a possible coalition after the election.

Two polls in June and July 1998 showed the Party of Civic Understanding in third place with either 14.2% or 18.4% of the vote, with the party leader Rudolph Schuster being the most popular figure in the country. However at the September 1998 parliamentary election the Party of Civic Understanding won only 8% of the vote and gained 13 seats in parliament, the fewest any of the parties which won seats at the election. The under performance by the party was put down to attacks by Slovenská televízia, the state television station, and possibly voter dislike of the negative campaign by the party.

== Government ==
Following the 1998 election, the Party of Civic Understanding joined a coalition government with the Slovak Democratic Coalition (SDK), Party of the Democratic Left (SDL) and the Party of the Hungarian Coalition (SMK), after refusing an approach from the HZDS. The party got 2 ministerial posts in the new government, European Integration and Privatisation and a deputy prime minister. In return for not taking a third ministry, they got agreement that all the government parties would support Rudolf Schuster to become the next president.

The new government had a three-fifths majority in parliament and so was able to amend the constitution to provide for the direct election of the president, instead of the previous election by parliament. As part of the coalition agreement, the leader of the Party of Civic Understanding, Rudolf Schuster, was the candidate of the coalition government for president at the 1999 election. Schuster led the first round with 47.4% of the vote and was elected president at the run-off, defeating the former Prime Minister Vladimír Mečiar by 57.2% to 42.8%.

Following the presidential election, Pavol Hamžík was elected the new leader of the party in June 1999. However the party lost support in government and after the formation of Direction – Social Democracy in November 1999, the Party of Civic Understanding was at less than 5% in the polls. By 2002 the founder of Markíza, Pavol Rusko, no longer supported the Party of Civic Understanding and instead created his own party, Alliance of the New Citizen.

== 2002 election and merger ==
At the September 2002 election the Party of Civic Understanding competed on a joint list with the Party of the Democratic Left, but with only 19 places on the candidate list, compared to 108 for the Party of the Democratic Left. Before signing the agreement the Party of Civic Understanding was only getting 1% in an April 2002 opinion poll. However even combined they only won 1.36% at the election and thus got no seats in parliament.

On the 1 March 2003 delegates at an extraordinary congress of the Party of Civic Understanding voted for the party to dissolve. They called on all 5,000 members to join Direction – Social Democracy, while the leader of the Party of Civic Understanding, Pavol Hamžík, signed an agreement on cooperation with the leader of Direction – Social Democracy Robert Fico.

== Leaders ==
Leader	Period
Rudolf Schuster	1998–1999
Pavol Hamžík	1999–2003

== Election results ==
=== National Council ===
Election	Leader	Votes	%	Rank	Seats	+/–	Government
1998	Rudolf Schuster	269,343	8.02	#6	13 / 150	New	SDK–SDĽ–SMK–SOP
2002	Pavol Hamžík	39,163	1.36	#12	0 / 150	▼13	Extra-parliamentary
2002	Pavol Hamžík	Joint list with the Party of the Democratic Left			0 / 150	▼13	Extra-parliamentary

=== Presidential ===
Election	Candidate	First round		Second round		Result
Election	Candidate	Votes	%	Votes	%	Result
1999	Rudolf Schuster	1,396,950	47.37	1,727,481	57.18	Won
