= Ladislav Polka =

Slovak politician (1952–2025)

Member of the National Council
- In office 15 October 2002 – 7 February 2006
- In office 25 June 1992 – 29 October 1998

Personal details
- Born: 12 January 1952 Turzovka, Czechoslovakia
- Died: 24 April 2025 (aged 73)
- Party: Movement for a Democratic Slovakia (1992–2003); Liberal Party (2003)
- Education: Comenius University

Ladislav Polka (12 January 1952 – 24 April 2025) was a Slovak politician and police unionist. From 1992 to 1998 and again from 2002 to 2006, he served as a Member of the National Council of Slovakia.

== Background ==
Ladislav Polka was born on 12 January 1952 in the town of Turzovka in the Čadca District in northern Slovakia. In 1975 he graduated in law from the Comenius University. After graduation, he worked as a teacher at police academy. In 1989, he was one of the founders of the police trade union in Slovakia.

Polka died on 24 April 2025, at the age of 73. He is buried at the Slávičie údolie cemetery.

=== Political career ===
Polka was a member of the Movement for a Democratic Slovakia (HZDS). He was elected a Member of the National Council of Slovakia from 1992 to 1998 and again from 2002 to 2006. In 2003 he was among the group of 11 HZDS MPs who splintered from the party to start a new party called People's Union. Nonetheless, he soon after left also People's Union and served for the rest of his term as an independent MP.

After leaving People's Union, Polka voted with the government on several occasions, prompting corruption accusations from his former HZDS and People's Union comrades as well as uneasiness from some government MPs due to role Polka played in the authoritarian government led by HZDS in 1990s.

After leaving politics, Polka was active as a security analyst.
