= 2004 Slovak presidential election =

- 3 April 2004 (first round); 17 April 2004 (second round)
- Turnout: 47.94% (first round) ▼25.95pp 43.50% (second round) ▼31.95pp
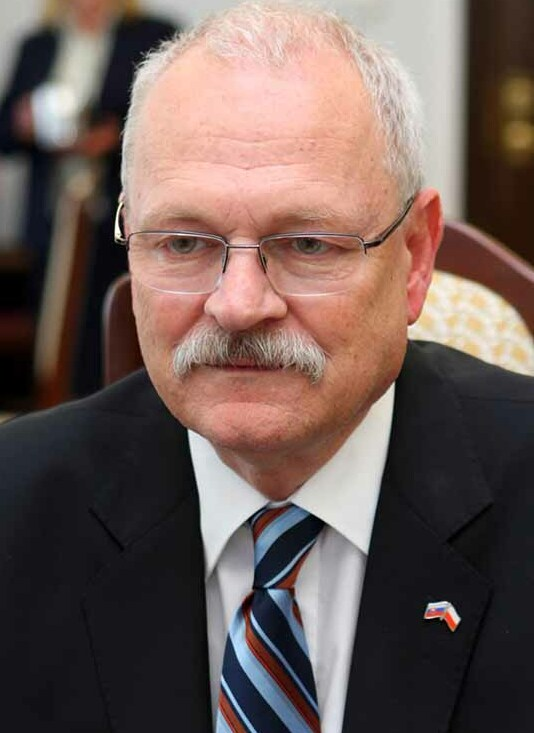

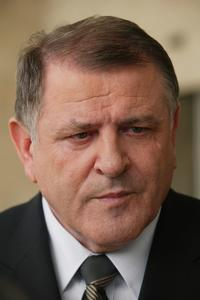
Nominee	Ivan Gašparovič	Vladimír Mečiar
Party	HZD	ĽS–HZDS
Popular vote	1,079,592	722,368
Percentage	59.91%	40.09%
President before election
Rudolf Schuster
Independent
Elected President
Ivan Gašparovič
HZD

Presidential elections were held in Slovakia on 3 April 2004, with a second round on 17 April. Although former Prime Minister Vladimír Mečiar received the most votes in the first round, he was defeated by Ivan Gašparovič in the run-off.

Eduard Kukan, who had led the opinion polling prior to the elections, was surprisingly eliminated in the first round, narrowly beaten into third place by Gašparovič. Gašparovič later admitted that he had not expect to qualify for the second round, and on first round election night he had gone home to sleep and only found out about his success when he was woken up by phone calls from friends.

Incumbent president Rudolf Schuster finished fourth with just 7% of the vote. He subsequently retired from politics.

== Opinion polls ==
Date	Agency	Schuster	Kukan	Mečiar	Gašparovič	Bútora	Mikloško	Roman	Králik	Kalman	Šesták	Bernát	Kubík
11–17 February 2004	Focus	17.5	27.5	23.1	13.7	6.1	4.7	5.4	0.5	0.5	0.5	0.4	0.1
9 March 2004	OMV	15.5	27.9	22.4	15.8	6.3	6.7	3.4	0.6	0.4	0.2	0.6	0.2
16–22 March 2004	Markant	9.7	30.3	23.3	19.7	5.5	4.4	—N/a	—N/a	—N/a	—N/a	—N/a	—N/a
27 March 2004	OMV	13.0	27.0	24.2	17.1	6.5	8.7	1.1	0.8	0.8	0.2	0.4	0.2

== Results ==
Candidate	Party	First round		Second round	
Candidate	Party	Votes	%	Votes	%
Vladimír Mečiar	People's Party – Movement for a Democratic Slovakia	650,242	32.74	722,368	40.09
Ivan Gašparovič	Movement for Democracy	442,564	22.28	1,079,592	59.91
Eduard Kukan	Slovak Democratic and Christian Union	438,920	22.10		
Rudolf Schuster	Independent	147,549	7.43		
František Mikloško	Christian Democratic Movement	129,414	6.52		
Martin Bútora	Independent	129,387	6.51		
Ján Králik	Party of the Democratic Left	15,873	0.80		
Jozef Kalman	Left Bloc	10,221	0.51		
Július Kubík	Independent	7,734	0.39		
Jozef Šesták	Independent	6,785	0.34		
Stanislav Bernát	Independent	5,719	0.29		
Ľubomír Roman	Alliance of the New Citizen	1,806	0.09		
Total		1,986,214	100.00	1,801,960	100.00
Valid votes		1,986,214	98.53	1,801,960	98.56
Invalid/blank votes		29,675	1.47	26,347	1.44
Total votes		2,015,889	100.00	1,828,307	100.00
Registered voters/turnout		4,204,899	47.94	4,202,597	43.50
Source: Nohlen & Stöver, European Election Database, Our Campaigns
