= President of Slovakia =

Head of state

President of the Slovak Republic
- Prezident Slovenskej republiky
- Presidential standard

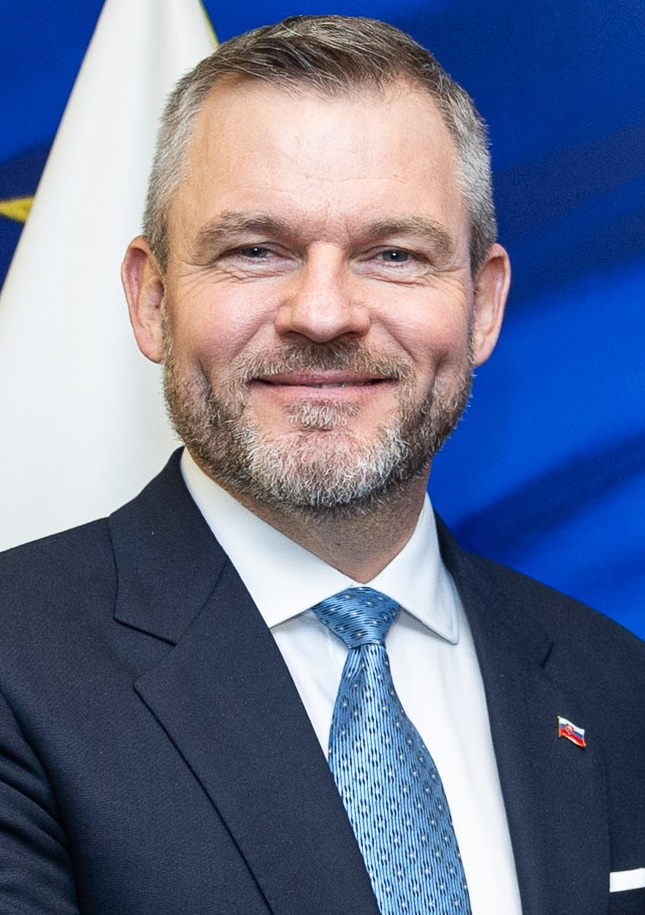
- Incumbent; Peter Pellegrini since 15 June 2024
- Style: Mr. President (informal); His Excellency (diplomatic)
- Type: Head of state
- Residence: Grassalkovich Palace, Old Town, Bratislava
- Appointer: Popular vote
- Term length: Five years, renewable once consecutively
- Constituting instrument: Constitution of Slovakia (1992)
- Formation: 2 March 1993; 33 years ago
- First holder: Michal Kováč
- Succession: Line of succession
- Salary: c. 204,000 € per annum (2024); Pension for former presidents: c. 48,000 € per annum
- Website: www.prezident.sk

The president of the Slovak Republic (Slovak: Prezident Slovenskej republiky) serves as the head of state of Slovakia and commander-in-chief of the Armed Forces. The people directly elect the president for five years, for a maximum of two consecutive terms. The presidency is essentially a ceremonial office, but the president exercises certain limited powers with absolute discretion. Their official residence is the Grassalkovich Palace in Bratislava.

== History ==
The office was established by the constitution of Slovakia on 1 January 1993, when Slovakia permanently split from Czechoslovakia and became independent. The office was vacant until 2 March, when the first president, Michal Kováč, was elected by the National Council of Slovak Republic. However, in 1998, the National Council could not elect a successor to Kováč. As a result, the position was vacant for half a year after Kováč's term ended in March 1998. The duties and powers of the office devolved upon the then-prime minister and speaker of the National Council. To resolve the issue, the constitution was changed to provide for the popular election of the president. Presidential elections have been held in 1999, 2004, 2009, 2014, 2019, and 2024.

Peter Pellegrini is the current president, taking office on 15 June 2024.

== Role and powers ==
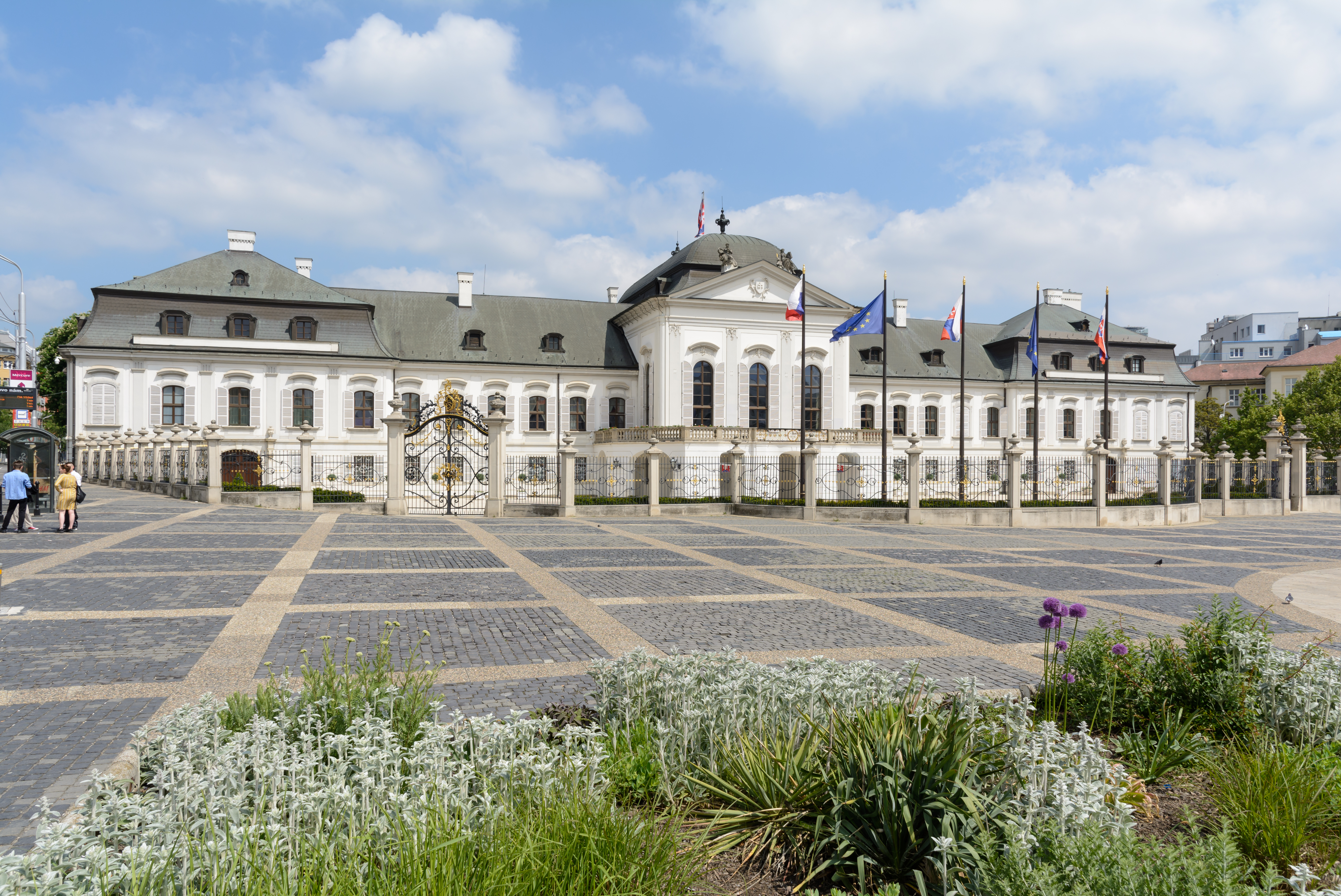
Grassalkovich Palace, official residence of the presidents of Slovakia

The president of Slovakia has a limited role in policy-making, as the office is largely ceremonial within the framework of a parliamentary republic. According to the constitution, the president is the supreme representative of the state both in Slovakia and abroad.

The president represents the Slovak Republic externally and concludes and ratifies international treaties. The president may delegate to the government or, with the government's consent, to individual members of the Slovak Republic, the conclusion of international treaties. Historically, all Slovak presidents delegated this power to the government which has been done by Decision of President No. 250/2001 Coll. (which superseded Decision of President No. 205/1993 Coll.).

Among the president's constitutional powers are nominating and appointing the prime minister. The constitution does not limit the president's choice; through their decisions, the president ensures the due performance of constitutional bodies. Because the government of whoever is appointed prime minister must receive a vote of confidence in parliament, the president usually appoints the winning party or coalition leader in parliamentary elections.

The president has sole discretion to appoint three members of the judicial council, one member of the Budget Council, and two members of the council of the Nation's Memory Institute; to award distinctions, to appoint the president and vice-president of the Constitutional Court of the Slovak Republic (from among the Constitutional Court judges), and to grant pardon or parole. They can veto any bill or proposal by the National Council, except for constitutional amendments. This veto can be overridden if the National Council passes the same bill again with a majority of all council members, so this power is considered relatively weak.

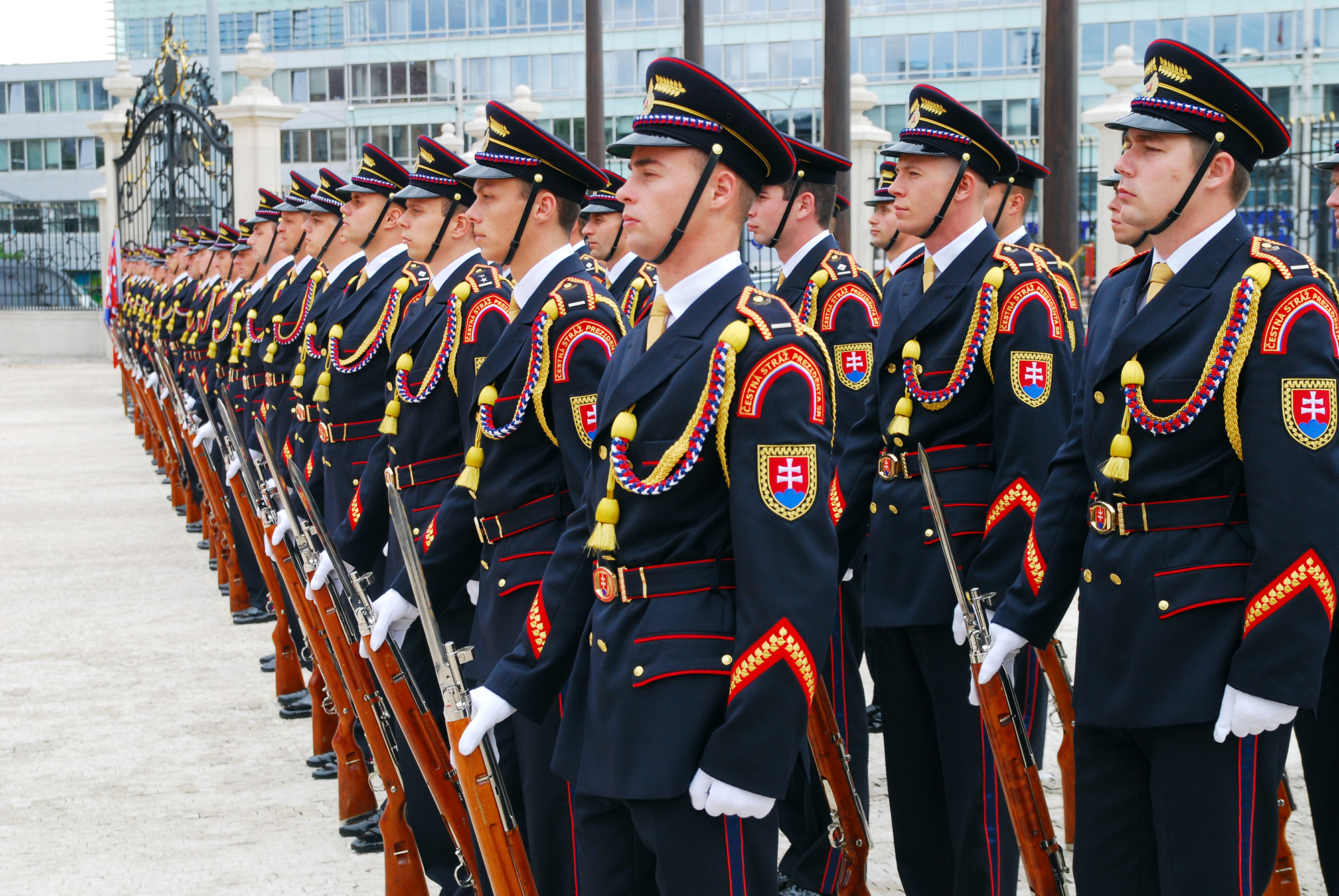
Honour Guard of the President

The president is formally the commander-in-chief of the Slovak armed forces, but this role is ceremonial because by the constitution when the president acts as the commander-in-chief, their decision is valid only after it is signed by the prime minister or a minister authorized by the prime minister.

Among their other constitutional duties are signing bills into law, appointing ministers on the prime minister's recommendation, and appointing various other state officials, such as generals, professors, judges, rectors, and prosecutors.

The president has discretionary power over the appointments of some officials. For example, there have been cases when the president has refused to appoint vice-governors of the National Bank of Slovakia recommended by the government. These actions of the president were confirmed by the Constitutional Court.

Presidential powers are substantially increased in special circumstances when the National Council passes a vote of no confidence in the government. In such a case, many executive powers of government (e.g., appointment of officials, foreign trips, signing treaties) are subject to the president's approval, and the president can appoint the government without being subject to the parliament's approval.

== List of presidents of Slovakia ==
=== Slovak Republic (1939–1945) ===
No.	Portrait	Name (Birth–Death)	Took office	Left office	Duration	Party
1		Jozef Tiso (1887–1947)	26 October 1939	4 April 1945	5 years, 160 days	HSĽS–SSNJ

=== Slovak Republic (since 1993) ===
No.	Portrait	Name (Birth–Death)	Took office	Left office	Duration	Party	Election
1		Michal Kováč (1930–2016)	2 March 1993	2 March 1998	5 years	ĽS–HZDS	1993
Vladimír Mečiar, Ivan Gašparovič (acting, 1998); Mikuláš Dzurinda, Jozef Migaš (acting, 1998–1999)
2		Rudolf Schuster (born 1934)	15 June 1999	15 June 2004	5 years	SOP	1999
3		Ivan Gašparovič (born 1941)	15 June 2004	15 June 2009	10 years	HZD	2004
3		Ivan Gašparovič (born 1941)	15 June 2009	15 June 2014	10 years	HZD	2009
4		Andrej Kiska (born 1963)	15 June 2014	15 June 2019	5 years	Independent	2014
5		Zuzana Čaputová (born 1973)	15 June 2019	15 June 2024	5 years	PS	2019
6		Peter Pellegrini (born 1975)	15 June 2024	Incumbent	2 years, 113 days	Hlas	2024

== Latest election ==
Candidate	Party	First round		Second round	
Candidate	Party	Votes	%	Votes	%
Ivan Korčok	Independent	958,393	42.52	1,243,709	46.88
Peter Pellegrini	Voice – Social Democracy	834,718	37.03	1,409,255	53.12
Štefan Harabin	Independent	264,579	11.74		
Krisztián Forró	Hungarian Alliance	65,588	2.91		
Igor Matovič	Slovakia	49,201	2.18		
Ján Kubiš	Independent	45,957	2.04		
Patrik Dubovský	For the People	16,107	0.71		
Marian Kotleba	Kotlebists – People's Party Our Slovakia	12,771	0.57		
Milan Náhlik	Independent	3,111	0.14		
Andrej Danko (Note: Candidate withdrew in favour of Harabin, but was still on the ballot.)	Slovak National Party	1,905	0.08		
Róbert Švec	Slovak Revival Movement	1,876	0.08		
Total		2,254,206	100.00	2,652,964	100.00
Valid votes		2,254,206	99.53	2,652,964	99.35
Invalid/blank votes		10,563	0.47	17,233	0.65
Total votes		2,264,769	100.00	2,670,197	100.00
Registered voters/turnout		4,364,071	51.90	4,368,697	61.12
Source: First Round, Second Round

== See also ==
- List of prime ministers of Slovakia
- List of speakers of Slovak parliaments
- List of presidents of Czechoslovakia
