= Rudolf Schuster =

President of Slovakia from 1999 to 2004

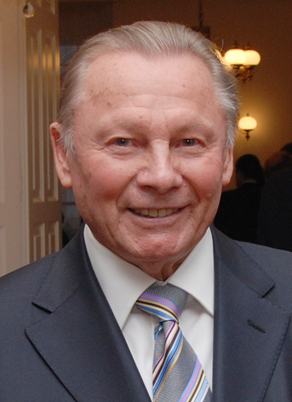
- Schuster in 2011

2nd President of Slovakia
- In office 15 June 1999 – 15 June 2004
- Prime Minister: Mikuláš Dzurinda
- Preceded by: Michal Kováč; Mikuláš Dzurinda (Acting); Jozef Migaš (Acting)
- Succeeded by: Ivan Gašparovič

Member of the National Council
- In office 30 October 1998 – 15 June 1999

Mayor of Košice
- In office 1994–1999
- In office 1983–1986

Czechoslovakia Ambassador to Canada
- In office 28 August 1990 – 3 May 1992
- Preceded by: Ján Janovic
- Succeeded by: Position abolished

Speaker of the National Council
- In office 30 November 1989 – 26 June 1990
- Preceded by: Viliam Šalgovič
- Succeeded by: František Mikloško

Personal details
- Born: 4 January 1934 (age 92) Košice, Czechoslovakia
- Party: Independent (1990–1998, 1999–present)
- Other political affiliations: Communist Party (1964–1990); Party of Civic Understanding (1998–1999)
- Spouse: Irena Schusterová-Trojáková (m. 1961; died 2008)
- Education: Slovak University of Technology in Bratislava
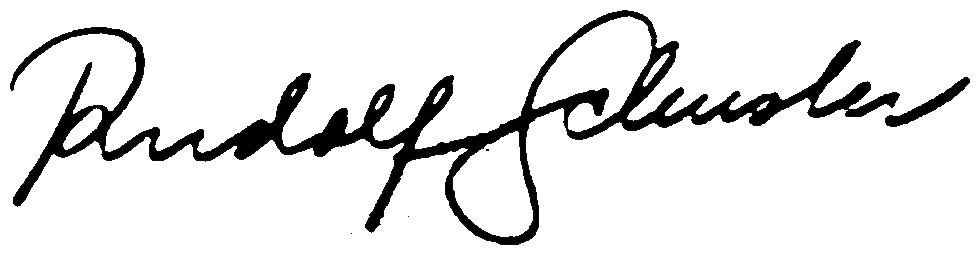
- Signature

Rudolf Schuster (born 4 January 1934) is a Slovak politician who served as the second president of Slovakia from 1999 to 2004. He was elected on 29 May 1999 and inaugurated on 15 June. In the presidential elections of April 2004, in which he sought re-election, Schuster was defeated. He received only 7.4% of the vote, with three other candidates (more specifically Ivan Gašparovič, Vladimír Mečiar, and Eduard Kukan) receiving more than that. He was succeeded by Ivan Gašparovič.

== Life and career ==
Schuster was born in Košice. From 1964 to 1990, he was a member of the Communist Party of Slovakia. Before becoming president, he was mayor of Košice in 1983–1986 and 1994–1999 respectively. He was also the last Communist president of the Slovak National Council (1989–1990), Ambassador of Czechoslovakia to Canada (1990–1992) and a leader of the Party of Civic Understanding (SOP – Strana občianskeho porozumenia, 1998–1999).

Schuster speaks German (including Mantak dialect), Slovak, Czech, Russian, English and Hungarian fluently.

Schuster's father's family is of Carpathian German origin, while his mother's family is of Hungarian origin. Rudolf Schuster was married in 1961 to Irena Trojáková (died 2008) and he has two children (son Peter and daughter Ingrid) and two granddaughters. In his private life, he is a sports fan, a traveller and a writer. He is also a camera fan.

In 1998, Schuster founded the centre-left Party of Civic Understanding. In 1999, he received honorary citizenship from Miskolc, as recognition of the good cooperation between the city and Košice during his mayorship.

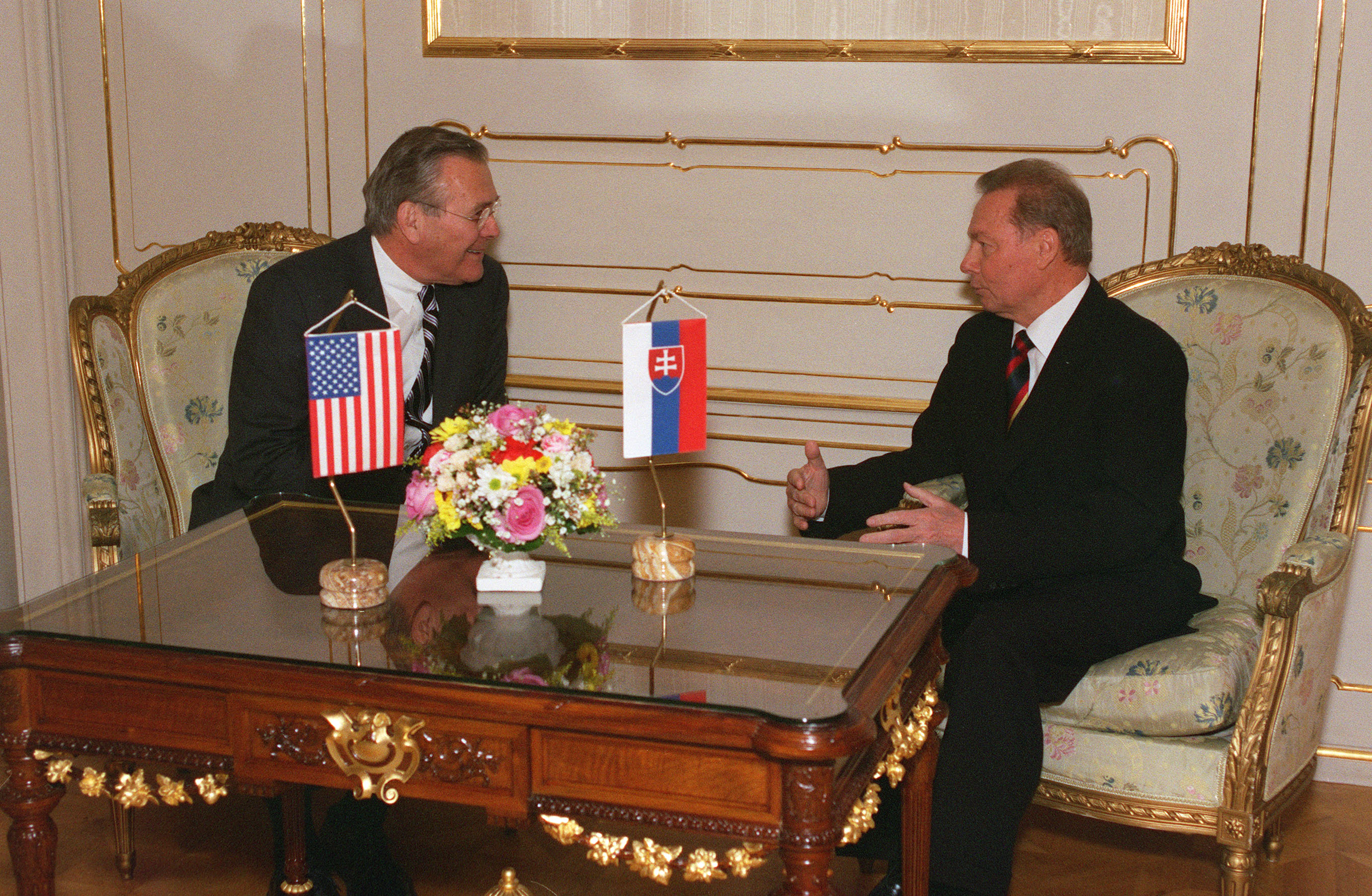
Secretary of Defense Donald Rumsfeld meets with President of Slovakia Rudolf Schuster at the Presidential Palace in Bratislava on 22 November 2002.

In 2004, Schuster sought re-election in the 2004 presidential election and received 7.4% of the votes.

== Writing ==
Rudolf Schuster is a member of the Association of Slovak Writers. He has been the author of film scripts for various television films. His most famous works are detective novels and travelogues mainly about Brazil and Canada.

=== Bibliography ===
- Necestami Brazílie (1987)
- Prípad „Puntičkár“ (1987)
- Nežiaduci dôkaz (1988)
- Čierny notes (1989) – ISBN 80-85110-09-1
- Bol som pri tom (1989)
- Rodné putá: J. Fabini (1994) – ISBN 8085727129
- So skalpelom a bez neho (1994) – ISBN 80-85727-13-7
- Stopy viedli k Indiánom (1995) – ISBN 80-967412-1-7
- Strieborný mercedes (1995) – ISBN 80-85727-14-5
- Ultimátum (1996) – ISBN 80-967412-2-5
- Hlavná (1997) – ISBN 80-967412-4-1
- Návrat do veľkej politiky (1998) – ISBN 80-968272-0-0
- Explózia (1999) – ISBN 80-967412-7-6
- Ako to bolo (2000)
- Rozhovory s Milanom Čičom (2001) – ISBN 80-968272-7-8
- Muž s dvoma srdcami (2001) – ISBN 80-968272-5-1
- V tieni brazilských pralesov (2002) – ISBN 80-890840-5-2
- Farby Islandu (2009) – ISBN 978-80-89084-23-4
- V krajine ľadových medveďov (2010) – ISBN 978-80-89084-29-6
- Deň na južnom póle (2011) – ISBN 978-80-89084-35-7
- Kanada, od mora k moru / Canada, From Sea to Sea (2014) – ISBN 978-80-89084-38-8

== Honours and awards ==
=== National honours ===
Ribbon bar	Country	Honours	Date
	Czechoslovakia	Honour for Services to the Building	1983
	Czechoslovakia	Czechoslovak Order of Labour	1989
	Slovakia	First Class of the Pribina Cross	1998
	Slovakia	First Class of the Order of Andrej Hlinka	2019
	Slovakia	First Class of the Order of Ľudovít Štúr	2019
	Slovakia	First Class of the Milan Rastislav Štefánik Cross	2019
	Slovakia	Medal for Services to Slovak Diplomacy	2023
	Slovakia	Gratitude Medal	2024

=== Foreign honours ===
Ribbon bar	Country	Honours	Date
	Algeria	Collar of the National Order of Merit	2003
	Argentina	Collar of the Order of the Liberator General San Martín	2001
	Austria	Grand Star of the Decoration of Honour for Services to the Republic of Austria	2004
	Brazil	Grand Collar of the Order of the Southern Cross	2001
	Brazil	Grand Cross of the Order of Rio Branco	2024
	Chile	Collar of the Order of Merit	2001
	Croatia	Grand Order of King Tomislav with Sash and Great Morning Star	2001
	Czech Republic	Grand Cross of the Order of the White Lion	2019
	Germany	Grand Cross Special Class of the Order of Merit of the Federal Republic of Germany	2001
	Greece	Grand Cross of the Order of the Redeemer	2000
	Holy See	Knight Grand Cross with Collar of the Order of Pope Pius IX	2002
	Hungary	Grand Cross with Chain of the Order of Merit of the Republic of Hungary	2003
	Italy	Knight Grand Cross with Collar of the Order of Merit of the Italian Republic	2002
	Lebanon	Extraordinary Class of the Order of Merit	2001
	Luxembourg	Knight Grand Cross of the Order of the Gold Lion of the House of Nassau	2002
	Poland	Knight of the Order of the White Eagle	2002
	Portugal	Grand Collar of the Order of Prince Henry	2003
	Romania	Grand Collar of the Order of the Star of Romania	2000
	Sweden	Knight of the Royal Order of the Seraphim	2002
	Slovenia	Gold Order of Freedom of the Republic of Slovenia	2003
	SMOM	Collar of the Order pro Merito Melitensi	1999
	Spain	Collar of the Royal Order of Isabella the Catholic	2002
	Ukraine	First Class of the Order of Prince Yaroslav the Wise	2004
