= Miroslav Abelovský =

Slovak politician

Miroslav Abelovský (born June 6, 1948) is a Slovak politician.

Born in Zvolen, Miroslav Abelovský was elected to the National Council of the Slovak Republic in the parliamentary elections in 2002 for the People's Party – Movement for a Democratic Slovakia. He was re-elected in the 2006 Slovak parliamentary election.
