= Ľubiša =

- Municipality
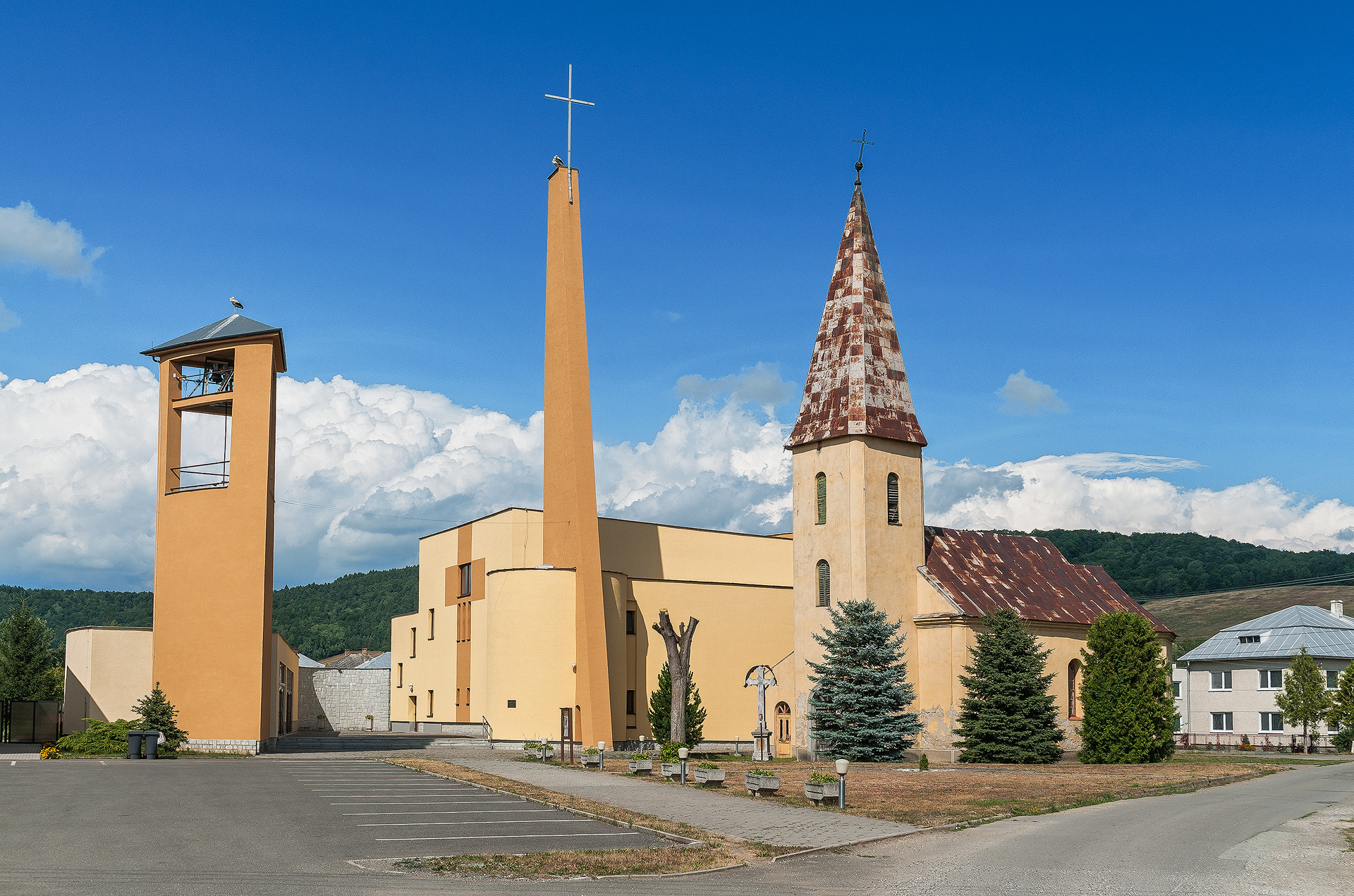
- Skyline of Ľubiša in Slovakia

- Flag

- Location of Ľubiša in the Prešov Region Location of Ľubiša in Slovakia
- Coordinates: 49.00°N 21.95°E
- Country: Slovakia
- Region: Prešov Region
- District: Humenné District
- First mentioned: 1410

Government
  - Mayor: Jozef Sklenčár

Area
  - Total: 10.02 km^{2} (3.87 sq mi)
- Elevation: 164 m (538 ft)

Population (2025)
  - Total: 812
- Time zone: UTC+1 (CET)
  - Summer (DST): UTC+2 (CEST)
- Postal code: 671 1
- Area code: +421 57
- Vehicle registration plate (until 2022): HE
- Website: www.obeclubisa.sk

Ľubiša (Rusyn: Любіша, Hungarian: Szerelmes) is a village and municipality in Humenné District in the Prešov Region of north-east Slovakia.

== History ==
In historical records the village was first mentioned in 1410.

== Geography ==
The municipality lies at an altitude of 164 metres (538 ft) and covers an area of 10.02 km^{2} (3.87 sq mi) (2025).

== Population ==
Population statistic (10 years)
Year	1995	2005	2015	2025
Count	800	857	814	812
Difference		+7.12%	−5.01%	−0.24%

Population statistic
Year	2024	2025
Count	819	812
Difference		−0.85%

It has a population of 812 people (31 December 2025).

=== Ethnicity ===
Census 2021 (1+ %)
Ethnicity	Number	Fraction
Slovak	801	97.92%
Romani	18	2.2%
Rusyn	18	2.2%
Not found out	18	2.2%
Total	818	

In year 2021 was 818 people by ethnicity 801 as Slovak, 18 as Romani, 18 as Rusyn, 18 as Not found out, 3 as Other, 1 as Czech and 1 as Ukrainian.

Note on population: The difference values of population numbers in the table "Population statistic" and in the sections "Ethnicity" & "Religion" is caused by the use of various statistical methods.

=== Religion ===
Census 2021 (1+ %)
Religion	Number	Fraction
Roman Catholic Church	715	87.41%
Greek Catholic Church	36	4.4%
None	33	4.03%
Total	818	

In year 2021 was 818 people by religion 715 from Roman Catholic Church, 36 from Greek Catholic Church, 33 from None, 7 from Not found out, 7 from Christian Congregations in Slovakia, 7 from Evangelical Church, 5 from Eastern Orthodox Church, 2 from Calvinist Church, 2 from Church of Jesus Christ of Latter-day Saints, 1 from Jehovah's Witnesses, 1 from Other, 1 from Buddhism and 1 from Ad hoc movements.

== Municipality ==
In 2021, 42.7% of municipal waste produced in Ľubiša was separated for recycling, which was an annual rise by 8%.
