= Bystričany =

- Municipality
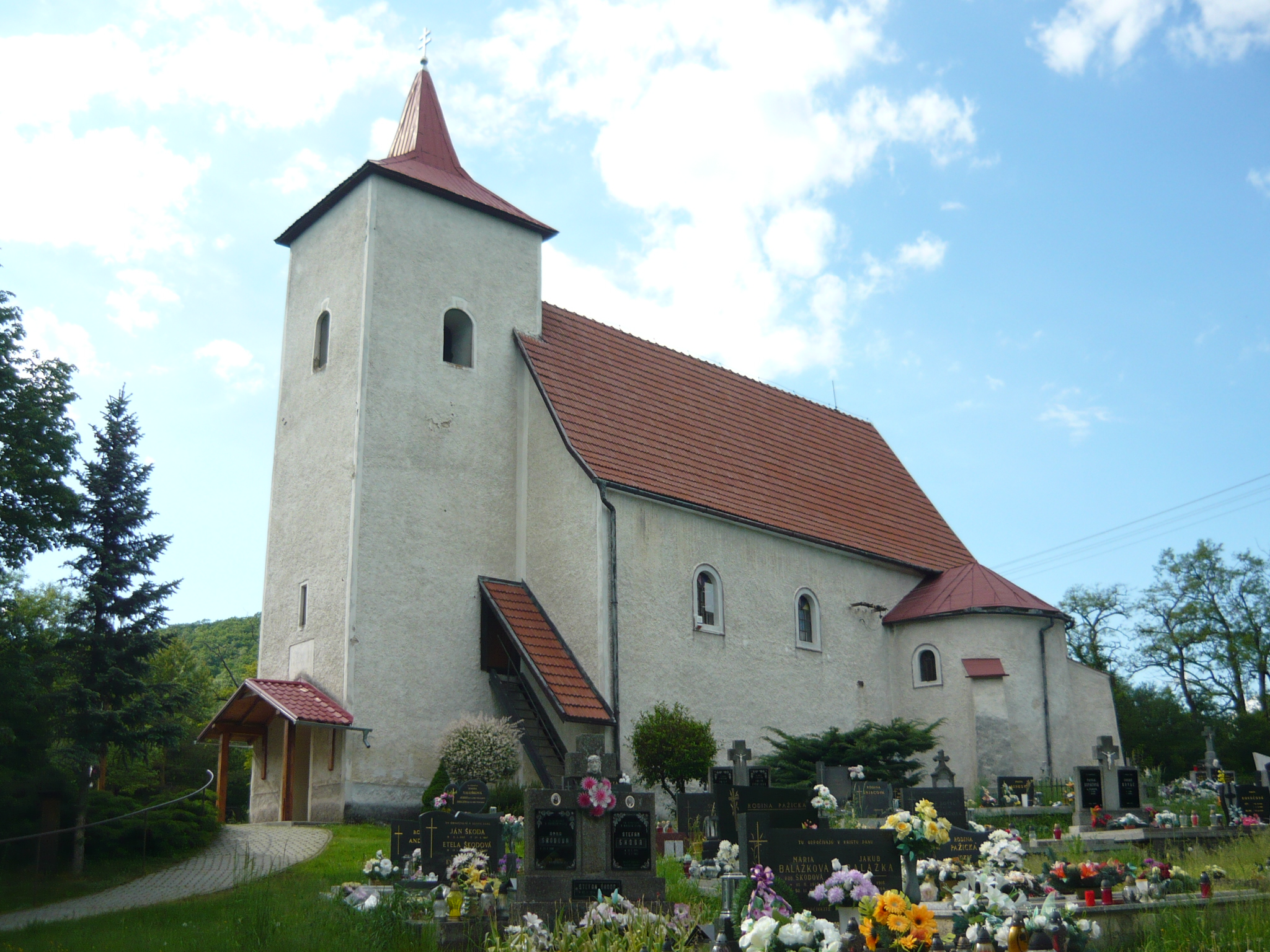
- Church of Saint Anne

- Flag

- Location of Bystričany in the Trenčín Region Location of Bystričany in Slovakia
- Coordinates: 48.67°N 18.52°E
- Country: Slovakia
- Region: Trenčín Region
- District: Prievidza District
- First mentioned: 1388

Area
  - Total: 37.63 km^{2} (14.53 sq mi)
- Elevation: 239 m (784 ft)

Population (2025)
  - Total: 1,724
- Time zone: UTC+1 (CET)
  - Summer (DST): UTC+2 (CEST)
- Postal code: 972 45
- Area code: +421 46
- Vehicle registration plate (until 2022): PD
- Website: www.bystricany.sk

Bystričany (Hungarian: Besztercsény) is a village and municipality in Prievidza District in the Trenčín Region of western Slovakia.

== History ==
In historical records the village was first mentioned in 1388.

== Geography ==
The municipality lies at an altitude of 239 metres (784 ft) and covers an area of 37.63 km^{2} (14.53 sq mi) (2025).

== Population ==
Population statistic (10 years)
Year	1995	2005	2015	2025
Count	1798	1823	1809	1724
Difference		+1.39%	−0.76%	−4.69%

Population statistic
Year	2024	2025
Count	1739	1724
Difference		−0.86%

It has a population of 1724 people (31 December 2025).

=== Ethnicity ===
Census 2021 (1+ %)
Ethnicity	Number	Fraction
Slovak	1770	99.15%
Not found out	18	1%
Total	1785	

In year 2021 was 1785 people by ethnicity 1770 as Slovak, 18 as Not found out, 9 as Czech, 4 as Other, 3 as Romani, 3 as Austrian, 3 as Hungarian, 2 as Rusyn, 2 as German, 1 as Jewish and 1 as Russian.

Note on population: The difference values of population numbers in the table "Population statistic" and in the sections "Ethnicity" & "Religion" is caused by the use of various statistical methods.

=== Religion ===
Census 2021 (1+ %)
Religion	Number	Fraction
Roman Catholic Church	1320	73.95%
None	364	20.39%
Evangelical Church	22	1.23%
Total	1785	

In year 2021 was 1785 people by religion 1320 from Roman Catholic Church, 364 from None, 22 from Evangelical Church, 17 from Not found out, 12 from Christian Congregations in Slovakia, 9 from Jehovah's Witnesses, 7 from Paganism and natural spirituality, 7 from Greek Catholic Church, 7 from Buddhism, 5 from Other and not ascertained christian church, 5 from Other, 5 from Ad hoc movements, 2 from Calvinist Church, 2 from Apostolic Church and 1 from Hinduism.

== Genealogical resources ==
The records for genealogical research are available at the state archive "Statny Archiv in Nitra, Slovakia"

- Roman Catholic church records (births/marriages/deaths): 1688-1939 (parish A)

== See also ==
- List of municipalities and towns in Slovakia
