= Ivan Gašparovič =

President of Slovakia from 2004 to 2014

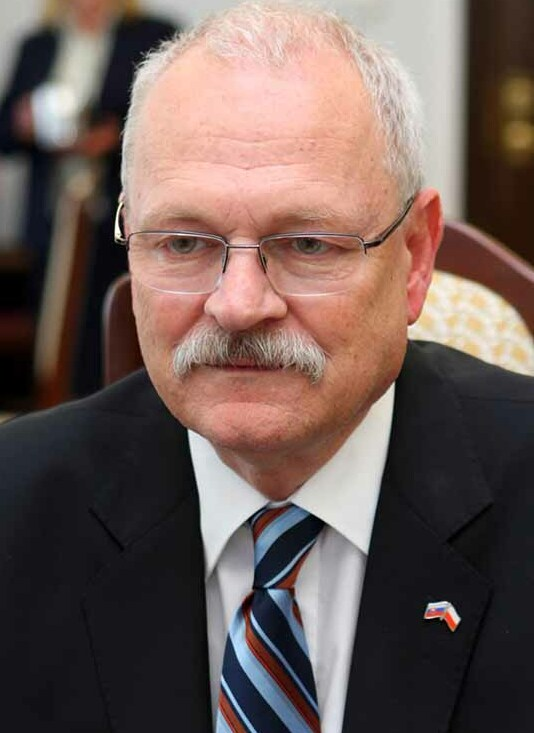
- Gašparovič in 2008

3rd President of Slovakia
- In office 15 June 2004 – 15 June 2014
- Prime Minister: Mikuláš Dzurinda; Robert Fico; Iveta Radičová
- Preceded by: Rudolf Schuster
- Succeeded by: Andrej Kiska
- Acting; 2 March 1998 – 30 October 1998 Serving with Vladimír Mečiar
- Prime Minister: Vladimír Mečiar
- Preceded by: Michal Kováč
- Succeeded by: Mikuláš Dzurinda (acting); Jozef Migaš (acting)

Speaker of the National Council
- In office 23 June 1992 – 30 October 1998
- Preceded by: František Mikloško
- Succeeded by: Jozef Migaš

Member of the National Council
- In office 23 June 1992 – 15 October 2002

Personal details
- Born: 27 March 1941 (age 85) Poltár, Slovak Republic
- Party: Communist Party (1968); People's Party – Movement for a Democratic Slovakia (1992–2002); Movement for Democracy (2002–2004)
- Spouse: Silvia Beníková (m. 1964)
- Children: 2
- Education: Comenius University
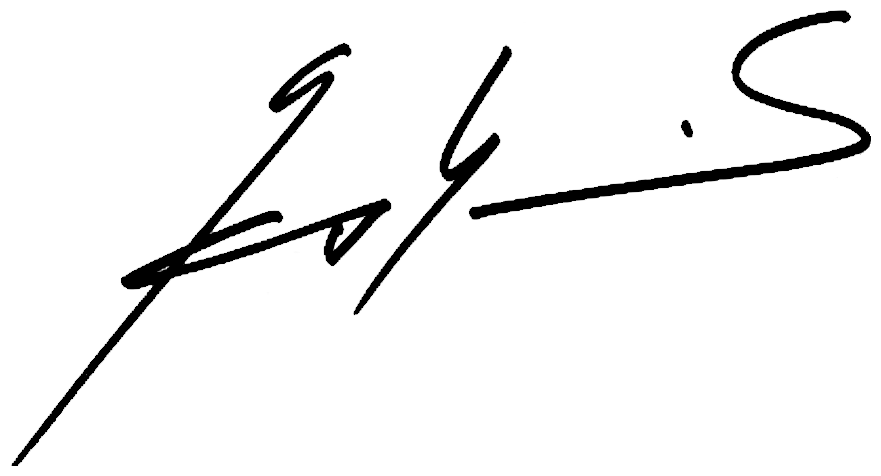
- Signature

Ivan Gašparovič (Note: Slovak pronunciation: [ˈiʋaŋ ˈɡaʂparɔʋitʂ]; Croatian: Ivan Gašparović) (born 27 March 1941) is a Slovak politician and lawyer who was the third president of Slovakia from 2004 to 2014. He was also the first and currently the only Slovak president to be re-elected.

== Biography ==
Ivan Gašparovič was born in Poltár, near Lučenec and Banská Bystrica in present-day south-central Slovakia, which was at that time the first Slovak Republic. His father, Vladimir Gašparović, emigrated to Czechoslovakia from Rijeka in modern-day Croatia at the end of World War I and was a teacher at a secondary school in Bratislava, and at one point its Headmaster. Gašparovič studied at the law faculty of the Comenius University in Bratislava, which is the main university in Slovakia, from 1959 to 1964. He worked in the District Prosecutor's Office of the district of Martin (1965–66), then became a Prosecutor at the Municipal Prosecutor's Office of Bratislava (1966–68). In 1968, he joined the Communist Party of Slovakia, supposedly to support Alexander Dubček's reforms, but he was expelled from the party after the Warsaw Pact invasion in Czechoslovakia in August 1968.

== Early career ==
However, in spite of his expulsion, Gašparovič was able to continue his legal career and from 1968 to July 1990, he was a teacher at the Department of Criminal Law, Criminology and Criminological Practice at the law faculty of the Comenius University in Bratislava. In February 1990, he became the prorector (deputy vice-chancellor) of Comenius University.

After the Velvet Revolution and the subsequent fall of the Communist regime, Gašparovič was chosen by the newly elected democratic president Václav Havel to become the country's federal Prosecutor-General. After March 1992, he was briefly the vice-president of the Legislative Council of Czechoslovakia, before the federal Czechoslovakia split into two independent states in January 1993. Gašparovič temporarily returned to the Comenius University law faculty. He was a member of the Scientific Council of the Comenius University and of the Scientific Council of the law faculty of the same university. In late 1992, he was one of the authors of the Constitution of Slovakia.

In 1992 Gašparovič joined the Movement for a Democratic Slovakia (HZDS, Hnutie za demokratické Slovensko), led by Vladimír Mečiar. Gašparovič was one of the central figures of Prime Minister Mečiar's administration. He became Speaker of the National Council of the Slovak Republic (NRSR) after the victory of the HZDS in the June 1992 elections. When a scandal erupted over the discovery of microphones in the U.S. Consulate in November 1992, Gašparovič was asked by Mečiar to head a commission to investigate the background of the affair, but the results were inconclusive. Later that year, when Mečiar's government attempted to close down the opposition-led Trnava University, Gašparovič sided with the Prime Minister, echoing his argument that its opening was "illegal." The West viewed Mečiar's government as untrustworthy, and the country was excluded from the EU and NATO expansion talks that went on at the time at the neighbouring central European countries.

The period of the HZDS rule was among other things marked by persistent animosity between the HZDS-led government and the country's President Michal Kováč, a vocal opponent of Mečiar. The conflict had gotten to the point where the Slovak Secret Service SIS was alleged to have kidnapped the president's son, Michal Jr., plying him with alcohol, and dropping him in front of a police station in Hainburg in Austria, a country where he was wanted on suspicion of financial fraud.

A part of this continuous feud was Gašparovič's widely publicized derogatory comment made in reference to President Kováč not being aware that the parliamentary microphone was on, calling Kováč "an old dick" {starý chuj}.

From October 1998 to 15 July 2002, when his HZDS was an opposition party, Gašparovič was a member of the parliamentary Committee for the Supervision of the SIS (the Slovak equivalent of CIA). He was also a member of the delegation of the Slovak parliament in the Interparliamentary Union.

In July 2002 after four years in opposition Gašparovič left the HZDS after Mečiar decided not to include him and some other HZDS members on the ballot for the upcoming elections. Gašparovič along with the other members immediately (on 12 July) founded a new party, the Hnutie za demokraciu (HZD) Movement for Democracy, a name bearing a close resemblance to his former HZDS. The cited reasons for the departure were internal disputes within the party, or as Gašparovič put it in an interview with The Slovak Spectator, "differences of opinion with HZDS leader [Vladimír] Mečiar, mostly about the leadership of the party." In the September 2002 elections his party polled 3.3 percent, not enough to win seats in the parliament. After the elections, Gašparovič returned to the law faculty of the Comenius University, and wrote several university textbooks as well as working papers and studies on criminal law.

In April 2004 Gašparovič decided to run for the presidency against Vladimír Mečiar and the then governing coalition's candidate Eduard Kukan. In an unexpected turn of events, the perceived underdog Gašparovič received the second highest number of votes and moved on to the second round, once again facing Mečiar. The main factor for Gašparovič's first round success was the low turnout of the front-runner Kukan's electorate, as Kukan was generally considered to be a sure bet for the second round. In other words, the majority of the population viewed the first round as a formality, and was saving their effort for the second round to keep Mečiar at bay. Hence in the second round the (potential) Eduard Kukan voters faced an uneasy choice between two representatives of the past regime. Ultimately, Gašparovič, regarded by Mečiar opponents as the "lesser evil", was elected as the president (see 2004 Slovakia presidential election).

== President of Slovakia ==
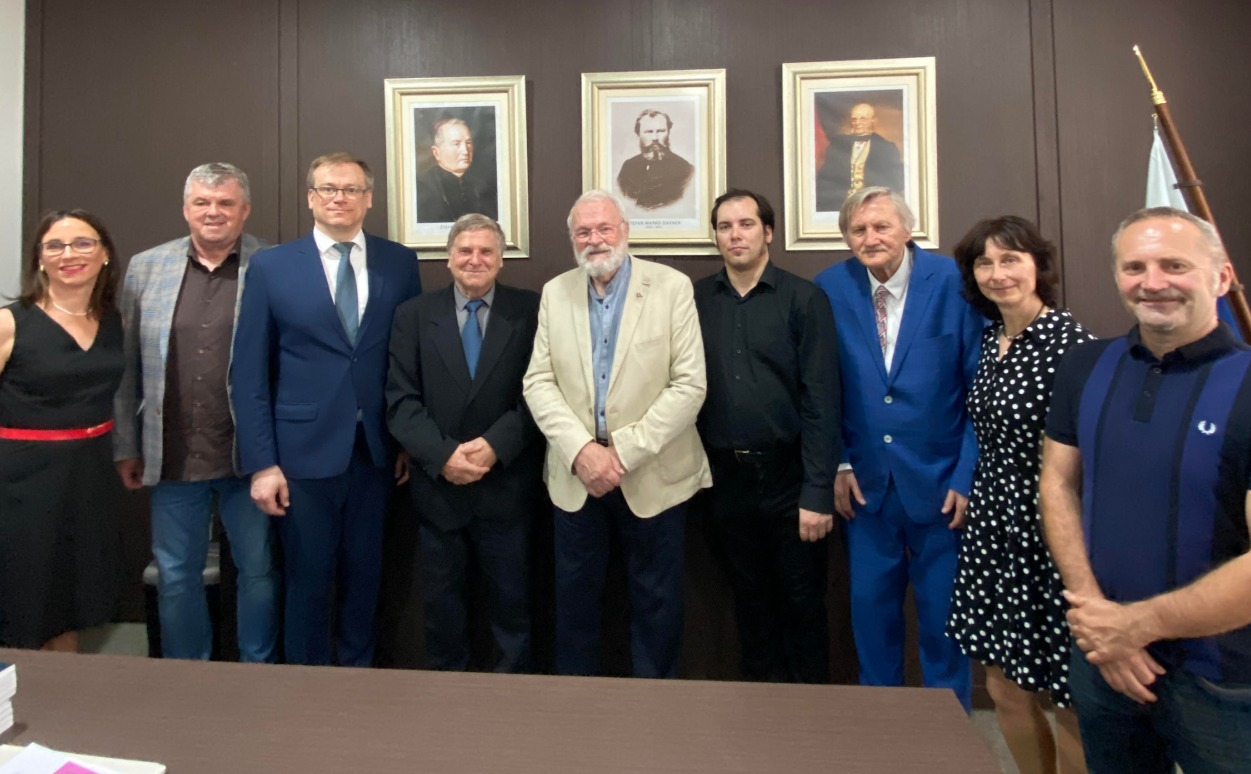
President Ivan Gašparovič in Matica Slovenská on the occasion of the awarding of Stanislav Harangozo

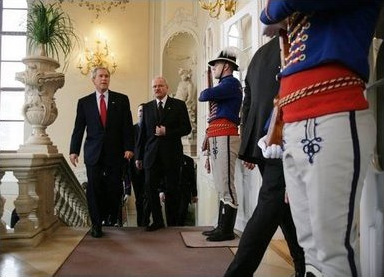
President George W. Bush and Slovak President Ivan Gašparovič in Grassalkovich Palace in Bratislava

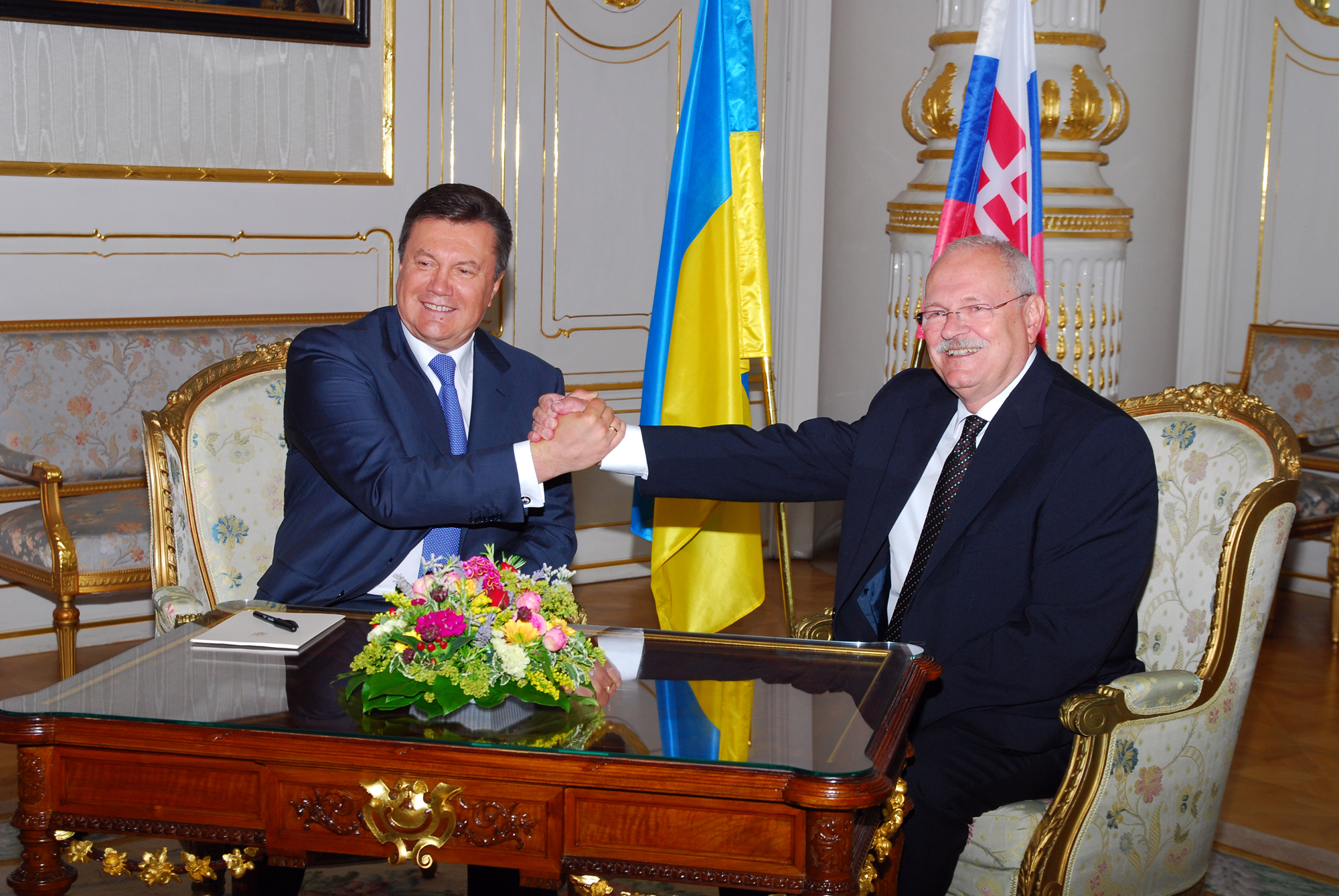
Gašparovič meets with President of Ukraine Viktor Yanukovych on 17 June 2011

Gašparovič's toned down and non-confrontational approach to presidency has increased his popularity with many voters, and he is a generally popular president now. However, to date he has remained unapologetic about his role in the Mečiar's regime, which is generally perceived to have set back Slovakia's post-communist political and economic progress and development. Gašparovič was supported by the Direction – Social Democracy of Prime Minister Robert Fico and the Slovak National Party a nationalist and populist party led by Jan Slota.

=== Controversies ===
In a 23 August 2011 statement, Gašparovič opposed erecting a sculpture in memory of controversial Hungarian minority politician János Esterházy in Kosice, saying that the one-time deputy had been a follower of Hitler and fascism. He also opposed Ferdinand Ďurčanský's sculpture for similar reasons. According to Hungarian President Pál Schmitt, Esterházy rejected both fascism and communism, suffered in the Gulag and died in a Moravian prison in 1957.

Marek Trubac, the Slovak president's spokesman, told MTI that Esterházy is considered a war criminal in Slovakia, "for supporting fascist ideology". Though Esterházy did vote against the law about deportations of Jews, he also welcomed (former Hungarian regent) Horthy's "fascist troops" that occupied Kosice, the spokesman added.

He has also become well known for his misspeaks that are often topics of conversations and jokes among Slovak public (e.g. referring to a letter by "white on black" instead of "black on white" or referring to United Nations (Slovak translation is "Organization of connected nations" Slovak: Organizácia spojených národov) as "Organization of connected tumors" Slovak: Organizácia spojených nádorov).

Political controversy followed him by his non-decision on naming new attorney general that had been elected by Slovak parliament as the president did not respect the vote and declined to name the attorney general into the function and caused on-going (July 2013) political crisis in Slovakia.

== Private life ==
In 1964, Gašparovič married Silvia Beníková, with whom he has two children. His favorite sport is ice hockey.

== Honours and awards ==
- Slovakia: Order of Andrej Hlinka (2004)
- Slovakia: Order of Ľudovít Štúr (2004)
- Slovakia: Milan Rastislav Štefánik Cross (2004)
- Slovakia: Pribina Cross (2004)

=== Foreign honours ===
- Austria: Grand Star of the Decoration of Honour for Services to the Republic of Austria (2014)
- Lithuania: Knight Grand Cross of the Order of Vytautas the Great (24 February 2005)
- Luxembourg: Knight Grand Cross of the Order of the Gold Lion of the House of Nassau (2005)
- Cyprus: Grand Collar of the Order of Makarios III (2007)
- Italy: Knight Grand Cross with Collar of the Order of Merit of the Italian Republic (20 February 2007)
- Netherlands: Knight Grand Cross of the Order of the Netherlands Lion (21 May 2007)
- Spain: Collar of Order of Isabella the Catholic (22 October 2007)
- Croatia: Grand Order of King Tomislav (27 October 2008)
- Greece: Grand Cross of the Order of the Redeemer (2007)
- Poland: Knight of the Order of the White Eagle (21 February 2009)
- Poland: Order of Polonia Restituta (2014)
- Norway: Grand Cross of the Order of St. Olav (26 October 2010)
- Latvia: Order of the Three Stars (28 February 2005)
- Estonia: Collar of the Order of the Cross of Terra Mariana (2005)
- Portugal: Grand Collar of the Military Order of Saint James of the Sword (4 September 2008)
- United Kingdom: Knight Grand Cross of the Order of the British Empire (24 October 2008)
- Kazakhstan: Member of the Order of Friendship (21 November 2007)
- Malta: Honorary Companion of Honour with Collar of the National Order of Malta (6 September 2011)
- Denmark: Knight of the Order of the Elephant (23 October 2012)
- Serbia: Grand Cross of the Order of the Republic of Serbia (21 January 2013)
- Czech Republic: Grand Cross with Collar of the Order of the White Lion (6 March 2013)
- France: Grand Cross of the Legion of Honour (29 October 2013)

== See also ==
- List of political parties in Slovakia
- List of presidents of Slovakia
- List of leaders of Slovak parliaments
- 2004 Slovakia presidential election
- Silvia Gašparovičová

== Notes ==
Political offices
Preceded by Michal Kováč	President of Slovakia; Acting; 1998; Served alongside: Vladimír Mečiar	Succeeded by Mikuláš Dzurinda; Acting
Preceded by Michal Kováč	President of Slovakia; Acting; 1998; Served alongside: Vladimír Mečiar	Succeeded by Jozef Migaš; Acting
Preceded by Rudolf Schuster	President of Slovakia; 2004–2014	Succeeded by Andrej Kiska
