= Rudolf Bauer (politician) =

Slovak politician

RNDr. Rudolf Bauer (born on September 28, 1957, in Ostrava, Czechoslovakia) was the first President of the Košice Self-governing Region (since December 19, 2001, till January 8, 2006).

He is also a former mathematician, the Mayor of the town of Košice and a deputy of the National Council of the Slovak Republic. As a member of Christian Democratic Movement he is a deputy of the Council of the Košice Self-governing Region. He is married with three children.
