= Michal Kováč =

First president of Slovakia from 1993 to 1998

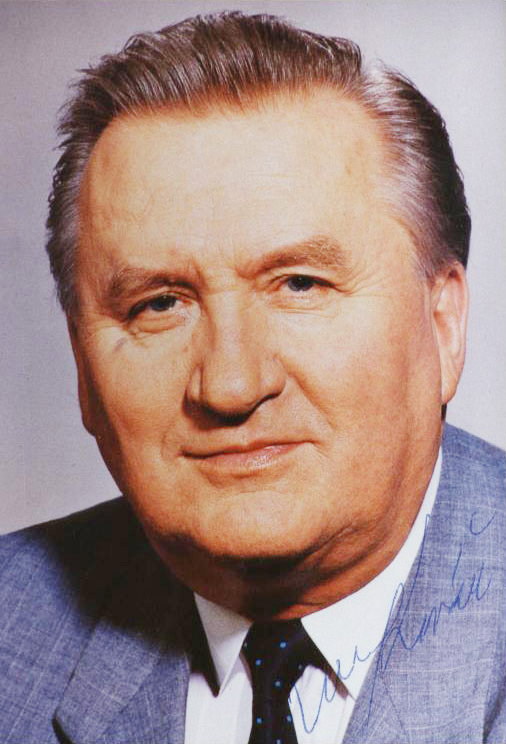

1st President of Slovakia
- In office 2 March 1993 – 2 March 1998
- Prime Minister: Vladimír Mečiar; Jozef Moravčík; Vladimír Mečiar
- Preceded by: Office established
- Succeeded by: Rudolf Schuster

7th Chairman of the Federal Assembly of Czechoslovakia
- In office 25 June – 31 December 1992
- Preceded by: Alexander Dubček
- Succeeded by: Office abolished

Finance Minister of Slovak Federal Republic
- In office 12 December 1989 – 17 May 1991
- Preceded by: František Mišeje
- Succeeded by: Anton Vavro (acting)

Personal details
- Born: 3 August 1930 Ľubiša, Czechoslovakia
- Died: 5 October 2016 (aged 86) Bratislava, Slovakia
- Party: Communist Party of Czechoslovakia (1948–1970); Public Against Violence (1990–1991); Movement for a Democratic Slovakia (1991–1993)
- Spouse: Emília Kováčová

Michal Kováč (3 August 1930 – 5 October 2016) was the first president of Slovakia, having served from 1993 through 1998.

== Early life ==
Kováč was born in the village of Ľubiša in then Czechoslovakia in 1930. He graduated from the present-day University of Economics in Bratislava and was a bank employee of the Státní banka československá and of other banks. As such, he spent some years in London and in Cuba in the 1960s. During Normalization he was subjected to some persecution.

== Political career ==
During and after the Velvet Revolution, from 12 December 1989 to 17 May 1991 (when he resigned) Kováč was the Finance Minister of the Slovak (Socialist) Republic.

In early 1991, he was one of the founders and the vice-chairman of the Movement for a Democratic Slovakia. As such, he was elected as a deputy to the Federal Assembly of Czechoslovakia in 1990. After the 1992 election he served as the Chairman of the Federal Assembly from 25 June to 31 December 1992. He played an important role in the process of the preparation of the Dissolution of Czechoslovakia.

=== President (1993–1998) ===
Kováč was elected president by the National Council of Slovakia in February 1993 (because he was a candidate of the biggest parliamentary party—the Movement for a Democratic Slovakia) and inaugurated on 2 March 1993. He soon became a strong opponent of Prime Minister Vladimír Mečiar and by giving a critical presidential address to parliament in March 1994, Kováč significantly contributed to the deposition of the then Mečiar government and the creation of the Moravčík government (which only lasted until the next parliamentary election in the autumn of 1994).

In 1995 the Mečiar-Kováč conflict intensified and the Movement for a Democratic Slovakia cancelled Kováč's (formal) membership in the party. In August 1995 Kováč's son, who had been accused of financial crimes by German authorities (the accusation was later withdrawn), was kidnapped and taken to Austria. The president, opposition parties and Austrian court accused the Slovak intelligence service (SIS) and the government of having organized the kidnapping. The investigation of new secret intelligence service director Mitro and Slovak police after collapse of Mečiar's regime in the end of 1998 confirmed the participation of the SIS in the abduction, but Slovak courts rejected the trial of its suspected actors because of an amnesty issued by Mečiar on 3 March 1998. This amnesty was revoked in 2017 and in a case over a potential European Arrest Warrant, the European Court of Justice was asked to rule on the legality of the proceedings against the suspected kidnappers (case C‑203/20).

Kováč's term ended on 2 March 1998. His candidature in the first direct 1999 Slovak presidential election was unsuccessful. He mostly withdrew from politics afterwards and appeared only at a few symbolic events.

== Health and death ==
In 2008, Kováč stated in an interview with Slovak media outlet Plus 7 dní that he suffered Parkinson's disease. On 5 October 2016, he died from complications of said disease in Bratislava at the age of 86.

== Honours ==
- Slovakia: Grand Master and Grand Cross (or 1st Class) of the Order of the White Double Cross.
- Poland: Grand Cross of the Order of Merit of the Republic of Poland (1994)
- Poland: Order of the White Eagle (1997)
- Italy: Knight Grand Cross with Collar of the Order of Merit of the Italian Republic (1997)
- Sovereign Military Order of Malta: Collar of the Order pro Merito Melitensi (1997)
- Bulgaria: Grand Cross of the Order of the Balkan Mountains (1997)
- In 1993, Kováč became the first winner of the Golden Biatec Award, the highest award bestowed by Slovakia’s Informal Economic Forum – Economic Club.

Political offices
Preceded by Vladimír Mečiar as acting President	President of Slovakia; 1993–1998	Succeeded by Vladimír Mečiar as acting President
