= Vladimír Mečiar =

Prime Minister of Slovakia (1990–1991; 1992–1994; 1994–1998)

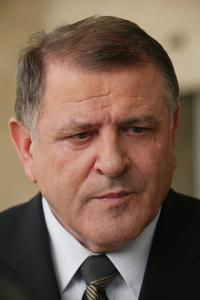
- Mečiar in 2004

Acting President of Slovakia
- In office 2 March 1998 – 30 October 1998 Serving with Ivan Gašparovič
- Prime Minister: Himself
- Preceded by: Michal Kováč
- Succeeded by: Mikuláš Dzurinda (acting); Jozef Migaš (acting)
- In office 1 January 1993 – 2 March 1993
- Prime Minister: Himself
- Preceded by: Position established
- Succeeded by: Michal Kováč

Prime Minister of Slovakia
- In office 13 December 1994 – 30 October 1998
- President: Michal Kováč
- Preceded by: Jozef Moravčík
- Succeeded by: Mikuláš Dzurinda
- In office 24 June 1992 – 16 March 1994
- President: Michal Kováč
- Preceded by: Ján Čarnogurský
- Succeeded by: Jozef Moravčík
- In office 27 June 1990 – 6 May 1991
- Preceded by: Milan Čič
- Succeeded by: Ján Čarnogurský

Minister of the Interior
- In office 11 January 1990 – 27 June 1990
- Prime Minister: Milan Čič
- Preceded by: Milan Čič
- Succeeded by: Anton Andráš

Member of the National Council
- In office 15 October 2002 – 12 June 2010
- In office 16 March 1994 – 13 December 1994

Personal details
- Born: 26 July 1942 (age 84) Zvolen, Slovakia
- Party: KSČ (until 1970); Independent (1970–1989); VPN (1989–1991); ĽS–HZDS (1991–2013)
- Spouse: Margita Mečiarová
- Education: Comenius University in Bratislava

Vladimír Mečiar (Note: Slovak pronunciation: [ˈʋlaɟimiːr ˈmetʂɪɐr]) (born 26 July 1942) is a Slovak former politician who served as the prime minister of Slovakia from June 1990 to May 1991, June 1992 to March 1994, and again from December 1994 to October 1998. He was the leader of the Movement for a Democratic Slovakia (HZDS), a populist party in Slovakia.

Mečiar led Slovakia during the dissolution of Czechoslovakia in 1992–93 and was one of the leading presidential candidates in Slovakia in 1999 and 2004. During his time in office, he was criticized for his autocratic style of governance and connections to organized crime, which became known as Mečiarizmus ("Mečiarism").

== Early life ==
Mečiar was born in Zvolen in 1942 as the eldest of four boys. His father was a tailor, and his mother was a housewife.

== Career ==
=== Early period ===
Starting in the Communist Party of Slovakia, the only road to prominence in Communist Czechoslovakia, he became committee chairman in the town of Žiar nad Hronom, only to be dismissed in the year after the 1968 Warsaw Pact invasion of Czechoslovakia, when he delivered a pro-reform speech to the National Congress in 1969 and was thrown out. A year later he was also expelled from the Communist Party and then added to the Communist Party Central Committee's long list of enemies of the socialist regime. He put himself through the Faculty of Law of the Comenius University while working in a glass factory.

=== Velvet Revolution ===
In late 1989, during the fast-paced anti-Communist Velvet Revolution, he joined the new political party, Public Against Violence (Verejnosť proti násiliu, VPN), which was the Slovak counterpart to the better-known Czech Civic Forum. On 11 January 1990, when the VPN was looking for professionals to participate in the government of Slovakia, Mečiar was appointed as Minister of the Interior and Environment of Slovakia on a recommendation of Alexander Dubček, who was impressed by Mečiar's thorough knowledge in all relevant fields.

== Prime minister ==
=== First term ===
After the first democratic elections in Czechoslovakia in June 1990, he was named Slovak prime minister (representing the VPN) of a coalition government of VPN and the Christian Democratic Movement. He advocated economic reform and continued federation with the Czechs.

In 1990 the political landscape of the Czech Republic and Slovakia started to develop and many new political parties were formed, mainly from the Civic Forum and the VPN. By the end of 1990, some of Mečiar's partners in the VPN began distancing themselves from him. First, the party split into two fractions in early March 1991: Mečiar supporters (mostly members of his cabinet) and Mečiar opponents (led by the VPN chairman Fedor Gál). On 23 April 1991, the Presidium of the Slovak parliament (Slovak National Council) deposed him as premier of Slovakia and he was replaced by Ján Čarnogurský, the leader of the Christian Democratic Movement. Three days later, the VPN officially split in two: the Movement for a Democratic Slovakia (HZDS) and the remaining VPN (since October 1991 called ODÚ-VPN, later just ODÚ). Mečiar was elected HZDS chairman in June 1991.

=== Second term ===
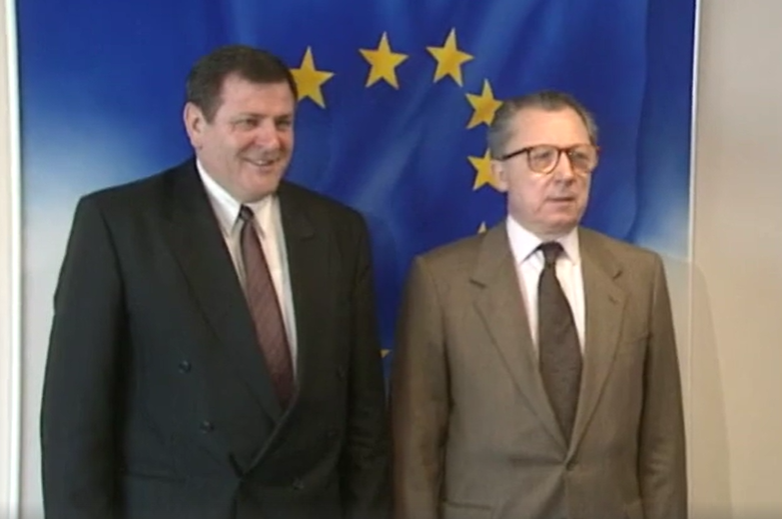
Mečiar meeting with Jacques Delors, president of the European Commission (1993)

In 1991 and 1992, there were frequent, but fruitless, negotiations between the Czech Republic and Slovak Republic concerning the future relations between the two constituent republics of Czechoslovakia. The winners of the June 1992 elections in Czechoslovakia and new prime ministers were the Civic Democratic Party led by Václav Klaus in the Czech Republic and the HZDS led by Vladimír Mečiar in Slovakia. Before and shortly after this election, the HZDS supported the creation of a looser federation—a confederation—between the two republics. However, its Czech counterpart wanted an even more centralized Czechoslovakia than was the case in 1992 or two separate countries. Since these two concepts were irreconcilable, Mečiar and Klaus agreed (after intense negotiations, but without having consulted the population in a referendum) on 23 July in Bratislava to dissolve Czechoslovakia and to create two independent states. As a result, Mečiar and Klaus became the prime ministers of two independent states on 1 January 1993. Mečiar also opposed the free-market shock therapy proposed by Prague and Klaus' party to all of Czechoslovakia.

After eight members of the parliament left the HZDS in March 1993, Mečiar lost his parliamentary majority. At the same time Mečiar's HZDS also lost the support of the president, Michal Kováč, who was originally nominated by the HZDS. However, it was only in March 1994 that he was unseated as prime minister by the parliament (National Council of the Slovak Republic) and the opposition parties created a new government under Jozef Moravčík's lead. However, after the elections held at the turn of September and October 1994, in which his HZDS won 35% of the votes, he became prime minister again — in a coalition with the far-right Slovak National Party headed by the controversial Ján Slota, and the radical-left Združenie robotníkov Slovenska headed by the colourful Ján Ľupták, a mason.

=== Third term ===
During the following period, he was constantly criticized by his opponents and Western countries for an autocratic style of administration, lack of respect for democracy, misuse of state media for propaganda, corruption and the shady privatization of national companies that occurred during his rule. Privatization during the 1990s in both Slovakia and the Czech Republic was harmed by widespread unlawful asset stripping (also described by the journalistic term of tunnelling).

At the same time relations between Mečiar and the president of Slovakia, Michal Kováč were rather strained. He was also blamed for having engaged the Slovak secret service (SIS) in the abduction of the president's son Michal Kováč, Jr. — wanted on a warrant for a financial crime in Germany — to Hainburg, Austria, in August 1995, but his guilt has not been proven. However, after Kovač's term expired in March 1998 the Slovak parliament was unable to elect a successor, so Mečiar also temporarily assumed the role of acting president. As president, he issued an amnesty for some of those accused of the abduction. As a result, Slovakia under his rule became partially isolated from the West and the pace of EU and NATO accession negotiations was much slower than in the case of neighboring countries, although Mečiar supported both EU and NATO memberships for his country and submitted Slovakia's applications to both organisations.

Mečiar and HZDS narrowly finished first in the 1998 elections, with 27% of the votes. However, he was unable to create a coalition, and Mikuláš Dzurinda from the opposition became the new prime minister. Afterwards, Mečiar was one of the two leading candidates for the first direct election of the president of Slovakia in 1999, but he was defeated by Rudolf Schuster. In 2000, Mečiar's HZDS was renamed "People's Party — Movement for a Democratic Slovakia".

== Post-premiership ==
In 2000 Mečiar ostensibly gave up his political ambitions. His HZDS colleague Augustín Marián Húska said: "The NATO-War against Yugoslavia in 1999 was also a signal to us, to not pursue any vision of political independence anymore. We have seen what will happen to forces that want to be independent." In 2000, Mečiar was arrested by Slovak police on charges of fraud dating from his term in office.

Mečiar was heavily favored to win the 2002 election, but it was thought that if he became prime minister again, it would end any chance of Slovakia getting into the EU. The 2002 elections saw the HZDS score a high percentage (20%) again. However, as in 1998, no other party was willing to serve under him. The result was another term in government for Dzurinda. The lower percentage of Mečiar's HZDS (20%) compared to the 1998 result (27%) was due to internal disputes within the organization shortly before the election, which caused many traditional HZDS members to leave the party. Some of them created the HZD (Movement for Democracy) party led by Ivan Gašparovič. In 2003, further traditional HZDS members left the party and most of them created the People's Union (Ľudová únia).

In the 2004 presidential election, Mečiar tried to become Slovak president again, but was defeated in the second round by his former, long-standing ally Ivan Gašparovič. In the 2006 parliamentary election in Slovakia, HZDS had the worst election result in its history, just 8.79%. Mečiar requested an examination of the election results. While HZDS became part of Robert Fico's coalition, Mečiar was not a Cabinet member. He declined to participate in the 2009 presidential election but also denied considering political retirement.

In the 2010 parliamentary election, Mečiar's HZDS dropped to 4%, leaving it out of parliament for the first time in its history. In the 2012 elections, the HZDS saw its vote collapse to 0.93%, leaving it again outside of parliament. Eventually, the party was dissolved in 2014.

== Personal life ==
His wife Margita is a medical doctor, and they have three children.

== See also ==
- List of political parties in Slovakia
- List of presidents of Slovakia
- List of prime ministers of Slovakia
- Ivan Lexa
- Jaroslav Svěchota

Political offices
Preceded by Milan Čič	Prime Minister of Slovakia; 1990–1991	Succeeded by Ján Čarnogurský
Preceded by Ján Čarnogurský	Prime Minister of Slovakia; 1992–1994	Succeeded by Jozef Moravčík
New creation	President of Slovakia; Acting; 1993	Succeeded by Michal Kováč
Preceded by Jozef Moravčík	Prime Minister of Slovakia; 1994–1998	Succeeded by Mikuláš Dzurinda
Preceded by Michal Kováč	President of Slovakia; Acting; 1998; Served alongside: Ivan Gašparovič (Acting)	Succeeded by Mikuláš Dzurinda; Acting
Preceded by Michal Kováč	President of Slovakia; Acting; 1998; Served alongside: Ivan Gašparovič (Acting)	Succeeded by Jozef Migaš; Acting
