= Movement for Democracy (Slovakia) =

Movement for Democracy Hnutie za demokraciu
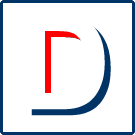
- Founded: 12 July 2002
- Dissolved: 9 March 2021
- Split from: HZDS
- Succeeded by: Republic
- Headquarters: Bratislava
- Ideology: Slovak nationalism Populism; Conservatism
- European affiliation: Alliance for Europe of the Nations (2004–2009)

The Movement for Democracy (Slovak: Hnutie za demokraciu) was a political party in Slovakia created in 2002 when it split from the Movement for a Democratic Slovakia. From 2002 to 2004 the first leader of the party was Ivan Gašparovič, who served as president of Slovakia from 2004 to 2014. The leader since 2004 was Jozef Grapa.

In the parliamentary election of 17 June 2006, the party won 0.6% of the popular vote and lost parliamentary representation. Movement for Democracy was part of the Alliance for Europe of the Nations from 2002 to 2009.

After 2010, the party became inactive, but not formally disbanded. Its shell was taken over by former founding member Peter Marček who renamed it to "Voice of the People" (Hlas Ľudu) in December 2018. The party was later renamed to Republic.

== Leaders ==
No.	Name	Photo	Since	Until
1	Ivan Gašparovič		12 July 2002	17 April 2004
2	Jozef Grapa		17 April 2004	12 December 2018
3	Peter Marček		12 December 2018	21 December 2018

== See also ==
- List of political parties in Slovakia

== Party site ==
- Official website of the Movement for Democracy (archived in 2008)
