= Mečiar's Second Cabinet =

Cabinet of Slovakia, 1992 to 1994

- 1st Cabinet of Slovakia
- 24 June 1992 – 15 March 1994
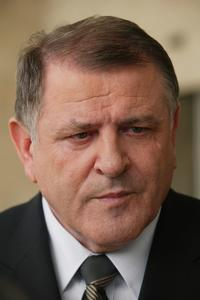
- Vladimír Mečiar in 2004
- Date formed: 24 June 1992
- Date dissolved: 15 March 1994

People and organisations
- Head of state: Václav Havel (1992); Jan Stráský (1992, acting); Vladimír Mečiar (1993, acting); Michal Kováč (1993–1994)
- Head of government: Vladimír Mečiar
- Head of government's history: 1990–1991
- No. of ministers: 18
- Ministers removed: 8
- Total no. of members: 26
- Member party: HZDS; SNS
- Status in legislature: Majority Coalition (1992–1994); Minority Coalition (1994)
- Opposition party: SDĽ; KDH; MKM – EGY
- Opposition leader: Peter Weiss

History
- Incoming formation: 1992
- Outgoing formation: 1994
- Election: 1992 Slovak parliamentary election
- Predecessor: Čarnogurský's Cabinet
- Successor: Moravčík's Cabinet

Between 24 June 1992 and 15 March 1994, prime minister of Slovakia Vladimír Mečiar formed his second cabinet in his second consecutive term in this office. Slovakia became an independent sovereign state on 1 January 1993 and thus this government was the first one after the dissolution of Czechoslovakia. On 11 March 1994, Mečiar's second cabinet suffered defeat in a parliamentary vote of no confidence, 78–2–2, in the 150-seat NR SR after President Michal Kováč criticized Mečiar's governing methods, leading to a vote of no confidence in parliament and a defection of a third of HZDS deputies, who later reformed as a new party, the Democratic Union (DU).

== Government ministers ==
Office	Minister	Political Party	In office
Prime Minister	Vladimír Mečiar	HZDS	24 June 1992 – 15 March 1994
Minister of Transport, Posts and Telecommunications	Roman Hofbauer	HZDS	24 June 1992 – 15 March 1994
Minister of Labour, Social Affairs and Family	Oľga Keltošová	HZDS	24 June 1992 – 15 March 1994
Minister of Finance	Július Tóth	HZDS	24 June 1992 – 15 March 1994
Minister of Economy	Ľudovít Černák	SNS	24 June 1992 – 19 March 1993
Minister of Economy	Jaroslav Kubečka	HZDS	19 March 1993 – 10 November 1993
Minister of Economy	Ján Ducký	HZDS	10 November 1993 – 15 March 1994
Minister of Agriculture	Peter Baco	HZDS	24 June 1992 – 15 March 1994
Minister of Interior	Jozef Tuchyňa	HZDS	24 June 1992 – 15 March 1994
Minister of Defence	Imrich Andrejčák	HZDS	24 June 1992 – 15 March 1994
Minister of Justice	Katarína Tóthová	HZDS	24 June 1992 – 15 March 1994
Minister of Education	Dušan Slobodník (acting)	HZDS	24 June 1992 – 26 September 1992
Minister of Education	Matúš Kučera	HZDS	26 September 1992 – 22 June 1993
Minister of Education	Roman Kováč (acting)	HZDS	22 June 1993 – 10 November 1993
Minister of Education	Jaroslav Paška	SNS	10 November 1993 – 15 March 1994
Minister of Culture	Dušan Slobodník	HZDS	24 June 1992 – 15 March 1994
Minister of Health	Viliam Soboňa	HZDS	24 June 1992 – 24 November 1993
Minister of Health	Irena Belohorská	HZDS	24 November 1993 – 15 March 1994
Minister of Foreign Affairs	Milan Kňažko	HZDS	24 June 1992 – 19 March 1993
Minister of Foreign Affairs	Jozef Moravčík	HZDS	19 March 1993 – 15 March 1994
Minister for Administration and Privatisation of National Property	Ľubomír Dolgoš	HZDS	24 June 1992 – 19 March 1993
Minister for Administration and Privatisation of National Property	Vladimír Mečiar (acting)	HZDS	19 March 1993 – 15 March 1994
Minister of Envirovment	Jozef Zlocha	HZDS	24 June 1992 – 15 March 1994
Minister of State Control	Roman Kováč (acting)	HZDS	24 June 1992 – 15 March 1994

=== Deputy Prime Ministers ===
Minister	Political Party	In office	Notes
Roman Kováč	HZDS	24 June 1992 – 15 March 1994	
Milan Kňažko	HZDS	24 June 1992 – 25 February 1994	
Marián Andel	SNS	24 June 1992 – 10 November 1993	
Jozef Prokeš	SNS	24 June 1992 – 10 November 1993	

== Party composition ==
Party	Ideology	Leader	Deputies	Ministers
HZDS	Slovak nationalism	Vladimír Mečiar	74 / 150	15 / 18
SNS	Ultranationalism	Jozef Prokeš	15 / 150	3 / 18
Total			89 / 150	18
