= Mečiar's Third Cabinet =

Cabinet of Slovakia, 1994 to 1998

- 3rd Cabinet of Slovakia
- 13 December 1994 – 30 October 1998
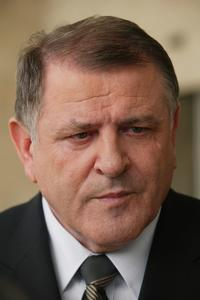
- Vladimír Mečiar in 2004
- Date formed: 13 December 1994
- Date dissolved: 30 October 1998

People and organisations
- Head of state: Michal Kováč (1994–1998); Vladimír Mečiar (1998, acting); Ivan Gašparovič (1998, acting)
- Head of government: Vladimír Mečiar
- Head of government's history: 1990–1991; 1992–1994
- No. of ministers: 18
- Ministers removed: 6
- Total no. of members: 24
- Member party: HZDS; RSS; ZRS; SNS
- Status in legislature: Majority Coalition
- Opposition party: SV; KDH; SMK; DEÚS
- Opposition leader: Peter Weiss (1994–1996); Robert Fico (1996–1998)

History
- Election: 1994 Slovak parliamentary election
- Incoming formation: 1994
- Outgoing formation: 1998
- Predecessor: Moravčík's Cabinet
- Successor: Dzurinda's First Cabinet

Between 13 December 1994 and 30 October 1998, prime minister of Slovakia Vladimír Mečiar formed his third and final term in this office. It was the first government to be formed in Slovakia after the dissolution of Czechoslovakia.

== Government ministers ==
Office	Minister	Political Party	In office
Prime Minister	Vladimír Mečiar	HZDS	13 December 1994 – 30 October 1998
Minister of Transport, Posts and Telecommunications	Alexander Rezeš	HZDS	13 December 1994 – 15 April 1997
Minister of Transport, Posts and Telecommunications	Ján Jasovský	HZDS	15 April 1997 – 30 October 1998
Minister of Labour, Social Affairs and Family	Oľga Keltošová	HZDS	13 December 1994 – 27 February 1998
Minister of Labour, Social Affairs and Family	Vojtech Tkáč	HZDS	27 February 1998 – 30 October 1998
Minister of Finance	Sergej Kozlík	HZDS	13 December 1994 – 14 January 1998
Minister of Finance	Miroslav Maxon	RSS	14 January 1998 – 30 October 1998
Minister of Economy	Ján Ducký	HZDS	13 December 1994 – 27 August 1996
Minister of Economy	Karol Česnek	HZDS	27 August 1996 – 27 February 1998
Minister of Economy	Milan Cagala	HZDS	27 February 1998 – 30 October 1998
Minister of Agriculture	Peter Baco	HZDS	13 December 1994 – 30 October 1998
Minister of Interior	Ľudovít Hudek	HZDS	13 December 1994 – 27 August 1996
Minister of Interior	Gustáv Krajči	HZDS	27 August 1996 – 30 October 1998
Minister of Defence	Ján Sitek	SNS	13 December 1994 – 30 October 1998
Minister of Justice	Jozef Liščák	ZRS	13 December 1994 – 30 October 1998
Minister of Education	Eva Slavkovská	SNS	13 December 1994 – 30 October 1998
Minister of Culture	Ivan Hudec	HZDS	13 December 1994 – 30 October 1998
Minister of Health	Ľubomír Javorský	HZDS	13 December 1994 – 30 October 1998
Minister of Foreign Affairs	Juraj Schenk	HZDS	13 December 1994 – 27 August 1996
Minister of Foreign Affairs	Pavol Hamžík	HZDS	27 August 1996 – 11 June 1997
Minister of Foreign Affairs	Zdenka Kramplová	HZDS	11 June 1997 – 6 October 1998
Minister of Foreign Affairs	Jozef Kalman (acting)	ZRS	6 October 1998 – 30 October 1998
Minister for Administration and Privatisation of National Property	Peter Bisák	ZRS	13 December 1994 – 30 October 1998
Minister of Environment	Jozef Zlocha	HZDS	13 December 1994 – 30 October 1998
Minister of Construction and Public Work	Ján Mráz	ZRS	13 December 1994 – 30 October 1998

=== Deputy Prime Ministers ===
Minister	Political Party	In office	Notes
Katarína Tóthová	HZDS	13 December 1994 – 30 October 1998	
Sergej Kozlík	HZDS	13 December 1994 – 30 October 1998	
Marián Andel	SNS	13 December 1994 – 30 October 1998	

== Party composition ==
Party	Ideology	Leader	Deputies	Ministers
HZDS	Slovak nationalism	Vladimír Mečiar	61 / 150	13 / 18
ZRS	Slovak nationalism	Ján Ľupták	13 / 150	3 / 18
SNS	Ultranationalism	Ján Slota	9 / 150	2 / 18
Total			83 / 150	18

== Issues ==
=== Slovak Night of the Long Knives ===
On 3 and 4 November 1994. All 150 MPs and President Michal Kováč participated. After the swearing-in of deputies, the elections of the chairmen of the committees of the NR SR and their members followed, violating the agreement of the political parties on the principle of proportional representation in the National Assembly of the Slovak Republic. In the secret ballot, Ivan Gašparovič was elected as the chairman of the NR SR, and Augustín Marián Húska and Ján Ľupták as vice-chairmen. Both meetings were chaired by Ivan Gašparovič, who was also the chairman of the National Assembly of the Slovak Republic in the previous election period.

In 11 parliamentary committees, the silent coalition of HZDS – ZRS – SNS, which had a total of 83 deputies, occupied all the chairs (HZDS-RSS eight, ZRS two and SNS one). The majority of opposition MPs were assigned to the Committee on the Environment and Nature Conservation at the suggestion of coalition MPs (mainly Oľga Keltošová). For example, Juraj Švec, the Rector of Comenius University, was transferred from the Committee on Education, Science, Culture and Sports to this committee. “When assigning MPs to committees, it was often a matter of sweet revenge,” wrote Ján Smolec, a then HZDS MP and editor-in-chief of the daily Slovenská republika.

The 2nd session of the National Council of the Slovak Republic began at 11:07 p.m. The silent coalition of HZDS – ZRS – SNS, which had a total of 83 MPs, began to implement its idea of “democracy” under the slogan “The winner takes all”. Coalition MPs expressed no confidence in the Minister of the Interior, Ladislav Pittner, and the Minister of Privatization, Milan Janičin, despite the fact that the government of Jozef Moravčík had already resigned. After this act, only three opposition MPs remained in the chamber. 83 coalition lawmakers negotiated all night. In the end, only one opposition MP – SDĽ Deputy Chairman Robert Fico – stood with them.

Coalition MPs dismissed all members of the Slovak Television and Radio Council and elected new ones, they also dismissed the Chairman of the Supreme Audit Office Jozef Olej and Deputy Chairman Milan Hudan, Prosecutor General Vojtech Bach and elected Ľudovít Hudek as the new Chairman. They also dismissed all members of the Presidium and Supervisory Board of the National Property Fund, and elected Štefan Gavorník as the new Chairman of the Presidium of the National Property Fund.

At 5:15 in the morning, coalition MPs adopted the law on the repeal of government decisions on the privatization of enterprises after September 6, 1994. It appointed new members of the special parliamentary control body to control the activities of the SIS. Ivan Lexa became its Chairman.

A temporary commission was also created to examine the legality of the election of deputies for the Democratic Union of Slovakia. The commission was headed by Dušan Macuška. Two commissions were unconstitutionally created to investigate the cause of the fall of the second Mečiar government in March 1994. The vote on the personnel change in the position of the central director of STV and Slovak Radio was the last item on the agenda. Vladimír Štefko was dismissed from the position of director of Slovak Radio and Ján Tužinský was elected.

The night when, after twelve hours of deliberation, coalition deputies recalled officials from state bodies over which the parliament has influence and installed their own people there was described by some (e.g. Béla Bugár) as the Slovak Night of the Long Knives. 38 people were dismissed from important state positions. The takeover of parliament was only the beginning of a massive offensive that Mečiar launched that night. Only later did his opponents understand that this was an attempt to "take over the entire state".

On November 24, 1994, the European Union expressed concern over the course of both meetings, while in addition to the opposition, the broad professional and lay public also expressed doubts.

The course of the meeting confirmed the words that Mečiar had said at a meeting of HZDS representatives at the VSŽ recreational facility in Zlatá Idka near Košice a year earlier - on November 27 and 28, 1993, and which were published transcribed in the daily Slovenský východ:

=== Kidnapping of President's son ===
In 1995 the Mečiar-Kováč conflict intensified and the Movement for a Democratic Slovakia cancelled Kováč's (formal) membership in the party. In August 1995 Kováč's son, who had been accused of financial crimes by German authorities (the accusation was later withdrawn), was kidnapped and taken to Austria. The president, opposition parties and Austrian court accused the Slovak intelligence service (SIS) and the government of having organized the kidnapping. The investigation of new secret intelligence service director Mitro and Slovak police after collapse of Mečiar's regime in the end of 1998 confirmed the participation of the SIS in the abduction, but Slovak courts rejected the trial of its suspected actors because of an amnesty issued by Mečiar on 3 March 1998. This amnesty was revoked in 2017 and in a case over a potential European Arrest Warrant, the European Court of Justice was asked to rule on the legality of the proceedings against the suspected kidnappers (case C‑203/20).

=== Manipulation of 1997 Referendum ===
By holding the referendums on the same day, President Kováč sought to increase the chance of overcoming the 50% quorum for the vote to be legally binding. However, the government interpreted a ruling by the Constitutional Court tendentiously, asserting that, because the referendum couldn't be binding on the constitution, and because the appendix to the fourth question of the referendum did not contain its detailed explanation as the "referendum law" requested (no. 564/1992), the presidential election vote should be cancelled: despite the court's own ruling that this interpretation does not and may not have any influence on this referendum and that referendums already accepted by the President could not be cancelled for that reason. The government distributed ballot papers without the fourth question, but some district electoral commissioners refused to accept ballot papers that didn't include it.

As a result, the opposition urged its supporters to boycott the referendum, which was successful, with only 9.5% of people turning out. The turnout fell far short of the 50% required, and the referendum was declared invalid. On 26 May, in protest at the government's handling of the referendum, the Foreign Minister, Pavol Hamžík, resigned. In July 1997, NATO confirmed that they were inviting the Czech Republic, Hungary, and Poland to become members, but not Slovakia. A week later, the European Commission did likewise: refusing to invite Slovakia to join the European Union, due to failing the 'democratic criteria', but inviting the three surrounding countries, Estonia, and Slovenia.

=== Assassination of Róbert Remiáš ===
The assassination of Róbert Remiáš took place on April 29, 1996, in Karlova Ves, Bratislava, Slovakia. Remiáš, an ex-police officer, was one of the key figures in the trial against Slovak Information Service in the case of the kidnapping of the Slovak President's son into Austria from 1995. Remiáš's car was remotely detonated in the middle of a busy crossroad at Karloveská Street. There were numerous high-ranking mafia organised crime figures present at the crime scene watching the explosion, as well as Slovak Information Service operatives. The crime has never been solved. The anniversary of the assassination was often used by political parties critical of Vladimír Mečiar to call out for the annulment of his amnesties which prevented some key political crimes from the mid-1990s to be investigated.

=== New Election Law ===
Although Premier Vladimír Mečiar claimed his HZDS party would be a clear winner in the September national elections, independent analysts and opposition deputies argue that he cannot pull off such a victory by relying on purely legitimate tactics. For that reason, they say, the new election law would the governing coalition forced through during the May Parliamentary session must be seen as a document that rewrites the rules of the game in the government's favor.

Political analysts say that the law contains several troubling provisions, which in combination create significant room for manipulation of the elections. The most controversial measures concern the transfer of most of the powers of the independent Central Election Commission and local commissions to state administration bodies, and the secrecy surrounding voter lists.

"The government's arguments are phony," said political scientist Grigorij Mesežnikov, program director at the Institute for Public Affairs. Mesežnikov argued that the election law amendment was "confirmation that the ruling coalition, and mainly [Premier Vladimír Mečiar's] HZDS, will attempt to annul the results of the elections if they deprive [the ruling parties] of their political power."

Potential abuses

One of the most troublesome provisions of the new law, Mesežnikov continued, was one turning the previously independent Central Election Commission into a powerless observer controlled by the Interior Ministry. One of the duties of the Central Commission had been to supervise local election commissions, but these would now come under the authority of the Ministry as well.

The new also empowers the heads of local state administration bodies to appoint additional members to local election commissions in case political parties fail to nominate their own representatives. Under the previous law, the local commission members had been appointed by town and village mayors who, according to Mesežnikov, represented a wider political spectrum than state employees.

According to the amendment, new election commission members would be chosen from among state administration officials, who were all replaced between 1995 and 1996 by members of the current ruling parties and their cronies. "The state administration will serve the government," said Mesežnikov.

Independent analysts argue that opposition parties may have problems finding the required number of representatives for the roughly 6,000 electoral commissions around the country, thus opening the door to state officials. Peter Brňák, chairman the Parliamentary Constitutional Committee and a HZDS deputy, admitted that the system allowed for injustices in proportional representation at the local level. "On the other hand, careful preparation by the opposition for their representation on [local] commissions would put [the injustices] on a purely theoretical level," he noted.
