= Moravčík's Cabinet =

Cabinet of Slovakia, 1994 to 1994

- 2nd Cabinet of Slovakia
- 15 March 1994 – 13 December 1994
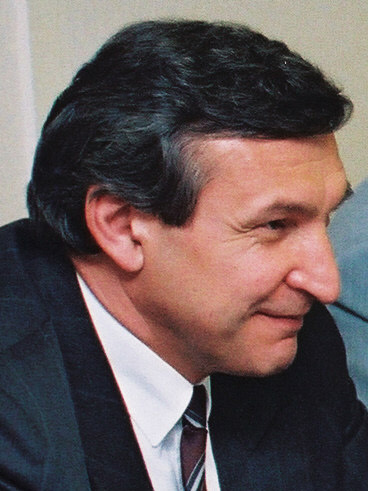
- Jozef Moravčík in 1993
- Date formed: 15 March 1994
- Date dissolved: 13 December 1994

People and organisations
- Head of state: Michal Kováč
- Head of government: Jozef Moravčík
- No. of ministers: 18
- Total no. of members: 18
- Member party: DEÚS; SDĽ; KDH; NDS
- Status in legislature: Caretakers
- Opposition party: HZDS; SNS; MKM – EGY
- Opposition leader: Vladimír Mečiar

History
- Incoming formation: 1994
- Outgoing formation: 1994
- Election: 1992 Slovak parliamentary election
- Predecessor: Mečiar's Second Cabinet
- Successor: Mečiar's Third Cabinet

Between 15 March 1994 and 13 December 1994, former foreign affairs minister of Slovakia Jozef Moravčík formed his cabinet 4 days after previous prime minister Vladimír Mečiar lost no-confidence vote on 11 March 1994. It was an interim, broad-coalition government after Vladimír Mečiar's second cabinet lost a vote of no confidence. Its primary purpose was to stabilize the political situation and manage the country until snap elections could be held.

== Government ministers ==
| Office | Minister | Political Party | In office |
|---|---|---|---|
| Prime Minister | Jozef Moravčík | DEÚS | 15 March 1994 – 13 December 1994 |
| Minister of Transport, Posts and Telecommunications | Mikuláš Dzurinda | KDH | 15 March 1994 – 13 December 1994 |
| Minister of Labour, Social Affairs and Family | Július Brocka | KDH | 15 March 1994 – 13 December 1994 |
| Minister of Finance | Rudolf Filkus | DEÚS | 15 March 1994 – 13 December 1994 |
| Minister of Economy | Peter Magvaši | SDĽ | 15 March 1994 – 13 December 1994 |
| Minister of Agriculture | Pavol Koncoš | SDĽ | 15 March 1994 – 13 December 1994 |
| Minister of Interior | Ladislav Pittner | KDH | 15 March 1994 – 13 December 1994 (Note: Lost No-Confidence vote on 3 November 1994) |
| Minister of Defence | Pavol Kanis | SDĽ | 15 March 1994 – 13 December 1994 |
| Minister of Justice | Milan Hanzel | SDĽ | 15 March 1994 – 13 December 1994 |
| Minister of Education | Ľubomír Harach | SDĽ | 15 March 1994 – 13 December 1994 |
| Minister of Culture | Ľubomír Roman | KDH | 15 March 1994 – 13 December 1994 |
| Minister of Health | Tibor Šagát | DEÚS | 15 March 1994 – 13 December 1994 |
| Minister of Foreign Affairs | Eduard Kukan | KDH | 15 March 1994 – 13 December 1994 |
| Minister for Administration and Privatisation of National Property | Milan Janičina | NDS | 15 March 1994 – 13 December 1994 (Note: Lost No-Confidence vote on 3 November 1994) |
| Minister of Environment | Juraj Hraško | SDĽ | 15 March 1994 – 13 December 1994 |

=== Deputy Prime Ministers ===
| Minister | Political Party | In office | Notes |
|---|---|---|---|
| Roman Kováč | DEÚS | 15 March 1994 – 13 December 1994 | |
| Brigita Schmögnerová | SDĽ | 15 March 1994 – 13 December 1994 | |
| Ivan Šimko | KDH | 15 March 1994 – 13 December 1994 | |

== Party composition ==
| Party | Ideology | Leader | Deputies | Ministers |
|---|---|---|---|---|
| DEÚS | Liberal conservatism | Jozef Moravčík | 32 / 150 | 3 / 15 |
| SDĽ | Social democracy | Peter Weiss | 29 / 150 | 6 / 15 |
| KDH | Christian democracy | Ján Čarnogurský | 18 / 150 | 5 / 15 |
| NDS | National conservatism | Ľudovít Černák | 6 / 150 | 1 / 15 |
| Total | | | 85 / 150 | 15 |
