= Dzurinda's First Cabinet =

- 4th Cabinet of Slovakia
- 30 October 1998 – 15 October 2002
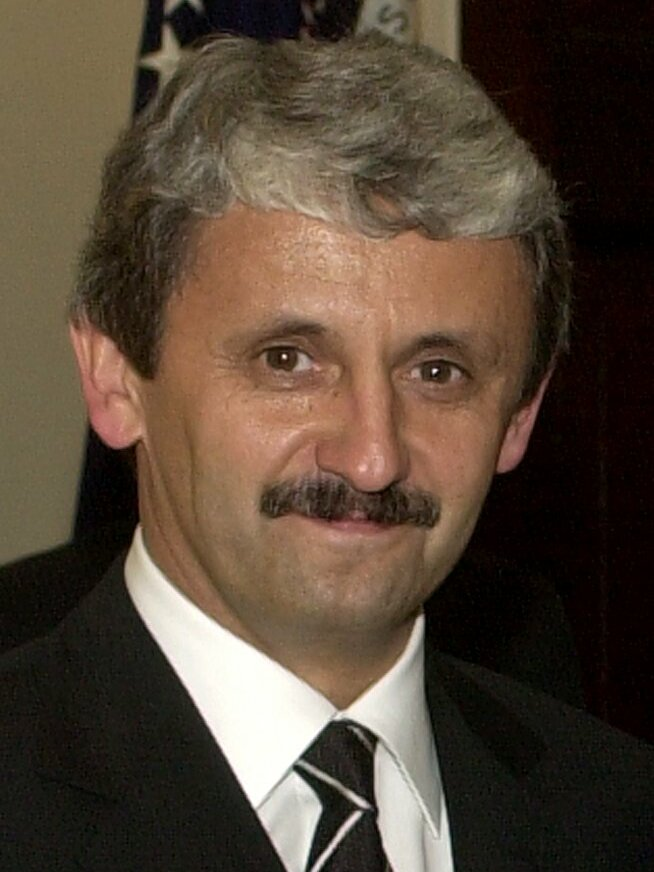
- Mikuláš Dzurinda in 2008
- Date established: 30 October 1998
- Date dissolved: 15 October 2002

Leadership and composition
- Head of state: Mikuláš Dzurinda (1998–1999, acting); Jozef Migaš (1998–1999, acting); Rudolf Schuster (1999–2002)
- Head of government: Mikuláš Dzurinda
- No. of ministers: 15
- Ministers removed: 8
- Total no. of members: 23
- Member party: SDK (1998–2000); SDKÚ (2000–2002); KDH (2000–2002); SDĽ; SOP; SMK
- Status in legislature: Supermajority Coalition
- Opposition party: HZDS; SNS; PSNS (2001–2002); HZD (2002)
- Opposition leader: Vladimír Mečiar; Ivan Gašparovič

Formation and history
- Incoming formation: 1998
- Election: 1998 Slovak parliamentary election
- Outgoing formation: 2002
- Predecessor: Mečiar's Third Cabinet
- Successor: Dzurinda's Second Cabinet

Between 30 October 1998 and 15 October 2002, prime minister of Slovakia Mikuláš Dzurinda formed his first term in this office. It was the first supermajority government to be formed in Slovakia after the first Pyrrhic Electoral Victory for Vladimír Mečiar and his HZDS. This government allowed them to adopt of a constitution or a constitutional statute such as constitutional amendment for direct elections instead of indirect elections in 1999.

== Government ministers ==
Office	Minister	Political Party	In office
Prime Minister	Mikuláš Dzurinda	SDK	30 October 1998 – 15 October 2002
Minister of Transport, Posts and Telecommunications	Gabriel Palacka	SDK	30 October 1998 – 11 August 1999
Minister of Transport, Posts and Telecommunications	Jozef Macejko	SDK	12 August 1999 – 22 June 2002
Minister of Transport, Posts and Telecommunications	Ivan Mikloš	SDKÚ	22 June 2002 – 15 October 2002
Minister of Labour, Social Affairs and Family	Pavol Magvaši	SDĽ	30 October 1998 – 2 January 2001
Minister of Finance	Brigita Schmögnerová	SDĽ	30 October 1998 – 29 January 2002
Minister of Finance	František Hajnovič	SDĽ	29 January 2002 – 15 October 2002
Minister of Economy	Ľudovít Černák	SDK	30 October 1998 – 20 October 1999
Minister of Economy	Ľubomír Harach	SDK	21 October 1999 – 15 October 2002
Minister of Agriculture	Pavol Koncoš	SDĽ	30 October 1998 – 15 October 2002
Minister of Interior	Ladislav Pittner	SDK	30 October 1998 – 14 May 2001
Minister of Interior	Ivan Šimko	SDKÚ	14 May 2001 – 15 October 2002
Minister of Defence	Pavol Kanis	SDĽ	30 October 1998 – 2 January 2001
Minister of Defence	Jozef Stank	SDĽ	2 January 2001 – 15 October 2002
Minister of Justice	Ján Čarnogurský	SDK	30 October 1998 – 15 October 2002
Minister of Foreign Affairs	Eduard Kukan	SDK	30 October 1998 – 15 October 2002
Minister of Education	Milan Ftáčnik	SDĽ	30 October 1998 – 18 April 2002
Minister of Education	Peter Ponický	SDĽ	18 April 2002 – 15 October 2002
Minister of Culture	Milan Kňažko	SDK	30 October 1998 – 15 October 2002
Minister of Health	Tibor Šagát	SDK	30 October 1998 – 10 July 2000
Minister of Health	Roman Kováč	SDK	10 July 2000 – 15 October 2002
Minister of Construction	István Harna	SMK	30 October 1998 – 15 October 2002
Minister of the Environment	László Miklós	SMK	30 October 1998 – 15 October 2002
Minister for Administration and Privatisation of National Property	Mária Machová	SOP	30 October 1998 – 15 October 2002

=== Deputy Prime Ministers ===
Minister	Political Party	In office	Notes
Pál Csáky	SMK	30 October 1998 – 15 October 2002	Deputy Prime Minister of Human Rights and Minorities
Ivan Mikloš	SDK	30 October 1998 – 15 October 2002	
Ľubomír Fogaš	SDĽ	30 October 1998 – 15 October 2002	
Mária Kadlečíková	SOP	30 October 1998 – 4 May 2001	
Pavol Hamžík	SOP	4 May 2001 – 15 October 2002	Replaced Mária Kadlečíková

== Party composition ==
Party	Ideology	Leader	Deputies	Ministers
SDK	Christian democracy	Mikuláš Dzurinda	42 / 150	9 / 21
SDĽ	Social democracy	Jozef Migaš	23 / 150	6 / 21
SMK	Hungarian minority interests	Béla Bugár	15 / 150	3 / 21
SOP	Social liberalism	Rudolf Schuster	13 / 150	3 / 21
Total			93 / 150	21

== Issues ==
=== Robert Fico and Formation of SMER-SD ===
In the 1998 elections that saw the fall of the government of Vladimír Mečiar, Fico received the biggest number of preferential votes among his party colleagues. A year later, when support for the SDĽ dropped below the threshold required to get into parliament, he left the party, saying he was disappointed with the way the government worked. As early as in the autumn of 1998, a four-person group consisting of Fico, his associate Frantisek Határ, political strategist Fedor Flašík, and media executive Monika Flašíková-Beňová had begun to discuss and lay plans for launching a new political party. These plans were driven by the falling popularity of the existing parties, and the rising popularity of Fico.

Almost immediately after leaving SDĽ, the group founded Direction (SMER), which Fico first labelled a party of the third way, with himself as leader. Fico established himself as an opposition politician criticizing the unpopular reforms of the right-wing government of Mikuláš Dzurinda. In order to keep SMER from repeating the fate of his previous party, Fico introduced a strict set of regulations for his new party, called the "clean hands" policy. The rules stipulated that no one with ties from the previous Communist regime or people who had background with other political parties was allowed to hold party office. This created a new generation of politicians uninvolved in previous corruption scandals; among them was Monika Flašíková-Beňová, Robert Kaliňák, and Pavol Paška. Another rule was that all party chapters on the regional and local levels were to be 100% financially self-sufficient, and all financial donations were to be made public to the media.

=== Bohunice Nuclear Power Plant and Bombing of Yugoslavia ===
On 14 September 1999, the government decided to gradually shut down the two units of the V1 nuclear power plant in Jaslovské Bohunice with an installed capacity of 880 MW before the end of their technical service life. It committed to closing the first unit by 31 December 2006 at the latest and the second unit by 31 December 2008. The shutdown of the units was one of the conditions for Slovakia's invitation to join the European Union. Although Slovakia was not a member of NATO in 1999, its agreement to use NATO airspace enabled the bombing of Yugoslavia.

=== Accident in Yugoslavia ===
A state Slovak delegation to Yugoslavia, which included Prime Minister Mikuláš Dzurinda and three senior cabinet members, have returned to Bratislava after an August 31 road accident involving their motorcade that left three dead and 11 injured. According to initial police reports, the crash was caused when a Serb motorist attempted a dangerous overtaking maneuver and hit three cars in the oncoming convoy.

=== "Vláčiky" scandal ===
The Vláčiky (Trains) scandal was the most significant corruption case of the first Dzurinda government (1998–2002), erupting in the months leading up to the 2002 parliamentary elections. The controversy centered on a tender for 35 light motor units for Slovak Railways (ŽSR) worth approximately 4.4 billion SKK.

==== Tender Discrepancy and Political Interference ====
The selection commission—chaired by Miroslav Dzurinda (the Prime Minister’s brother)—originally selected the Swiss company Stadler. However, the French competitor Alstom complained that its bid was not properly evaluated.

In early 2002, Transport Minister Jozef Macejko attempted to cancel the tender results due to dissatisfaction with the commission's choice, which triggered a massive political fallout.

=== The "Kresánek Letter" ===
The scandal became iconic due to a leaked letter from SDKÚ MP Peter Kresánek to Prime Minister Dzurinda. In the letter, Kresánek famously wrote that if the Prime Minister did not trust the minister’s leadership, it could hurt the SDKÚ party, implying that party interests were being prioritized over transparent public procurement.

==== Consequences ====
Prime Minister Dzurinda dismissed Minister Jozef Macejko in June 2002, citing a loss of trust and non-transparent behavior. Macejko and several high-ranking officials were charged with abuse of power and corruption in late 2002. In 2005, the prosecution dropped all charges against Macejko and others, stating that no crime had been proven.

The case remains a textbook example of political clientelism in post-communist Slovakia, highlighting the influence of "party treasurers" like Gabriel Palacka, who was often linked to such financial scandals

=== The "Black Books" Controversy ===
Early in 1999, the government published "Black Books" documenting the massive corruption and asset-stripping of the previous Mečiar government. However, the cabinet faced criticism when it struggled to secure convictions for these crimes, leading to public frustration over a perceived "lack of justice."

The "Black Books" remain a symbol of the unfulfilled expectations of the 1998 "democratic revolution," marking the moment public enthusiasm for political "cleansing" began to turn into skepticism.

=== The Gabriel Palacka Resignation ===
In August 1999, Minister of Transport and Telecommunications Gabriel Palacka (a close Dzurinda ally) offered his resignation following persistent allegations of corruption and clientelism within his ministry. Though he denied wrongdoing, his departure was seen as a move to protect the cabinet’s image during crucial EU accession talks.

==== Corruption allegations ====
Palacka faced intense scrutiny over several high-stakes deals within the Ministry of Transport and Telecommunications, including:

- The privatization of Slovak Telekom.
- The controversial auctioning of GSM 1800 mobile licenses.
- The operations and financial management of Slovak Airlines.

After resigning, Palacka remained an influential figure, eventually becoming the treasurer of Dzurinda's SDKÚ party. In this role, his name became synonymous with "grey eminence" politics and was later frequently cited in the Gorilla corruption file.

He was replaced by Jozef Macejko, who would later be dismissed himself in the 2002 Vláčiky scandal.
