= Krasna Ves =

Krasna Ves may refer to places:

- Krásná Ves, a municipality and village in the Czech Republic
- Krásna Ves, a municipality and village in Slovakia
