= Ľubomír Roman =

Slovak politician (1944–2022)

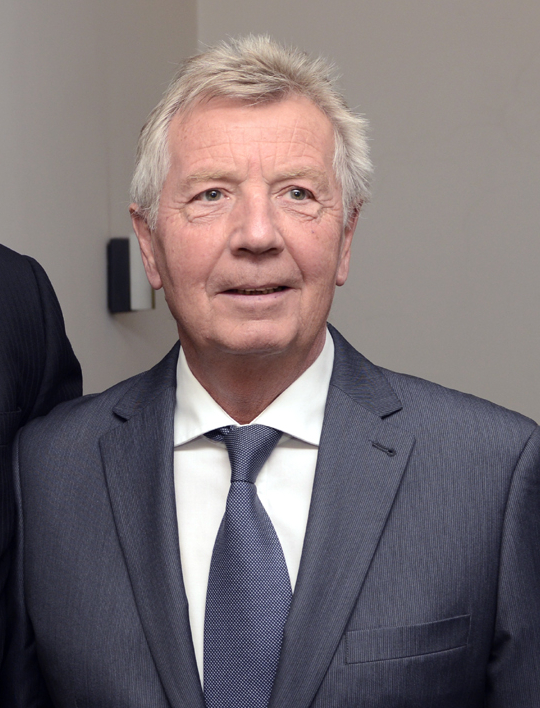
- Roman in 2015

Minister of Culture
- In office 15 March 1994 – 13 December 1994
- Preceded by: Dušan Slobodník
- Succeeded by: Ivan Hudec

Member of the National Council of Slovakia
- In office 1994–1998

Personal details
- Born: 12 April 1944 Malacky, Slovakia
- Died: 13 March 2022 (aged 77) Bratislava, Slovakia
- Party: KDH
- Education: Academy of Performing Arts in Bratislava

Ľubomír Roman (12 April 1944 – 13 March 2022) was a Slovak politician. A member of the Christian Democratic Movement, he served as Minister of Culture from March to December 1994 and was a member of the National Council from 1994 to 1998. He died of a heart attack in Bratislava on 13 March 2022, at the age of 77.
