= Chief of the General Staff (Slovakia) =

Head of the Slovak military

- Náčelník Generálneho štábu (Slovak)
- Seal of the General Staff
- Incumbent; Lieutenant General Miroslav Lorinc since 7 May 2026
- Ministry of Defence of Slovakia
- Reports to: The president Minister of Defence
- Seat: Bratislava, Slovakia
- Appointer: The president
- Precursor: Chief of the General Staff (Czechoslovakia)
- Formation: 1 September 1994
- First holder: Colonel General Jozef Tuchyňa

The chief of the general staff (Slovak: Náčelník Generálneho štábu) is the chief of the general staff of the Slovak Armed Forces, the military of the Slovak Republic. He is appointed by the president of Slovakia, who is the commander-in-chief. The current chief of the general staff is Lieutenant General Daniel Zmeko.

The post was created as part of the separation of the Slovak armed forces from those of the Czech and Slovak Federative Republic (CSFR). In June 1994 the commander of the Slovak Army, Julius Humaj, announced the transformation of the Army High Command (formerly Command East of the CSFR) into a general staff along Western lines. This was approved by the Slovak National Council on 26 August, with laws establishing that the chief of the general staff would be subordinate to the civilian defence minister.

== List of chiefs of the general staff ==
For period from 1919 to 1992, see Chief of the General Staff of Czechoslovakia.

No.	Portrait	Name (Birth–Death)	Term of office			Defence branch	Ref.
No.	Portrait	Name (Birth–Death)	Took office	Left office	Time in office	Defence branch	Ref.
–		Lieutenant General; Július Humaj (born 1949) (Note: Commander of the Army of the Slovak Republic HQ.)	1 January 1993	18 March 1993	76 days	Army	
1		Lieutenant General; Július Humaj (born 1949)	18 March 1993	31 August 1994	1 year, 166 days	Army	
2		Colonel General; Jozef Tuchyňa (1941–2019)	1 September 1994	19 August 1998	3 years, 352 days	Army	
3		Major General; Marián Mikluš (born 1953) (Note: Dismissed by the Minister of Defence Pavol Kanis.)	19 August 1998	4 December 1998	107 days	Army	
4		General; Milan Cerovský (born 1949)	4 December 1998	21 December 2004	6 years, 17 days	Army	
5		General; Ľubomír Bulík (born 1957)	21 December 2004	15 December 2011	6 years, 359 days	Army	
6		Lieutenant General; Peter Vojtek (born 1958)	15 December 2011	6 May 2014	2 years, 142 days	Air Force	
7		General; Milan Maxim (born 1956)	6 May 2014	7 May 2018	4 years, 1 day	Army	
8		General; Daniel Zmeko (born 1967)	7 May 2018	7 May 2026	8 years, 0 days	Army	
9		Lieutenant General; Miroslav Lorinc (born 1963)	7 May 2026	Incumbent	167 days	Air Force	

== See also ==
- Slovak Armed Forces
