= Oľga Feldeková =

Slovak writer (1943–2025)

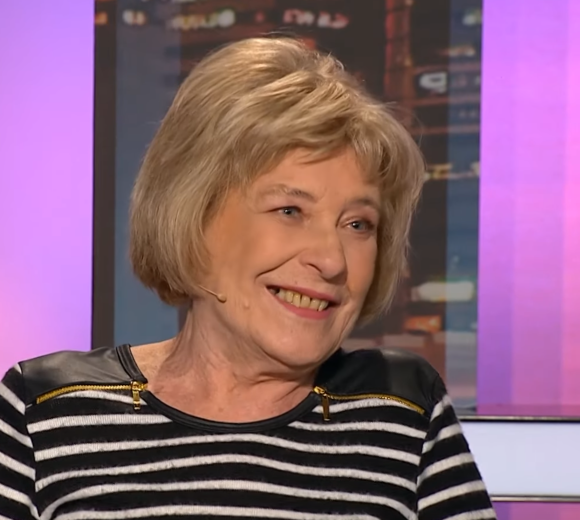
- Feldeková in 2024
- Born: Oľga Lukáčiová; 28 March 1943; Martin, Slovakia
- Died: 6 December 2025 (aged 82); Bratislava, Slovakia
- Education: Comenius University
- Occupations: Writer, essayist, satirist
- Spouse: Ľubomír Feldek
- Children: 5
- Writing career
- Language: Slovak

Oľga Feldeková (née Lukáčiová, 28 March 1943 – 6 December 2025) was a Slovak writer and satirist. Her early works were targeted towards children and young adults, but her later works were intended primarily for adults.

== Early life and career ==
Oľga Feldeková was born on 28 March 1943 in Martin, and grew up in Tvrdošín. After graduating from high school, she was unable to continue her education due to restrictions placed on her by the Czechoslovak Socialist Republic. Instead, she worked as a manual laborer in the Tesla electronics factory in Nižná, close to Tvrdošín, where she met her fellow writer and future husband Ľubomír Feldek.

After two years of manual work, she was able to commence her studies of journalism at the Comenius University. From 1977 to 1983, she worked for the youth edition of the Nové Slovo magazine, later as a screenwriter for Slovak film studios.

Starting in 2001, Feldeková was a regular cast member of the satirical TV show Sedem, which aired on Markíza and later on TV JOJ.

== Writing ==
Feldeková's early works were intended for children and young adults. At first, she published in literary journals; her first book was Dnes vám hráme v zlatom ráme (1974) co-authored with her husband. In 1975, she published her single-author debut, Rozprávky pre dievčatko. Her later works Sťahovanie na mieste (1976), Dievča a šťastie (1979) a Veverica (1985) were intended for adult readers. Her book Kým som šťastný (2013) represents the culmination of her embrace of magical realism evident already in Veverica.

According to the literary critic Viktor Kochol, Feldeková's writing combines a fresh outlook and social critique in a way unseen in Slovak women's literature since Timrava.

== Personal life and death ==
Feldeková met her husband, the poet Ľubomír Feldek, when she was 17 years old. They had five children together. They resided in Bratislava. Following the Dissolution of Czechoslovakia, they moved to a self-imposed exile in Prague for several years to escape violent threats by nationalists due to a poem by her husband criticizing the minister of culture Dušan Slobodník.

Feldeková died in Bratislava on 6 December 2025, at the age of 82.
