= Ernest Valko =

Slovak judge (1953–2010)

JUDr. Ernest Valko PhD.
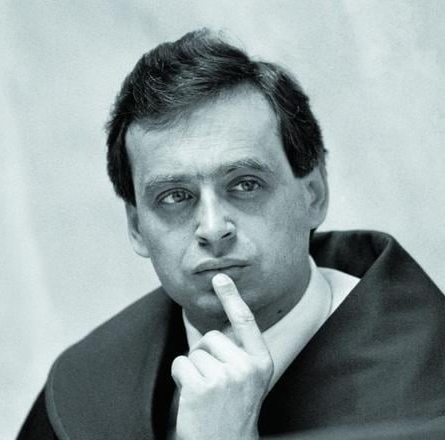

Personal details
- Born: August 10, 1953 Spišská Nová Ves, Czechoslovakia
- Died: November 8, 2010 (aged 57) Limbach, Slovakia
- Education: Comenius University
- Occupation: Lawyer, judge

Ernest Valko, JUDr., PhD. (10 August 1953 – 8 November 2010) was the former chairman of the Czechoslovak Constitutional Court and prominent Slovak lawyer. Valko was shot dead inside his home in Limbach in 2010. As of May 2011, the investigation is still ongoing. According to newspaper Nový Čas, one of the versions points to an organized crime group from Bratislava.

Ernest Valko was connected to numerous high-profile lawsuits at the time of his death.

== Education ==
Ernest Valko was born in Spišská Nová Ves, at that time Czechoslovakia. He received his M.A. at the Faculty of Law, Comenius University in Bratislava (1973–1977). In 1979 he received his rigorosum at the same school. From 2000 to 2004 he studied postgradually at the Institute of State and Law of the Slovak Academy of Sciences, earning his dissertation in 2004.

== Political career ==
After the Velvet Revolution, he was co-opted by Verejnosť proti násiliu (the Slovak counterpart of the better known Civic Forum) as a member of parliament into the Federálne zhromaždenie (English: Federal assembly) in 1990. During his time in the parliament, Valko helped formulate the novelisations of the Labour Law, Trade Law, Competence Law, implementing the Charter of fundamental rights and freedoms and the constitutional Law of Referendum. He served as the deputy speaker of the Lower House of the Czechoslovak federal parliament (Czech: Sněmovna lidu) in the period 1990–1991. From 31 January 1992 to 31 December 1992 he was the chairman of the Constitutional Court of Czechoslovakia, the only one in its history.

After the creation of Slovakia in 1993 he established his own law firm and specialised in constitutional law. In 2006 he unsuccessfully run for the Slovak parliament.

== Work ==
Ernest Valko was connected to many important lawsuits in the past, including:

- Ľubomír Feldek vs. Slovak Ministry of Culture
- SPP (Slovak Gas Industry) vs. Union banka (Union Bank), part of the so-called Duckého zmenky

According to newspaper Pravda, Valko's murder may be connected to the 1999 shooting of former minister in three Slovak governments and privatisation oligarch Ján Ducký. Ducký, as the former director of SPP (Slovak Gas Industry – one of the most prosperous companies in Slovakia at that time) is the author of the so-called Duckého zmenky. Ernest Valko was SPP's attorney since 2000. There are similarities between the shootings of Ducký and Valko.

Recently Valko represented Finance Minister Ivan Mikloš in a libel lawsuit filed against former prime minister of Slovakia Robert Fico, the leader of the opposition Smer party, in which Mikloš was successful. Valko also was recently representing the state-owned lottery company, Tipos, in a suit in which there is the possibility that the state might lose 66 million euro.

There have been allegations that Valko was murdered because of the Tipos vs. Lemikon Limited case.

=== Other positions ===
- 1997–death – arbiter at the Arbitration Court of the Chamber of Commerce and Industry of the Slovak Republic
- 1998–death – trustee in bankruptcy proceedings, restructuring proceedings or proceedings on settlement of debts
- 1999–2002 – member of the supervisory board of Istrobanka, a.s.
- 1999–2002 – member of the supervisory board of Slovenská poisťovňa, a.s. (Slovak Insurance Company, a.s.)
- 1999–2004 – member of the Slovak Board for Radio and Television Broadcasting and Retransmission
- 2000–2001 – member of APS Consortium led by European Law & Policy Advisory Group, GbR (ELPA Group), that within the PHARE project rendered legal advice with a view to harmonise the Slovak legislation, aimed at short-term and middle-term priorities of partnership for the accession to the European Union
- 2003–death – member of the supervisory board of Slovenské elektrárne, a.s. (Slovak power plant a.s.)

== Death ==
Ernest Valko was found dead by his daughter and ex-wife in his home in Limbach on 8 November 2010. His death is under investiagion by Úrad boja proti organizovanej kriminalite.

According to newspaper SME, there are four possible motives for Valko's murder:

- Robbery – although this seems unlikely to some, the police were not able to rule out the possibility that Valko's death was unrelated to his work. The fact is, that Valko's house was broken into in the past and the lawyer reported his two legally held firearms as missing. Ministry of Interior of Slovakia publicly denied the information that Valko received a safety shot to the head, implicating targeted killing.
- Duckého zmenky
- Tipos vs. Lemikon Limited lawsuit
- Rašelina Quido case – a lawsuit about a lucrative peat bog in Slovakia connected to the company Peat Group, formerly Rašelina Quido. Ernest Valko was the attorney of businessman Tobiáš Loyka against two former Slovak Information Service agents Michal Hrbáček and Martin Lieskovský.

As of May 2011, the consensus among Slovak pundits and journalists is that Ernest Valko's death was a targeted killing carried out by one of the organized groups of Slovakia's underground. The hit was probably ordered from the outside of the mafia and possibly carried out by a hitman from outside of Slovakia.

== See also ==
- Crime in Slovakia
