= Jan Stráský's Cabinet =

Last government of Czechoslovakia

Jan Stráský's Cabinet was in power from 2 July 1992 to 31 December 1992. It was the last government of Czechoslovakia. It consisted of Civic Democratic Party, Movement for a Democratic Slovakia and Christian and Democratic Union – Czechoslovak People's Party. Leader of Civic Democratic Party Václav Klaus was originally authorised by President to form government. He instead decided to form Government of the Czech Republic.

== Government ministers ==
Portfolio	Name	Political party
Prime Minister, Minister of Labour and Social Affairs	Jan Stráský	Civic Democratic Party
Deputy Prime Minister, Minister of State Control	Rudolf Filkus	Movement for a Democratic Slovakia
Deputy Prime Minister	Milan Čič	Movement for a Democratic Slovakia
Deputy Prime Minister	Miroslav Macek	Civic Democratic Party
Deputy Prime Minister, Minister of Transportation	Antonín Baudyš	Christian and Democratic Union – Czechoslovak People's Party
Minister of Interior	Petr Čermák	Civic Democratic Party
Minister of Finances	Jan Klak	Civic Democratic Party
Minister of Economic Policy and Development	Jaroslav Kubečka	Movement for a Democratic Slovakia
Minister of Foreign Affairs	Petr Moravčík	Movement for a Democratic Slovakia
Minister of Defence	Imrich Andrejčák	Movement for a Democratic Slovakia
