= Imrich Andrejčák =

Slovak army general and politician (1941–2018)

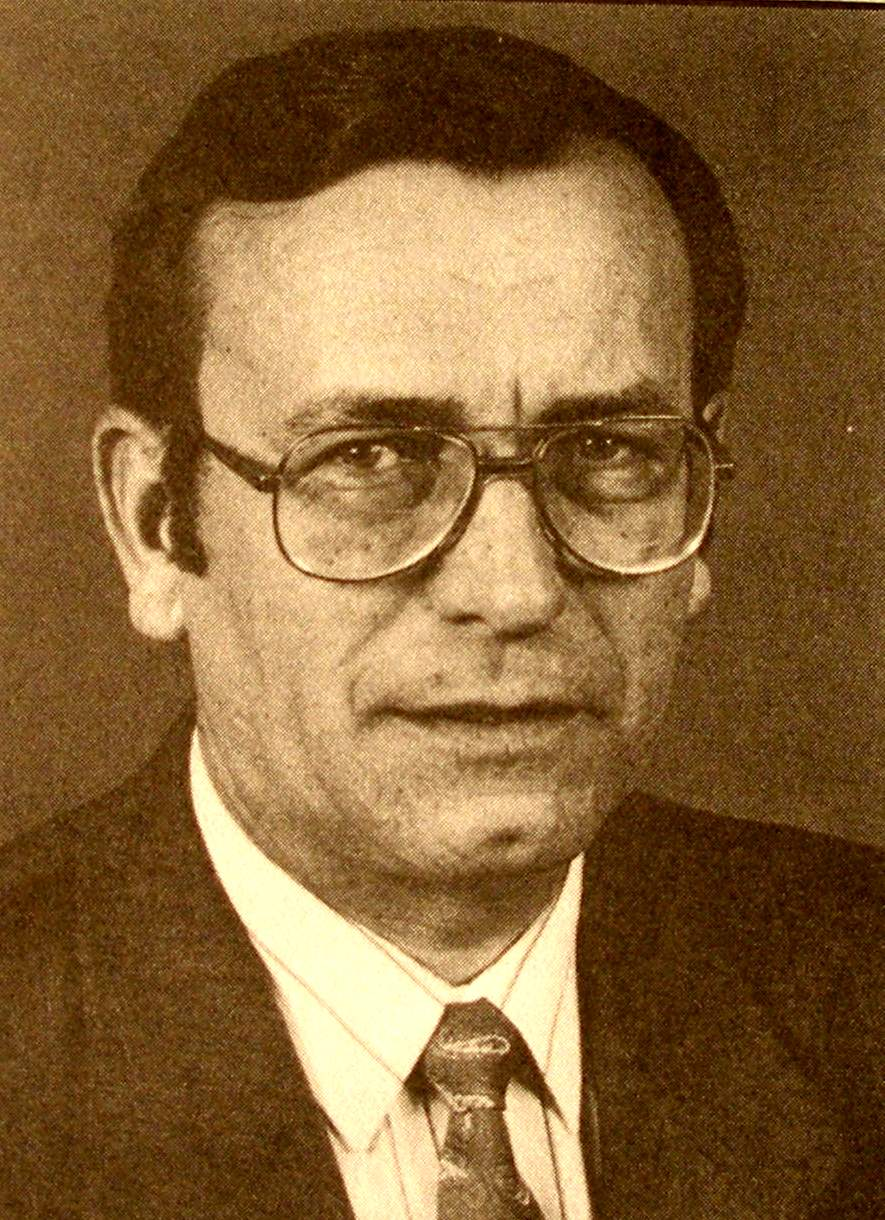

Minister of Defence of Slovakia
- In office 16 March 1993 – 15 March 1994
- Prime Minister: Vladimír Mečiar
- Preceded by: Office created
- Succeeded by: Pavol Kanis

Minister of Defence of Czechoslovakia
- In office 2 July 1992 – 31 December 1992
- Prime Minister: Jan Stráský
- Preceded by: Luboš Dobrovský
- Succeeded by: Office abolished

Personal details
- Born: 12 July 1941 Enyicke, Hungary (now: Haniska, Slovakia)
- Died: 5 September 2018 (aged 77) Trenčín, Slovakia
- Party: Communist Party of Czechoslovakia, People's Party – Movement for a Democratic Slovakia

Imrich Andrejčák (12 July 1941 – 5 September 2018) was a Czechoslovak-born Slovak army general and politician. He was the last Minister of Defence of Czechoslovakia from 2 July 1992 until 31 December 1992, with the dissolution of the country. Andrejčák then became the first Defence Minister of an independent Slovakia from 16 March 1993 and 14 March 1994.

== Biography ==
Andrejčák was born on 12 July 1941 in the Slovak village of Haniska, Košice-okolie District, Czechoslovakia. He studied at the Jan Žižka Military School in Bratislava from 1955 until 1958 and the Military School in Vyškov from 1958 to 1961. In 1961, he was commissioned as a Czechoslovak Army officer with the rank of Lieutenant. He served as a commander from 1961 to 1968. He then studied intelligence at the Military Academy in Brno in 1971.

Andrejčák was a member of the Communist Party of Czechoslovakia from 1960 until the Velvet Revolution in 1989. Towards the end of the Communist era, Andrejčák held the positions of Commander of the 1st Army of the Central Military District from 1982 to 1987, Chief of Staff of the Eastern Military Circuit in Trenčín from 1988 until 1989, and Commander of the Eastern Military District in Trenčín from 11 September 1989 to 2 November 1990.

Following the fall of communism, Andrejčák, who joined the early ĽS-HZDS, was appointed Deputy Minister of Defence of the Czech and Slovak Federative Republic (ČSFR) from 2 November 1990 until 25 June 1990. He also headed the Czechoslovak federal Minister of Defence's office strategic and conceptual security issues during this time.

Andrejčák served as the last Minister of Defence of Czechoslovakia (ČSFR) from 2 July 1992 until 31 December 1992, within the Cabinet of Prime Minister Jan Stráský. The country split into independence Slovakia and the Czech Republic on 1 January 1993.

Following the independence of Slovakia, Andrejčák was appointed the country's first Minister of Defence from 16 March 1993 until 15 March 1994.

Andrejčák died in Trenčín, Slovakia, on 5 September 2018, at the age of 77. His death was confirmed by his daughter, Blanka Fetkovicova Andrejcakova. Slovak Defence Minister Peter Gajdoš and the Chief of Slovak Armed Forces, General Daniel Zmeko, ordered that defence ministry flags be flown at half staff in Andrejčák's honor.

== Awards ==
- Milan Rastislav Stefanik Order, 2nd Class
- In 1998, Andrejčák was awarded the Order of Ľudovít Štúr by Slovak President Michal Kováč.
