= Marián Čalfa's Second Cabinet =

The second cabinet of Prime Minister Marián Čalfa was in power from 27 June 1990 to 2 July 1992. It originally consisted of Civic Forum (OF), Public Against Violence (VPN), Christian Democratic Movement (KDH) and Communist Party of Czechoslovakia (KSČ). Prime minister was member of VPN. KSČ left government in October 1990. When OF was dissolved in 1991, it was replaced by Civic Movement (OH) and Civic Democratic Party (ODS). It was known as "Cabinet of National Sacrifice."

== Government ministers ==
Portfolio	Name	Political party
Prime Minister	Marián Čalfa	VPN
Deputy Prime Minister	Jiří Dienstbier	OF
Deputy Prime Minister	Jiří Dienstbier	OH
Deputy Prime Minister	Jozef Mikloško	KDH
Deputy Prime Minister	Pavel Rychetský	OF
Deputy Prime Minister	Pavel Rychetský	OH
Deputy Prime Minister	Václav Valeš	non-partisan
Deputy Prime Minister	Václav Klaus (since October 1991)	ODS
Deputy Prime Minister	Pavel Hoffmann (since October 1991)	VPN
Minister of Foreign Affairs	Jiří Dienstbier	OF
Minister of Foreign Affairs	Jiří Dienstbier	OH
Minister of Defense	Miroslav Vacek (until 18 October 1990)	KSČ
Minister of Defense	Luboš Dobrovský (since 18 October 1990)	OF
Minister of Defense	Luboš Dobrovský (since 18 October 1990)	OH
Minister of Interior	Ján Langoš	VPN
Minister of Transportation	Jiří Nezval	non-partisan
Minister of Finances	Václav Klaus (since October 1991)	OF
Minister of Finances	Václav Klaus (since October 1991)	ODS
Minister of Labour and Social Affairs	Jiří Dienstbier	OF
Minister of Labour and Social Affairs	Jiří Dienstbier	OH
Minister of Trade	Slavomír Stračár (until 21 August 1991)	VPN
Minister of Trade	Jozef Bakšay (since 21 August 1991)	VPN
Minister of Communications	Theodor Petrík (until 19 April 1991)	non-partisan
Minister of Communications	Emil Ehrenberger (since 19 April 1991)	KDH
Minister of Economy	Vladimír Dlouhý	OF
Minister of Economy	Vladimír Dlouhý	ODA
Minister of Strategic Planning	Pavel Hoffmann (since October 1991)	VPN
Minister of State Control	Květoslava Kořínková	OF
Minister of State Control	Květoslava Kořínková	OH
Minister of Competition	Imrich Flassik	KDH
Minister of Environment	Josef Vavroušek	OF
Minister of Environment	Josef Vavroušek	OH
