= Horné Plachtince =

Horné Plachtince Felsőpalojta
- Municipality
- Flag

- Location of Horné Plachtince in the Banská Bystrica Region Location of Horné Plachtince in Slovakia
- Coordinates: 48.23°N 19.28°E
- Country: Slovakia
- Region: Banská Bystrica Region
- District: Veľký Krtíš District
- First mentioned: 1244

Area
  - Total: 10.53 km^{2} (4.07 sq mi)
- Elevation: 243 m (797 ft)

Population (2025)
  - Total: 216
- Time zone: UTC+1 (CET)
  - Summer (DST): UTC+2 (CEST)
- Postal code: 991 24
- Area code: +421 47
- Vehicle registration plate (until 2022): VK
- Website: www.horne-plachtince.eu

Horné Plachtince (Hungarian: Felsőpalojta) is a village and municipality in the Veľký Krtíš District of the Banská Bystrica Region of southern Slovakia.

== Geography ==
The municipality lies at an altitude of 243 metres (797 ft) and covers an area of 10.53 km^{2} (4.07 sq mi) (2025).

== History ==
In historical records, the village was first mentioned in 1243 (1243 Palahta, Palojtha, 1245 Palahta, Plahta, 1337 Palahta Superior). It belonged to nobles Doboy, Daszcoy and Simonfy. In 1685 it was pillaged by Turks. In 1776 it passed to ecclesiastical Rožňava’s Capitol.

== Population ==
Population statistic (10 years)
Year	1995	2005	2015	2025
Count	216	194	206	216
Difference		−10.18%	+6.18%	+4.85%

Population statistic
Year	2024	2025
Count	209	216
Difference		+3.34%

It has a population of 216 people (31 December 2025).

=== Ethnicity ===
Census 2021 (1+ %)
Ethnicity	Number	Fraction
Slovak	200	95.23%
Not found out	7	3.33%
Hungarian	3	1.42%
Total	210	

In year 2021 was 210 people by ethnicity 200 as Slovak, 7 as Not found out, 3 as Hungarian, 1 as Czech and 1 as Polish.

Note on population: The difference values of population numbers in the table "Population statistic" and in the sections "Ethnicity" & "Religion" is caused by the use of various statistical methods.

=== Religion ===
Census 2021 (1+ %)
Religion	Number	Fraction
Evangelical Church	116	55.24%
Roman Catholic Church	58	27.62%
None	31	14.76%
Not found out	5	2.38%
Total	210	

In year 2021 was 210 people by religion 116 from Evangelical Church, 58 from Roman Catholic Church, 31 from None and 5 from Not found out.

== Famous people ==
- Milan Kňažko, actor and politician

== Genealogical resources ==
The records for genealogical research are available at the state archive "Statny Archiv in Banska Bystrica, Slovakia"

- Roman Catholic church records (births/marriages/deaths): 1689-1900 (parish B)
- Lutheran church records (births/marriages/deaths): 1731-1939 (parish B)

== See also ==
- List of municipalities and towns in Slovakia
