= Marián Čalfa =

Former Czechoslovak and Slovak politician, Prime Minister of Czechoslovakia (1989-1992)

Prime Minister of Czechoslovakia
- In office 10 December 1989 – 2 July 1992
- President: Václav Havel
- Preceded by: Ladislav Adamec
- Succeeded by: Jan Stráský

Personal details
- Born: 7 May 1946 (age 79) Trebišov, Czechoslovakia
- Party: Communist Party of Czechoslovakia (c. 1968–1990); Public Against Violence (1990–1991); Civic Democratic Union (Slovakia) (1991–1992)

Marián Čalfa (born 7 May 1946, in Trebišov) is a Slovak former politician, who served as prime minister of Czechoslovakia during and after the Velvet Revolution in 1989, as well as de facto acting President for 19 days. He was a key figure in the smooth transfer of power from Communist rule to democracy.

== Career ==
From 1985, Čalfa worked as the head of a legislative department of the Czechoslovak federal government. In April 1988, he became the chairman of the legislative committee. On 10 December 1989, during the Velvet Revolution, he was appointed prime minister in place of discredited Ladislav Adamec. Although Čalfa was a member of the Communist Party of Czechoslovakia (KSČ), this government had a non-Communist majority. He thus headed the first cabinet in 41 years that was not dominated by the KSČ. When President Gustáv Husák resigned shortly after swearing in the government, Čalfa also took on most presidential duties until the election of Václav Havel on 29 December.

On 18 January 1990, Čalfa left the KSČ to join Public Against Violence (VPN), the Slovak counterpart of Havel's Civic Forum, thus becoming the first prime minister since before World War II who was not a Communist or a fellow traveler. The first postwar prime minister, Social Democrat Zdeněk Fierlinger, had been openly pro-Communist, and later led his party into a merger with the Communists. Čalfa helped lead Havel's movement to a sweeping victory in the 1990 elections. When VPN dissolved in April 1991, he followed most of the party into the Civic Democratic Union (ODU-VPN), of which he became a leading member.

Both cabinets headed by Čalfa succeeded in introducing significant political and economic reforms, facilitating the transition from Communist rule to a multi-party system and a market-oriented economy. Čalfa received strong support from other political figures, including both President Václav Havel and Finance Minister Václav Klaus.

Čalfa resigned from the Federal Government after the defeat of the Public Against Violence in the elections of 1992. He was succeeded by caretaker Jan Stráský, whose major task was to oversee the Dissolution of Czechoslovakia. In that year, Čalfa took up Czech citizenship and started working as a lawyer in Prague, heading the law firm Čalfa, Bartošík a Partneři.

During his tenure as prime minister, Čalfa was occasionally a target of criticism for his Communist past. Some cited this as proof that the Velvet Revolution was unfinished or had even been "stolen" by people belonging to the past nomenklatura. Presently, historians consider him a "power behind the throne," who greatly contributed to the smoothness and speed of the Velvet Revolution and the election of Václav Havel as president. He used his negotiation skills in critical moments against his fellow Communist Party members and talked them into compromises that were sometimes more radical than the representatives of the Civic Forum had expected.

== See also ==
- First Čalfa Cabinet
- Marián Čalfa's Second Cabinet

Political offices
Preceded by Ladislav Adamec	Prime Minister of Czechoslovakia; 1989–1992	Succeeded by Jan Stráský
Preceded by Gustáv Husák	President of Czechoslovakia (acting); 1989	Succeeded by Václav Havel
