= Ľubomír Feldek =

Slovak poet, writer, and playwright (born 1936)

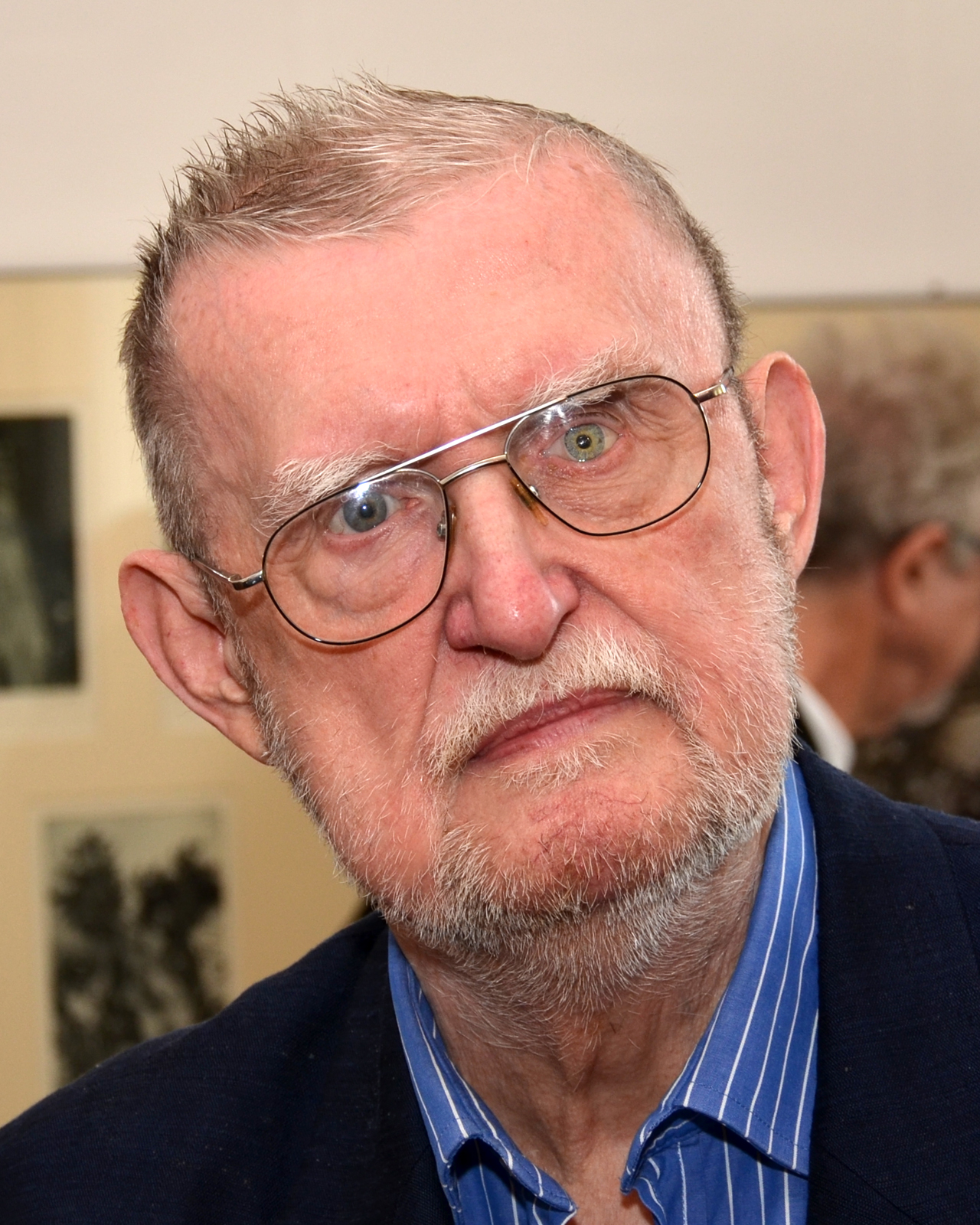
- Born: 9 October 1936; Žilina, Czechoslovakia
- Occupations: poet; writer; playwright; translator
- Spouse: Oľga Feldeková

Ľubomír Feldek (born 9 October 1936, Žilina, Czechoslovakia) is a Slovak poet, writer, playwright, and translator. He was married to writer Oľga Feldeková (1943–2025).

Feldek is the author of several books of poetry (Kriedový kruh, Paracelsus, and Milovanie pred usnutím), the novel Van Stiphout, and several plays including Teta na zjedenie or Jánošík podľa Vivaldiho. He translates works of modern world poets (Alexander Blok, Vladimir Mayakovsky, or Guillaume Apollinaire) as well as classical plays (such as those by Sophocles and William Shakespeare). He has also written a couple of books for children, most notably the Modrá kniha rozprávok and Zelená kniha rozprávok illustrated by Albín Brunovský. According to the Index Translationum statistics, he is among the top ten most translated authors writing in Slovak.

== Biography ==
Ľubomír Feldek was born 9 October 1936 in Žilina, Czechoslovakia. He studied Slovak language at the University of Pedagogy in Bratislava. While still studying, he began working as an editor at the Mladé Letá publishing house and contributed to Mladá tvorba. He was dismissed for political reasons before completing his studies and subsequently worked as a printing machine operator. He later became an editor of a magazine published by the Tesla television factory in the Nižná Orava region. From 1961 to 1973, he worked independently as a writer and publisher. In 1973, he returned to editorial work, joining the Slovenský spisovateľ publishing house, where he was responsible for domestic and foreign literature. Between 1976 and 1979, he was a dramaturg with the Poetic Ensemble of the Nová scéna Theatre in Bratislava. From 1986, he again worked as a freelance artist.

In January 1989, he protested against the arrest of Václav Havel and signed a political manifesto A Couple of Sentences. During the Velvet Revolution he closely cooperated with the movement Public Against Violence, which transformed itself into a political party later on.

== Feldek vs. Slobodník and Feldek vs. Slovakia ==
In 1992, Feldek publicly noted that "Dušan Slobodník became Minister of Culture and his fascist past immediately came to light", referencing to his involvement in an SS training course as a teenager (at the age of 17) in Sekule at the time of the First Slovak Republic. The statement was published shortly after the appointment of a new Government, following the 1992 parliamentary elections, in which Slobodník became a minister. Feldek has also written the poem Dobrú noc, má milá, containing the verse "esesák sa objal s eštébákom" (an SS man gave a hug to an STB agent), referencing to the disputed past of both Dušan Slobodník and Prime Minister Vladimír Mečiar. Slobodník sued him for defamation, and after losing at the Municipal Court in Bratislava, a senate consisting of three Supreme Court members voted in his favor. Feldek was obliged to apologize and pay 250,000 SKK. Although the senate of appeal of the Supreme Court abolished the financial penalty, Feldek's defendant Ernest Valko brought the case to the European Court of Human Rights in Strasbourg. In 2001, in the Feldek vs. Slovakia case, the court ruled that freedom of speech was breached. Feldek was awarded damages amounting to 500,000 SKK.

Feldek and his family moved to Prague in 1995, but he himself moved back to Bratislava several years later.
