= Devět kruhů pekla =

1989 film

- Directed by: Milan Muchna
- Written by: Milan Muchna; Alexander Cukes
- Produced by: Jan Syrový
- Starring: Milan Kňažko
- Cinematography: Petr Hojda
- Edited by: Dalibor Lipský
- Distributed by: Kampuchea, Ministry of Culture, Dept. of Film; Filmové Studio Barrandov
- Release date: April 1988
- Running time: 96 minutes
- Country: Czechoslovakia
- Language: Czech

Devět kruhů pekla (English: Nine Circles of Hell) is a 1988 Czechoslovak drama film directed by Milan Muchna. It was screened in the Un Certain Regard section at the 1989 Cannes Film Festival. The film describes the Khmer Rouge period in Cambodia. Tomáš is a Czech doctor working in Phnom Penh and Khema is famous Khmer actress.

== Plot ==
Nine Circles of Hell is a tragic love story of a Czech doctor and a Cambodian woman who marry and have a child but are then separated by the Khmer Rouge regime. The young mother dies from their atrocities and the Czech doctor is sent back to Czechoslovakia. When the Khmer Rouge are driven from power, the doctor returns and is reunited with his child.

== Analysis ==
Nine Circles of Hell is a rare witness on tape of the state of Phnom Penh in the aftermath of the Khmer Civil War. As a Czech-Cambodian romantic drama production supported by both the Department of Film of the Ministry of Culture of Kampuchea and the Czech Nine Circles of Hell, it belongs among those eighties co-productions that stemmed from cultural activities agreed with “friendly [communist] regimes” of the time.

One of the expert consultants, Ruy Neakong, is one of only fourteen survivors from the twenty thousand prisoners of the Tuol Sleng prison which operated in Phnom Penh between 1975 and 1979. Another expert consultant, Chheng Phon laeter became the director of the Cambodian National Conservatoire and later the Cambodian minister of culture – as he helped to educate younger representatives in the national cultural traditions because he was one of only a few students and ten teachers who had survived the Khmer genocide.

== Cast ==
- Milan Kňažko as Tomáš
  - Petr Čepek as Tomáš (voice)
- Oum Savanny as Khema
- Heng Chanrith as Dr. Rath Thong
- Ban Thavy as Thyda
- Nov Chandary as Chivan
- Khuon Chhum as Pon
- Jiří Samek as doc. Samek
- Jiří Schmitzer as Dalibor
- Jan Schmid as dr. Kubeš
- Milan Lasica as dr. Kalivoda

== See also ==
- The Killing Fields, a 1984 British film
- Shadow of Darkness, a 1989 Cambodian film
