= Miroslav Lorinc =

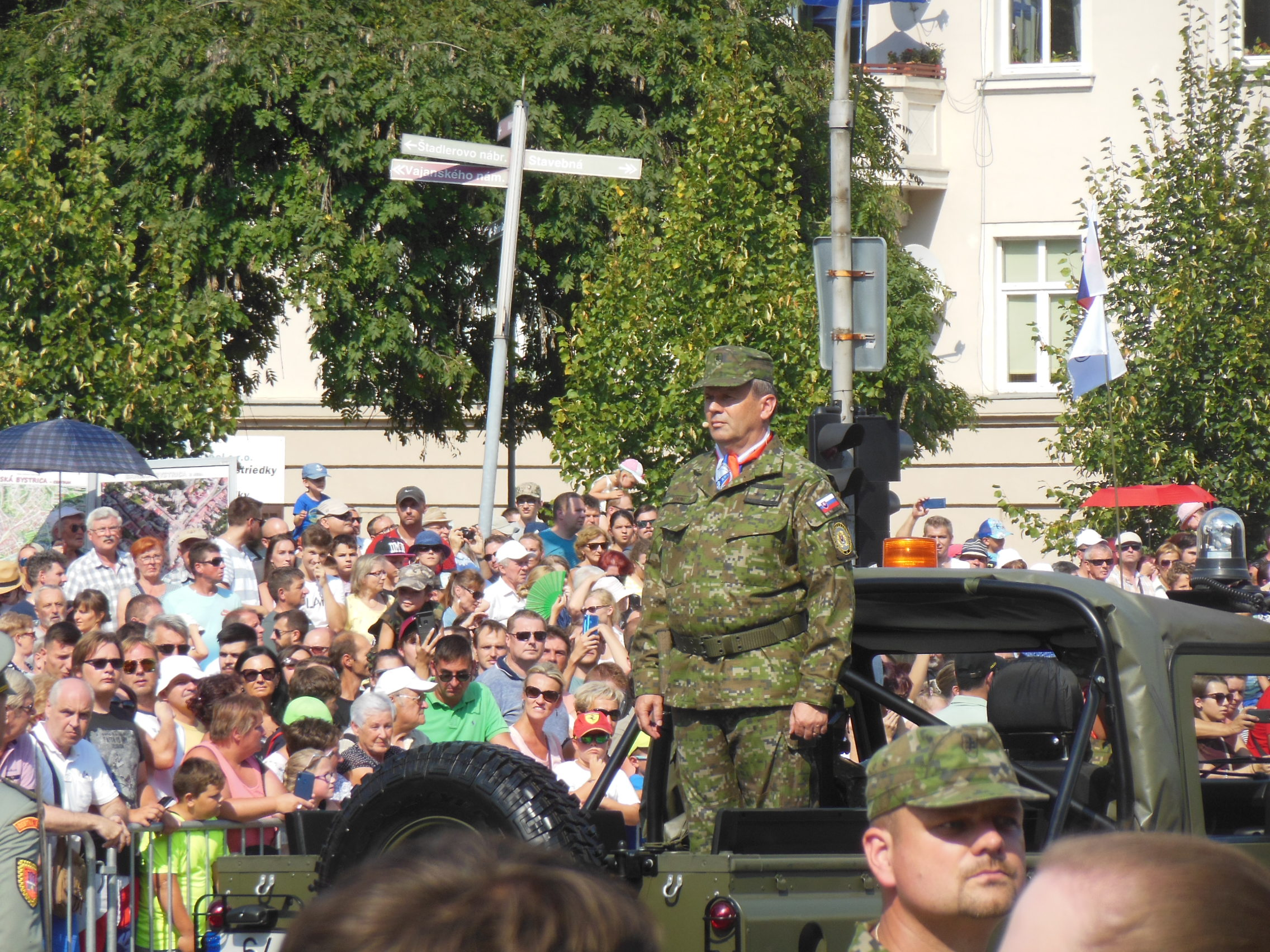
Lorinc at the parade in honor of the 75th anniversary of the Slovak National Uprising in Banská Bystrica.

General Miroslav Lorinc (born 4 February 1963) is a Slovak general. He has been the Chief of the General Staff of the Slovak Armed Forces since April 2026.

== Biography ==
Lorinc graduated from the Secondary Industrial School of Construction in Rožňava in 1982 and from the Military Technical School in Liptovský Mikuláš in 1986. He began his military career in 1986 as the commander of the control measuring station, 71st Anti-Aircraft Missile Brigade of the Czechoslovak People's Army in Chyňava. He worked in this unit in various positions until 1993. That year he became the chief of the S-300 technical laboratory in the 185th Anti-Aircraft Missile Brigade in Liptovský Hrádek. In 1994 he became the deputy commander of the plrsk S-300 PMU, 36th anti-aircraft missile brigade in Nitra, and was briefly its intelligence chief. From 1996 to 2003, he was the commander of the S-300 PMU anti-aircraft missile group in this brigade, from 2003 to 2004, its chief of staff, and from 2004 to 2005, its deputy commander. In 2006, he began working at the Air Force Headquarters in Zvolen as the deputy chief of the department for planning and operation management. In 2010, he became the deputy chief of the department for training, exercises, and doctrines of the General Staff of the Slovak Armed Forces. From 2013 to 2016, he commanded the 11th Air Force Brigade of the Slovak Air Force in Nitra.

In 2016, he became the Deputy Commander of the Air Force. On 15 October 2018, he was appointed to the position of Deputy Chief of the General Staff, replacing Miroslav Kocian. He graduated from the National Security Course in 2006. He was promoted to the first general rank, Brigadier General, as Deputy Commander of the Air Force on 22 August 2016 by the government and appointed by President Andrej Kisko on 8 September 2016. He became the 18th general appointed in the Armed Forces. On 28 May 2019, President Andrej Kiska promoted him to the rank of major general. On 28 November 2024, he was made the Deputy Chief of the General Staff. On 26 September 2025, President Peter Pellegrini promoted him to the rank of lieutenant general.

== Chief of the General Staff ==
On 22 April 2026, Lorinc was presented by the Minister of Defence Robert Kaliňák as a candidate for Chief of the General Staff. Lorinc's nomination was approved by the Fico Cabinet that day. On 30 April 2026, President Peter Pellegrini appointed him to the position. On 3 June 2026, President Pellegrini promoted him to the rank of general.
