= Ivan Hudec =

Slovak writer and politician (1947–2022)

Minister of Culture
- In office 13 December 1994 – 29 October 1998
- Preceded by: Ľubomír Roman
- Succeeded by: Milan Kňažko

Personal details
- Born: 10 July 1947 Nitra, Czechoslovakia
- Died: 7 February 2022 (aged 74) Bratislava, Slovakia
- Party: SDL'; HZDS
- Education: Comenius University

Ivan Hudec (10 July 1947 – 7 February 2022) was a Slovak writer and politician. A member of the People's Party – Movement for a Democratic Slovakia, he served as Minister of Culture from 1994 to 1998.

Hudec died in Bratislava on 7 February 2022, at the age of 74.
