= Jozef Liščák =

Slovak politician (1947–2022)

3rd Minister of Justice of Slovakia
- In office 13 December 1994 – 30 October 1998
- Preceded by: Milan Hanzel
- Succeeded by: Ján Čarnogurský

Personal details
- Born: 18 January 1947 Svrčinovec, Czechoslovakia
- Died: 13 October 2022 (aged 75)

Jozef Liščák (18 January 1947 – 13 October 2022) was Minister of Justice of Slovakia in third government of Vladimír Mečiar.
