= Gabriel Palacka =

Slovak politician

Minister of Transport and Construction
- In office 30 October 1998 – 11 August 1999
- Prime Minister: Mikuláš Dzurinda
- Preceded by: Ján Jasovský
- Succeeded by: Jozef Macejko

Personal details
- Born: November 7, 1960 (age 65) Komárno, Czechoslovakia (present day Slovakia)
- Party: Christian Democratic Movement; Slovak Democratic Coalition; Slovak Democratic and Christian Union – Democratic Party
- Spouse: Eleonóra Valentová
- Children: 2
- Education: Comenius University

Gabriel Palacka (born 7. November 1960 in Komárno) is a Slovak politician, long term MP of the National Council, who shortly served as the Minister of Transportation from 1998 to 1999.

== Early life ==
Palacka studied computing at the Comenius University and the Slovak University of Technology in Bratislava. In the early 1990s, he worked as a consultant in advisory firm MESA 10 and pursued additional studies at the Georgetown University.

== Political career ==
In 1994 he became an MP of the National Council on the list of Christian Democratic Movement.In 1994 he shortly served as state secretary at the Ministry of Privatization in the technocratic government of Jozef Moravčík. In 1998 he became the Minister of Transport but had to soon resign due to corruption allegations associated with privatization of Slovak Telekom, auctioning of GSM 1800 licenses and the operations of Slovak Airlines. He remained an MP until the end of his term in 2002. In 2003 he retired from politics to take a job at the European Bank for Reconstruction and Development.
