= Krásná Ves =

- Municipality
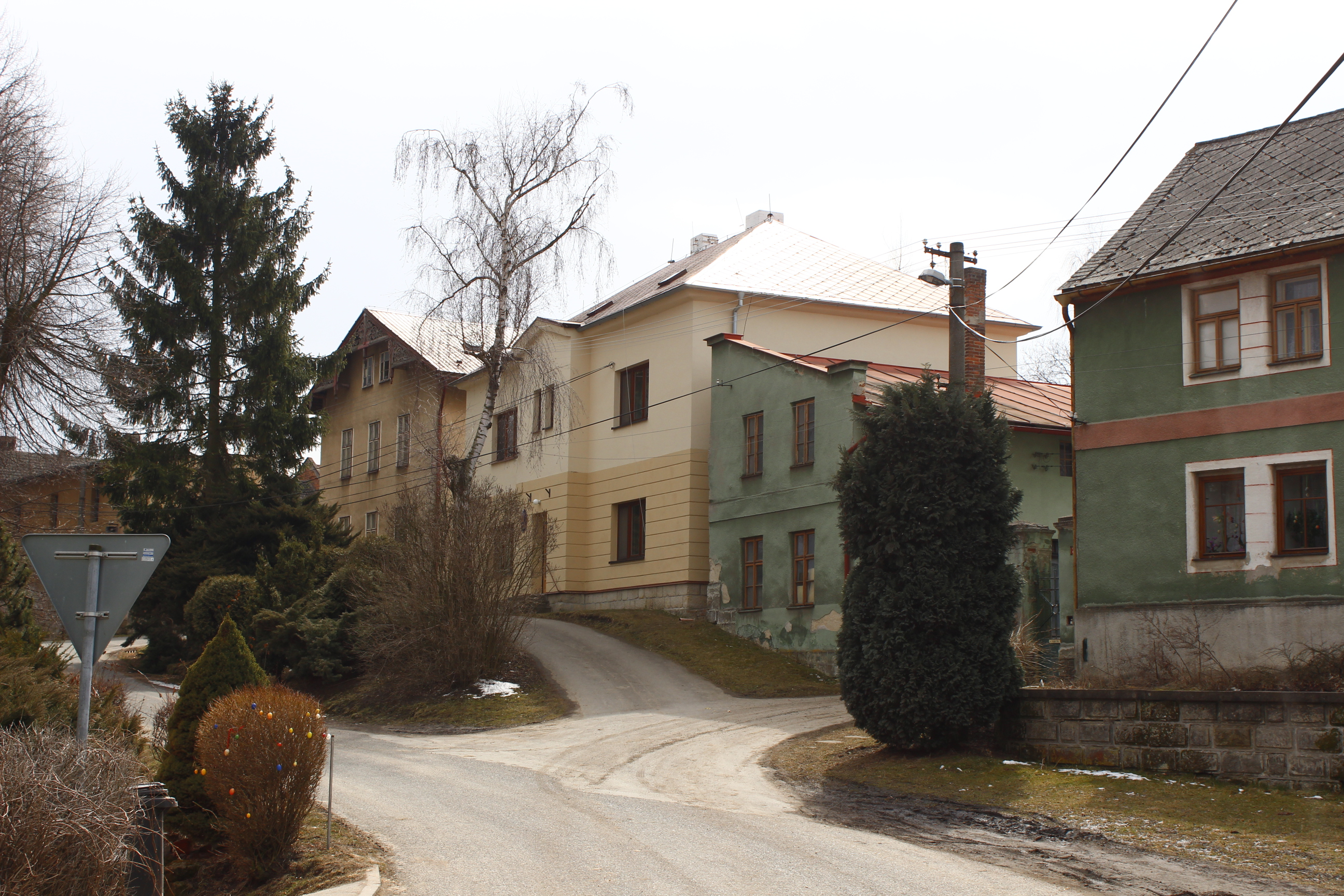
- Municipal office

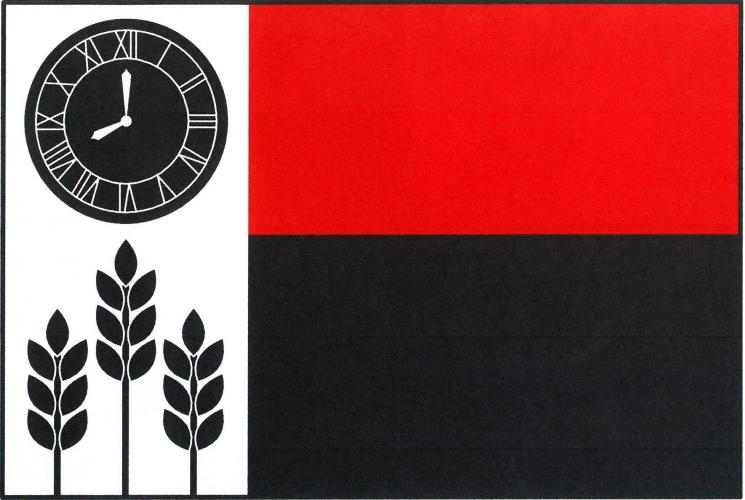
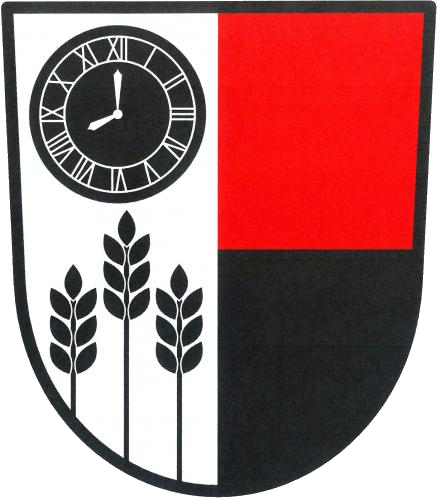
- Flag Coat of arms

- Location in the Czech Republic
- Coordinates: 50°25′29″N 14°47′32″E
- Country: Czech Republic
- Region: Central Bohemian
- District: Mladá Boleslav
- First mentioned: 1388

Area
  - Total: 4.44 km^{2} (1.71 sq mi)
- Elevation: 285 m (935 ft)

Population (2026-01-01)
  - Total: 186
  - Density: 41.9/km^{2} (108/sq mi)
- Time zone: UTC+1 (CET)
  - Summer (DST): UTC+2 (CEST)
- Postal code: 294 25
- Website: krasnaves.cz

Krásná Ves is a municipality and village in Mladá Boleslav District in the Central Bohemian Region of the Czech Republic. It has about 200 inhabitants.

== History ==
The first written mention of Krásná Ves is from 1388.

== Demographics ==
Historical population
Year	Pop.	±%
1869	257	—
1880	291	+13.2%
1890	304	+4.5%
1900	322	+5.9%
1910	363	+12.7%
1921	345	−5.0%
1930	301	−12.8%
1950	221	−26.6%
1961	197	−10.9%
1970	181	−8.1%
1980	192	+6.1%
1991	199	+3.6%
2001	196	−1.5%
2011	193	−1.5%
2021	192	−0.5%
Source: Censuses
