= Jozef Tuchyňa =

Slovak general and politician (1941–2019)

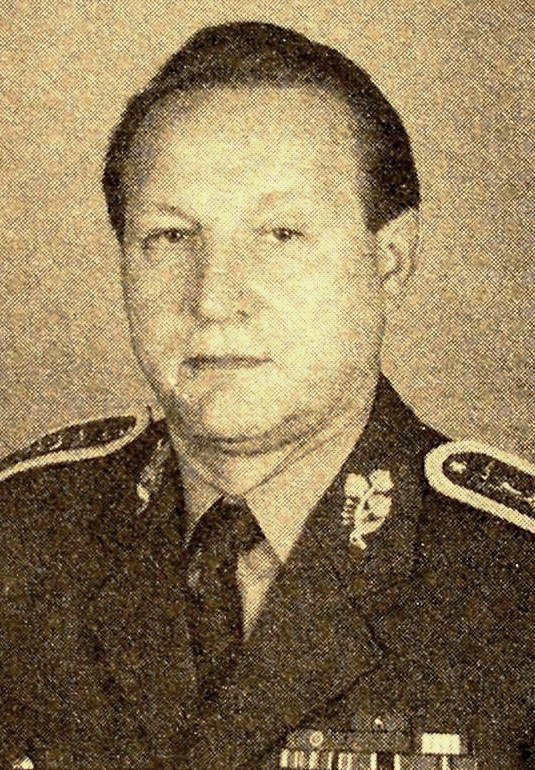

Member of the National Council
- In office 29 October 1998 – 15 October 2002

Minister of Interior
- In office 24 June 1992 – 15 March 1994
- Prime Minister: Vladimír Mečiar
- Preceded by: Ladislav Pittner
- Succeeded by: Ladislav Pittner

Personal details
- Born: 11 November 1941 Krásna Ves, First Slovak Republic
- Died: 9 November 2019 (aged 77) Piešťany, Slovakia
- Party: Party of the Democratic Left (2000–2001)
- Children: 2

Jozef Tuchyňa (11 November 1941 – 9 November 2019) was a Slovak military general and politician. He served as the first Minister of the Interior of the independent Slovakia, the first chief of staff of the Slovak Armed forces and as a Member of the National Council of Slovakia.

== Biography ==
Jozef Tuchyňa was born on 11 November 1941 in the village of Krásna Ves, which is located in the Bánovce nad Bebravou county. In 1963 he completed the military logistics school in Bratislava and joined the Czechoslovak People's Army. Between 1974 and 1977 he studied at the Military Academy in Brno and from 1982 to 1984 he completed his studies at the General Staff Academy in Moscow. Afterwards he served with the command of the 13rd Tank Division in Topoľčany as well as the command of the Eastern Military District in Trenčín. In 1988 he was promoted to general and in 1992 he became the chief commander of the Eastern Military District. In 1992 he resigned from the army and became the minister of Interior Affairs of Slovakia. Following the Dissolution of Czechoslovakia, he became the first interior minister of Slovakia as an independent country. Tuchyňa held the post of the interior minister until 1994.

In 1994 Tuchyňa resumed his military career. He became the first Chief of the General Staff of the newly formed Slovak army. In this role, Tuchyňa contributed to establishment of a new military structure in line with the Western starnards, which led to a conflict with the authoritarian regime of Vladimír Mečiar.

In the 1998 Slovak parliamentary election, Tuchyňa ran for a parliament seat on the list of the Party of the Democratic Left. Due to his political activities he suspended his military role, although he formally retained his position as the Chief of Staff until the elections, resisting the attempts of the government to dismiss him before the elections.

He successfully won a seat in the National Council and retired from the army for good. As a politician, Tuchyňa was nominated by his party for the post of the minister of defense, but failed to win the support of the prime minister Mikuláš Dzurinda and president Rudolf Schuster, both of whom preferred a civilian candidate. When his nomination was withdrawn, Tuchyňa was very vocal about his disappointment and subsequently left the party and served the rest of his term as an independent MP.

Tuchyňa died on 9 November 2019 in Piešťany at the age of 77.
