= Ladislav Pittner =

Slovak politician (1943-2008)

Minister of Interior of Slovakia
- In office 30 October 1998 – 14 May 2001
- Prime Minister: Mikuláš Dzurinda
- Preceded by: Gustáv Krajči
- Succeeded by: Ivan Šimko
- In office 15 March 1994 – 13 December 1994
- Prime Minister: Jozef Moravčík
- Preceded by: Jozef Tuchyňa
- Succeeded by: Ľudovít Hudek

Personal details
- Born: 18 May 1934 Malacky, Czechoslovakia
- Died: 15 August 2008 (aged 74) Bratislava, Slovakia
- Party: Christian Democratic Movement (1990-2000); Slovak Democratic and Christian Union – Democratic Party (from 2000)
- Education: University of Economics in Bratislava

Ladislav Pittner (18 May 1934 – 15 August 2008) was a Slovak politician. He served as the Minister of Interior of Slovakia in 1994 and between 1998 and 2001.

== Biography ==
Ladislav Pittner was born on 18 May 1934 in Malacky. As a high school student, he was involved with an anti-communist dissent group Catholic Action. Due to his participation in dissent, he was expelled from school and from 1951 to 1953 jailed. Afterwards, he worked as a laborer.

In the 1960s, as the repression eased with the advent of the Prague Spring, Pittner was able to graduate from high school and in 1970 graduate from the University of Economics in Bratislava. After graduating, Pittner worked as a researcher in the Institute of economics and organization of construction.

=== Political career ===
After the Velvet Revolution, Pittner shortly worked in the Institute for Defense or Democracy and Constitution, leading research on persecution of dissidents in the communist era. Between November 1990 and June 1992, he served as the Minister of Interior of Slovakia, which was at the time still part of Czechoslovakia. After the Dissolution of Czechoslovakia, Pittner served as the minister of Interior of Slovakia twice - first in the short-lived caretaker government of Jozef Moravčík in 1994 and then again in the First Cabinet of Mikuláš Dzurinda from 1998 to 2001. As a minister, he was criticized by the Party of the Democratic Left, for failing to effectively prosecute the rule of law breaches during the autocratic rule of Vladimír Mečiar and also investigate the murder of former minister Ján Ducký. In response to this criticism, Ducký resigned to preserve the government coalition.

Between 1992 and 2002, Pittner also served as an MP of the National Council of Slovakia. From 2001 to 2003, Pittner served as the chair of the Political prisoner's conference. From 2003 to 2006, he served as the director of the Slovak intelligence agency, Slovak Information Service.

Pittner was a member of the Christian Democratic Movement from its foundation in 1990 until 2000, where he became one of the founding members of the Slovak Democratic and Christian Union – Democratic Party.

== Personal life and death ==
Pittner was married with four children. Pittner died at the age of 74 in the Kramáre hospital in Bratislava, where he was hospitalized after a hart attack on 15 August 2008.
