= Milan Kňažko =

Slovak actor and politician

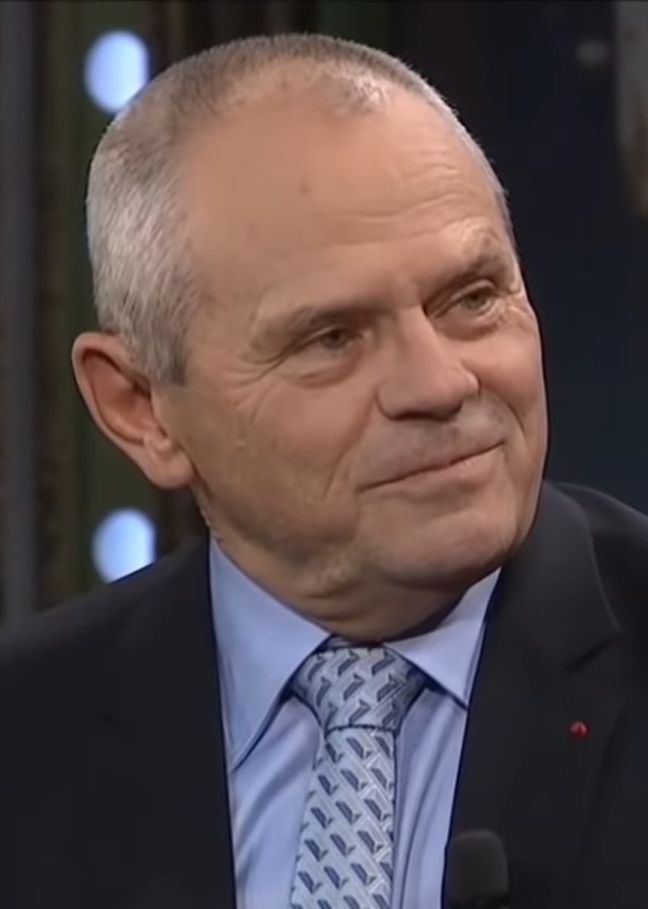

Minister of Culture
- In office 30 October 1998 – 15 October 2002
- Prime Minister: Mikuláš Dzurinda
- Preceded by: Ivan Hudec
- Succeeded by: Rudolf Chmel

Minister of Foreign Affairs
- In office 24 June 1992 – 19 March 1993
- Preceded by: office created
- Succeeded by: Jozef Moravčík

Personal details
- Born: 28 August 1945 (age 80) Horné Plachtince, ČSR
- Party: SDKÚ (2000–present); DÚ (1995-2000); DEÚS (1994-1995); HZDS (1991-1994); VPN (1989-1991); SSO (1967-1989)

Milan Kňažko (born 28 August 1945) is a Slovak actor and politician. He was one of the leading personalities of the Public against Violence movement in November 1989 and one of the most popular faces of the Velvet Revolution in Slovakia.

== Acting ==
Kňažko starred in Devět kruhů pekla, which was screened in the Un Certain Regard section at the 1989 Cannes Film Festival.

He had a key supporting role in the 2007 horror film Hostel: Part II, where he portrayed Sasha, the leader and manager of the Elite Hunting Club.

From 2016–2019 he starred in a Czech translation of the play Shylock by Canadian playwright Mark Leiren-Young at Divadlo Na Jezerce in Prague. The play was filmed and shown as a television special on Czech TV.

== Selected filmography ==
- Zánik samoty Berhof (1983)
- Dobří holubi se vracejí (1987)
- Devět kruhů pekla (1988)
- The Last Butterfly (1990)
- Normal (2009)
- Jan Hus (2015)

== Awards ==
On 19 November 2024, Knazko was awarded the 24th Hanno R Ellenbogen Citizenship Award at the Palffy Palace, Bratislava, at a ceremony also honoring Cardinal Dominik Duka (25th), Yevgeniya Chirikova (23rd) and Barbara Day by the Prague Society for International Cooperation and Global Panel Foundation as part of the 35th Commemoration of the Velvet Revolution and 25th Hanno R Ellenbogen Citizenship Award Ceremony.
