= Krásna Ves =

- Municipality
- Flag

- Location of Krásna Ves in the Trenčín Region Location of Krásna Ves in Slovakia
- Coordinates: 48.83°N 18.23°E
- Country: Slovakia
- Region: Trenčín Region
- District: Bánovce nad Bebravou District
- First mentioned: 1208

Area
  - Total: 10.21 km^{2} (3.94 sq mi)
- Elevation: 256 m (840 ft)

Population (2025)
  - Total: 479
- Time zone: UTC+1 (CET)
  - Summer (DST): UTC+2 (CEST)
- Postal code: 956 53
- Area code: +421 38
- Vehicle registration plate (until 2022): BN
- Website: www.krasnaves.sk

Krásna Ves (Hungarian: Bánkaraszna) is a village and municipality in Bánovce nad Bebravou District in the Trenčín Region of north-western Slovakia.

== History ==
In historical records the village was first mentioned in 1208.

== Geography ==
The municipality lies at an altitude of 256 metres (840 ft) and covers an area of 10.21 km^{2} (3.94 sq mi) (2025). It lies at the southwest foot of the Strážov Mountains, on the upper part of the Bebrava river.

== Population ==
Population statistic (10 years)
Year	1995	2005	2015	2025
Count	509	508	527	479
Difference		−0.19%	+3.74%	−9.10%

Population statistic
Year	2024	2025
Count	470	479
Difference		+1.91%

It has a population of 479 people (31 December 2025).

=== Ethnicity ===
Census 2021 (1+ %)
Ethnicity	Number	Fraction
Slovak	490	98.79%
Not found out	5	1%
Total	496	

In year 2021 was 496 people by ethnicity 490 as Slovak, 5 as Not found out, 3 as Other, 2 as Czech, 2 as Rusyn and 1 as Hungarian.

Note on population: The difference values of population numbers in the table "Population statistic" and in the sections "Ethnicity" & "Religion" is caused by the use of various statistical methods.

=== Religion ===
Census 2021 (1+ %)
Religion	Number	Fraction
Roman Catholic Church	292	58.87%
Evangelical Church	107	21.57%
None	82	16.53%
Not found out	7	1.41%
Total	496	

In year 2021 was 496 people by religion 292 from Roman Catholic Church, 107 from Evangelical Church, 82 from None, 7 from Not found out, 2 from Greek Catholic Church, 2 from Ad hoc movements, 1 from Jehovah's Witnesses, 1 from Other, 1 from United Methodist Church and 1 from Buddhism.

== Notable people ==
- Jozef Tuchyňa (1941–2019) – Slovak general and politician
