= Milan Hanzel =

Slovak politician and lawyer (1947–2008)

2nd Minister of Justice of Slovakia
- In office 16 March 1994 – 13 December 1994
- Preceded by: Katarína Tóthová
- Succeeded by: Jozef Liščák

Personal details
- Born: 21 April 1947 Košice, Czechoslovakia
- Died: 22 November 2008 (aged 61) Bratislava, Slovakia

Milan Hanzel (21 April 1947, Košice – 22 November 2008, Bratislava) was the former Minister of Justice of Slovakia in government of Jozef Moravčík. He received his law degree from Comenius University in 1970. He died after an accident on 22 November 2008.
