= Limbach, Slovakia =

Limbach Hliník
- Municipality
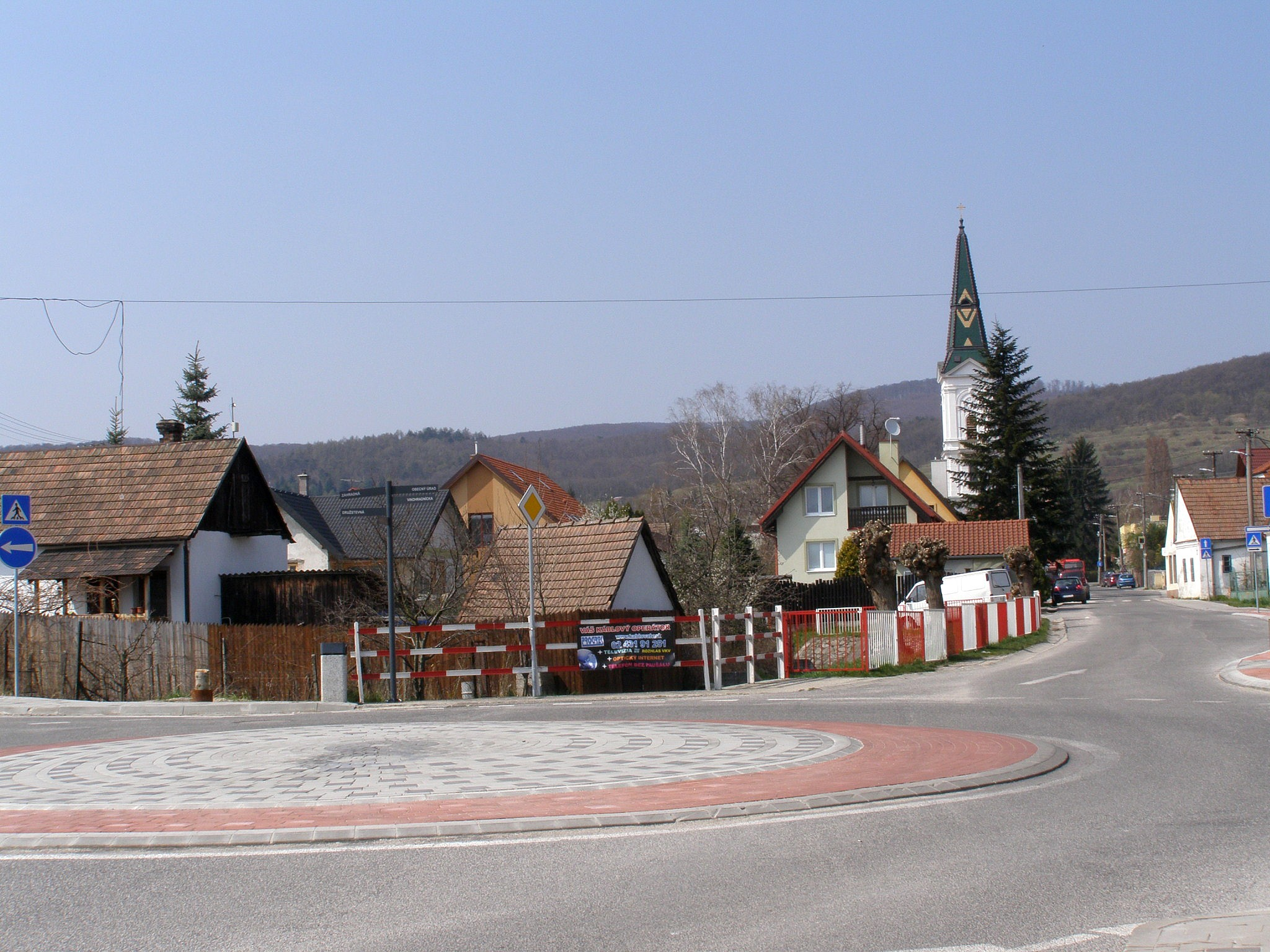
- Center of village

- Flag

- Location of Limbach in the Bratislava Region Location of Limbach in Slovakia
- Coordinates: 48.28°N 17.22°E
- Country: Slovakia
- Region: Bratislava Region
- District: Pezinok District
- First mentioned: 1390

Government
  - Mayor: Adriana Čechovičová

Area
  - Total: 15.37 km^{2} (5.93 sq mi)
- Elevation: 192 m (630 ft)

Population (2025)
  - Total: 2,449
- Time zone: UTC+1 (CET)
  - Summer (DST): UTC+2 (CEST)
- Postal code: 900 91
- Area code: +421 33
- Vehicle registration plate (until 2022): PK
- Website: www.limbach.sk

Limbach (historically in Slovak: Hliník, German: Limbach, Hungarian: Limpak) is a municipality in western Slovakia in Pezinok District in the Bratislava Region, under the Little Carpathians. It is particularly well known for its production of wine.

== Geography ==
The municipality lies at an altitude of 192 metres (630 ft) and covers an area of 15.37 km^{2} (5.93 sq mi) (2025).

== History ==
The town was established around 1350, when Béla IV of Hungary invited German settlers to inhabit lands. However, it is first time mentioned in 1390. The village remained predominantly German until 1945, when most of them were expelled from Slovakia to Germany and were replaced by settlers from the regions around Myjava, Stará Turá, and Bošáca.

After World War II, when the Slovaks renamed towns and villages with German names, Limbach was briefly known as Hlinik, but the German name has remained and is now again the official name of the town.

Today, Limbach is a popular location for secondary residences for rich residents of Bratislava. The former president of Slovakia Ivan Gašparovič has a residence there.

== Population ==
Population statistic (10 years)
| Year | 1995 | 2005 | 2015 | 2025 |
|---|---|---|---|---|
| Count | 931 | 1386 | 1959 | 2449 |
| Difference | | +48.87% | +41.34% | +25.01% |

Population statistic
| Year | 2024 | 2025 |
|---|---|---|
| Count | 2428 | 2449 |
| Difference | | +0.86% |

It has a population of 2449 people (31 December 2025).

=== Ethnicity ===
Census 2021 (1+ %)
| Ethnicity | Number | Fraction |
|---|---|---|
| Slovak | 2125 | 92.91% |
| Not found out | 117 | 5.11% |
| Czech | 26 | 1.13% |
| Hungarian | 26 | 1.13% |
| Total | 2287 | |

In year 2021 was 2287 people by ethnicity 2125 as Slovak, 117 as Not found out, 26 as Czech, 26 as Hungarian, 13 as Russian, 13 as German, 9 as Rusyn, 5 as Ukrainian, 5 as Bulgarian, 4 as Other, 4 as English, 3 as Serbian, 2 as Austrian, 1 as Irish, 1 as Romani, 1 as Polish, 1 as Moravian and 1 as Canadian.

Note on population: The difference values of population numbers in the table "Population statistic" and in the sections "Ethnicity" & "Religion" is caused by the use of various statistical methods.

=== Religion ===
Census 2021 (1+ %)
| Religion | Number | Fraction |
|---|---|---|
| Roman Catholic Church | 930 | 40.66% |
| None | 797 | 34.85% |
| Evangelical Church | 330 | 14.43% |
| Not found out | 110 | 4.81% |
| Greek Catholic Church | 46 | 2.01% |
| Total | 2287 | |

In year 2021 was 2287 people by religion 930 from Roman Catholic Church, 797 from None, 330 from Evangelical Church, 110 from Not found out, 46 from Greek Catholic Church, 12 from Other, 10 from Calvinist Church, 9 from Buddhism, 9 from Apostolic Church, 9 from Ad hoc movements, 7 from Eastern Orthodox Church, 7 from Christian Congregations in Slovakia, 4 from Other and not ascertained christian church, 3 from Paganism and natural spirituality, 1 from Jehovah's Witnesses, 1 from Islam, 1 from Hinduism and 1 from United Methodist Church.
