= Daniel Zmeko =

Slovak general

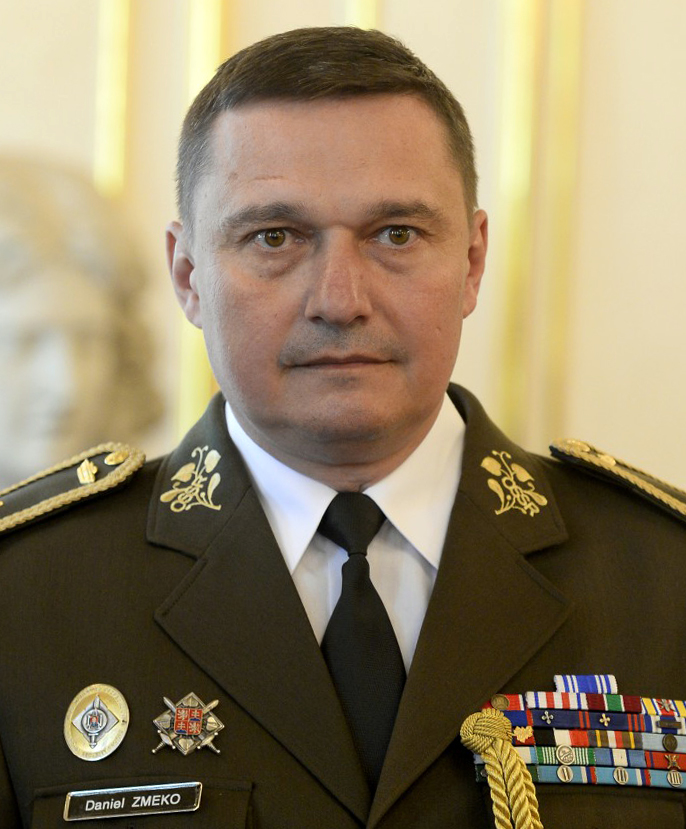
General Daniel Zmeko (2015)

General Daniel Zmeko (born November 24, 1967, in Nové Mesto nad Váhom) is a Slovak military leader who is the current Chief of the General Staff of the Slovak Armed Forces.

== Biography ==
Zmeko was born on 24 November 1967 in Nové Mesto nad Váhom in the then-Czechoslovak Socialist Republic. He joined the Czechoslovak People's Army in 1982 at the age of 14. He attended the Military Secondary High School in Banská Bystrica from 1982 to 1986, and he was enrolled in the Land Forces College at Vyškov na Morave from 1986 to 1990.

He was one of the first to complete the National Defense Course at the Armed Forces Academy of General Milan Rastislav Štefánik. He served during Operation Iraqi Freedom.

On 26 April 2018, Zmeko was appointed to this post and promoted to lieutenant general. His position and rank entered into force on 7 May. Prior to his appointment, he was the Director General of the Modernization and Infrastructure Section of the Ministry of Defense. He was promoted to the rank of general on 28 May 2019.

== Personal life ==
Zmeko is married and has two children. He speaks English and Russian alongside the Slovak language. His hobbies include studying military history and fishing.
