= Marián Andel =

Slovak politician

Marián Andel (born 10 September 1950, in Modra) is a Slovak politician. He was elected to the National Council of the Slovak Republic under the Slovak National Party in the terms 1994-1998 and 1998 -2002. In the parliamentary elections in 2006 he was a candidate for SLNKO.
