= Dušan Slobodník =

Slovak politician

Dušan Slobodník (11 April 1927, Pezinok - 13 December 2001, Bratislava) was a Slovak literary theoretician, translator and politician.

== Early life ==
He attended the elementary school and high school in Zvolen. In February and March 1945 (at the time of the First Slovak Republic), as a member of the semi-obligatory organisation Hlinka Youth, he is said to have participated in a training course led by the German secret service in Sekule.

At the end of World War II, before he could pass the matura, he was abducted by the Soviet SMERSH into a Russian gulag, where he spent the years 1945 - 1954 (he was supposed to spend 15 years there, but was released after Joseph Stalin's death on an amnesty).

Back in Slovakia, he passed his matura and started to study Slovak language and literature in Bratislava. He was excluded by the Communists from the school for being "politically unreliable". He was rehabilitated in 1960 and finished his studies in Prague.

He was an employee of the Slovak Academy of Sciences from 1962 and after the Velvet Revolution (in 1990) became the director of its Institute of World Literature.

== Political career ==
As a member of the HZDS party, which won the elections in 1992, he was Slovakia's Minister of Culture from 1992 to 1994. Afterwards (1994 - 2001), he was deputy to the parliament (National Council of the Slovak Republic) for his party and from 1994 - 1998 the chairman of the Foreign Affairs Committee of the parliament.

In 1992, he was involved in the legal case Feldek vs. Slobodník (see Ľubomír Feldek for details).

== Work ==
He translated modern Russian, English and French literature (e.g. Isaac Asimov's Foundation) into Slovak. He described his experience in the Russian gulag in the book Paragraf:Polárny kruh (Section:Polar Circle; 1991). He specialised in modern world literature. Theoretical problems are dealt with e.g. in the book Vedecké a literárne poznanie (Scientific and Literary Knowledge; 1988), and in the monographs Genéza a poetika science fiction (Genesis and Poetics of Science Fiction; 1981) and Teória a prax básnického prekladu (Theory and Practice of Poetical Translation; 1990).

== See also ==
- Ľubomír Feldek
- Ernest Valko
