= Pavol Kanis =

Slovak politician (born 1948)

Minister of Defense of Slovakia
- In office 30 October 1998 – 2 January 2001
- Prime Minister: Mikuláš Dzurinda
- Preceded by: Ján Sitek
- Succeeded by: Jozef Stank
- In office 15 March 1994 – 13 December 1994
- Prime Minister: Jozef Moravčík
- Preceded by: Imrich Andrejčák
- Succeeded by: Ján Sitek

Personal details
- Born: 27 August 1948 (age 78) Prague, Czechoslovakia
- Party: Party of the Democratic Left
- Education: Comenius University

Pavol Kanis (born 27 August 1948) is a Slovak politician. He served as the Minister of Defense of Slovakia in 1994 and between 1998 and 2001.

== Biography ==
Pavol Kanis was born on 27 August 1948 in Prague. He grew up in on a farm in the village of Visolaje. Between 1967 and 1972 Kanis studied philosophy and law at the Comenius University.

After graduation, Kanis worked as the deputy director of the Institute of Marxism–Leninism of the Central Committee of the Communist Party of Slovakia. After the Velvet Revolution, he was instrumental in transformation of the Communist party into the Party of the Democratic Left, in which he served as the deputy chairman.

=== Political career ===
Between 1990 and 1992 he served as a Deputy of the Federal Assembly and from 1992 to 2002 as an MP of the National Council of Slovakia. He served as the Minister of Defense twice - first in the short-lived caretaker government of Jozef Moravčík in 1994 and then again in the First Cabinet of Mikuláš Dzurinda from 1998 to 2001. As a minister, he was accused of promoting "old guard" officers inherited from the Czechoslovak People's Army at the expense of younger, foreign-educated officers and personally benefiting from kickbacks associated with purchase of Mig 29 fighter jets from Russia.

In 2000, Kanis begun construction of a four-storey luxury villa in Koliba, an upscale neighborhood of Bratislava. After a controversial press conference, where Kanis attributed his wealth to successful sports betting, he was forced to resign as a minister and retire from politics after the end of his parliamentary mandate in 2002.

After the end of his political career, Kanis produced several documentaries about the life of Milan Rastislav Štefánik.
