= Ján Ducký =

Slovak politician

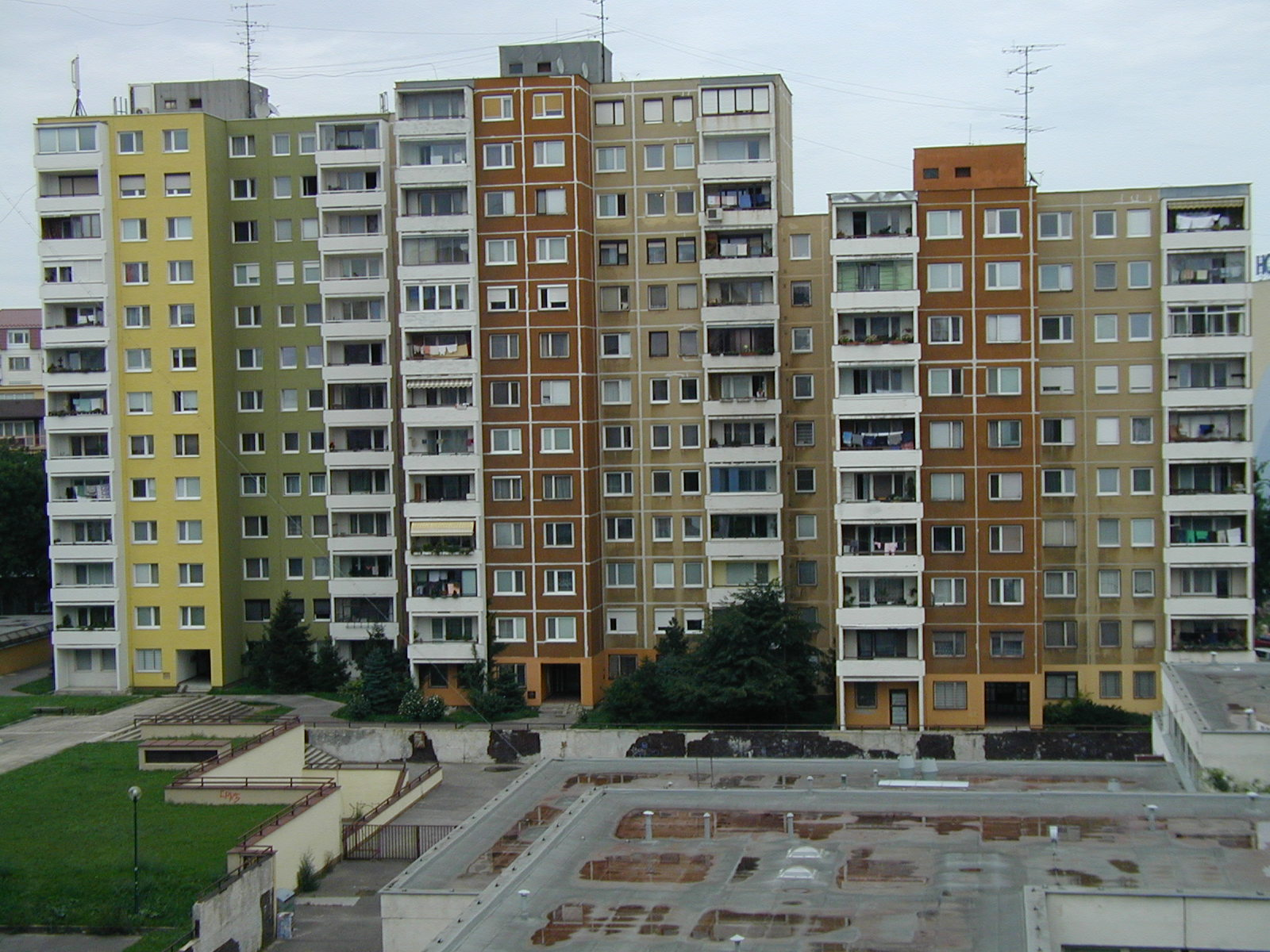
Bajzova Street in Bratislava, Ján Ducký was murdered in the middle apartment house

Ján Ducký, Ing. (January 30, 1944 – January 11, 1999) was a Slovak politician, former Minister in three different Slovak governments and Director of SPP (Slovak Gas Industry). Ducký was one of the key privatisation oligarchs under Vladimír Mečiar's government and he was the author of the infamous Duckého zmenky, the sum owed on the promissory notes was left blank. He was shot dead in the hallway of an apartment house in Bratislava where he lived in 1999. The crime has not been solved.

== Early life and education ==
Ducký was born in Lehota pod Vtáčnikom. He graduated from University of Economics in Bratislava in 1967, specializing in economics and administration of industrial companies.

He began his career working at trade sections of state-owned textile companies Merina Trenčín and Slovakotex Trenčín. From 1983 to 1989 he was employed at the Ministry of Industry of Slovakia as the Director of the trade section and later Vice Minister. From 1991 to 1992 he worked in Vienna in česko-slovenská majetková účast. In March 1993, he was elected the President of Slovak industry union (Slovak: Zväz priemyslu SR). Since 1996, Ducký was the Director of Slovenský plynárenský priemysel SPP, one of the biggest companies in Slovakia.

== Political career ==
Until 1994, Ducký was a member of Communist Party of Slovakia (KSS) and through this party he became a minister in Čič's government of national understanding. Since 1994, Ducký was a member of Hnutie za demokratické Slovensko (HZDS), the political party of Vladimír Mečiar. In 1994 he was elected into the Slovak parliament on the HZDS ticket.

- December 12, 1989 – June 26, 1990 – Minister of Industry (Slovak: Minister priemyslu) in the government of national understanding
- November 10, 1993 – March 15, 1994 – Minister of Industry (Slovak: Minister hospodárstva) in the government of Vladimír Mečiar
- December 13, 1994 – August 27, 1996 – Minister of Industry (Slovak: Minister hospodárstva) in the government of Vladimír Mečiar

== Death ==
Ján Ducký's body when found by the police, the only picture known to be released

Ján Ducký was gunned down on January 11, 1999 in Bratislava. According to Chief Investigator at the Interior Ministry Jaroslav Ivor, the killer waited at the common ground-floor mailboxes for Ducký to emerge. Around 1 p.m. in broad daylight, four 7.65 caliber bullets were fired at Ducký, killing him.

On May 28, 1999, Slovak police formally charged Oleg T. (29) a.k.a. Alex with the murder, a Ukrainian with a legal residence in Kyiv but living in Slovakia. Since 1999, Oleg T. had been living with the head of his Mafia group, a fellow Ukrainian Ivan Miskov in Ivanka pri Dunaji. He worked as his bodyguard and manager. In 2000, Oleg T. was freed by the Regional court in Bratislava (Slovak: Krajský súd v Bratislave).

Investigation finally ended in July 2007. The accused was the same man, they already released - Oleg K. (who changed his legal family name in the meantime). Oleg K. could not be localized and he is presumed to be in Ukraine.

== See also ==
- Crime in Slovakia
- Ernest Valko
