= Katarína Tóthová =

Slovak politician

Member of the National Council of the Slovak Republic
- In office October 30, 1998 – June 12, 2010
- In office March 14, 1994 – December 13, 1994

Deputy Prime Minister of Slovakia
- In office December 13, 1994 – October 30, 1998
- Prime Minister: Vladimír Mečiar

Minister of Justice of Slovakia
- In office January 1, 1993 – March 14, 1994
- Prime Minister: Vladimír Mečiar
- Preceded by: office created
- Succeeded by: Milan Hanzel

Minister of Justice of Slovak Republic
- In office June 24, 1992 – December 31, 1992
- Preceded by: Ivan Šimko
- Succeeded by: office abolished

Personal details
- Born: February 6, 1940 (age 86) Bratislava, First Slovak Republic
- Party: People's Party - Movement for a Democratic Slovakia
- Spouse: Ľudovít Tóth (m. 1961; died 2011)

Katarína Tóthová (born February 6, 1940, in Bratislava) is a former Deputy Prime Minister of Slovakia and 1st Minister of Justice of Slovakia and a long term Member of National Council of the Slovak Republic representing the People's Party – Movement for a Democratic Slovakia.

== Early life ==
Katarína Tóthová was born in Bratislava, she was a high school classmate of the actor Milan Lasica. She graduated in Law at the Comenius University in Bratislava in 1962. She has been active as a Law Professor at the university since her graduation until at least 2021. In 1989, a fellow Law School professor Milan Čič, who acted as the last Communist prime minister, offered her the post of Justice Minister. At the time Tóthová did not feel ready for the job, fearing that political involvement would discredit her academic work. In 1992 she was offered the Government post again, this time by the prime minister Vladimír Mečiar. Tóthová accepted the offer.

== Political career ==
In the 90s, Tóthová served as Minister of Justice (1993-1994) and Deputy Prime Minister (1994-1998) in two governments of the autocratic prime minister Vladimír Mečiar, accused by the opposition and the European Union of widespread corruption and disrespect for human and civil rights. While Tóthová herself was not personally involved in major scandals, she was a prominent face of the ruling Movement for a Democratic Slovakia (HZDS) and an outspoken advocate of the government, claiming that Slovakia was a victim of a "systematic campaign of libel and disinformation".

Tóthová was among the Mečiar's loyalist minister who received significant bonuses from the prime minister. After the change of government, some courts ruled that the prime minister was not authorized to pay bonuses to the ministers and that such payments had to be returned, while other courts did not order the former ministers to pay back the bonuses. Tóthová had to pay back over 250,000 Slovak crowns, about a half of what she received, which she saw as discrimination, given that other ministers did not have to pay back the bonus payments they received.

During Tóthová's time in the government, the firm owned by her husband and son in law won many government contracts. According to Tóthová this was not a problem as the firm paid taxes and always delivered on time.

After the defeat HZDS suffered in the 1998 Slovak parliamentary election, Tóthová became an MP of the National Council. She was not elected in the 2002 Slovak parliamentary election, however she returned to parliament as a replacement for the MP Gabriel Karlín sentenced for corruption and later for another MP, Irena Belohorská, who became a Member of the European Parliament. She was again elected in the 2006 Slovak parliamentary election After the 2010 Slovak parliamentary election defeat, when HZDS lost all its parliamentary seats, she retired from politics.

== Personal life ==
Tóthová was married to Ľudovít Tóth, a professor at the University of Economics in Bratislava. He died in 2011, shortly before their 50th wedding anniversary. They had one daughter together. Her granddaughter is married to ŠK Slovan Bratislava forward Vladimír Weiss.
