= Slovenský plynárenský priemysel =

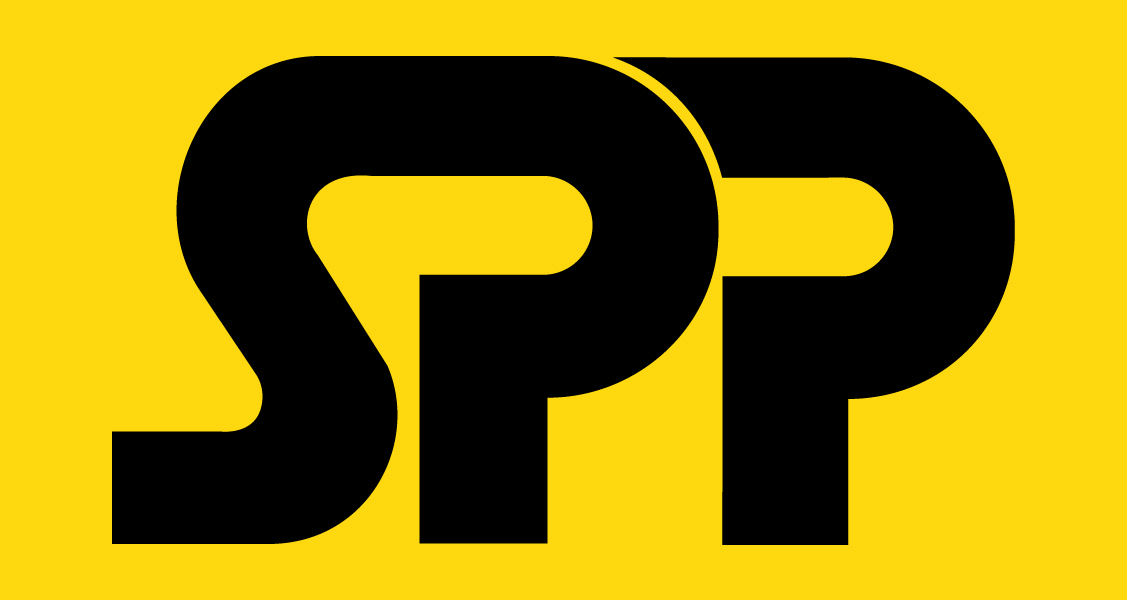
- Company type: private
- Industry: Oil and gas Electricity
- Headquarters: Bratislava, Slovakia
- Products: Natural gas Electric power
- Services: natural gas transmission, distribution and sale
- Revenue: 1,526,000,000 euro (2018)
- Net income: 313,600,000 euro (2018)
- Owner: Ministry of Economy of the Slovak Republic
- Number of employees: 681 (2018)
- Subsidiaries: SPP CNG SPP Infrastructure
- Website: www.spp.sk

Slovenský plynárenský priemysel, a.s. (abbr. SPP; Slovak: literally Slovak Gas Industry) is a state-owned energy supplier headquartered in Bratislava, Slovakia. The company follows on from over 150 years of gas industry in Slovakia. It is the biggest natural gas seller in Slovakia. In addition to natural gas, it sells CNG and LNG, and supplies electricity.

On 1 July 2006, the company completed the legal unbundling, while according to the requirements of Slovak and European legislation, the companies SPP – preprava, a.s., nowadays Eustream, active in the area of international gas transmission, and SPP – distribúcia, a.s. in the area of natural gas distribution commence their activities.

In 2014, the Government of Slovakia became a sole owner of the company.

In 2019, the company was selected by the state as a single buyers of renewable power in Slovakia for 2020–2021. Slovakia uses 5 billion cubic meters of natural gas per year. In 2022, SPP ordered 32% of its supplies as pipe gas from Norway, and 34% as shipborne LNG via several countries.

In 2024, SPP entered into a short-term pilot contract to buy natural gas from Azerbaijan to reduce the impact of the Ukrainian closure of the pipeline for Russian supplies in 2025. Transfer will be by the Trans-Balkan pipeline, or possibly via Russia and the TurkStream pipeline across the Black Sea, then Turkey, Bulgaria, Serbia and Hungary. The contract could be extended into a longer-term deal.
