= Ľudovít Černák =

Slovak businessman and politician (born 1951)

Ľudovít Černák (born 12 October 1951 in Hliník nad Hronom) is a Slovak former politician, businessman and the chairman of the Slovak football club ŠK Slovan Bratislava. A graduate of the Slovak Technical College in Bratislava, he also graduated as an internal aspirant from the Technical College in Košice. In 1990 he completed a three-month Management and Marketing course from the Sandwell College of F and HE. In September 1989, he was chosen as the general director of ZSNP (a Slovak metallurgy company). In the 1992 elections, he was chosen to be a member of the Slovak National Council where he was again selected as a member of the government of the Slovak Republic and entrusted to perform the function of the minister of economics of the Slovak Republic. From 1993 to 1994 he served as the deputy prime minister of the National Council of the Slovak Republic and from 1994 to 1998 he was a member of parliament in the National Council of the Slovak Republic. From 1998 to 1999 he was again chosen to be the minister of economics. In April 2000 he established Sitno Holding, a.s., where he is the chairman of the board of directors. In late 2004, he acquired 100% shares in ŠK Slovan Bratislava – Slovak football team that time in deep crisis. His family managed the team until 2009 when brought back to European competitions and sold to other Slovak influential businessman Ivan Kmotrik.

== Political career ==
- 1992–93, Minister of Economy
- 1992–94, leader of the Slovak National Party
- 1994–95, leader of the New Alternative
- 1995–97, member and leader of the Democratic Union
- 1998–unknown, member of the Slovak Democratic Coalition
- 1998–99, Minister of Economy
- 2006– ongoing, honorary consul of Uzbekistan
