= Ministry of Culture (Slovakia) =

Government ministry of Slovakia

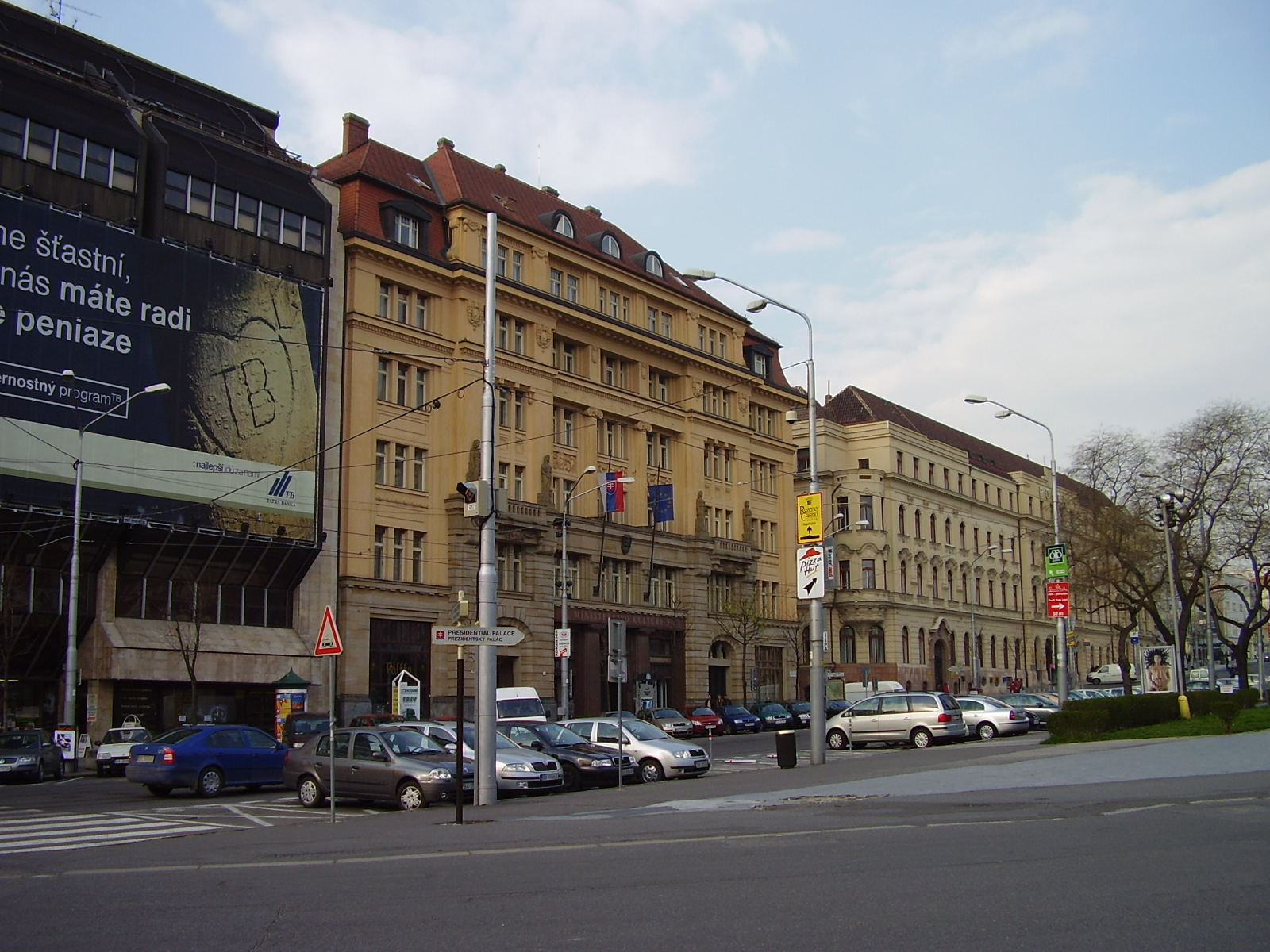
Bank Palace (centre), the head office of the ministry

The Ministry of Culture of the Slovak Republic (Slovak: Ministerstvo kultúry Slovenskej republiky) is a government ministry of Slovakia. Its headquarters are in Bratislava.
