= Jan Stráský =

Czech politician (1940–2019), Final Prime Minister of Czechoslovakia in 1992

Ján Stráský
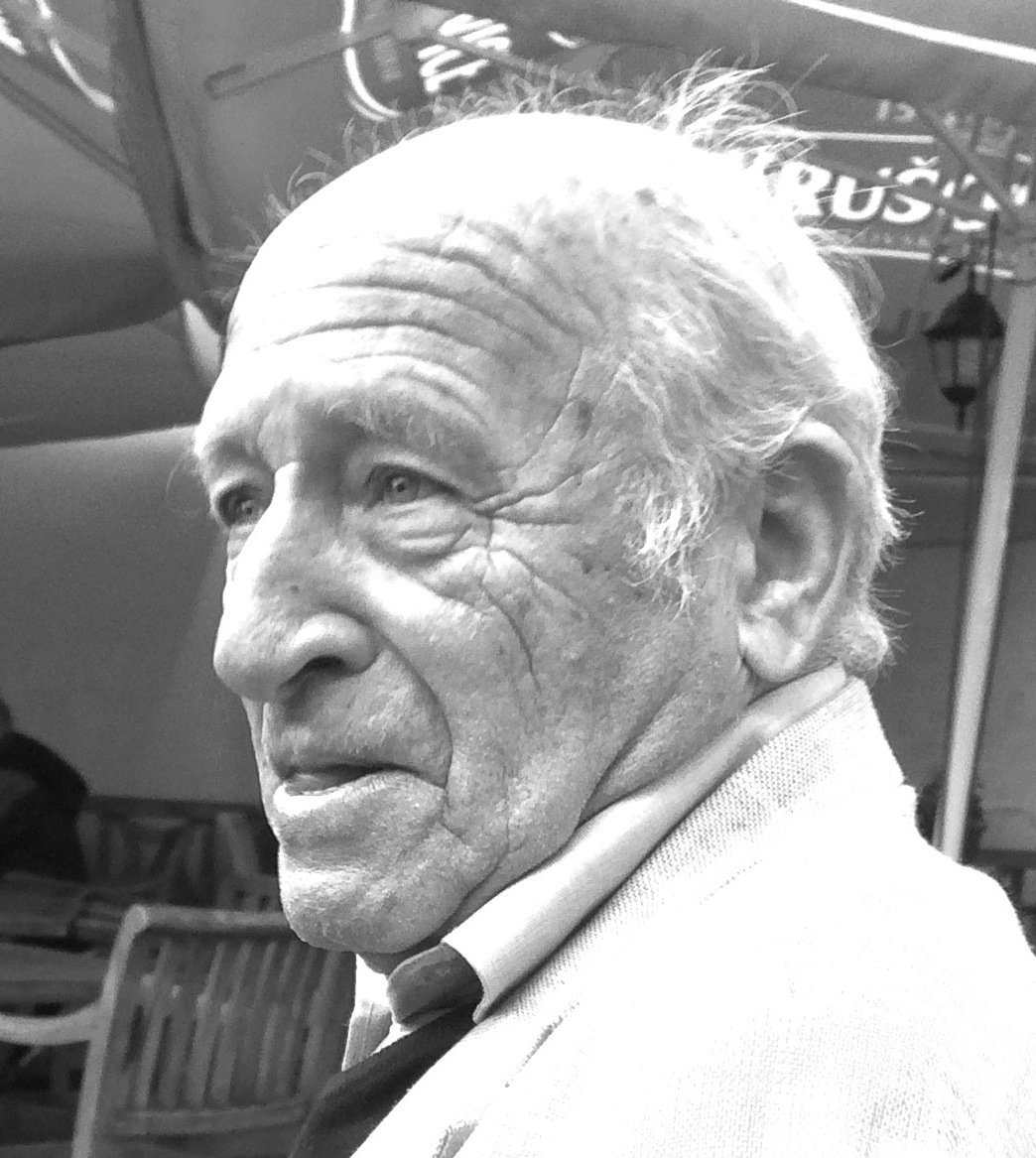

Prime Minister of Czechoslovakia
- In office 2 July 1992 – 31 December 1992
- President: Václav Havel
- Preceded by: Marián Čalfa
- Succeeded by: Office abolished

Personal details
- Born: 24 December 1940 Plzeň, Protectorate of Bohemia and Moravia
- Died: 6 November 2019 (aged 78) Prague, Czech Republic
- Political party: KSČ (1964–1969); ODS (1991–1998); US–DEU (1998–2001)

Jan Stráský (24 December 1940 – 6 November 2019) was a Czech politician. He served as the last prime minister of Czechoslovakia in 1992.

== Biography ==
Stráský studied philosophy and political economy at the Charles University in Prague. From 1958 to 1990 he worked at the Central bank of Czechoslovakia. From 1964 to 1969 he was a member of the Communist Party of Czechoslovakia.

In 1991 Stráský became a member of the Civic Democratic Party. From 1992 he was a member of parliament, minister of transportation (1993–1995), and minister of health (1995–1996). From 2 July to 31 December 1992 he served as prime minister. When Czechoslovak President Václav Havel resigned on 20 July 1992 due to his disagreement with the dissolution of Czechoslovakia, Stráský also took on some presidential duties until the country was formally dissolved at the end of 1992.

From 2001 to 2006 Stráský was the regional head of government in the South Bohemian Region, at which point he left politics. From 2011 to 2012, he was the director of Šumava National Park.

He died on 6 November 2019, aged 78.

== See also ==
- History of Czechoslovakia
- List of prime ministers of Czechoslovakia

Government offices
| Preceded by Marián Čalfa | Prime Minister of Czechoslovakia; 1992 | Succeeded by (none) |
| Preceded by (none) | Minister of Transportation of the Czech Republic; 1992–1995 | Succeeded by Vladimír Budínský |
| Preceded by Luděk Rubáš | Minister of Health of the Czech Republic; 1995–1998 | Succeeded by Zuzana Roithová |
