= Bobrov, Slovakia =

Village and municipality in Slovakia

Bobrov
- Municipality
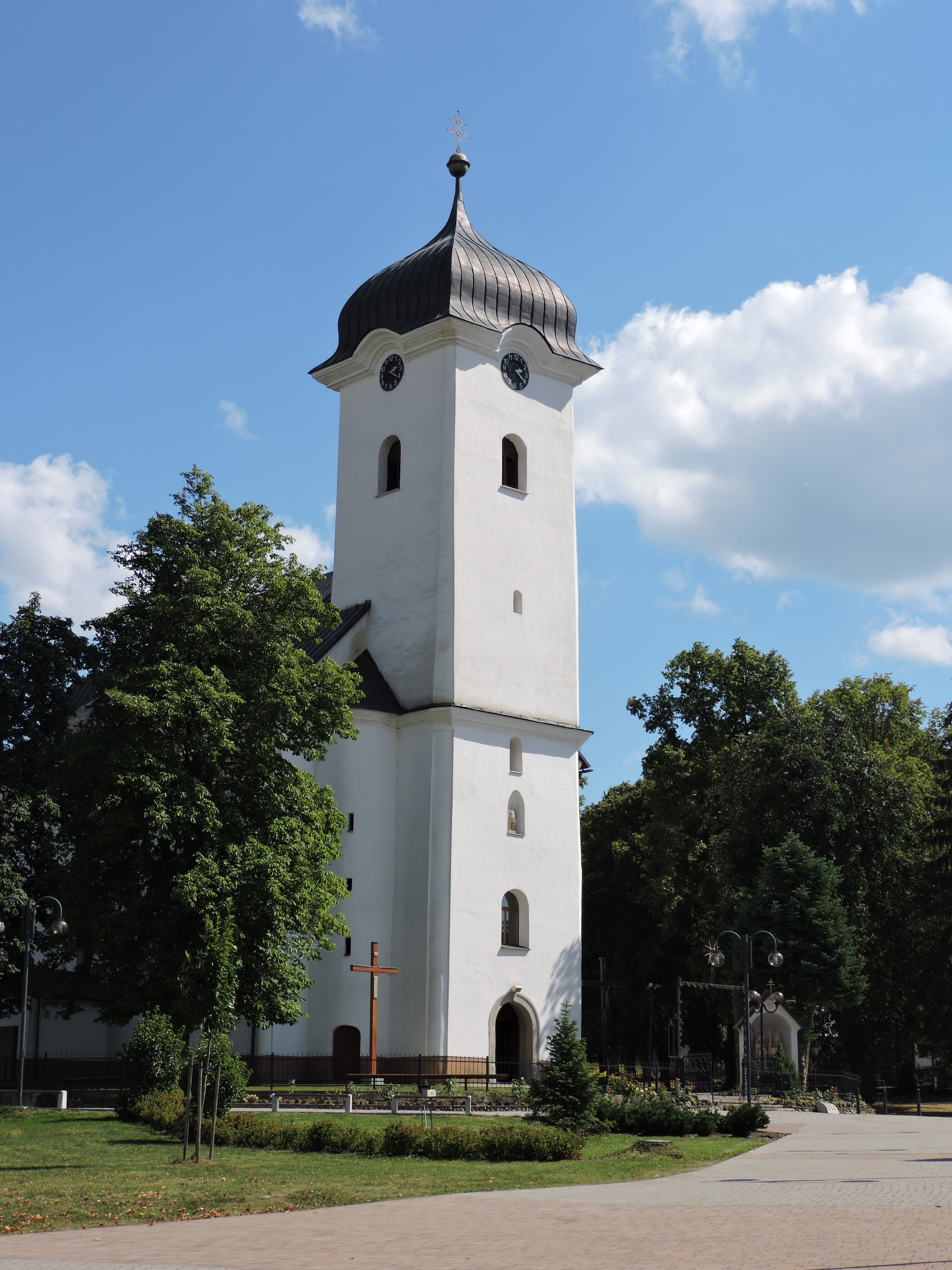
- Roman Catholic church

- Flag

- Location of Bobrov in the Žilina Region Location of Bobrov in Slovakia
- Coordinates: 49°26′N 19°33′E
- Country: Slovakia
- Region: Žilina Region
- District: Námestovo District
- First mentioned: 1564

Area
  - Total: 25.75 km^{2} (9.94 sq mi)
- Elevation: 604 m (1,982 ft)

Population (2025)
  - Total: 2,131
- Time zone: UTC+1 (CET)
  - Summer (DST): UTC+2 (CEST)
- Postal code: 294 2
- Area code: +421 43
- Vehicle registration plate (until 2022): NO
- Website: www.obecbobrov.sk

Bobrov (Hungarian: Bobró) is a village and municipality in Námestovo District in the Žilina Region of northern Slovakia.

== History ==
In historical records the village was first mentioned in 1564.

== Geography ==
The municipality lies at an altitude of 604 metres (1,982 ft) and covers an area of 25.75 km^{2} (9.94 sq mi) (2025).

== Population ==
Population statistic (10 years)
Year	1995	2005	2015	2025
Count	1438	1539	1753	2131
Difference		+7.02%	+13.90%	+21.56%

Population statistic
Year	2024	2025
Count	2084	2131
Difference		+2.25%

It has a population of 2131 people (31 December 2025).

=== Ethnicity ===
Census 2021 (1+ %)
Ethnicity	Number	Fraction
Slovak	1856	97.02%
Not found out	55	2.87%
Total	1913	

In year 2021 was 1913 people by ethnicity 1856 as Slovak, 55 as Not found out, 15 as Polish, 8 as Other, 7 as Russian, 3 as Czech, 2 as Italian, 1 as Irish and 1 as Austrian.

Note on population: The difference values of population numbers in the table "Population statistic" and in the sections "Ethnicity" & "Religion" is caused by the use of various statistical methods.

=== Religion ===
Census 2021 (1+ %)
Religion	Number	Fraction
Roman Catholic Church	1730	90.43%
None	106	5.54%
Not found out	49	2.56%
Total	1913	

In year 2021 was 1913 people by religion 1730 from Roman Catholic Church, 106 from None, 49 from Not found out, 17 from Evangelical Church, 4 from Greek Catholic Church, 1 from Calvinist Church, 1 from Other and not ascertained christian church, 1 from Christian Congregations in Slovakia, 1 from Islam, 1 from Hinduism, 1 from Seventh-day Adventist Church and 1 from Ad hoc movements.

== Genealogical resources ==
The records for genealogical research are available at the state archive "Statny Archiv in Bytca, Slovakia"

- Roman Catholic church records (births/marriages/deaths): 1770-1895 (parish A)

== Notable residents ==
- Irena Schusterová – First Lady of Slovakia (1999–2004), born in Bobrov

== See also ==
- List of municipalities and towns in Slovakia
