= Martina Kisková =

Slovak engineer

First Lady of Slovakia
- In role 15 June 2014 – 15 June 2019
- President: Andrej Kiska
- Preceded by: Silvia Gašparovičová
- Succeeded by: Juraj Rizman (As First Gentleman)

Personal details
- Born: Martina Živorová; 27 June 1975 (age 51) Banská Bystrica, Czechoslovakia
- Spouse: Andrej Kiska (m. 2003)
- Children: 3
- Education: Matej Bel University

Martina Kisková (née Živorová, born 27 June 1975) is a Slovak engineer, she was First Lady of Slovakia, and wife of President Andrej Kiska. Kisková, who became First Lady in 2014 at the age of 38, is the country's youngest first lady in its history.

== Biography ==
Kiskova was born in Banská Bystrica, present-day Slovakia. She was raised in Banská Bystrica's Rudlová neighborhood and later moved to Graniari Street with her parents. Kiskova attended Andreja Sládkoviča Gymnasium in Banská Bystrica and graduated from the Faculty of Economics at the Matej Bel University.

Martina Kisková is an engineer by profession. In addition to her native Slovak, Kisková speaks German, English, Russian and Spanish fluently.

In 2003, Kisková married Andrej Kiska. It was her first marriage and Kiska's second. The couple have three children, two sons and a daughter, namely Veronika (born 2004), Viktor (born 2009), and Martin who was born in July 2017 during their tenure as President and First Lady.

Kisková refrained from campaigning on behalf of her husband during the 2014 presidential election, arguing that she needed to protect their young children from the pressures of the campaign spotlight. She made her first official public appearance as at her husband's inauguration and inaugural parade on 15 June 2014, after remaining behind-the-scenes during the campaign.

Kisková has stated that the care and well-being of her children is her highest priority. She has noted that she and her husband are the first presidential couple in either Slovakia or the Czech Republic to serve in office while raising small children. Kisková explained the importance of her children in an interview before the 2014 election, "Given that none of the last Slovak or Czech presidents had small children, it is necessary to approach this situation with sensitivity and to realize that children need their mother." Her oldest two were 9 and 5 years old when the couple became President and First Lady in 2014. The couple's third child, Martin, was born in July 2017 while in office.

During the first month's of Kiska's presidency, Kisková announced that she would remain at their home in Poprad with their children, while President Kiska worked in Bratislava during the week. Kisková and the president's office also announced that she would only attending official events sporadically, in favor of raising with their children, and would refrain from most official travel engagements until they were older.

In addition to her role as First Lady, she heads a charitable organization called Dobrý anjel.
