= Irena Schusterová =

First Lady of Slovakia from 1999 until 2004

First Lady of Slovakia
- In role 25 June 1999 – 15 June 2004
- President: Rudolf Schuster
- Preceded by: Emília Kováčová
- Succeeded by: Silvia Gašparovičová

Personal details
- Born: Irena Trojáková; 12 November 1937 Bobrov, Czechoslovakia
- Died: 24 May 2008 (aged 70) Košice, Slovakia
- Spouse: Rudolf Schuster (1961–2008; her death)
- Children: Ingrid; Peter
- Occupation: Dietician

Irena Schusterová (12 November 1937 – 24 May 2008) was a Slovak dietician who served as First Lady of Slovakia from 1999 until 2004 during the presidency of her husband, Rudolf Schuster.

== Biography ==
Schusterová was born Irena Trojáková on 12 November 1937 in Bobrov, Czechoslovakia, to a peasant family. She graduated at the Secondary Medical School (Strednej zdravotnej škole) in Bratislava. Schusterová then worked as a dietician and dietary nurse for 33 years.

While studying in Bratislava, Irena Schusterová met her future husband, Rudolf Schuster, who was working as a scientist at the Slovak Academy of Sciences. The couple married in 1961. In 1962, they moved to the city of Košice in 1962, where they resided for much of their lives.

Schusterová accompanied her husband throughout his political career. For example, while Schuster served as the last Ambassador of Czechoslovakia to Canada from 1990 until 1992, Schusterová handled the diplomatic social duties expected of an ambassador's spouse.

Schusterová served as the second First Lady of Slovakia from 1999 until 2004 during her husband's presidency. During her tenure as first lady, she established the Irena Schusterová Foundation to assist children suffering from congenital heart defects. Her foundation raised more than 20 million korunas to fund a new pediatric heart clinic in Bratislava.

Irena Schusterová was admitted to the hospital on Thursday 22 May 2008, after feeling ill. She had been in relatively good health at the time. Two days later, Schusterová died from a sudden heart attack while in hospital at the East Slovak Institute of Cardiovascular and Vascular Disease in Košice on 24 May 2008. She was 70 years old. Schusterová was survived by her husband of 47 years, Rudolf Schuster, and their children, Ingrid, a heart disease specialist, and Peter.

The funeral mass for Schusterová, a lifelong devout Catholic, was held on 29 May 2008 at St Elisabeth Cathedral in Košice. She was buried in a family tomb in Rozália cemetery.
