= Grassalkovich Palace =

Residence of the president of Slovakia in Bratislava

- Grasalkovičov palác
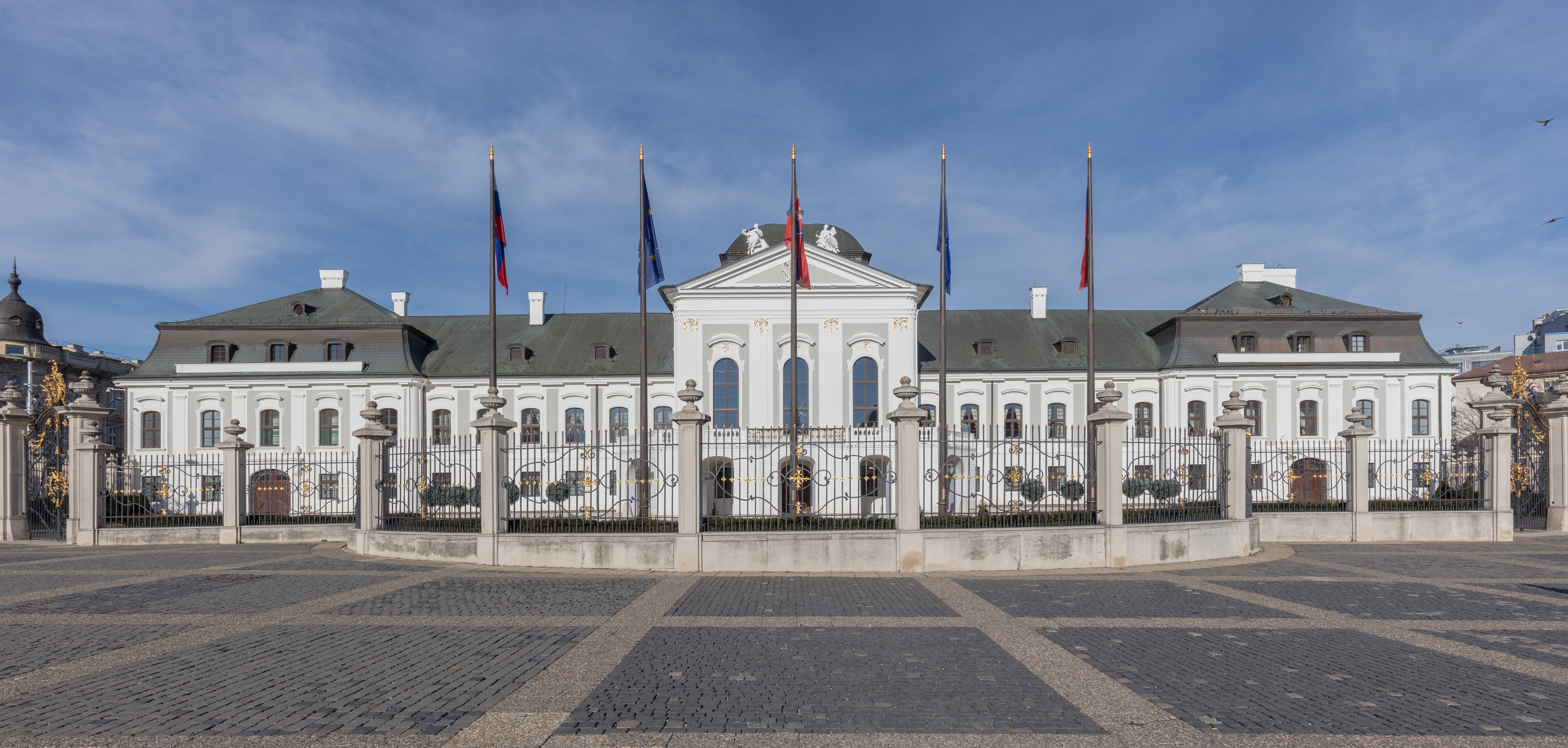
- Front side of the Palace

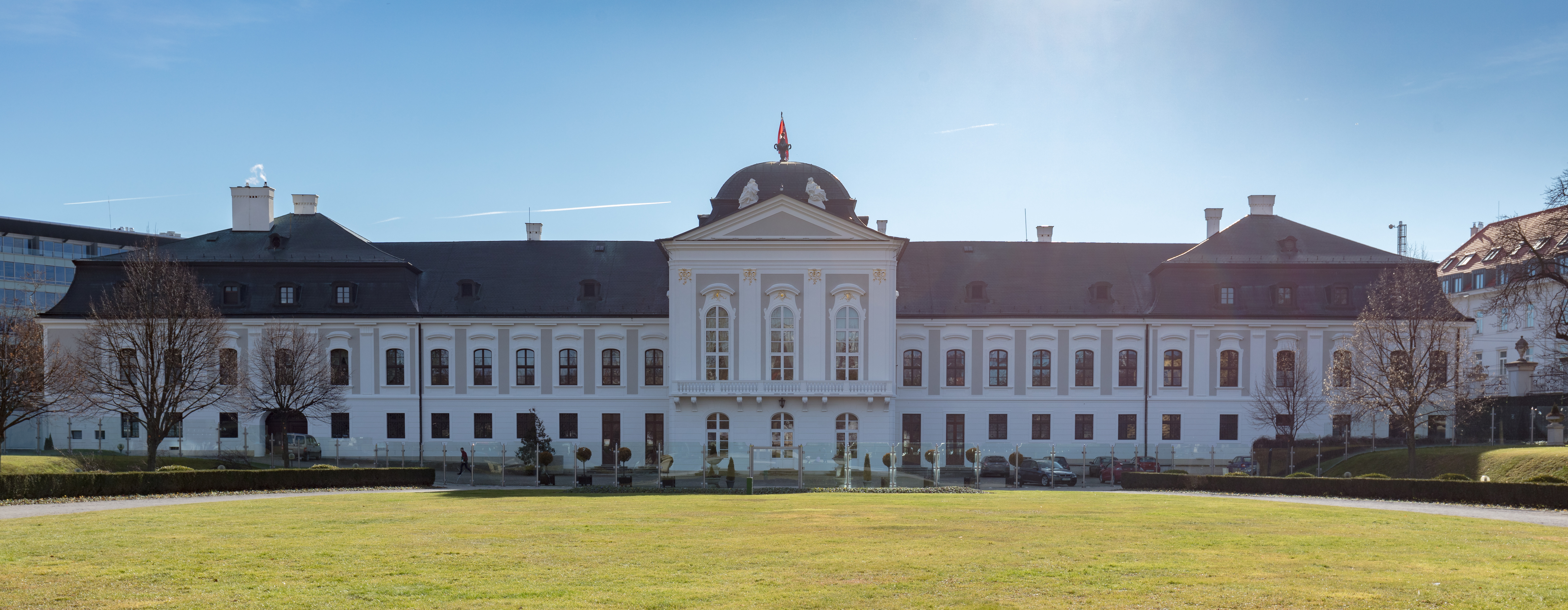
- Rear Facade of the Palace

General information
- Type: Palace
- Architectural style: Rococo
- Location: Old Town, Bratislava, Slovakia
- Coordinates: 48°08′57″N 17°06′28″E
- Current tenants: Peter Pellegrini, President of the Slovak Republic
- Completed: 1760; 266 years ago
- Client: Antal Grassalkovich
- Owner: Slovak Republic

Design and construction
- Architect: Andreas Mayerhoffer

The Grassalkovich Palace (Slovak: Grasalkovičov palác, Hungarian: Grassalkovich-palota) is a palace in Bratislava, Slovakia, and the residence of the President of Slovakia. It is situated on Hodžovo Square, near the Episcopal Summer Palace. The building is a Rococo (Late Baroque) summer palace with a French garden.

== History ==
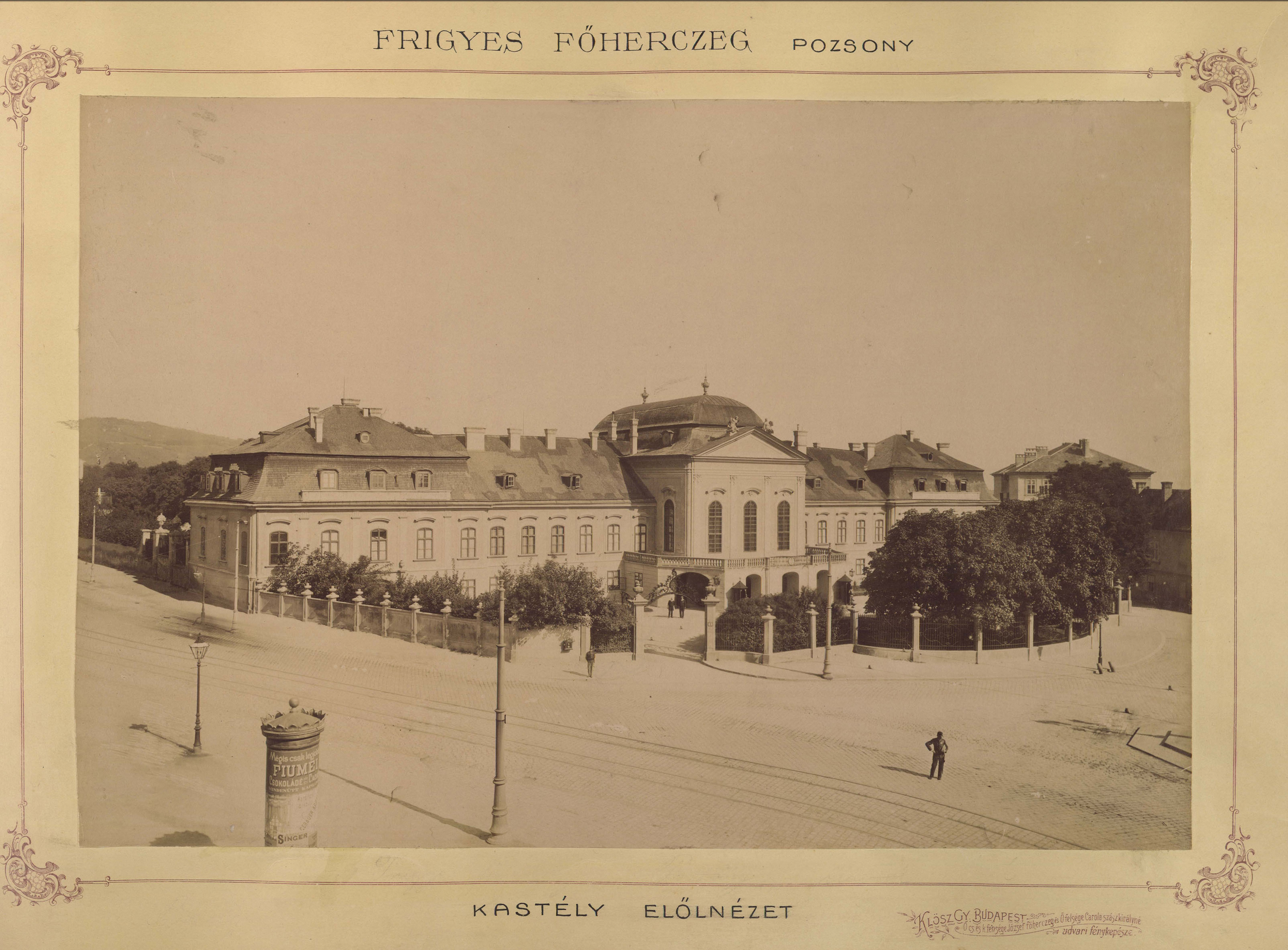
The Grassalkovich Palace c. 1900

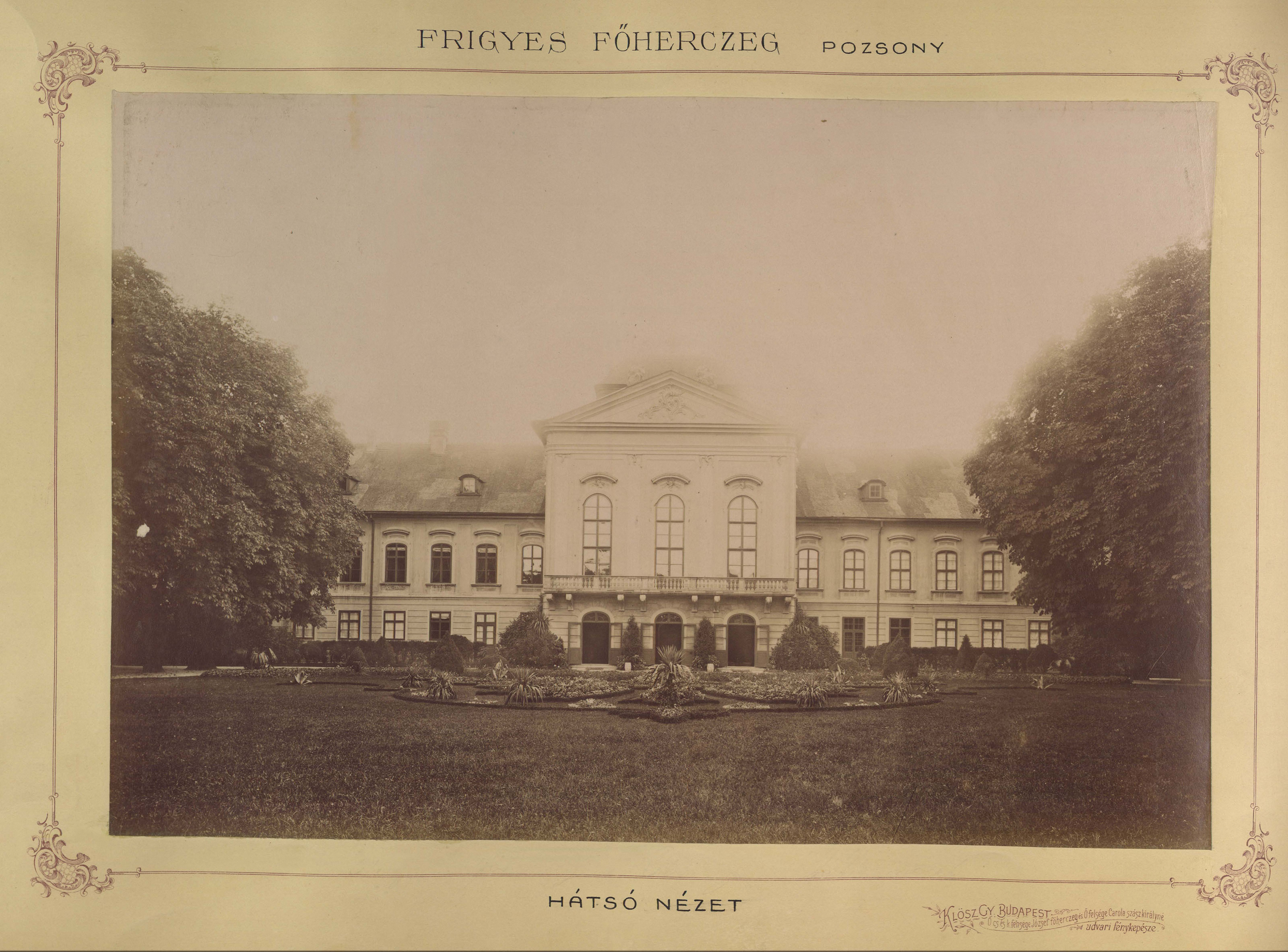
Back side of the Grassalkovich Palace c. 1900

The building was finished in 1760, by architect Andreas Mayerhoffer for Hungarian aristocrat Antal Grassalkovich of Croatian descent, a close friend of Maria Theresa. Antal was then President of the Royal Hungarian Chamber (quasi-Minister of Finance), and as such he needed an apartment in the capital (since Pressburg – now Bratislava – was the capital of Hungary until 1848). It features many rooms and an impressive staircase. The chapel is decorated with frescoes by Joseph von Pichler.

The building became a center of Baroque musical life in Pressburg. Joseph Haydn premiered some of his works here. Count Grassalkovich also had his orchestra and his "colleague", Prince Esterházy, used to "lend" him his favorite conductor, Haydn. Grassalkovich was Maria Theresa's vassal, so the palace was used for various balls and parties of the Habsburg royal court. For example, it was Haydn who conducted the orchestra when Maria Theresa's daughter married Albert of Sachsen-Teschen, then governor of the Kingdom of Hungary (see Bratislava Castle). Ľudovít Štúr is said to have declared his love to Adela Ostrolúcka for the first time during a ball organized by Archduke Stephen Francis Victor (Buda 14 September 1817 – Menton 19 February 1867), son of the Palatine, Joseph. The last owners of the palace before the end of Austria-Hungary were Archduke Frederick of Teschen with his wife Isabella of Croy-Dülmen. After that, the building stood empty for years. After the Treaty of Trianon, it was first used again as the personal residence of the dictator Jozef Tiso, leader of the Slovak Republic, but from 1919 the palace was occupied by the Territorial Military Command.

During the 1939–1945 period, the palace was adapted by Emil Belluš and became the seat of the President of the First Slovak Republic (i.e. of Jozef Tiso). During the Communist era, it was first (after 1945) the seat of the Board of Commissioners (also styled Corps of Plenipotentiaries), which was a quasi-government of Slovakia within Czechoslovakia. In 1950, the building was turned into the "Klement Gottwald House of Pioneers and Youth" (Dom pionierov a mládeže Klementa Gottwalda), which was an activity center for Bratislava's schoolchildren, all of whom were so-called pioneers at that time. The schoolchildren caused extensive damage to the palace, and the necessary restoration only became possible following the transition from Communism in late 1989 with the Velvet Revolution.

The restoration of Grassalkovich Palace during the early 1990s was overseen by the inaugural First Lady of Slovakia, Emília Kováčová. Following its restoration, the palace became the residence of Slovakia's president on 30 September 1996. Its once-large gardens are now a public park, complete with a statue of Bratislava-born composer Jan Nepomuk Hummel.

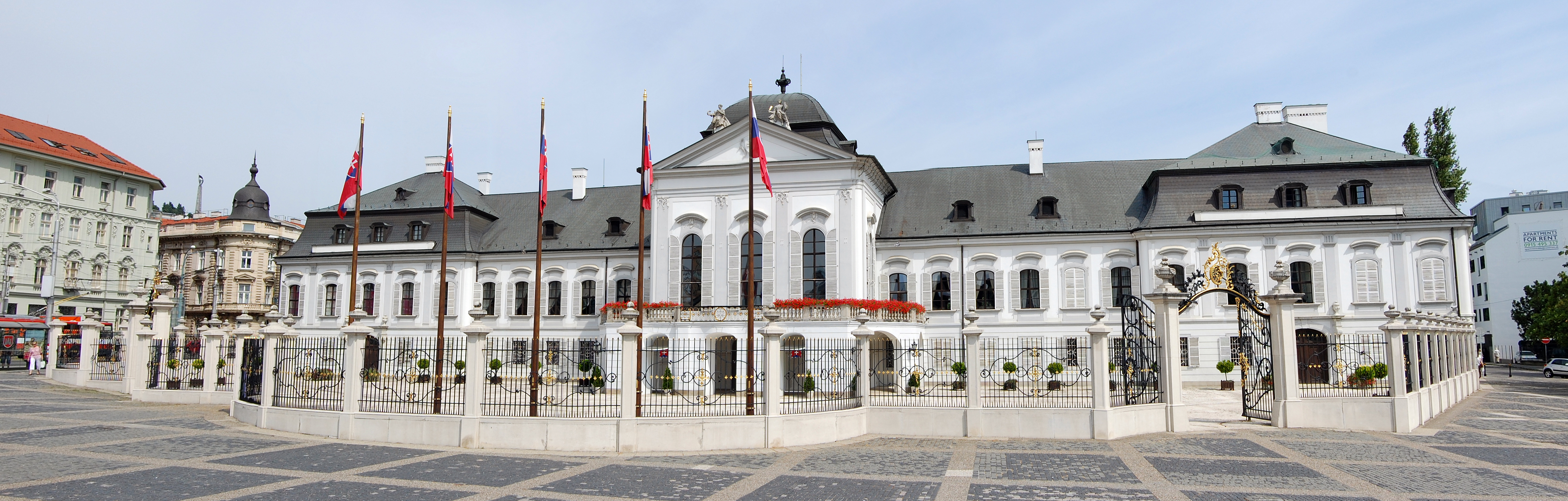
The Grassalkovich Palace

== Layout and amenities ==
The palace is entered via the main staircase, located behind the entrance hall. The staircase features two putti and four Baroque sculptures, which are an allegory of the four seasons attributed to Johann Wilhelm Beyer. On the first floor is the Great Hall with stucco decoration on the walls and tall mirrors between the windows. In the Great Hall, state or official visitors register in the Grassalkovich Palace guestbook. The Great Hall is also used for press briefings with the president.

In the center of the West wing is the president's office. Next to it is the Brown Salon (Presidential Library). It is directly adjacent to the Audience Room, where most of the president's meetings with visitors take place. The hall contains portraits of the ruler of the Austrian Habsburg monarchy Charles VI, his wife Elizabeth Christina and their children.

The Great Hall is connected with the Green Salon (Great Dining Room) in the East wing, which serves as a conference room or banquet room. The Golden Salon (Ladies' Salon) is located right next to it, here the president conducts private talks with state or official visitor and exchanges diplomatic gifts. It was named after the Baroque gilded wallpaper.

Another room is the oval Blue Salon, which serves as the First Lady's office. The salon is decorated with a preserved chandelier from the 19th century. On the ground floor, under the president's office, is the Small Dining Room, a vaulted room with a view of the park.

The Chapel of St. Barbara in the West wing of Grassalkovich palace was built as a separate building. It was consecrated in 1769.

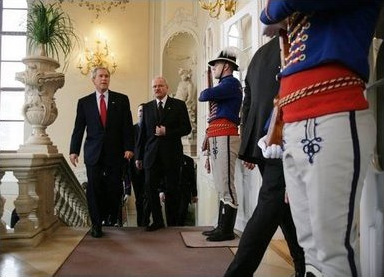
President Ivan Gašparovič with George W. Bush at the main staircase of the Palace

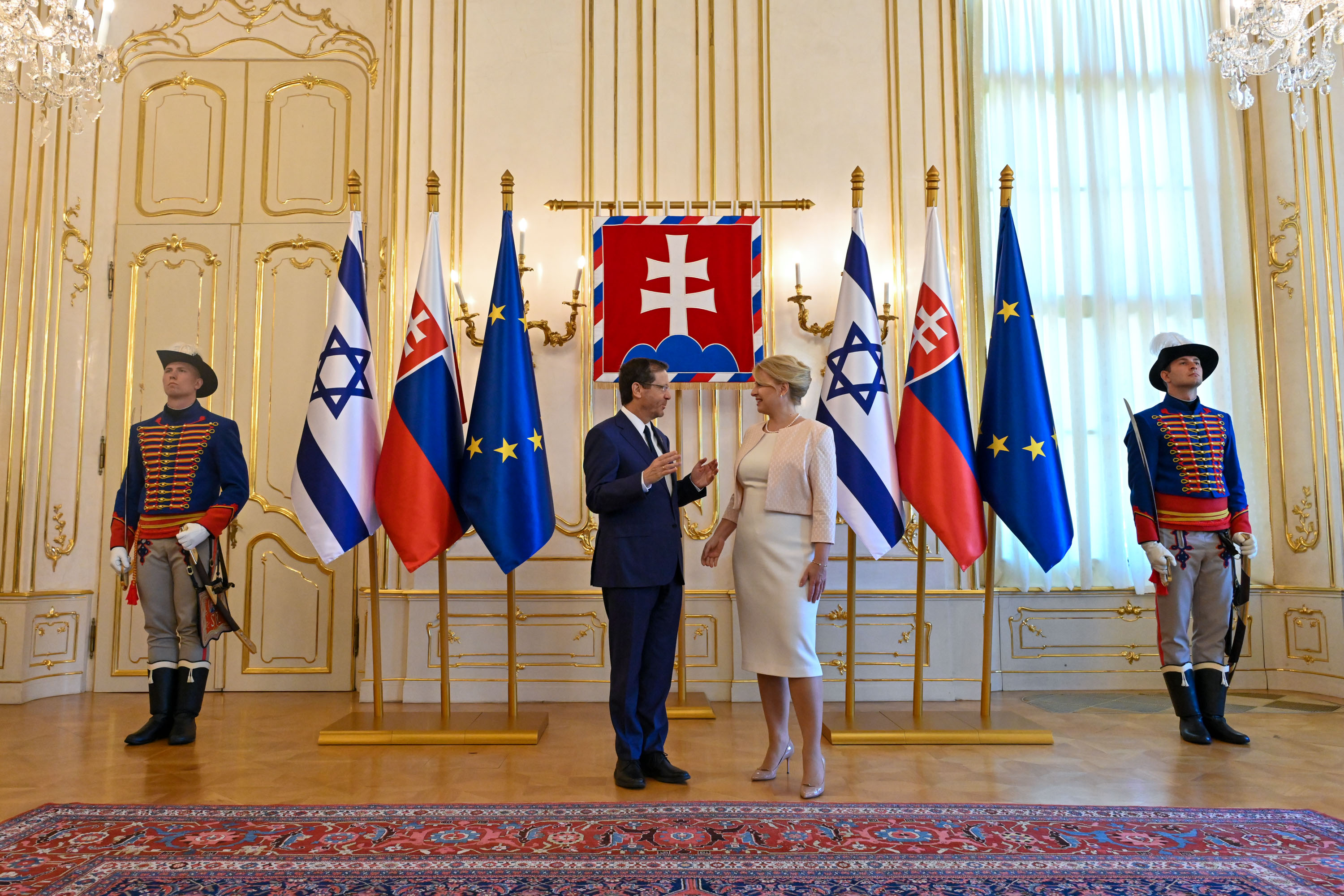
President Zuzana Čaputová with Isaac Herzog in the Great Hall

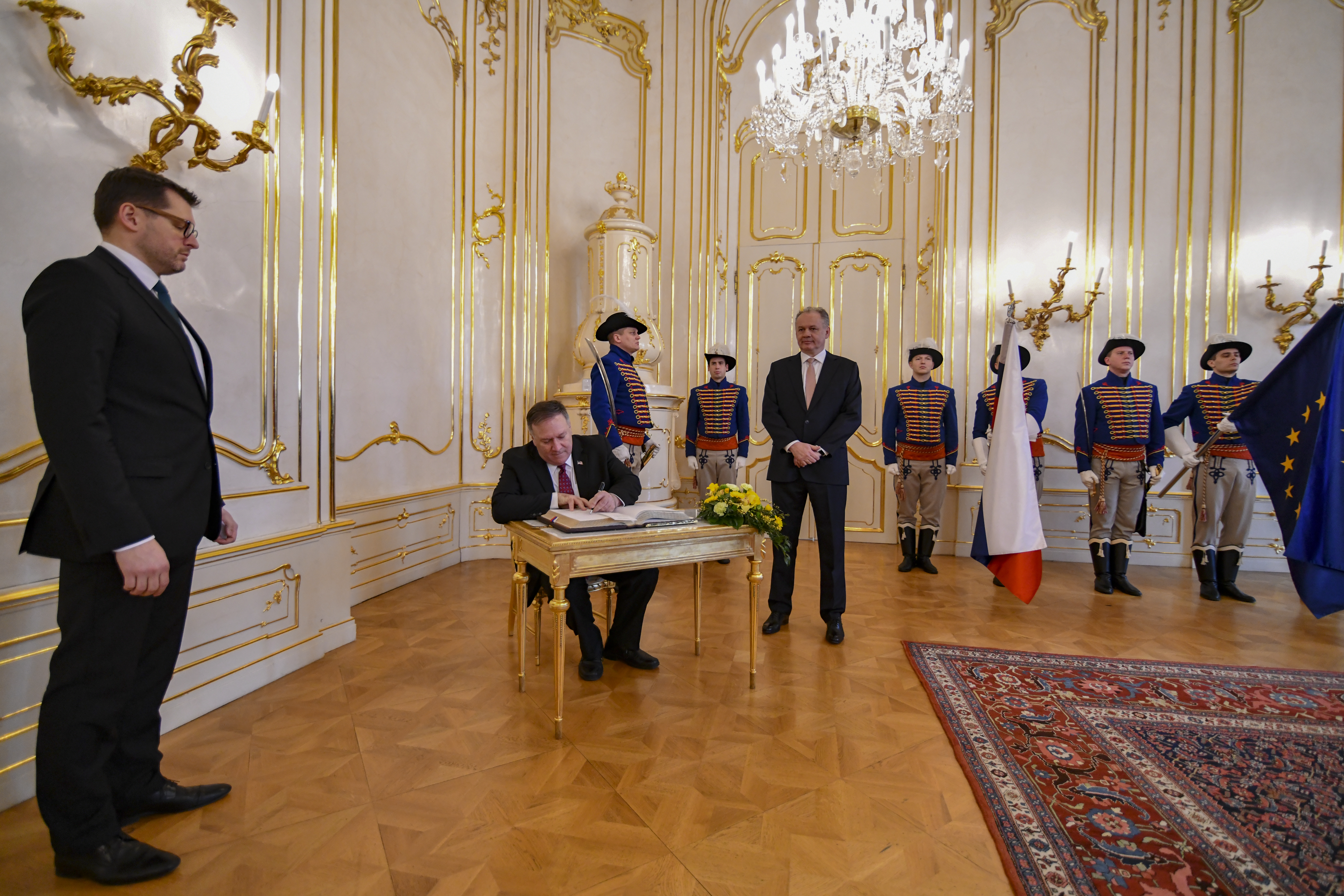
Mike Pompeo register in the Grassalkovich Palace guestbook in the Great Hall

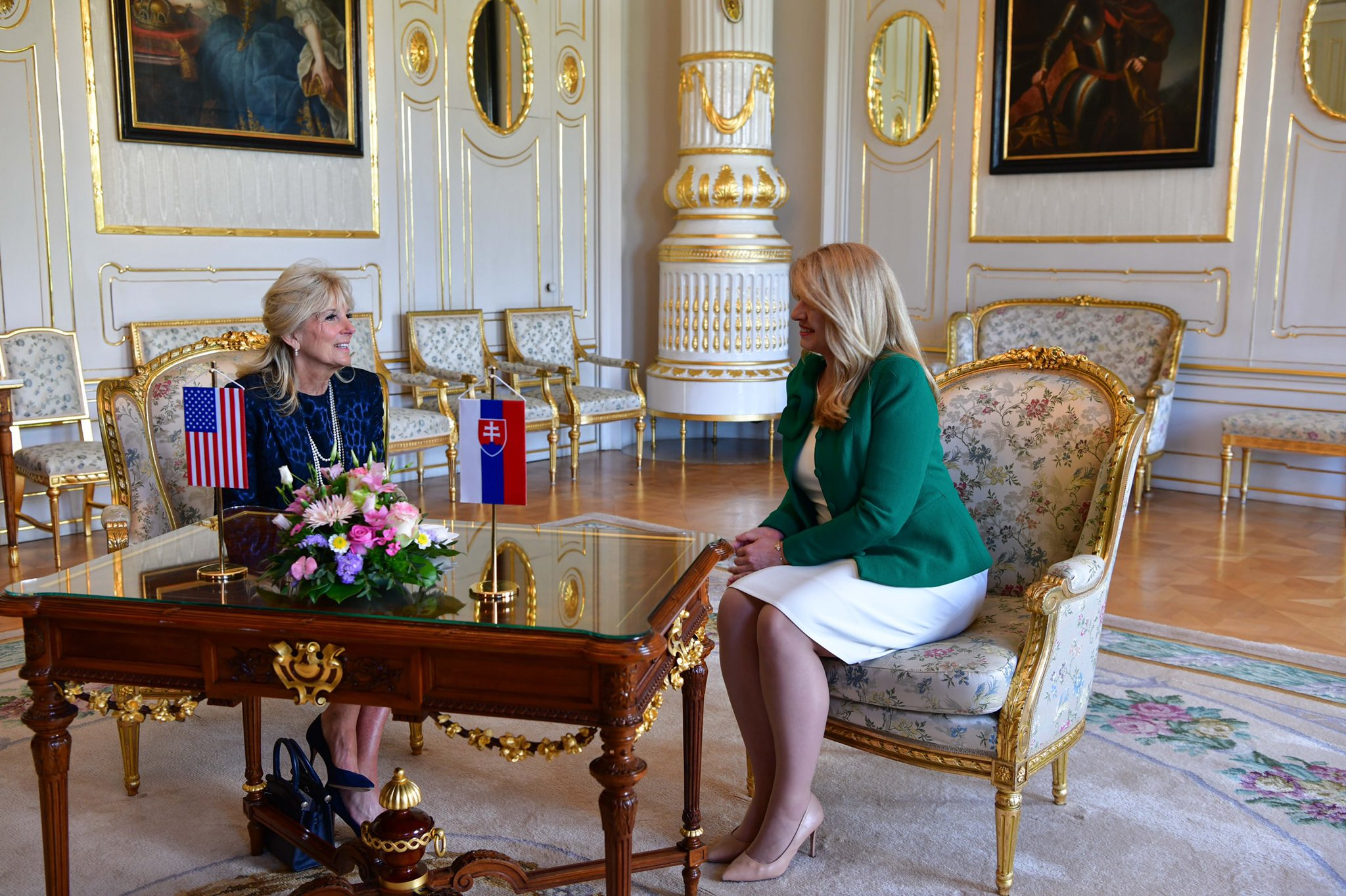
President Zuzana Čaputová with Jill Biden in the Audience Room

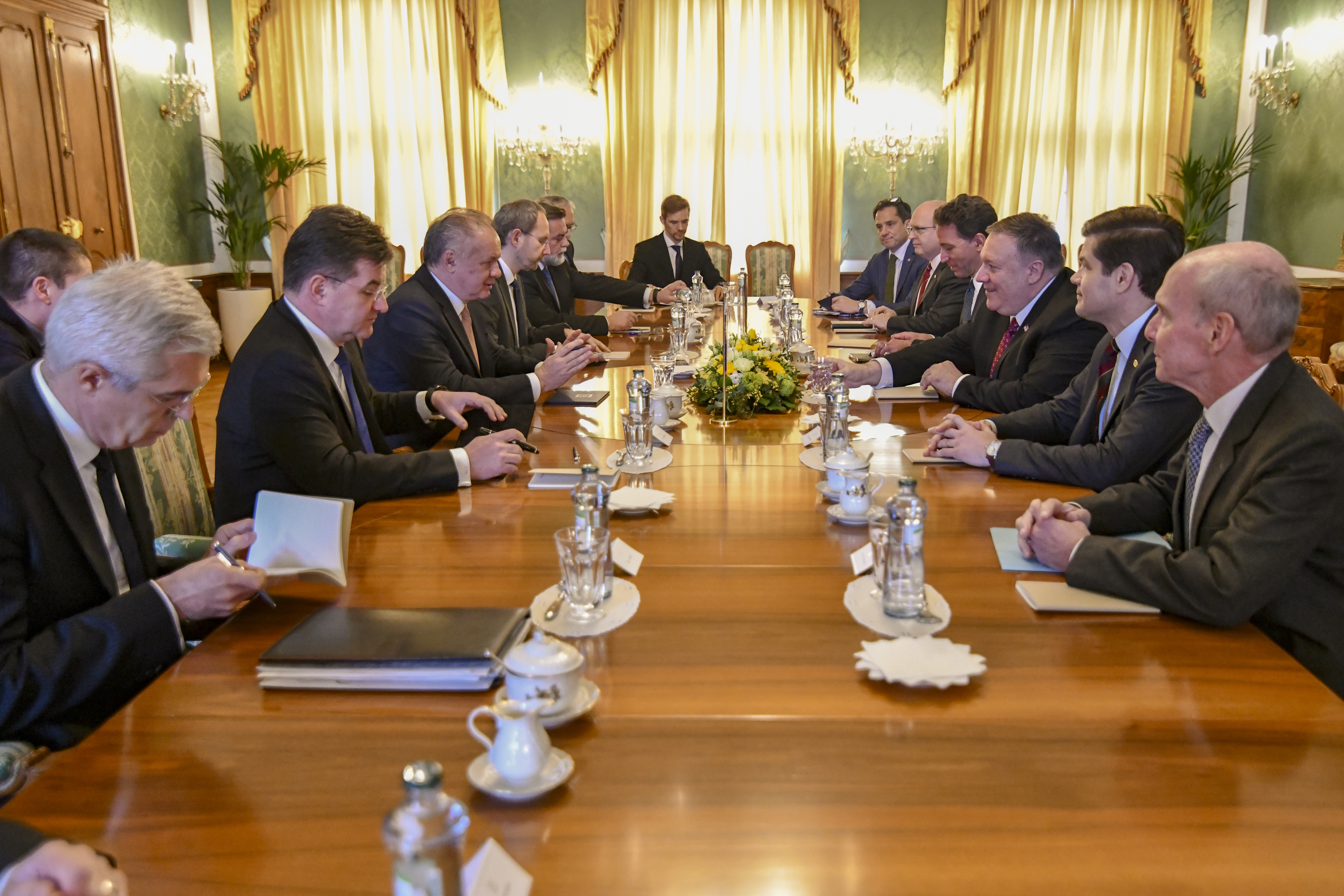
Slovak and U.S. Officials talk in the Green Salon

== Image gallery ==
=== Exterior ===
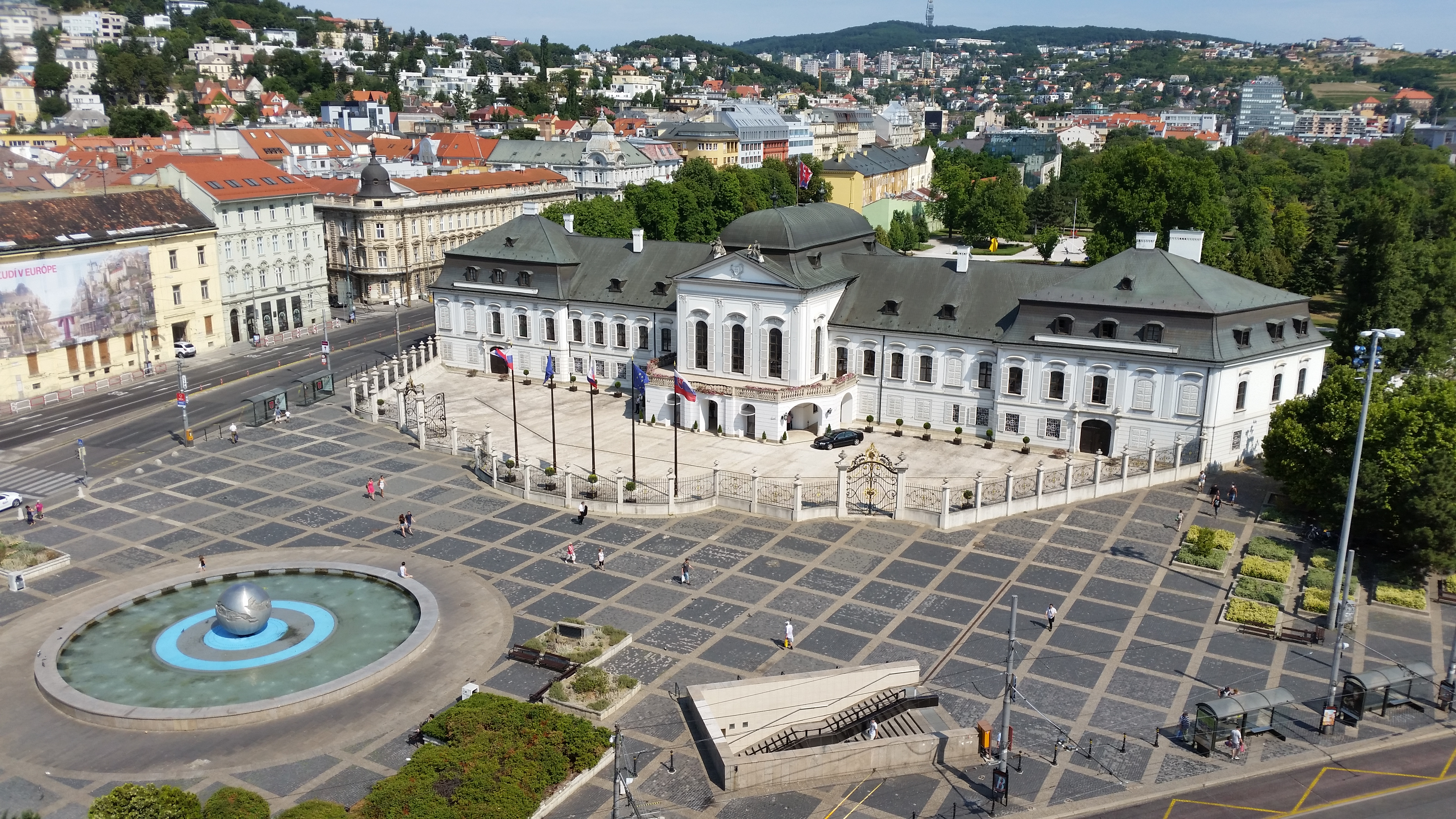
The Grassalkovich Palace and Hodžovo Square

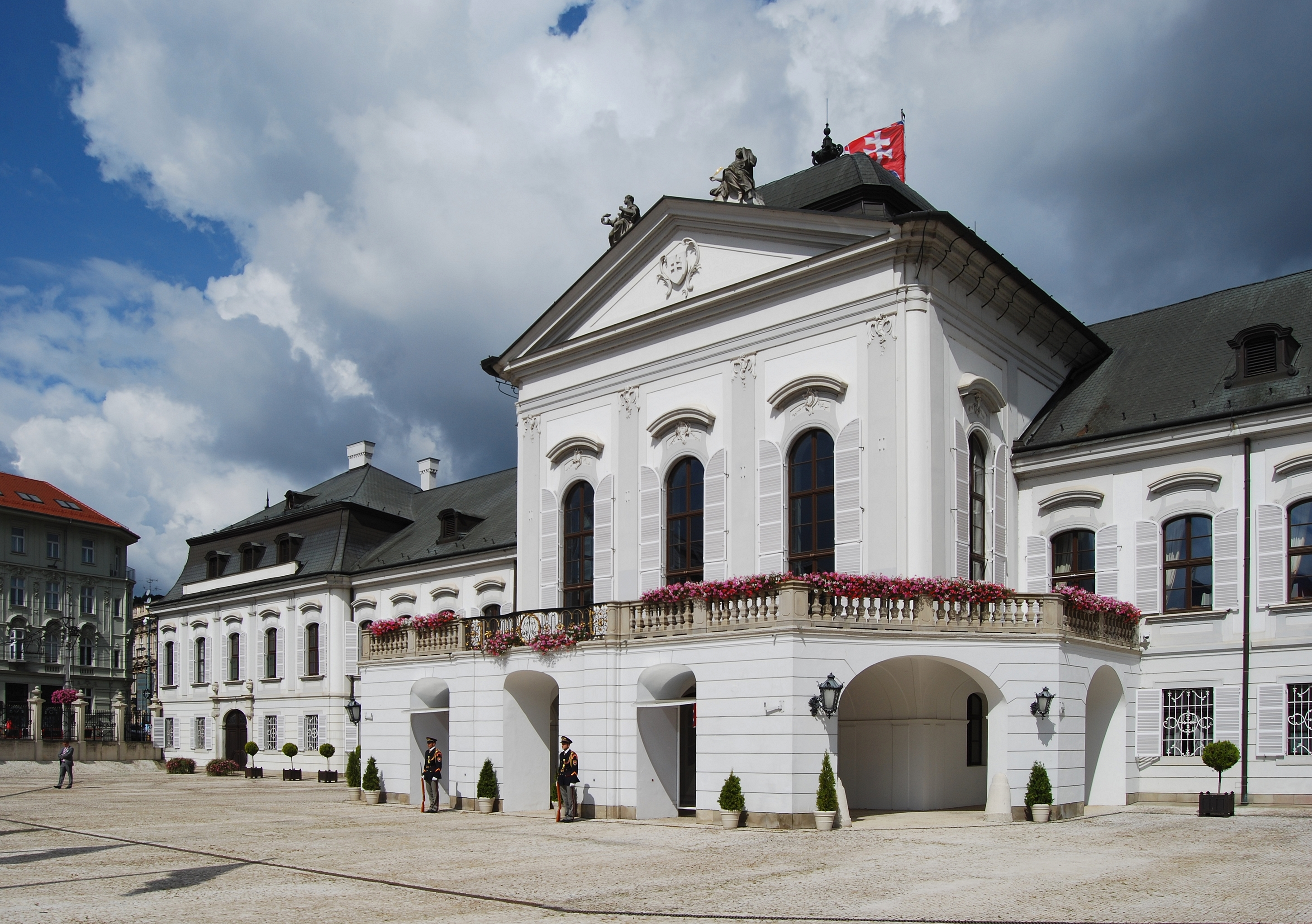
Guards in front of the Grassalkovich Palace

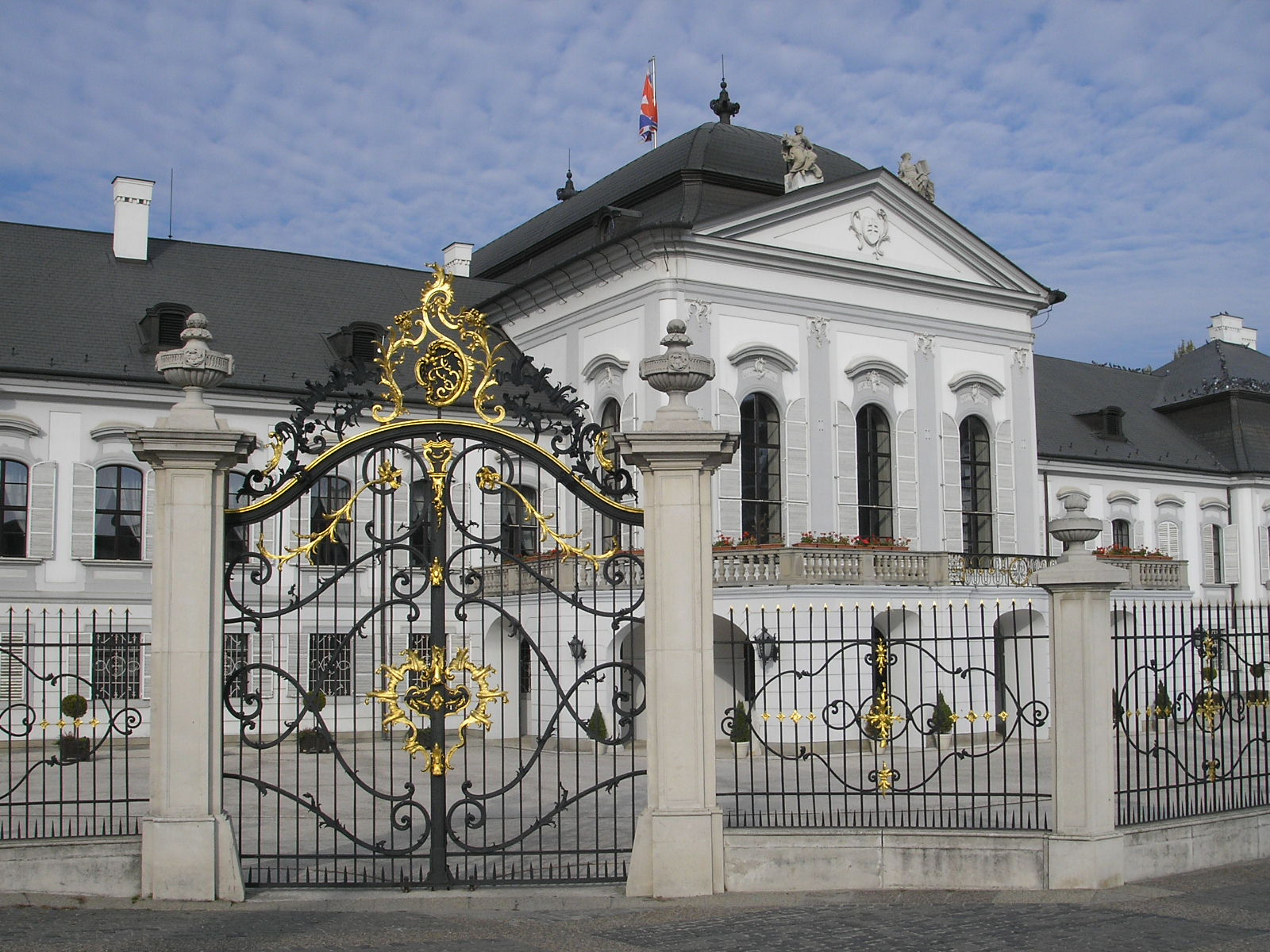
One of the two main gates

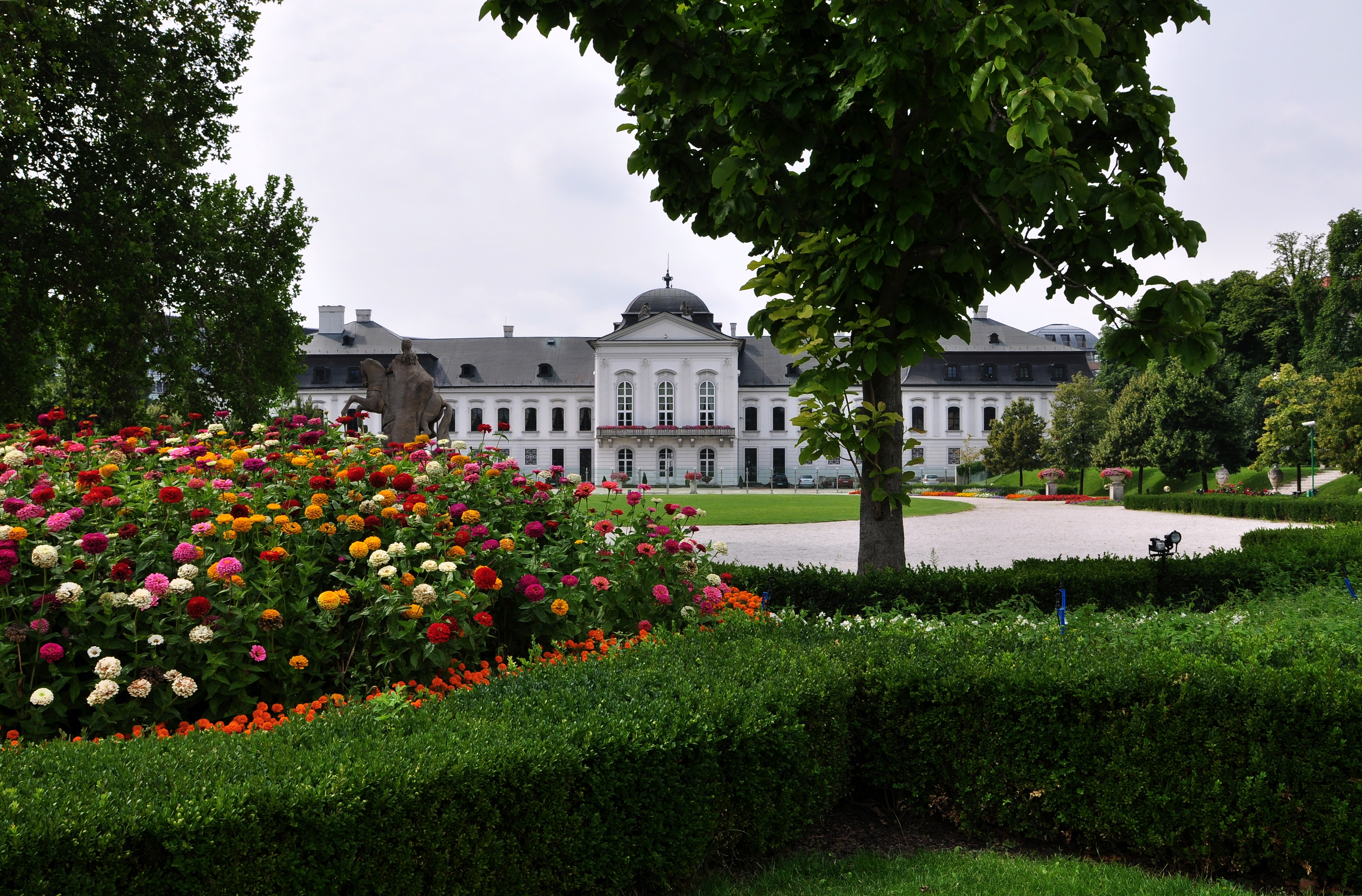
Presidential Garden behind the Palace

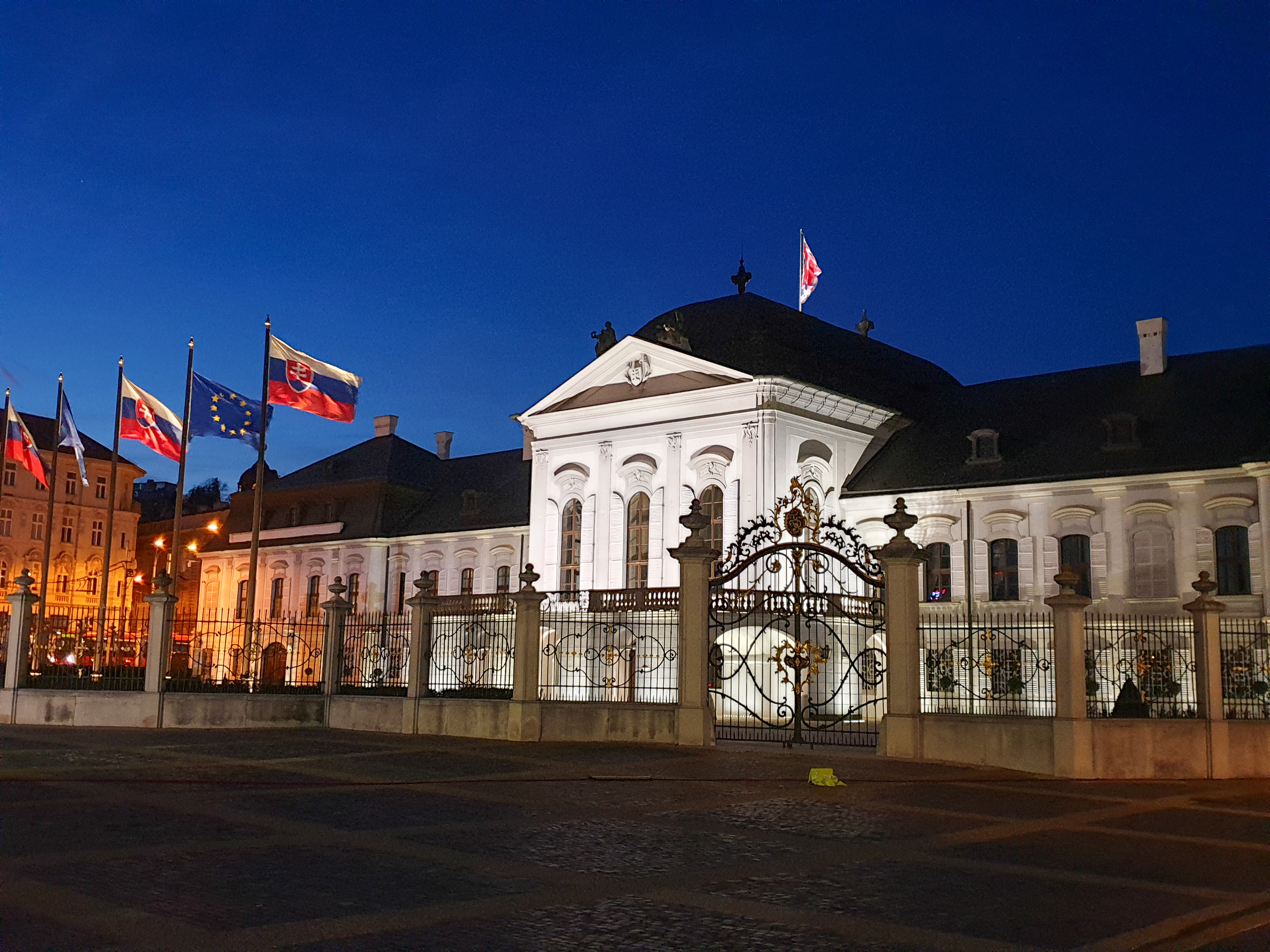
The Grassalkovich Palace at night

=== Interior ===
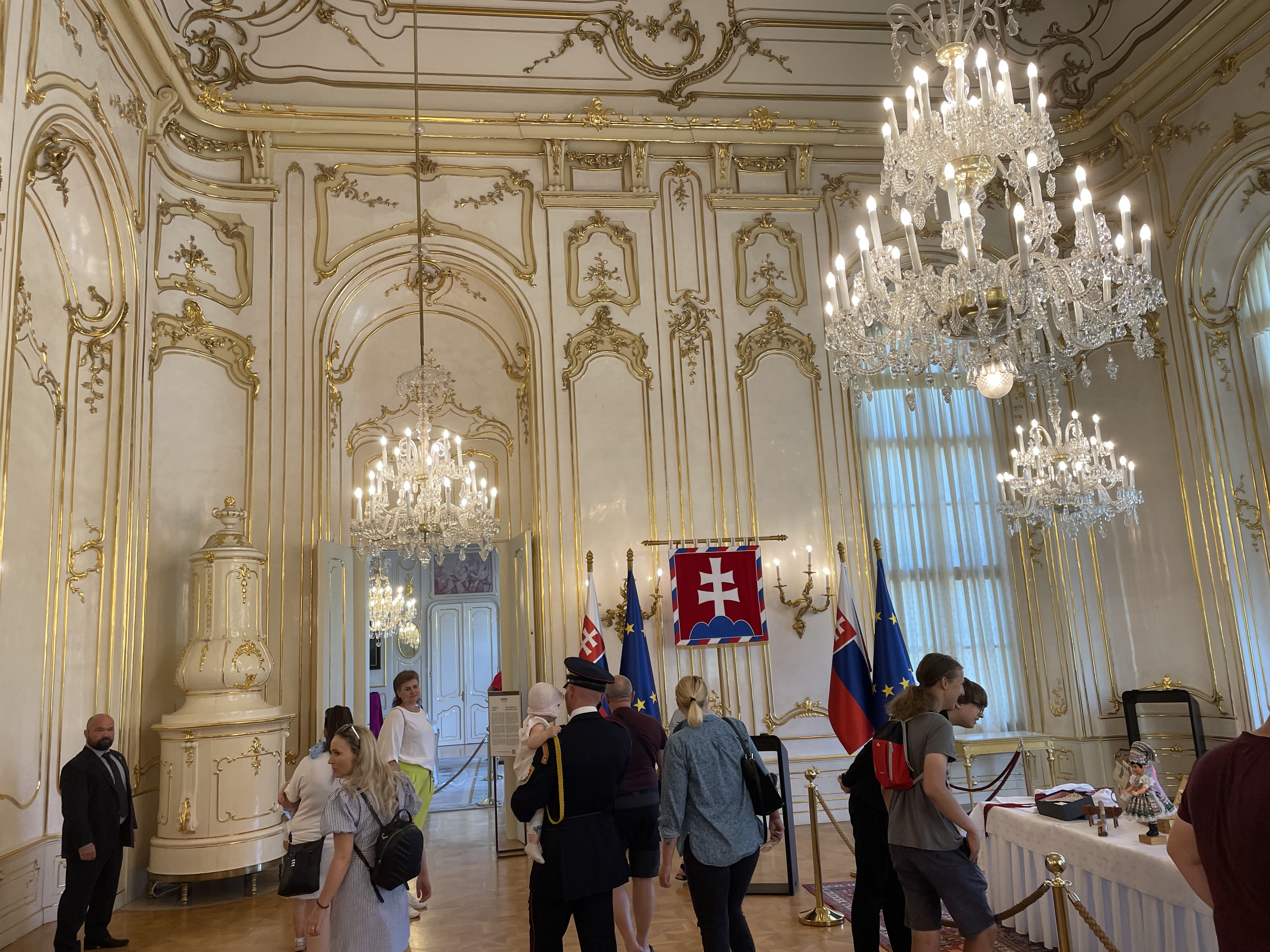
The Great Hall

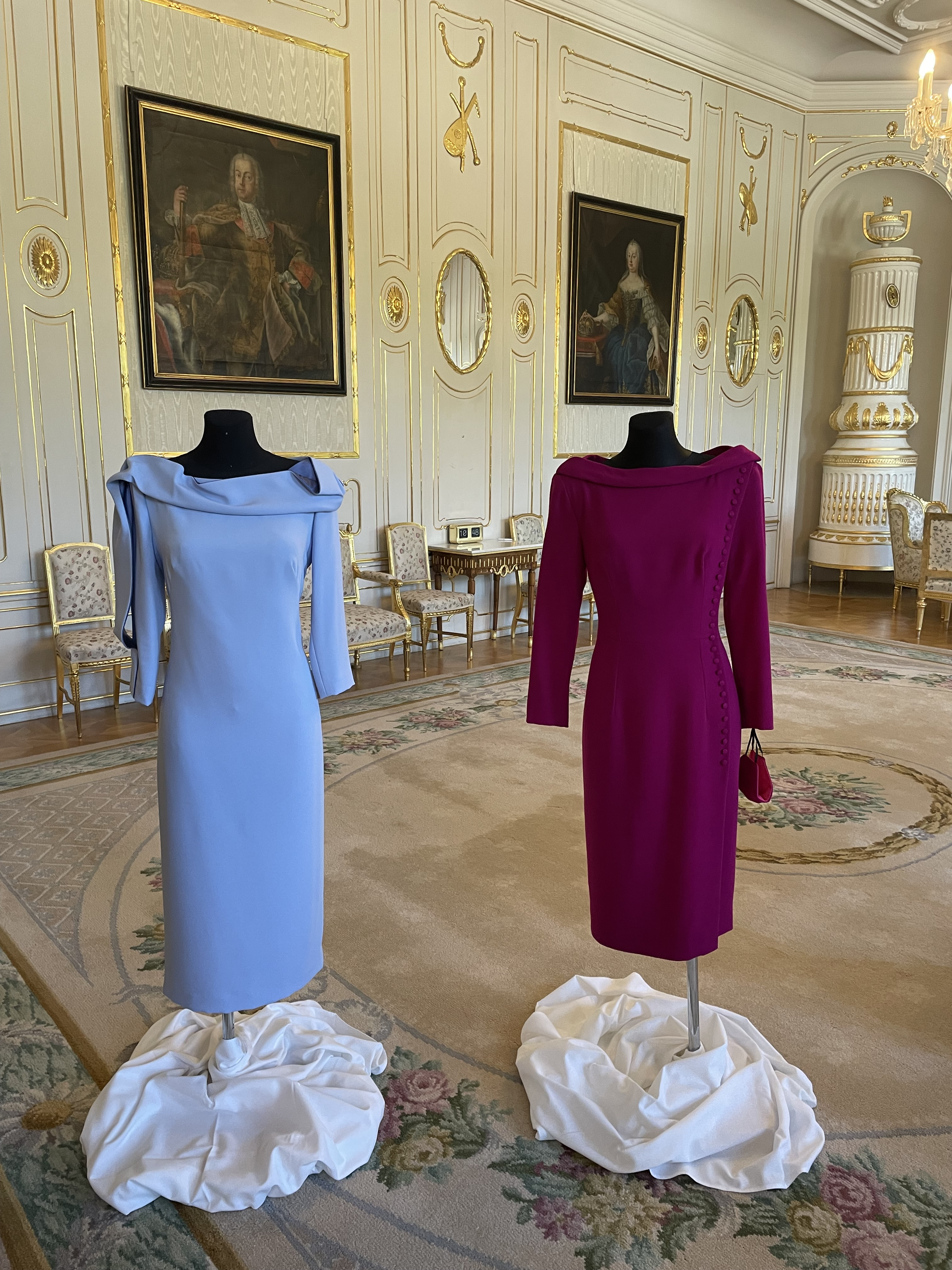
The Audience Room with portraits of Charles VI, his wife Elizabeth Christina

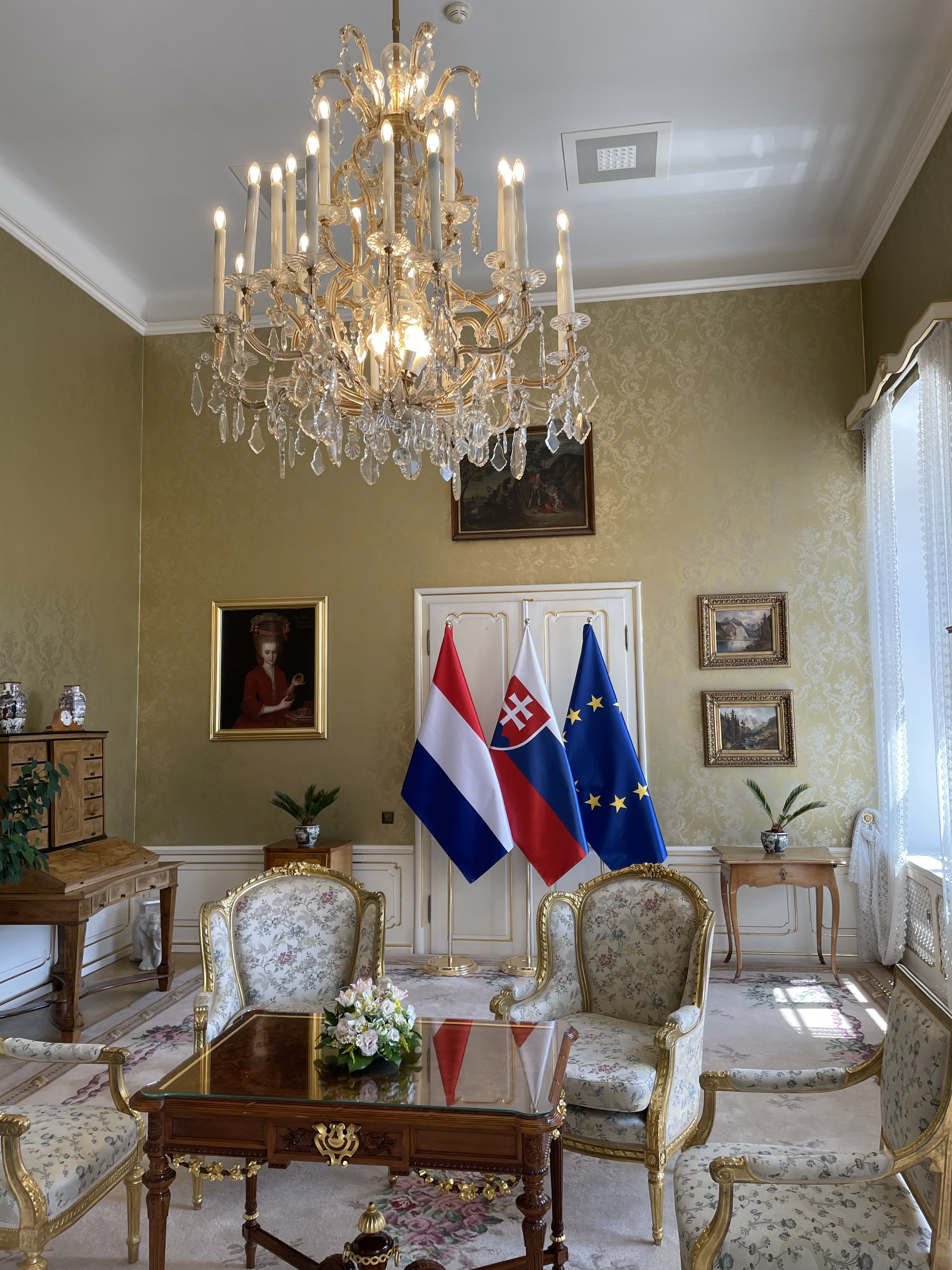
The Golden Salon

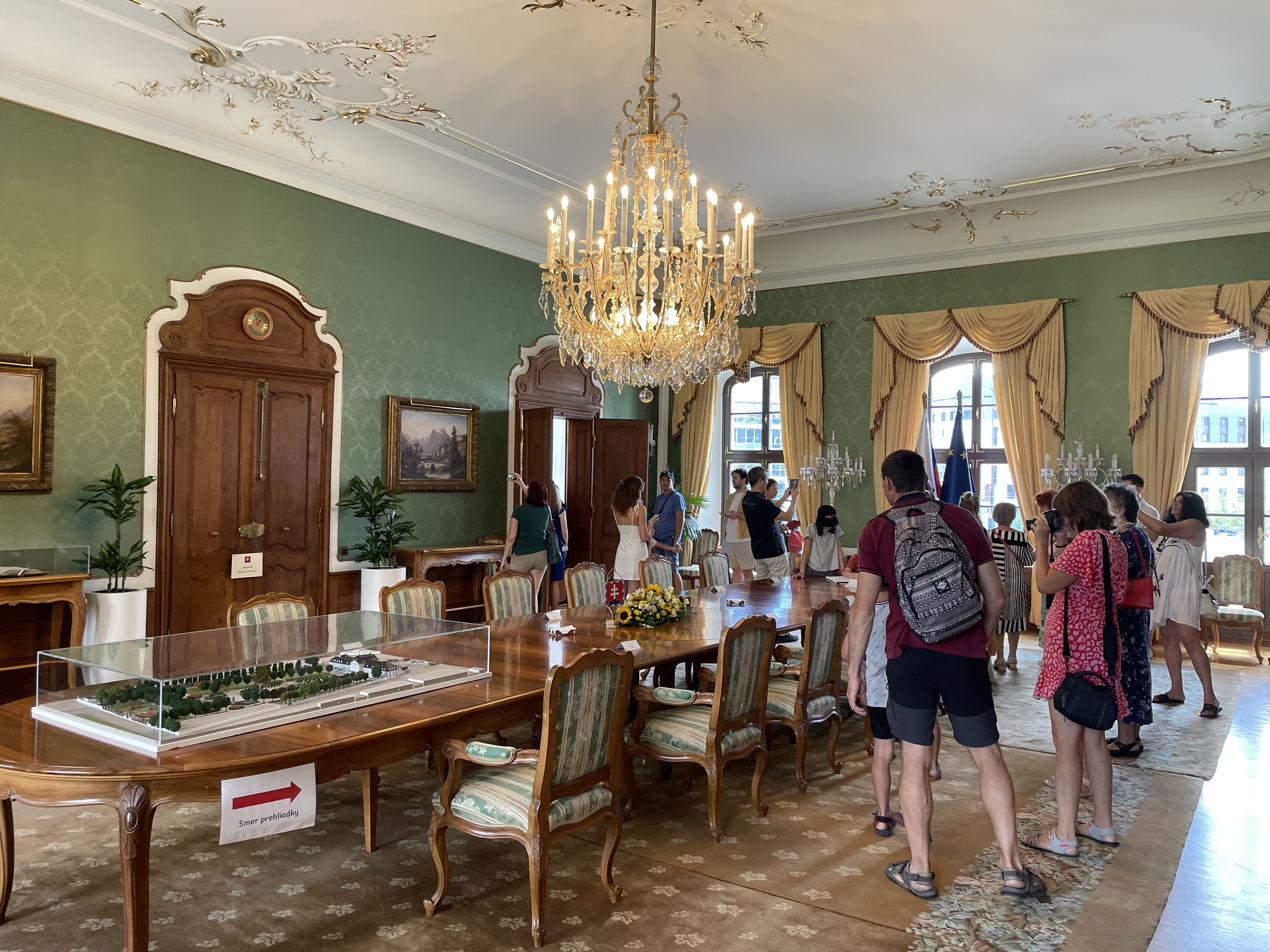
The Green Salon, conference or banquet room

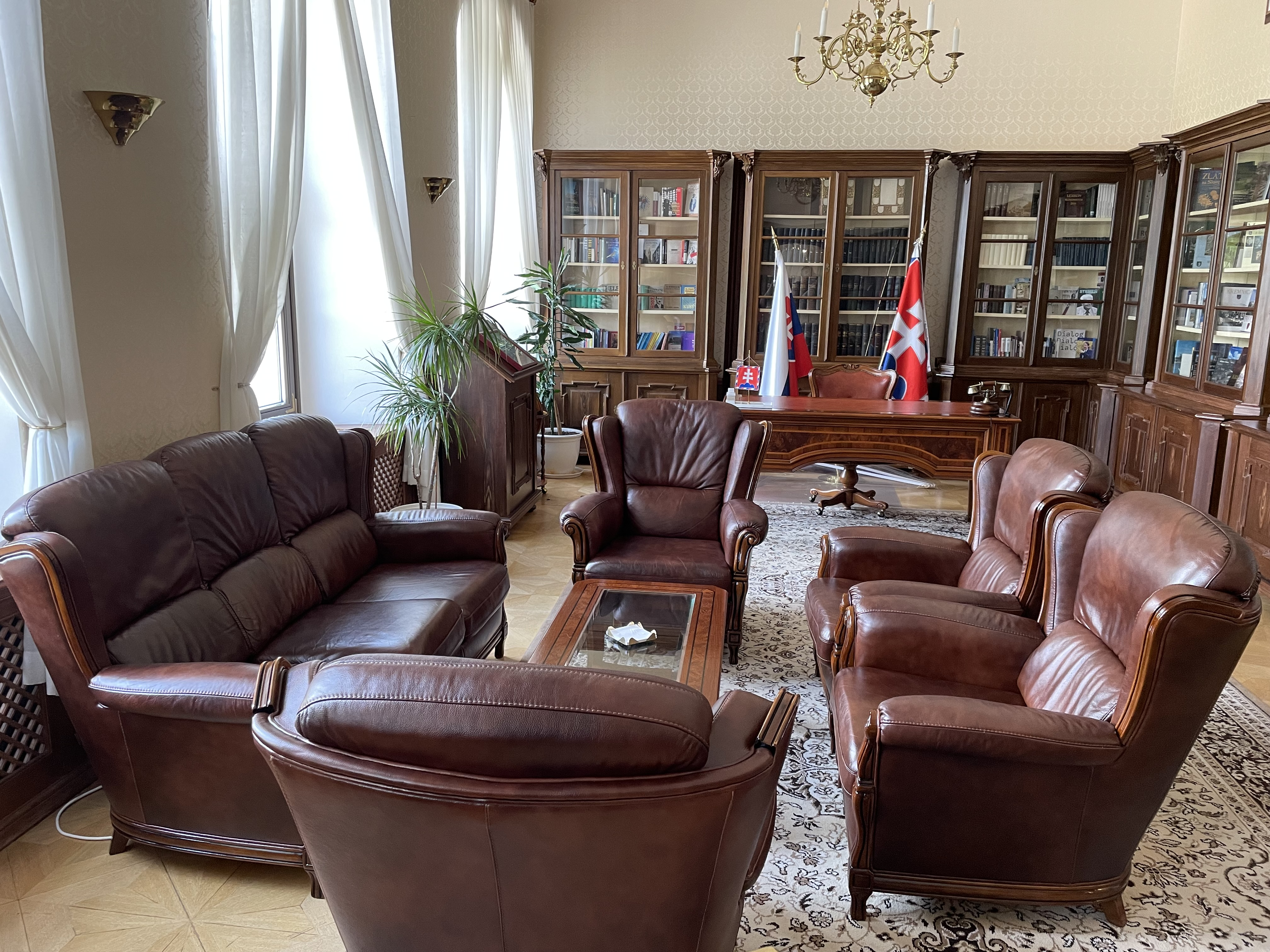
The Brown Salon, Presidential library

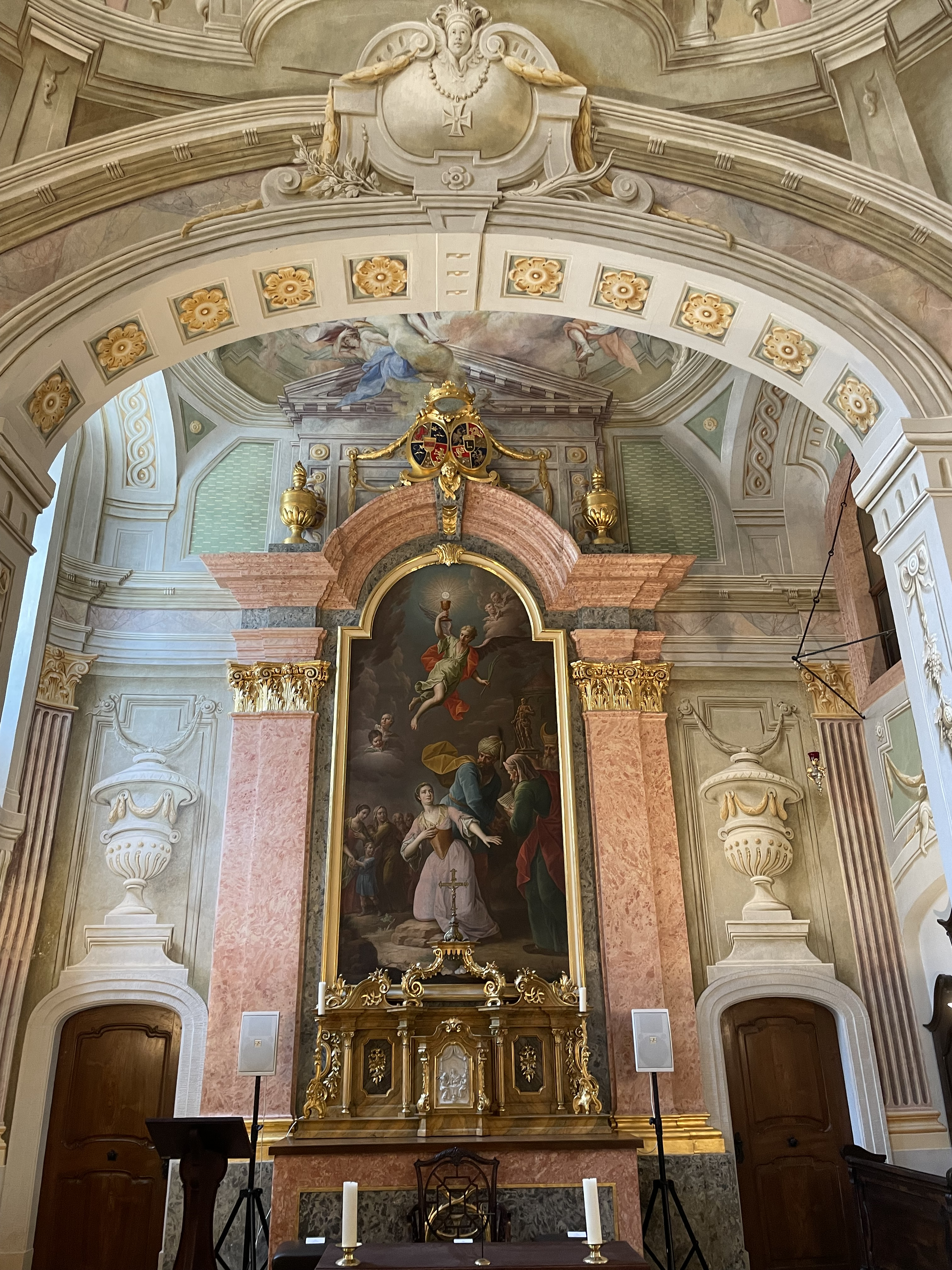
The Chapel of St. Barbara in the West wing

=== Statues ===
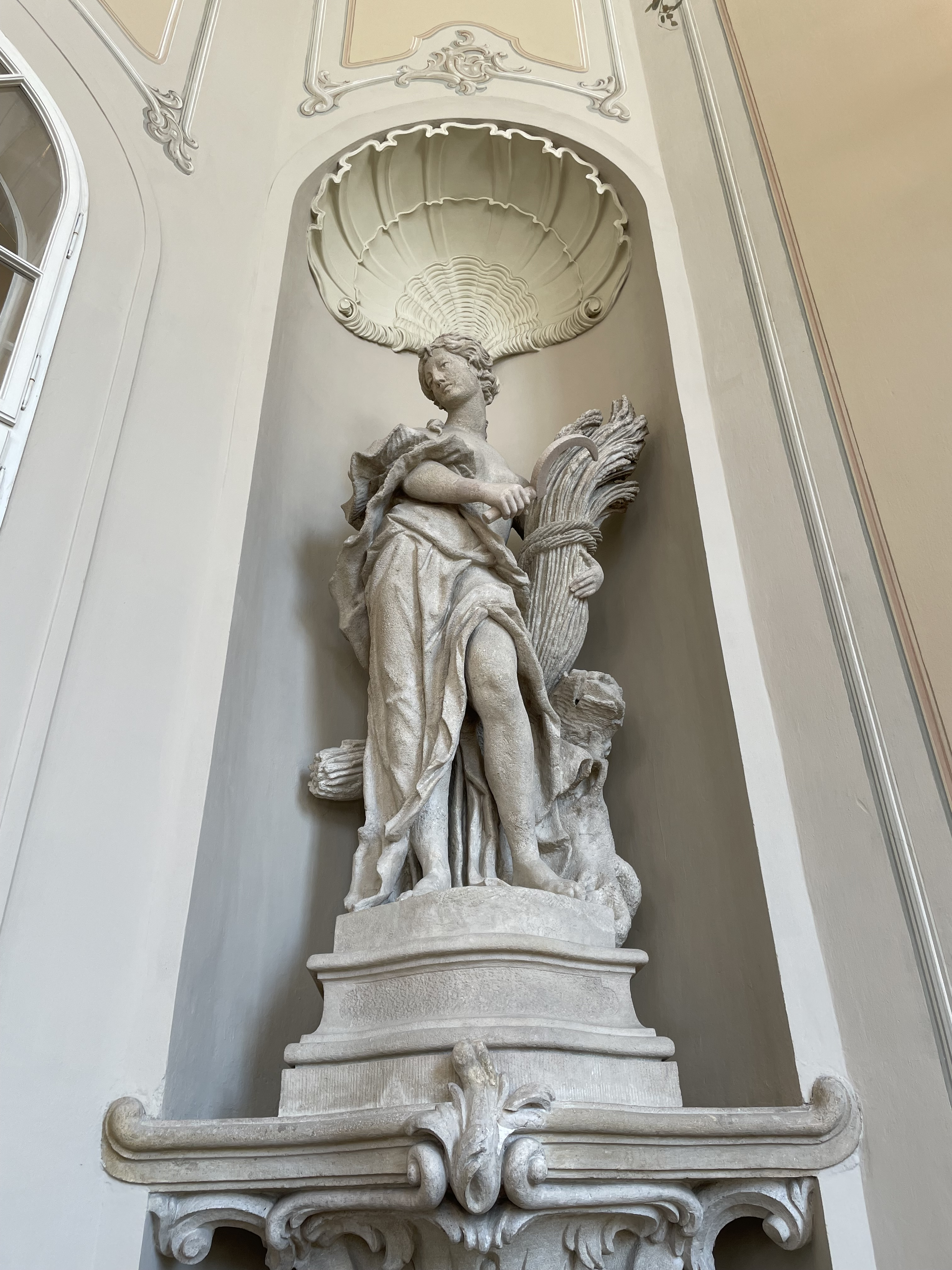
First of four Baroque sculptures in the main staircase of the Palace

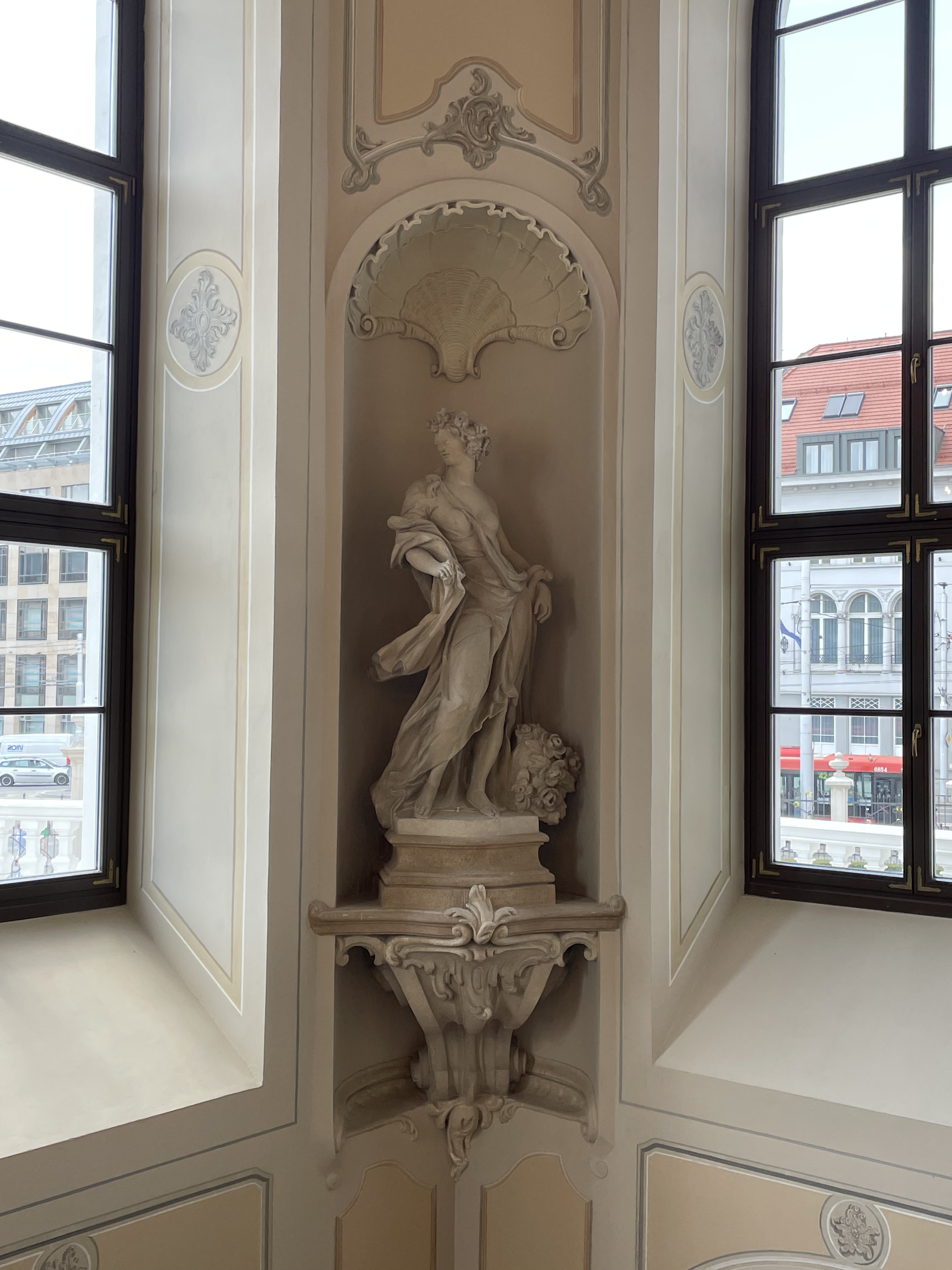
Second sculpture in the main staircase of the Palace

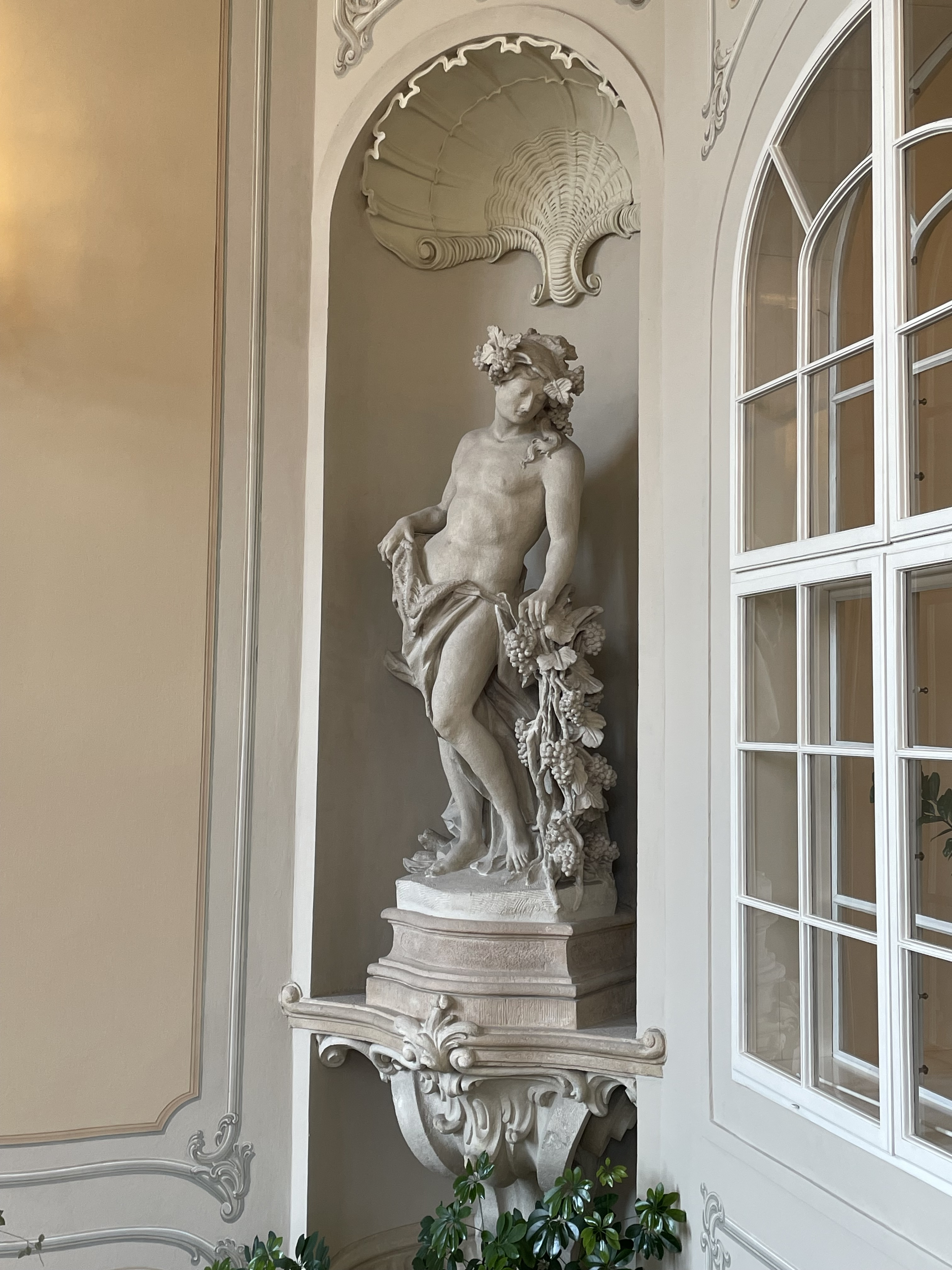
Third sculpture in the main staircase of the Palace

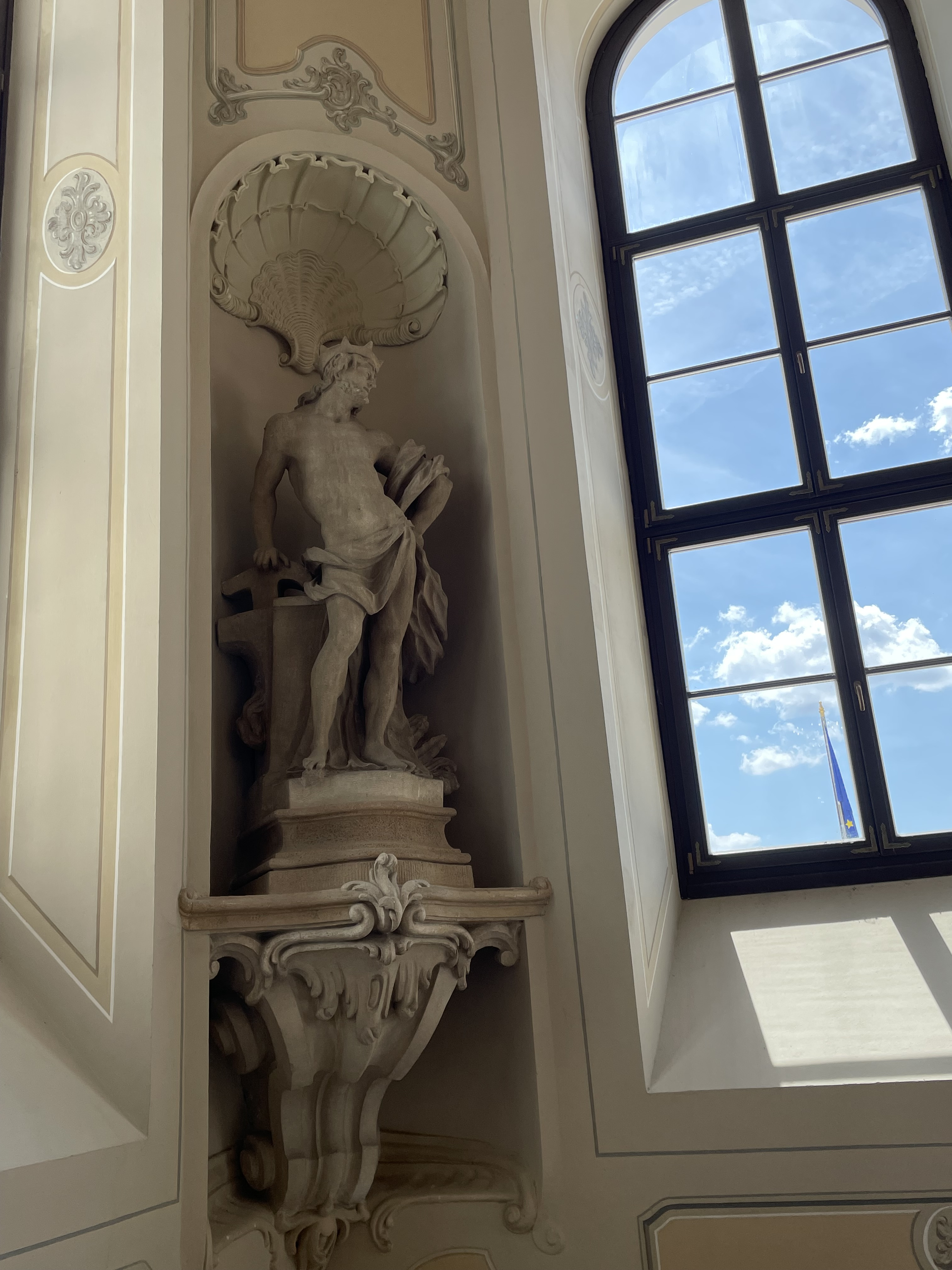
Fourth sculpture in the main staircase of the Palace

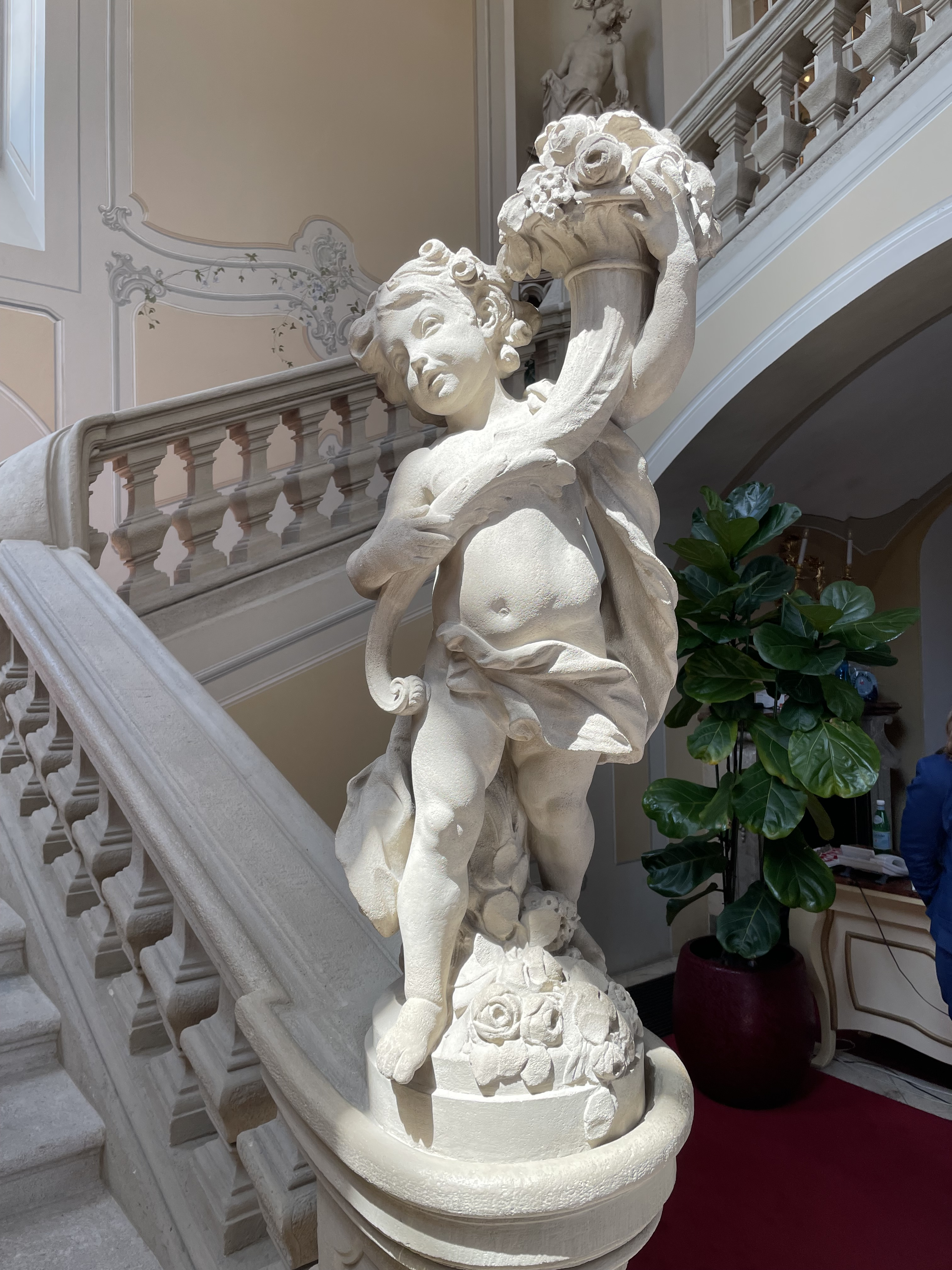
One of the two putti (left) in the main staircase of the Palace

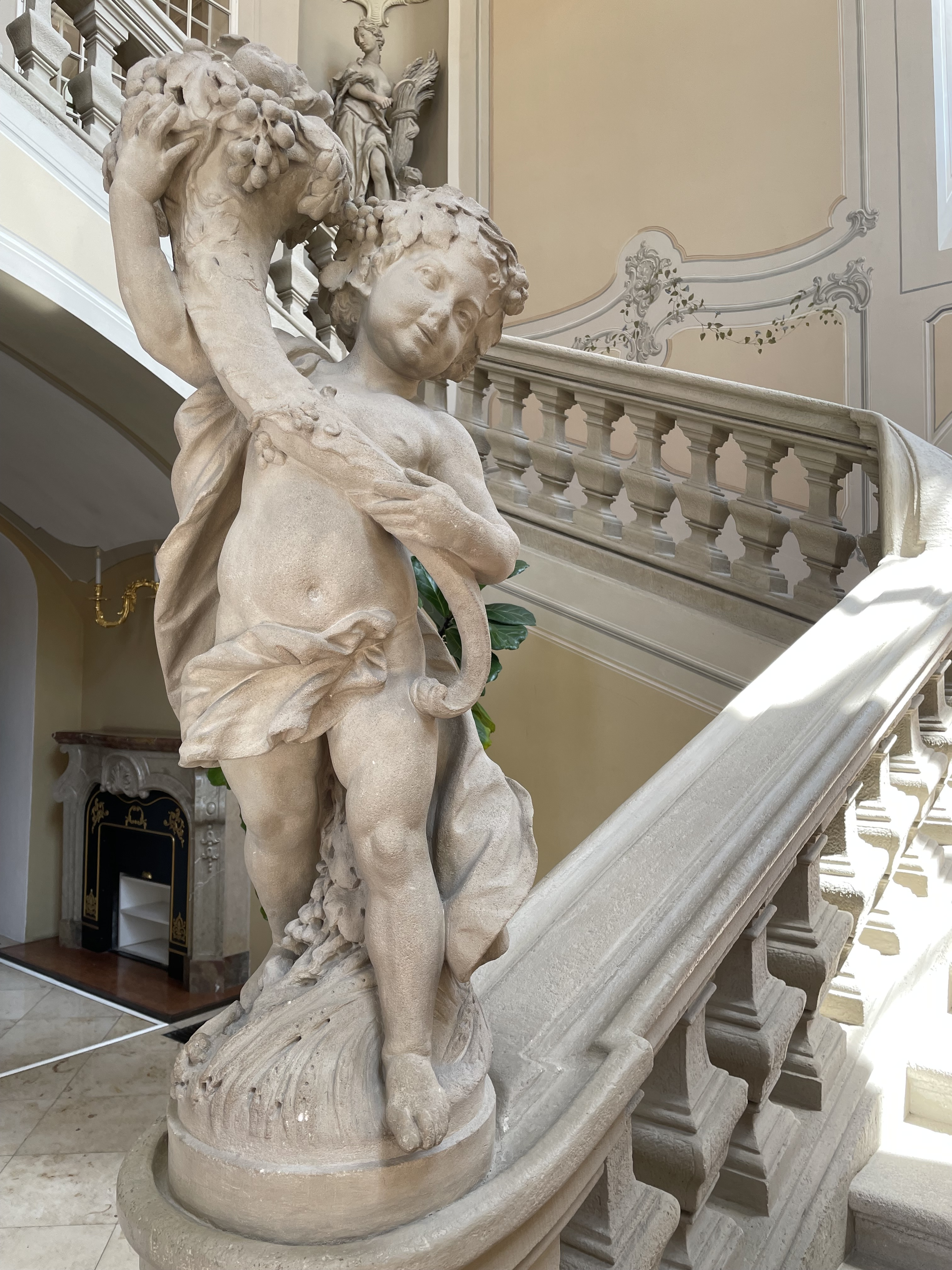
One of the two putti (right) in the main staircase of the Palace

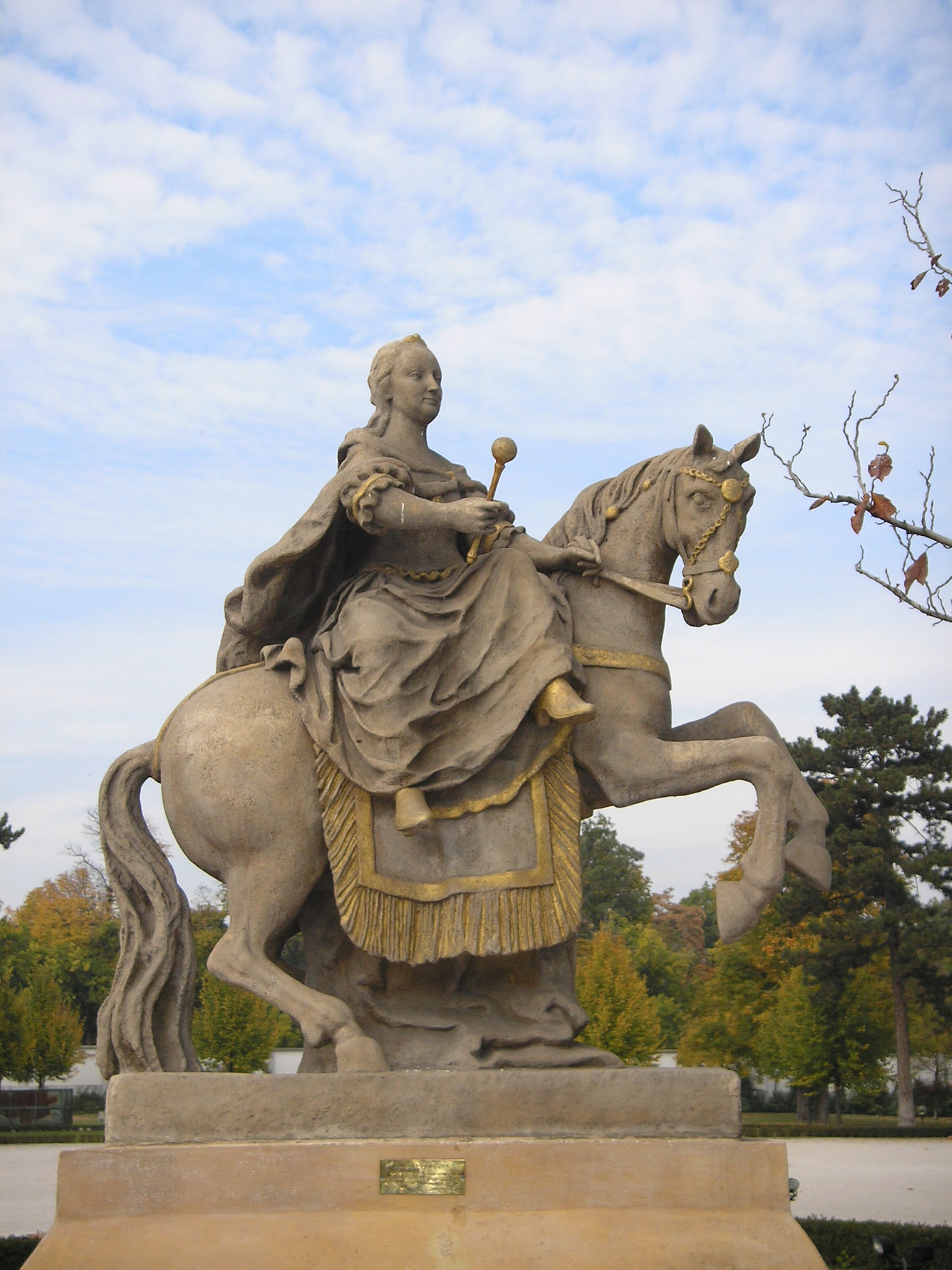
Statue of Empress Maria Theresia of Austria in the gardens of the Grassalkovich Palace
