= Emília Kováčová =

Slovakian economist (1931–2020)

First Lady of Slovakia
- In role 2 March 1993 – 2 March 1998
- President: Michal Kováč
- Preceded by: Office created
- Succeeded by: Irena Schusterová

Personal details
- Born: 8 February 1931 Bratislava, Czechoslovakia
- Died: 31 December 2020 (aged 89)
- Party: HZD
- Spouse: Michal Kováč (?–2016; his death)
- Children: Juraj; Michal
- Profession: Academic; Economist

Emília Kováčová (8 February 1931 – 31 December 2020) was a Slovak economist and professor of employment and social development at the University of Economics in Bratislava. She served as the country's first first lady of Slovakia from 1993 until 1998.

Kováčová's husband, Michal Kováč, became the first President of Slovakia upon the dissolution of Czechoslovakia in 1993. Emília Kováčová, likewise, became the first First Lady in Slovakia's history. Kováčová created and established the protocols for the new office of the First Lady. She also oversaw the restoration of Grassalkovich Palace, the country's presidential palace, during the 1990s while continuing to live at the Kováčs private home. She continued to teach economics during her tenure. In a 1998 interview with The Washington Post, Kováčová noted that she admired then-U.S. First Lady Hillary Clinton.

Kováčová continued to teach at the University of Economics in Bratislava after leaving office in 1998. She also focused on her foundation, established during her tenure as first lady, which worked to help the elderly and improve educational opportunities in Slovakia.
