= Juraj Rizman =

Slovak engineer

First Gentleman of Slovakia
- In role 15 May 2020 – 15 June 2024
- President: Zuzana Čaputová
- Preceded by: Martina Kisková (As First Lady)
- Succeeded by: Vacant

Personal details
- Born: 1 November 1976 (age 49) Bratislava, Czechoslovakia
- Spouse: divorced
- Domestic partner: Zuzana Čaputová (2020–present)
- Children: 1

Juraj Rizman (born 1 November 1976) is a Slovak communication consultant and TV presenter. He is known to the public as the partner of the Slovak President Zuzana Čaputová.

He is a former civil activist (he worked in the sector between 1993 and 2019), especially in the field of human rights protection, the environment and the defense of civil organizations. He was a long-term member of the Government Council for Non-Governmental Non-Profit Organizations (2012–2019). He worked as the director of Greenpeace in Slovakia (2008–2013) and project coordinator of Via Iuris (2016–2019). In the years 2019–2021, he first worked as an advisor to the President (2019–2020) and later to a vice-chairman of the NR SR (2020–2021).

== Biography ==
=== Childhood ===
Rizman was born on 1 November 1976. He grew up in the locality of Tehelné pole in Bratislava's Nové Mesto. He attended a sports gymnasium, devoted himself to track cycling.

=== Environmental activism ===
In 1993, at the age of 16, he started working for Greenpeace Slovakia as a volunteer. In 1994, he was detained on the ladder of the cooling tower at the Mochovce Nuclear Power Plant, for which he was fined. He took part in several protest actions, for example against nuclear weapons tests, the construction of atomic power plants, in 2007 protests against logging in Tiche and Kôpra dolina. He also protested in the Czech Republic, Hungary, Austria and Romania.

In 2008, Rizman became the director of Slovak Greenpeace, which he led until 2013. He also served as Greenpeace's director of communications for Central and Eastern Europe. He left Greenpeace in 2016.

=== Via Iuris ===
Since 2016, he worked in the civic association Via Iuris, where he was in charge of coordinating communication and campaigns. In 2018, the Civil Society Defense project was launched within the organization, within which the organization monitored attacks against civil organizations and activists, provided them with communication and legal advice.

=== State service ===
In June 2019, he became an adviser to the President of the Slovak Republic for the environment and civil society, where he worked until January 2020. After he and the president began to form a couple, after the parliamentary elections in 2020, he started working as an adviser to the vice-chairman of the National Council of the Slovak Republic, Juraj Šeliga, where he remained until the end of March 2021.

=== Business ===
Since April 2021, he is a freelancer. He is currently engaged in consulting in the field of communications, strategies and campaigns. From September 2021, he hosts the show Bezpečne SK, which he prepares in cooperation with the SME daily.

== Personal life ==
He is the partner of the President of the SR Zuzana Čaputová.

Rizman has known Čaputová since 2008, when as a Greenpeace conservationist he cooperated with the association Via Iuris with the Pezinok landfill case. They later collaborated in the communication of Čaputová's award with the Goldman Environmental Prize. In 2016, they worked together on a campaign to support the cancellation of Vladimír Mečiar's amnesties.

Rizman is divorced, he has a son from his previous marriage.

Honorary titles
Preceded by Martina Kisková as First Lady	First Gentleman of Slovakia; 2020–2024	Vacant
