= Silvia Gašparovičová =

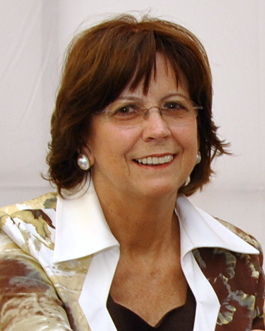
- Gašparovičová in 2011

First Lady of Slovakia
- In role 15 June 2004 – 15 June 2014
- President: Ivan Gašparovič
- Preceded by: Irena Schusterová
- Succeeded by: Martina Kisková

Personal details
- Born: Silvia Beníková; 13 January 1941 (age 85) Bratislava, Slovakia
- Party: Movement for Democracy (2002–present)
- Spouse: Ivan Gašparovič (m. 1964)
- Children: Two

Silvia Gašparovičová née Beníková (born 13 January 1941) was the First Lady of Slovakia from 2004 to 2014 as wife of former President Ivan Gašparovič.

== Early life ==
Gašparovičová attended the Slovak Technical University from 1960 until 1965 where she studied civil engineering and also from 1971 to 1973 she studied economical law at Comenius University. She worked at the Ministry of Construction from 1971 until 1991.

In 1992 she was appointed to a position of expert real estate appraiser at the Bratislava Municipal Court, which she did not hold for long. She was a private construction company's executive before her husband was elected national president.

== First Lady of Slovakia ==
As first lady, Mrs Gašparovičová has a role representing her country at official events at home and abroad.

In October 2010, she received a state visit from King Harald and Queen Sonja of Norway. She accompanied the Queen on visits to the art center Danubiana Meulensteen; the Gaudeamus Centre for disabled children; and the ÚĽUV arts center for the preservation of Slovak crafts.

After she became first lady, she founded the Silvia Gašparovičová Foundation which focuses on education and health. She also supports projects supporting women entrepreneurs, and parents.

== Honours ==
=== Foreign honours ===
- Denmark: Dame Grand Cross of the Order of the Dannebrog (October 2012).
- Spain: Dame Grand Cross of the Order of Isabella the Catholic (22 October 2007).
