= First ladies and gentlemen of Slovakia =

First Gentleman of Slovakia
- Incumbent none
- Residence: Grassalkovich Palace
- Inaugural holder: Emília Kováčová
- Formation: March 2, 1993

First lady of Slovakia or first gentleman of Slovakia (Prvá Dáma in Slovak) is the title attributed to the wife or husband of the president of Slovakia. The country's most recent first gentleman is Juraj Rizman, partner of President Zuzana Čaputová, who held the position from 2020 to 2024.

The position should not be confused with the husband or wife of the prime minister of Slovakia.

== History ==
Emília Kováčová, the country's inaugural first lady from 1993 to 1998, created the official protocols and symbols for the new office of the first lady.

== First ladies and gentlemen of Slovakia ==
Name	Portrait	Term began	Term ended	President of Slovakia	Notes
Emília Kováčová		March 2, 1993	March 2, 1998	Michal Kováč	Kováčová, an economist and academic, was Slovakia's first First Lady. She established the protocols for the new Office of the First Lady and oversaw the restoration of Grassalkovich Palace during her tenure.
Irena Schusterová		June 25, 1999	June 15, 2004	Rudolf Schuster	The country's second First Lady. Schusterová died in May 2008.
Silvia Gašparovičová		June 15, 2004	June 15, 2014	Ivan Gašparovič	
Martina Kisková		June 15, 2014	June 15, 2019	Andrej Kiska	Slovakia's youngest first lady to date.
Juraj Rizman		May 15, 2020	June 15, 2024	Zuzana Čaputová	
vacant		June 15, 2024		Peter Pellegrini	
