= Mass media in Slovakia =

In Slovakia, political information is disseminated through the mass media: television, radio, the press, and the internet. The public is becoming increasingly reliant on the internet for news, with television and the press becoming less important as news sources.

On the whole there is little overt advocacy of political platforms in the media, and Slovakia is rated fairly highly among nations in terms of freedom of the press, which is upheld under the 1992 Slovak Constitution. Subsequent legislation deals with transparency and plurality of media ownership, although the degree of transparency and plurality achieved in practice is sometimes questioned. There are different national regulatory authorities for press and broadcast media. There have been some high-profile defamation cases arising from media reports.

Television and radio broadcasters include large private sector organisations and the public service broadcaster Radio and Television of Slovakia (RTVS). There are a number of national daily printed newspapers, but none exceed around 60,000 circulation. Many more readers, especially younger ones, are using online editions of the newspapers, other online news portals, or social media.

== Overview ==
The main source (63 percent) of information about political issues for Slovak citizens is television broadcast. The second most relevant source is the Internet. Traditionally, the most trusted source of information has been radio broadcast: public radio was usually less politically biased. According to some experts, it is possible to detect that the majority of the media and journalists show liberal-right or centre-right attitudes. However, there are no typical media affiliations with specific political parties, except for newspaper Pravda, which has shown some political and ideological bias since 2010 openly declaring its liberal-left ideology. Other news outlets, instead, seem to be more influenced by commercial and indirectly by political factors than by ideological factors .

Describing a particular parallelism between media and politics, some experts noticed that some groups of voters prefers different media types than others: for instance, “nationalist- leftists” would prefer printed media, rather than “liberal-conservatives”, who would better like television news as well as social media.

The 2017 World Press Freedom Index by Reporters Without Borders ranked Slovakia 17th out of 180 countries and the NGO Freedom House described its freedom of the press status as “free” in the last years. Following the Murder of Ján Kuciak in 2018, the ranking of Slovakia slid significantly to 33 in 2020 and further to 35 in 2021.

== Media outlets ==
The most followed news outlets comprehend major private television channel Markíza, public television Rozhlas a televízia Slovenska - RTVS (Radio and Television Slovakia), and some of the key daily newspapers, especially Sme and Nový Čas. Over the years, the internet began to increasingly become an important source for information, over print media and radio as well as becoming a serious rival to television. The number of visitors to news portals is increasing, while the circulation of newspapers as well as viewers of main television news programs are declining.

=== Print ===
According to some experts, the number of regular readers of traditional daily printed press is around a quarter of the population. Moreover, there is an increasing number of those who subscribe and read only online editions. However, according to some experts, the average circulation is less than half of the average of the European Union member states. The most popular tabloid newspapers are Nový čas (New Time) and Plus JEDEN DEŇ (One More Day), while the main news outlets are Pravda (Truth), Sme (We Are), Denník N (Daily N) and business/economic daily Hospodárske noviny (Economy Newspaper). According to the newspaper itself, Pravda’s daily circulation in 2015 reached over 61,000 copies. As to Sme, in September 2016 its circulation was over 27,000. As to the newspaper Hospodárske noviny, it sold 11,650 copies in September 2016. There also is a regional newspaper in Hungarian language named Új Szó (New Word), sold in the southern parts of Slovakia, which distributed 17,500 copies in September 2016.

=== Radio ===
Rádio Expres is the market leader, followed by the public radio first channel Rádio Slovensko (SRo) and by Fun rádio.

=== Television ===
TA3 is the first and only cable and satellite 24-hour television news channel in Slovakia. It started broadcasting in September 2001. The most popular TV station is commercial broadcaster TV Markíza. This market leader is followed by TV JOJ. The first public television channel Jednotka is at third place. According to a 2008 research by the Institute for Public Affairs, the news programs of privately owned television companies were the main source of information for up to 38 percent of the population, while the news coverage of public service broadcaster Slovak Television (STV) reached around 25 percent of the population. In December 2010, it merged with Slovak Rádio's (SRo) creating the Radio and Television of Slovakia (Rozhlas a televízia Slovenska, RTVS). The public service television broadcast has two units. The first, called Jednotka, is a general information, education, and entertainment/sports channel. The second unit, Dvojka, focuses on more educated viewers as well as specific groups such as ethnic and religious minorities, and socio-professional groups (e.g. soldiers or fishermen). Increasingly, foreign television broadcasts are watched in Slovakia: they are especially Czech, Hungarian and some German language television channels, but also comprehend other foreign language channels which are followed by younger generations.

=== Online media ===
According to the 2016 Eurobarometer, the Internet is used daily or almost daily by 53 percent of the population, but significantly more often by younger generations. In the age group 15–24, this percentage increases to 91 percent. It is significant that 60 percent of respondents to the Eurobarometer survey believe that social media are modern media where to get information about political issues.

Many people in Slovakia read the online versions of newspapers as well as online-only newspapers and news sites. In 2023, the highest trafficked news portals included Aktuality.sk, Sme.sk, Topky.sk, Pravda.sk and Cas.sk.

Moreover, traditional media increasingly use social media for various purposes. For example, two scandals covering overpriced costs for the opening ceremony by the Ministry of Foreign and European Affairs as well as the prime minister Robert Fico’s controversial attack on “some anti-Slovak journalists“ became very popular in the social media since two newspapers uploaded the related audio files in their Facebook pages.

In Slovakia, it is common for politicians to establish their own blogs within the websites of some newspapers: this is the case for Prime Minister Fico's blog on Sme’s website. Robert Fico received some 36,000 average readership since April 2011. Blogs of the most important politicians are hosted by the websites Sme, Trend, Hospodárske noviny and Denník N. As to 2010, the biggest domestic social website used to be Pokec.sk (belonging to the online leader, Azet.sk), with an average of 1.2 million unique users per month. However, as to 2011, the international ranking system Alexa.com considered Facebook to be the second-most visited website after Google.

=== News agencies ===
The News Agency of the Slovak Republic (TASR) evolved from the previous federal news agency in 1992. This is a public service institution under Act No. 358/2008 on the News Agency of the Slovak Republic. Secondly, there is the private SITA agency, established in 1997. In addition, there is the Press Agency of Cities and Villages of Slovakia (TAMO), which focuses on regional events.

== Legal framework ==
Television broadcasting, radio broadcasting and retransmission of programme services as well as some of the online broadcasting and audiovisual services on demand are regulated by Law No. 308/2000 on Broadcasting and Retransmission and the Law on Digital Broadcasting No. 220/2007. Instead, the Slovak Press Act (No. 167/2008) firstly deals with transparency of media ownership and is aimed at maintaining plurality of information.

As to the possibility of using languages other than Slovak in media broadcasting, the regulations are particularly complicated and do not always fully guarantee the right to use minority languages. Such regulations are mainly Law No. 270/1995 on State Language of the Slovak Republic and Law No. 184/1999 on the Use of Languages of National Minorities.

The Slovak Constitution (1992) protects freedom of expression and prohibits censorship, under Article 26. The same norm also prohibits a licensing system for the press.

In Slovakia, defamation is punishable by up to eight years in prison under Article No. 373 of the Criminal Code, making it the harshest penalty for this offense in the European Union. Prosecution is also provided for other kinds of expression, such as denial of the Holocaust or of the Armenian genocide and defamation of nationalities. According to a 2017 study, positive trends can be observed with regard to defamation: Slovak courts increasingly refer to the standards of the European Court of Human Rights and recognize the need for proportionality in their decisions in defamation cases.

The Act on Free Access to Information (2000) allows anyone to request information from state agencies. However, even if noncompliant officials may be subject to fines, very often such requests remain unanswered.

There are different national regulation authorities controlling different sectors of the Slovak media: the print media are regulated by the Press Council (TRSR), established in 2001, while broadcast media are regulated by the Council for Broadcasting and Retransmission (RVR). A regulation enacted in April 2014 limits the number of journalists accredited to the parliament as well as their freedom of movement within the parliament's structures.

== Censorship and media freedom ==
The 2017 World Press Freedom Index by Reporters Without Borders ranked Slovakia 17th out of 180 countries and the NGO Freedom House described its freedom of the press status as “free” in the last years. As to the existence of high criminal and civil defamation penalties, the requested damages are often very high, especially when coming from powerful figures such as politicians and businessmen. Prime Minister Robert Fico himself initiated several of these lawsuits during his first term: when asked about a corruption case during a news conference in November 2016, he addressed several journalists as “filthy anti-Slovak prostitutes”. According to a 2016 study, although a high number of charges against journalists were moved through defamation charges, there were no final convictions of journalists for defamation between 2010 and 2014. Also judges are often among the plaintiffs in defamation cases against Slovak journalists: for instance, in the so-called Bonanno case, eight judges sued the publishers of the tabloid Nový Čas in 2013 over an article and some photos depicting them while wearing blue ear protectors and sporting mock assault rifles at a party. It happened a few months after seven people were murdered by a gunman wearing similar ear protectors. In January 2014, the European Court of Human Rights awarded a total of €30,000 to Ringier Axel Springer, the owner of Nový Čas, since Slovak courts failed to protect the newspaper's right to free expression in several cases. The Strasbourg Court found that the Slovak courts failed to strike an appropriate balance between freedom of expression and the right to privacy. The Slovak state reduced funding for the Council for Broadcasting and Retransmission (RVR) from €1.19 million in 2013 to €1.13 million the following year, while doubling the amount the RVR was expected to collect in fees and fines. Some media experts have expressed concern that this choice could threaten broadcasting independence, incentivizing RVR to issue fines. Separately, in 2012, Jaroslav Haščák, co-owner of Penta- a private business implicated in the so-called Gorilla case, a major corruption scandal- unsuccessfully asked for court injunctions against several websites that had published the core files regarding such scandal, and against a related book by the Canadian-Slovak investigative journalist Tom Nicholson. In 2013, police pressured Nicholson to reveal his sources. Recently, the takeover of the public broadcaster RTVS (Radio and Television of Slovakia) by Jaroslav Rezník raised concerns about possible political pressures on media. Rezník would allegedly have close ties with the conservative Slovak National Party (SNS) and works in the media sector since over 20 years. He used to head the Slovak Radio.

Complaints regarding freedom of the press or access of journalists to information are received by the Press Council of Slovakia (TRSR)

== Media ownership, political and economic pressure on media ==
According to some experts, media ownership in Slovakia lacks of transparency: in particular, no adequate regulation on the cross-ownership of outlets exists. The authority which is enabled to rule on media ownership matters (e.g. cartels, abuses of dominant position) is the Antimonopoly Office of the Slovak Republic (PMU).

Comparing Slovakia with its neighbours, Hungary and Poland, the International Press Institute considered that political power in Slovakia remains more varied: the country is governed by a three-party coalition and public discourse remains relatively plural. However, politicians are successfully using influential media to campaign for their faction, while the latter also spread populist contents.

As to the Pravda newspaper, its ownership structure is unclear. Officially, there is a single owner: the daily has been owned by the Florena company since 2010. However, the company's headquarters are in Prague and the deal for its sale was facilitated by the Slovak investment group J&T. Some consider this financial group as linked to businessmen close to the political party Smer SD, led by Prime Minister Robert Fico.

Sme newspaper is co-owned by Penta, which has a minority share (45%). This acquisition intensified the concerns regarding concentration of media ownership, since Penta has enlarged its media market since 2014. It also purchased the publishing house Trend Holding (which publishes the weekly Trend and portal Medialne.sk), as well as the publishing company Spolo?nos? 7 Plus (which publishes, among others, the newspaper Plus JEDEN DEŇ, weekly Plus 7 dní and the web portal Aktualne.sk). As to the newspaper Hospodárske noviny, it was a federal weekly periodical until the dissolution of Czechoslovakia in 1993. It is now owned by the Czech tycoon and politician Andrej Babiš. Fun rádio is owned by Boris Kollár, MP and current head of the political party Sme rodina. He is the only owner of the Fun Media Group a.s., which own ten local radios and some web portals too. Markíza Group operates TV Markíza, Doma and Dajto. It also operates portal Tvnoviny.sk. Some other minor TV channels belong to JOJ Group (also called JOJ Media House). JOJ Media House owns the Harad company, which through another company provides complex services to some private radio broadcasters. With regard to economic and political pressures on media, reporting by the television news station TA3 is probably more influenced by commercial and indirectly by political factors (i.e. who is in power) than by ideological factors. This TV channel has a Slovak owner, the Grafobal Company, which is primarily involved in the production of print and packaging materials but its owner is active in many other business activities.

According to some experts, digitization poses a threat to the public service broadcaster Slovak Television (STV) rather than presenting new opportunities. The most significant reason is that the political elite gave control over Digital Video Broadcasting — Terrestrial (DVB-T) transition to organized interest groups (i.e. private broadcasters and Towercom, the monopolistic provider of digital terrestrial signals).

== Murder of investigative journalist Ján Kuciak in 2018 ==
The investigative journalist Ján Kuciak and his fiancée Martina Kušnírová were shot dead in February 2018 in Slovakia, after the journalist had been investigating mafia links with local politicians. The Murder of Ján Kuciak significantly tarnished the image of Slovakia when it comes to its freedom of press.

== Disinformation ==
Experts have studied pro-Russian disinformation campaigns in Slovakia, which originates from multiple sources: numerous pro-Russian websites, social media communities, printed periodicals as well as radio broadcasts. Following the 2022 Russian invasion of Ukraine, Slovakia passed a law allowing the public authorities to block websites in order to pare Russian propaganda.

== See also ==
- List of newspapers in Slovakia
- Telecommunications in Slovakia
