= List of newspapers in Slovakia =

This is a list of newspapers published in Slovakia.

== Daily newspapers ==
Title	Website	Established	Owner	Notes
Sme	website	1993	Petit Press	the best-selling Slovak political-oriented daily, centre-right in political orientation
Korzár	website	1998	Petit Press	political-oriented daily on East of Slovakia, the only daily regional newspaper in Slovakia
Denník N	website	2015	N Press	political-oriented daily, centre-right in political orientation
Pravda	website	1920	Our Media SR	political-oriented daily, centre-left in political orientation, the oldest daily newspaper in Slovakia
Hospodárske noviny	website	1993	Mafra Slovakia	business-oriented daily
Nový Čas	website	1991	News and Media Holding	tabloid, the best-selling newspaper in Slovakia
Plus jeden deň	website	2006	News and Media Holding	tabloid
Denník Šport	website	1947	Šport Press	sport-oriented daily

== Weekly newspapers ==
Title	Website	Established	Owner	Notes
MY	website		Petit Press	multi-regional newspaper
Katolícke noviny	website	1849	Spolok svätého Vojtecha	Christian newspaper
Prešovský večerník	website	1990		regional newspaper based in Prešov
Roľnícke noviny	website	1930	Profi Press	farming and agricultural newspaper
Sninské noviny	website	2002		regional newspaper based in Snina
Záhorák	website	1960	Záhorák	regional newspaper
Zdravotnícke noviny	website	1952	News and Media Holding	medical newspaper
Žilinský večerník	website	1991	Publishing House	regional newspaper based in Žilina

== Free regional weekly newspapers ==
Title	Website	Owner	Notes
ECHO	website	Petit Press	multi-regional newspapers
Pardon	website	Petit Press	multi-regional newspapers
Regionálne noviny	website	Region Press	multi-regional newspapers
Bratislavský kuriér	website	Staromešťan	regional newspaper based in Bratislava
Bratislavské noviny	website	Nivel Plus	regional newspaper based in Bratislava

== Other language newspapers ==
Title	Website	Language	Established	Owner	Notes
The Slovak Spectator	website	English	1995	Petit Press	
Új Szó	website	Hungarian	1948	DUEL - PRESS	

== Defunct ==
Title	Established	Ceased publication	Owner	Notes
Košický večer	1969	2004	Petit Press	daily regional newspaper based in Košice
Národná obroda	1990	2005	Pegas 2 Slovakia	daily newspaper
24 hodín	2005	2006	Pegas 2 Slovakia	daily newspaper
Kysucký večerník	2013	2017	Publishing House	weekly regional newspaper
Noviny Poprad	1990	2019	The City of Poprad	weekly regional newspaper based in Poprad
Podtatranské noviny	1960	2020		weekly regional newspaper based in Poprad

== See also ==
- List of newspapers
