= Fedor Vico =

Slovak caricaturist

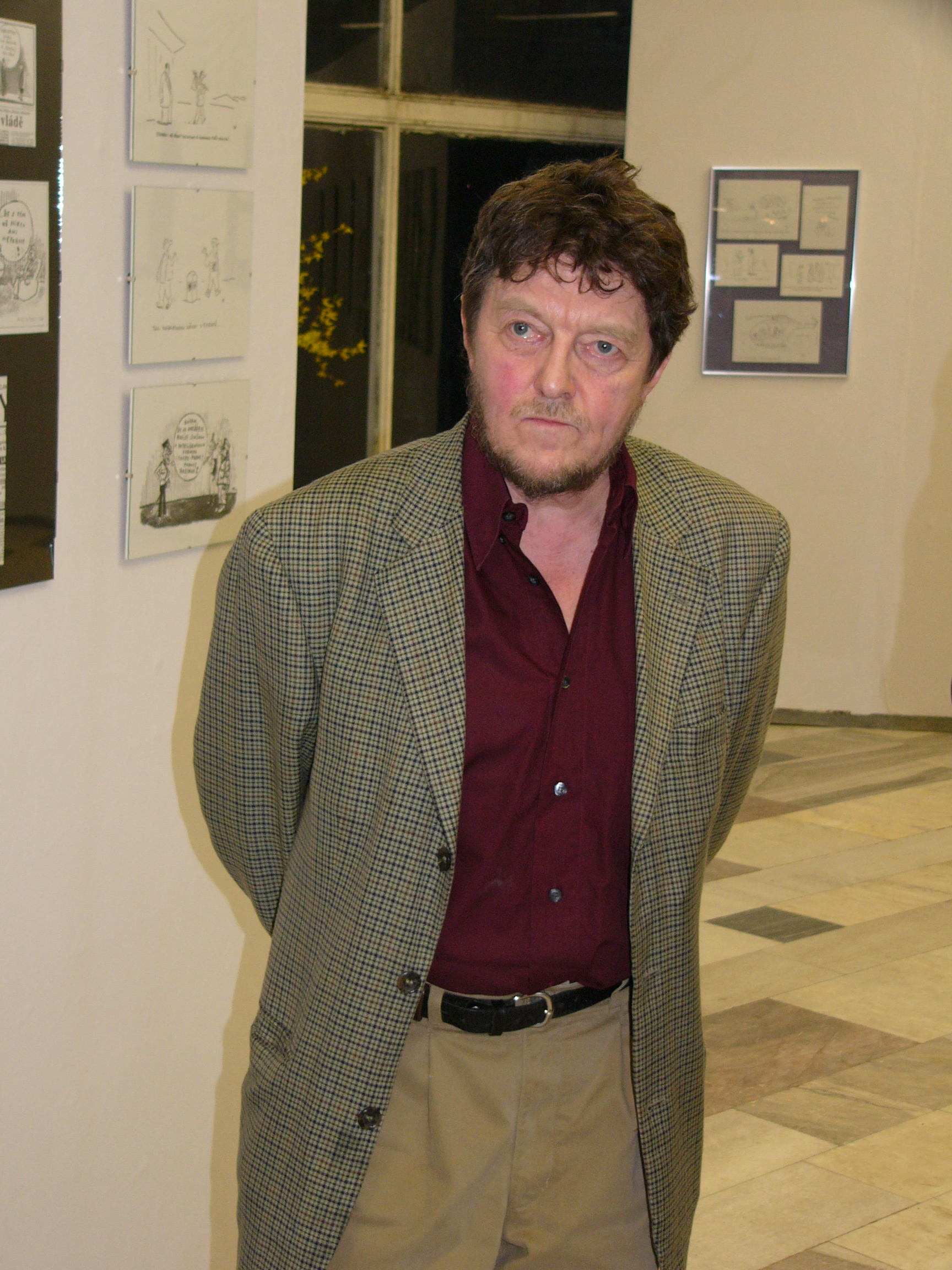
Vico in 2007

Fedor Vico (born 9 November 1944) is a Slovak caricaturist.

== Early life ==
Fedor Vico was born on 9 November 1944, in the eastern Slovak village of Šapinec (today part of Okrúhle). He studied at the Secondary School of Arts and Crafts in Bratislava.

== Work ==
He started to collaborate with humoristic magazine Roháč, for which he created the popular cartoon Jánošík. The series was published in book form in 1969. As he also criticised the political situation at the time, the book was withdrawn and he was banned from publishing. It was not until 1975 that he received permission, but only for regional press. He chose to work for Nove žitja, where he published the Rusyn series Il'ko Sova z Bajusova. Later, he decided to publish Il'ko Sova z Bajusova in Narodny novinky (a Rusyn newspaper).

He also made caricatures for Slovak SME and Czech Lidové noviny.

== Awards ==
- Slovak Literary Fund Award
- Prešov City Award
- Journalist Award for 2011 in the category of Czech-Slovak cartoon joke, comics, caricature for a series of caricatures in Hospodárske noviny

== Other activities ==
Vico is the vice-chairman of Rusínska Obroda (Rusyn Revival, non-governmental organisation). He was among the six people featured in the 2006 documentary film Iné svety (Other Worlds) directed by Marko Škop.
