= Domestic policy of Robert Fico =

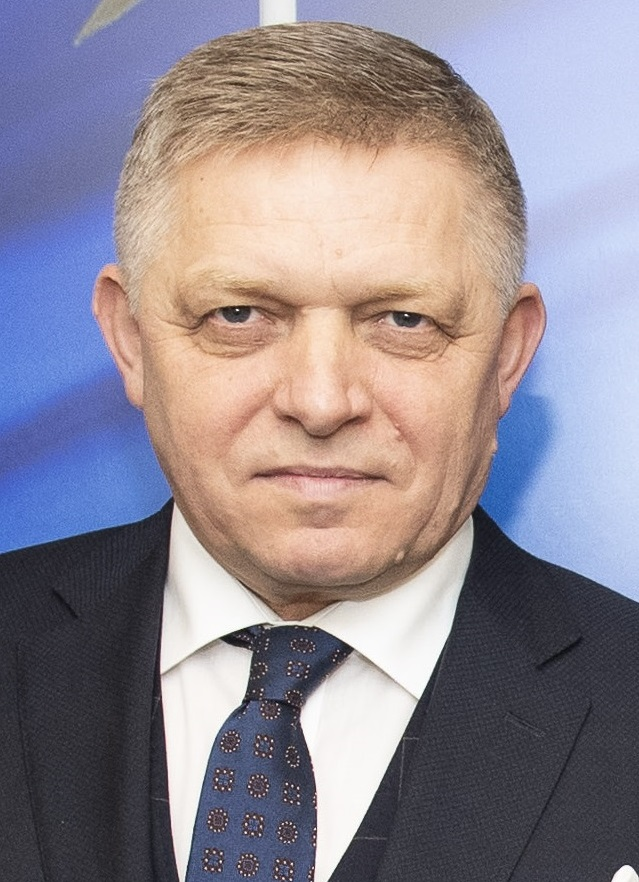
Robert Fico in 2023

Robert Fico’s domestic policy as Prime Minister of Slovakia focuses on strong government involvement in the economy, social support and national sovereignty.

His governments have increased the minimum wage, introduced extra (thirteenth) pensions and expanded social benefits. Economically, he prefers the government to control important industries like utilities, infrastructure and healthcare instead of selling them to private companies.

On social and cultural issues, Fico promotes traditional values. His government strongly opposes illegal migration, EU refugee quotas and has limited certain rights for LGBTQ+ people.

== Immigration and Islam ==
Fico rejected European Commission's plan to distribute refugees and economic migrants from the Middle East and Africa among EU member states, saying: "As long as I am prime minister, mandatory quotas will not be implemented on Slovak territory." He stated that "thousands of terrorists and Islamic State fighters are entering Europe with migrants, and added: "We monitor every single Muslim in Slovakia."

In May 2016, Fico stated that Slovakia would not accept "one single Muslim" migrant into the country, weeks before the country was scheduled to take over the Presidency of the Council of the EU. He further stated: "When I say something now, maybe it will seem strange, but I'm sorry, Islam has no place in Slovakia. I think it is the duty of politicians to talk about these things very clearly and openly. I do not wish there were tens of thousands of Muslims".

On 30 November 2016, the Slovak Parliament, under the government led by Fico, passed a bill significantly increasing the minimum threshold for a religious movement or organization to achieve state recognition. The required number of verified practicing members was raised from 20,000 to 50,000. This legislation has been widely viewed as an explicit measure to prevent Islam from gaining state-recognized status in Slovakia. Islam is not an official religion in Slovakia and there are no officially recognized mosques.

Fico strongly opposed the EU's Asylum and Migration Pact finalized in 2024, particularly the solidarity mechanism. He stated that Slovakia will not implement the rule that requires member states to either accept a share of asylum seekers or pay a financial contribution of €20,000 per person if they refuse, calling this a "dictate" rather than genuine solidarity and saying that out of "100% of illegal migrants who arrive in Europe, 80% stay there, and only 20% we manage to get back".

== LGBTQ+ ==
Fico's gender policy is highly conservative and centered on restricting the rights and recognition of LGBTQ+ individuals under the banner of upholding traditional values and national identity against "gender ideology". Fico reportedly stated he did not want people "who will claim to be women and have a 20cm dick between their legs."

In 2023, Fico referred to adoption by same-sex couples as a "perversion", stated that he would never support same-sex marriage. He said that "gender ideology in schools is unacceptable".

This political stance was formally enacted as law by a September 2025 constitutional amendment, passed by his government, which recognizes only male and female as genders, severely limits adoption to married heterosexual couples, and asserts the primacy of Slovak law over EU law on such "cultural-ethical issues".

== Privatizations ==
Throughout his political career, Robert Fico has strongly opposed selling off important state businesses and public services to private companies. He often called past privatizations by rival political parties corrupt and a form of "theft".

One of his very first and most decisive actions upon coming to power in 2006 was the cancellation of the Bratislava Airport sale to the TwoOne consortium, which was led by Vienna Airport and included the Czech-Slovak group Penta Investments. Fico's government officially scrapped the deal, stating that the airport was a strategic company that the state must retain control of it for economic and security reasons.

A central policy of his first government was to ban private health insurance companies from distributing profits to their shareholders, stating that public funds intended for treatment should not be privatized. This policy led to an international arbitration case, which the Slovak Republic ultimately lost, resulting in the International Court of Arbitration awarding damages of €22 million to Achmea, the Dutch owner of the health insurance company Union. The ban on distributing profits was later ruled unconstitutional by the Constitutional Court. Fico's subsequent governments pushed for the expropriation or buyout of the remaining private health insurers, in order to establish a single state insurer to "stop the inflow of funds to private provider," a goal he has yet to fully achieve.

In 2008, Fico threatened the foreign owners of energy monopolies such as SPP (the French Gaz de France and the German E.ON) with the nationalization and seizure of their ownership shares if they "make policies that go against state policy, against the interests of this state and its people".

Fico's anti-privatization stance extended to the strategic Gabčíkovo Dam, whose lucrative hydroelectric plant operation had been leased to the privatized utility, majority-owned by Italy's Enel. Stating the 2006 lease was illegal and against national interest, Fico's government launched a lengthy legal and political campaign. This culminated in the state successfully taking back full operational control of the power plant in 2015, which Fico presented as reclaiming a critical national asset from foreign private ownership.

== Social policy ==
Fico's domestic social policy is fundamentally built on social populism, prioritizing tangible benefits for key electoral demographics, specifically older and lower-income citizens. A cornerstone of this policy is the "thirteenth pension," an annual payment designed to provide crucial financial support to pensioners, positioning himself as a guardian of the elderly's financial security.

His governments have consistently aimed to reverse austerity measures imposed by center-right cabinets, increasing other social benefits and intervening to limit the rise in costs for essential services like utilities and prescription medications.. Furthermore, his administration introduced free rail transport for large demographic groups, including students up to age 26 and pensioners, a measure intended to lower living costs and solidify a perceived social safety net.

Fico has made the continual and significant increase of the national minimum wage, often boasting about its multi-fold rise since his first government and arguing that it is essential to ensure that "it is not possible for someone who works to live under the poverty limit". Fico's government implemented a significant increase in night shift bonuses, as well as bonuses for weekend and public holiday work, to directly improve the wages of lower-income workers.

Fico also advocated for a four-day working week to be introduced, initially as an experiment where business conditions allow for agreement between employers and unions. He stated at the World Economic Forum in Davos in 2024 that Slovakia could soon be among the countries adopting this measure. The four-day working week has not been implemented during his time in office.

He has promised a "return to the values of a social state," often criticizing the prior "right-wing reforms" by saying they were "for the rich" and vowing to continue reforms but "not on the backs of the people". This policy boosted the living standards of his base through subsidies and generous state spending. Critics say it is fiscally irresponsible, potentially jeopardizing the long-term sustainability of public finances in favor of short-term political gains.

== Wars ==
During his first government, which began in 2006, Fico fulfilled a campaign promise by withdrawing Slovak troops from the Iraq War in early 2007, describing the US-led invasion as "unbelievably unjust and wrong". Fico said that the security situation there was "catastrophic", that "to speak about any democracy in Iraq is a fantasy," and that the entry of foreign armies had only caused immense tension. He said the Iraq commitment was a reckless "oil adventure", contrasting it with the NATO mission in Afghanistan, which he said "conforms to international law" and which he subsequently increased.

His governments maintained Slovakia's participation in the NATO-led War in Afghanistan for many years. Slovak soldiers, including Special Operations Forces, served in Afghanistan in non-combat roles such as training, advisory, and base security throughout Fico's first three terms (2006–2010, 2012–2016 and 2016–2018).

In 2023, Fico's foreign policy turned toward non-involvement in the Russo-Ukrainian war. Fico said that "some European leaders are tired of 80 years of peace" and want to escalate tensions with Russia. He said that "I will never be a wartime prime minister" and criticized the European Union, stating, "If the EU spent as much energy on peace as it does on supporting the war in Ukraine, the war could have been over long ago". After taking office in 2023, his government fulfilled an election promise by terminating all military aid to Kyiv while continuing to send humanitarian aid. His government has since refused to participate in any EU scheme to finance military aid to Ukraine, stating that the conflict cannot be solved on the battlefield.

In January 2026, Fico criticized U.S. intervention in Venezuela, characterizing it as a violation of international law and reflecting the broader decline of the post-World War II global order. He emphasized his strong opposition, stating that he "resolutely rejects" such violations of international norms. Fico drew parallels to his earlier positions on the 2003 invasion of Iraq and Russia’s invasion of Ukraine.

Following the U.S. military strike on Iran in February 2026, Fico criticized the dominance of great powers, stating that "the big and powerful do as they please, while we, the small, can only watch and grumble".

== Relationship with the media ==
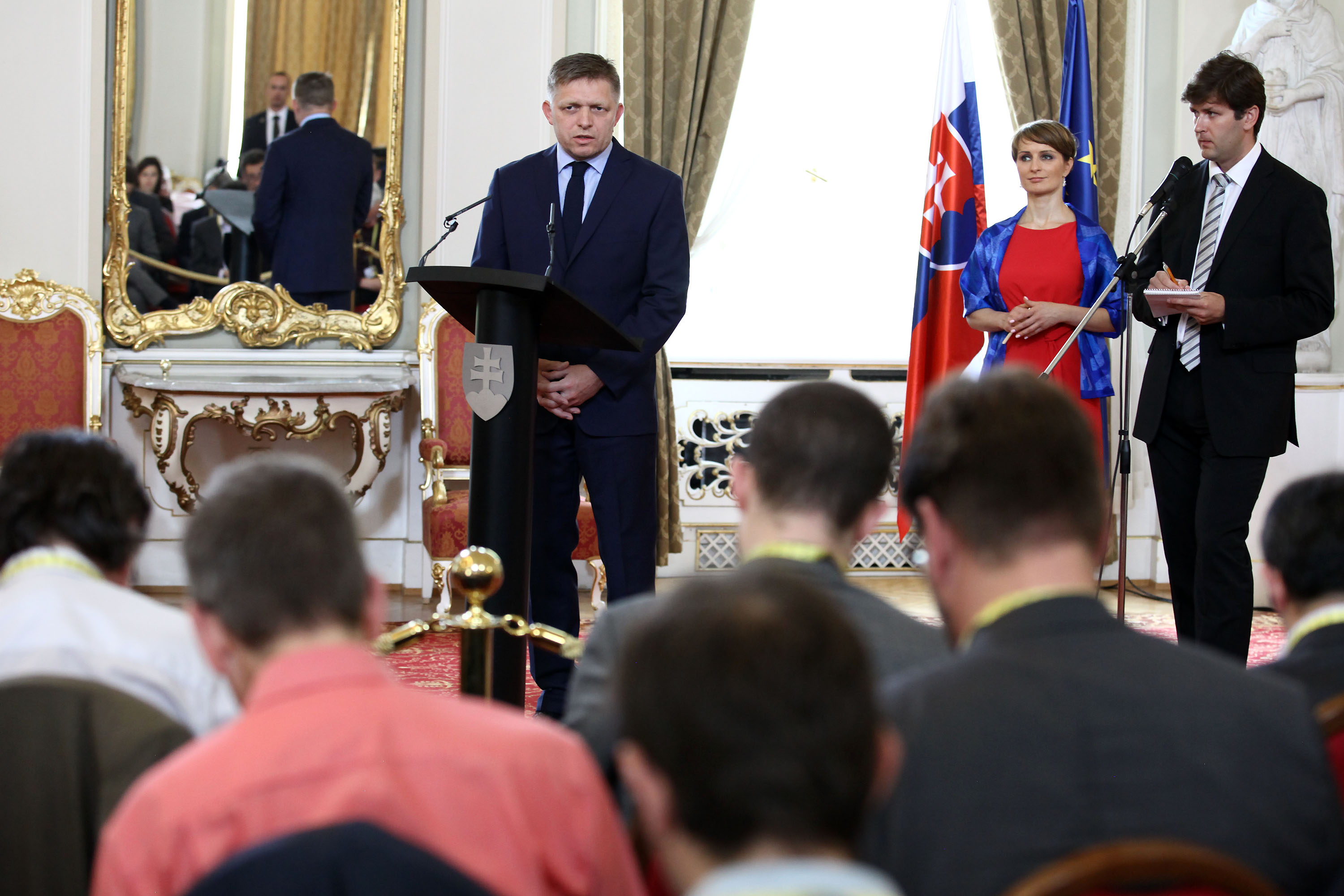
Fico at a press press conference in Bratislava, June 2016

During his press conferences, Robert Fico often verbally attacks, belittles, and taunts the present journalists, often accusing them of bias and attacking his government. On several occasions he has openly and on record used profanities against specific journalists, such as "idiots", "pricks", "prostitutes", "snakes", and "hyenas". He has also been recorded ridiculing journalists' physical appearance.

=== Verbal attacks ===
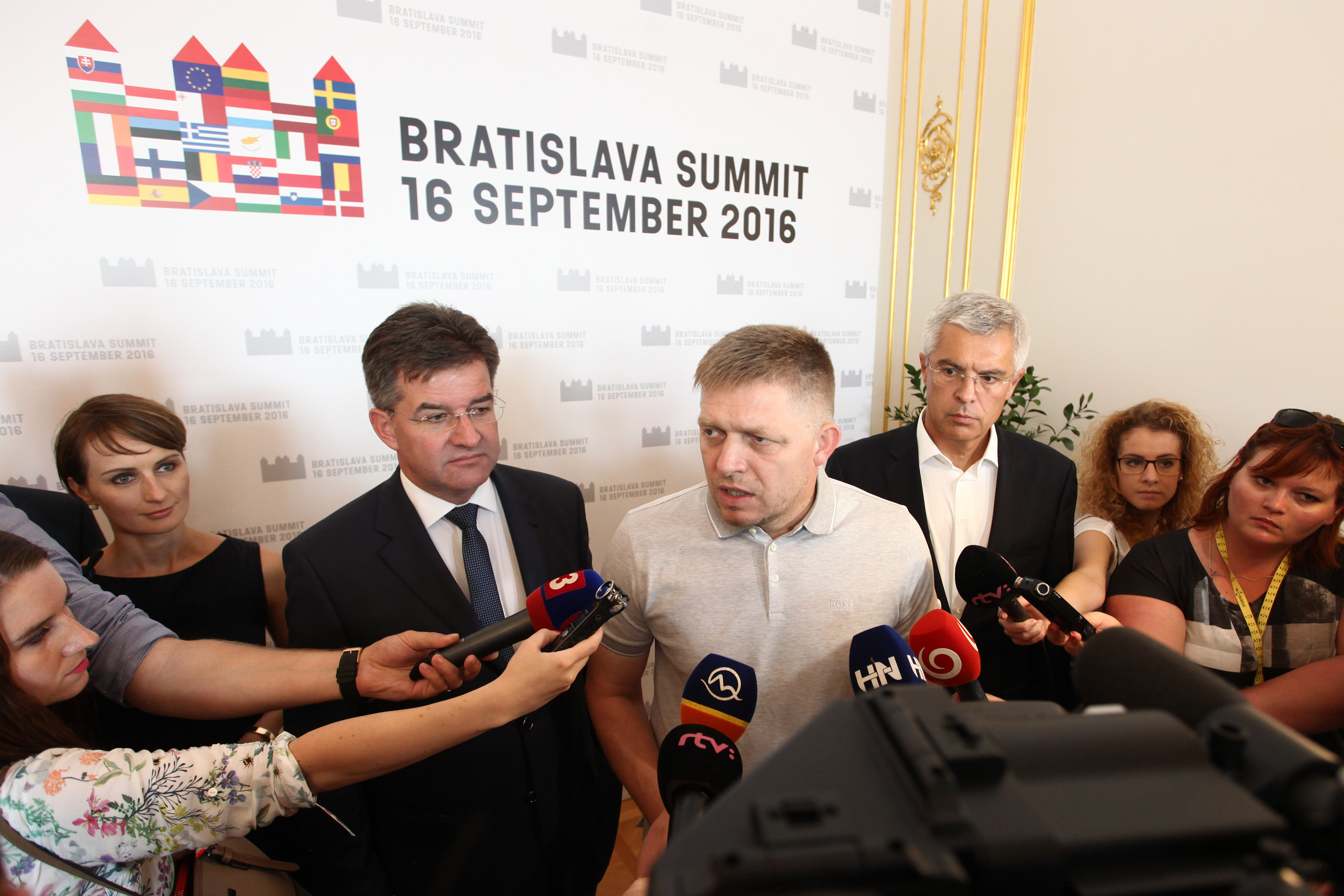
Robert Fico meeting Slovak reporters at the Bratislava Summit during Slovakia's EU presidency, September 2016

In 2009, Fico repeatedly described the Slovak press as a "new opposition force" that was biased and was harming national and state interests. Fico also accused the press of failing to "stand behind the common people."

In July 2012, Fico declared "Eternal Peace" between him and the Slovak press. He also stated his desire to change his attitude towards the media, saying "I think it is enough" and that he does not plan any further lawsuits against media outlets except in extraordinary situations. Fico further said: "You have to spend an incredible amount of energy on it [lawsuits], it means several years of conflict, one conflict takes usually five or six years [to resolve]." He added that lawsuits involve "legal fees, paying a lawyer, everything around that".

In November 2016, Fico termed journalists questioning him about allegations of public procurement rules during Slovakia's EU presidency as "dirty, anti-Slovak prostitutes". He also stated the accusations were a targeted attack to smear the country's presidency of the EU.

In November 2021, Fico described journalists as "Soros' corrupt gang of swines". He says that the media is "obsessed" with him and his party; they want to "destroy" it and are "waging a jihad against it."

In 2022, Fico repeatedly stated that journalists were an "organized criminal group with the aim of breaking Slovak statehood".

=== Cartoon ===
In July 2009, Fico faced genuine cervical spine problems (neck and back pain). This inspired a cartoon by Martin Šútovec (Shooty) in the daily Sme, which controversially depicted Fico's X-ray showing "no spine" and his pain as merely "phantom". Fico strongly objected, filing a lawsuit for €33,000, arguing the cartoon made fun of his serious health condition.

The court ruled against Fico in 2010, upholding the cartoon as protected political satire and exaggeration. After losing at the lower courts and having the case returned by the Supreme Court on a technicality, Fico ultimately withdrew the lawsuit in March 2013, ending the protracted legal battle.

=== Book cover ===
In August 2024, Fico initiated a high-profile lawsuit against the editor-in-chief of the news website Aktuality.sk, Peter Bárdy, and the publisher Ringier Slovak Media, over the unauthorized use of his photograph chosen for the cover of Bárdy's 2023 book, Fico – Obsessed with Power (Fico – Posadnutý mocou).

Fico objected not to the book's critical content, but strictly to the image, with his lawyers claiming that Fico "has the right to decide how his photograph is used" and demanding an apology and €100,000 in damages from each party.

Condemning the lawsuit, the European Centre for Press and Media Freedom and its Media Freedom Rapid Response partners released a statement characterizing the action as a SLAPP (Strategic Lawsuit Against Public Participation), designed to intimidate journalists and halt investigative reporting.

=== Press Freedom Predator ===
In October 2025, Fico was included on the Reporters Without Borders (RSF) 2025 list of Press Freedom Predators under the "Social" category. The RSF placed Slovakia 38th out of 180 countries in its 2025 press freedom rankings. According to RSF, "social" predators "smear media and promote mistrust of journalists". In its assessment, the RSF cited various terms that Fico had used to describe journalists. It also mentioned political control of public broadcasting. The full list of those named as 2025 Press Freedom Predators in the "social" category included Elon Musk, HonestReporting, Margarita Simonyan, OpIndia and Javier Milei.

=== Trump comments ===
In January 2026, a report by Politico claimed Fico had privately expressed concerns about U.S. President Donald Trump's mental health. The original report, citing anonymous European diplomats, alleged that Fico described Trump as "dangerous" and "out of his mind" following their January 17 meeting at Mar-a-Lago. Fico said he "strongly reject the lies of the Politico portal".

Fico dismissed the claims as "boundless media lies", stating that he did not make the remarks. The White House supported Fico’s position, with a spokesperson labeling the story "total fake news" and characterizing the meeting in Florida as positive and productive.

In a statement addressing the controversy, Fico characterized Politico as a "sad look at the liberal and progressive political and media world”.

== See also ==
- Foreign policy of Robert Fico
