= Sports Network =

A sports network broadcasts sporting events, sports news, and other related programming.

Sports Network may refer to one of the following specific companies:

- Sports Network, a former name of the defunct Hughes Television Network, an American television network launched in 1956
- The Sports Network (TSN), a Canadian sports cable channel launched in 1984
- The Sports Network (wire service), a former American sports wire service that closed in 2015

== See also ==
- Sportsnet (disambiguation)
