= Hospodarske noviny =

Hospodarske noviny is name of two newspapers, written without diacritics:

- Hospodářské noviny (English: Economic Newspaper) in the Czech Republic
- Hospodárske noviny (English: Economic Newspaper) in Slovakia
