= Sportsnet (disambiguation) =

Sportsnet is group of Canadian regional sports networks.

Sportsnet or sportnet may also refer to:

== Sportsnet ==
Current American regional sports networks

- Comcast SportsNet, the group of networks now known as NBC Sports Regional Networks
- Spectrum Sports the group of networks previously known as Time Warner Cable SportsNet
  - Spectrum SportsNet
  - Spectrum SportsNet LA
- SportsNet Pittsburgh
- Based in New York:
  - MSG Sportsnet
  - SportsNet New York

Defunct American regional sports networks

- AT&T SportsNet, the former group of networks owned AT&T
- Fox Sports Net, the former group of networks owned by Fox Sports

== Sportnet ==
- Sportnet or Screensport (TV channel), a Europe-wide sports TV channel that existed from 1984 to 1993 and operated under the name "Sportnet" in the Dutch market
- Sportnet.hr, a Croatian sporting news website
- Športnet (sportnet.sme.sk), a Slovak sporting news website operated by the SME newspaper
