= Foreign policy of Robert Fico =

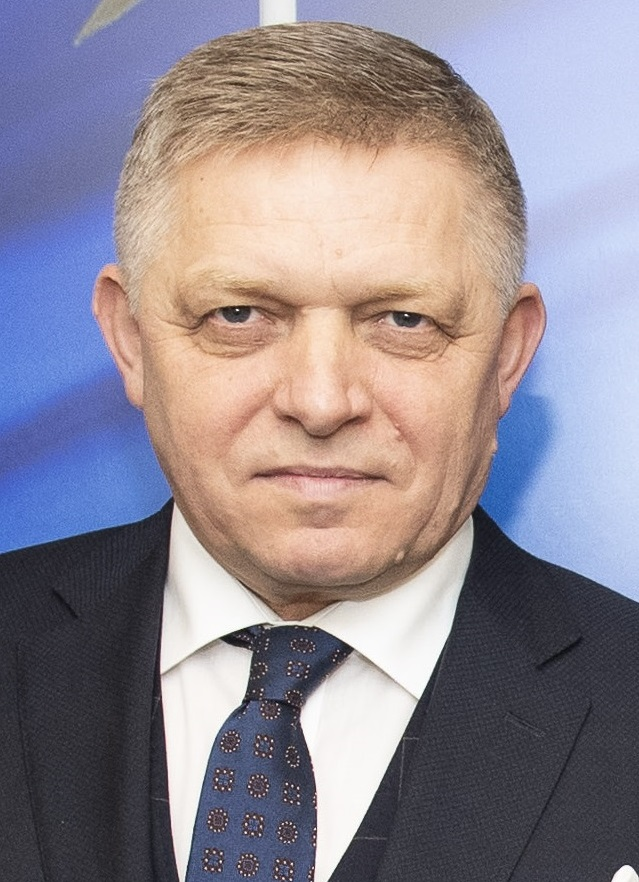
Robert Fico in 2023

The foreign policy of Robert Fico, spanning four mandates as Prime Minister of Slovakia (2006–2010, 2012–2016, 2016–2018, and 2023–present), has evolved from a pragmatic, pro-European integrationist stance into a confrontational doctrine defined as "sovereign Slovak foreign policy".

In his earlier terms, Fico positioned Slovakia within the "core" of the European Union by overseeing the country's entry into the Schengen Area in 2007 and the adoption of the Euro in 2009. During this period, he maintained standard Euro-Atlantic alignments while fostering stable, energy-focused relations with Russia and cooperative regional ties within the Visegrád Group alongside the Czech Republic, Poland, and Hungary.

Since his return to power in 2023, however, his administration has shifted toward a "politics of the four corners of the world," characterized by a vocal skepticism of Western military aid to Ukraine and a push to "normalize" relations with Moscow. This pivot has seen Slovakia strengthen strategic economic partnerships with China, particularly through major green-energy investments, while expanding diplomatic outreach to Global South nations such as Brazil, India, and Vietnam.

While Fico asserts that Slovakia remains anchored in the EU and NATO, his frequent ideological alignment with Hungary's Viktor Orbán and his criticism of Brussels' sanctions have led to significant friction with European allies, marking a transition from institutional reliability to a multi-vector, "Slovakia First" approach.

PM Fico urged the European Union on September 22, 2026, to hold an emergency meeting on rising fuel costs. Moreover, he criticized EU energy policies, including carbon reduction rules, stating that the bloc was not doing enough to protect member countries from the economic impact of high oil prices.

== Africa ==
=== Libya ===
In February 2007, Fico became one of the few European leaders to visit Libya, where he held official talks with Muammar Gaddafi to discuss bilateral cooperation and economic ties. The meeting took place in Gaddafi's Bedouin tent, where Fico spent approximately thirty minutes in private discussion with the leader. During the visit, Fico emphasized the importance of energy security and explored potential deals involving Slovak construction companies and Libyan oil resources. Reports from the trip also noted that, Fico specifically shared interest in the "fight against imperialism".

The meeting drew significant criticism from international human rights organizations and domestic political opponents who questioned the ethics of engaging with Gaddafi's regime. Despite the backlash, Fico defended the diplomatic mission as a pragmatic effort to advance Slovakia's national economic interests and diversify its energy imports.

In later years, particularly during the 2011 Libyan Civil War, Fico maintained a critical stance toward Western military intervention, arguing that the destabilization of the country would lead to increased migration and regional insecurity.

== Americas ==
=== Brazil ===
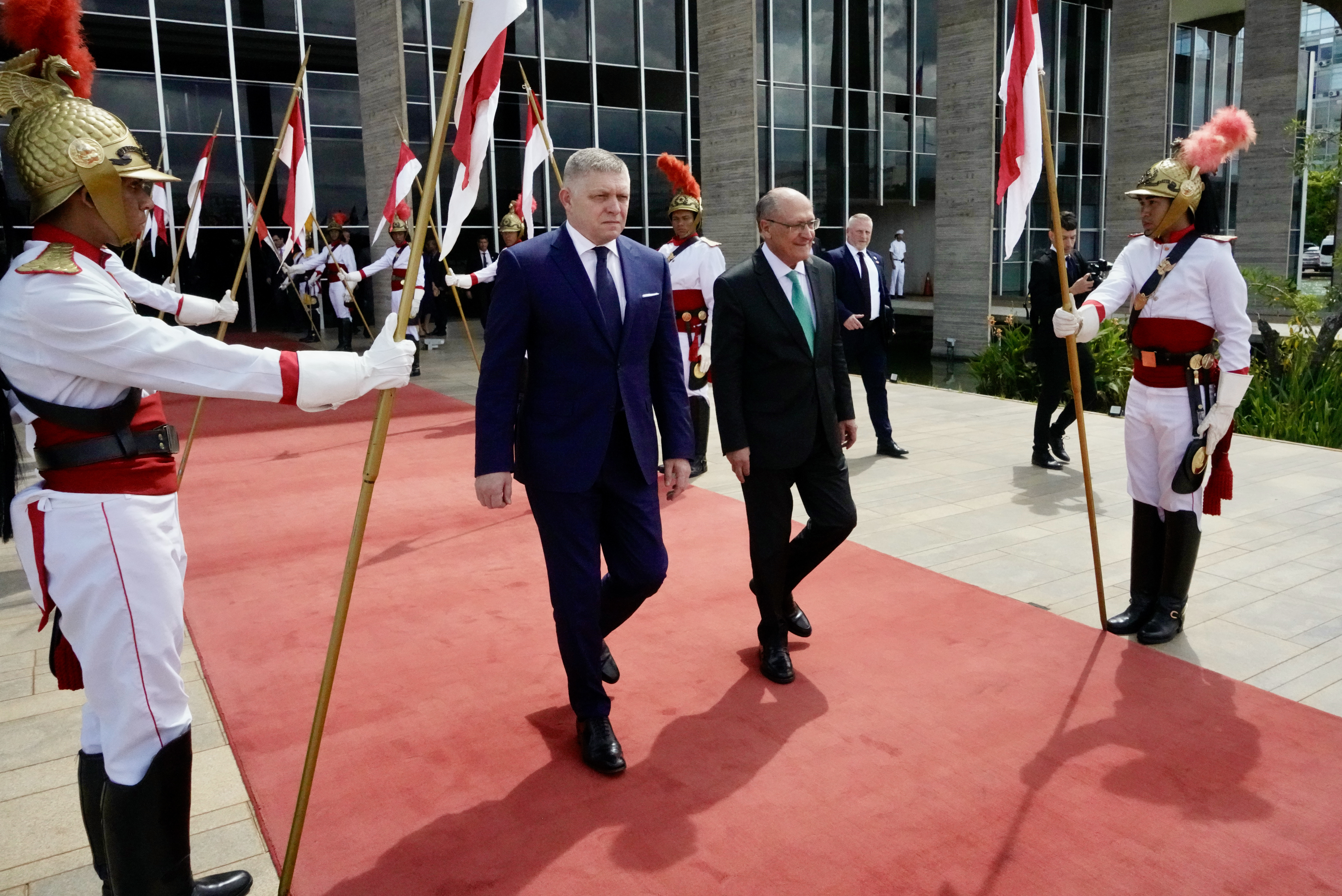
Fico with Vice President of Brazil Geraldo Alckmin, during his official visit to Brazil, December 2024

In December 2024, Fico conducted an official state visit to Brazil, marking the first visit by a Slovak head of government to the country. During the trip, Fico met with Vice President Geraldo Alckmin to sign bilateral agreements concerning defense cooperation, cybersecurity, and the avoidance of double taxation.

The visit also involved discussions on international diplomacy, where Fico expressed support for the Brazil-China "Friends for Peace" initiative regarding the war in Ukraine. Additionally, Slovakia formally joined the Global Alliance Against Hunger and Poverty, a flagship project of Brazil's G20 presidency.

In May 2025, Fico and Brazilian President Luiz Inácio Lula da Silva met in Moscow during the commemorations for the 80th anniversary of Victory Day. The meeting focused on bilateral relations and the potential for a peaceful resolution to the conflict in Ukraine.

=== Cuba ===
In January 2007 and 2008, Fico attended a reception at the Cuban Embassy in Bratislava to mark the anniversary of the Cuban Revolution. He argued that such attendance was a sign of respect for a sovereign nation, stating that "even with countries on whose procedures we may have different views, it is necessary to conduct a dialogue".

In October 2015, during his second term, Fico became the first Slovak Prime Minister to visit the island, where he met with Raúl Castro to sign agreements on debt settlement and energy cooperation.

Fico has been a vocal opponent of the U.S. economic blockade of Cuba, describing it as an ineffective and "senseless" policy. He has consistently argued that "Cuba has never threatened anyone, it has only wanted to live its own life", and that the island should not be punished for its choice of political system. Upon the death of Fidel Castro, Fico praised the leader as a "bearer of courage".

Following his resignation as Prime Minister, Fico traveled to Cuba in October 2018 as a member of the National Council. The visit focused on bilateral economic cooperation, specifically regarding Slovak involvement in the modernization of the Mariel thermal power plant and other energy sector projects.

In January 2026, Fico met with Cuban Vice-Premier Oscar Pérez-Oliva Fraga in Bratislava to discuss deepening economic ties. During the meeting, Fico stated that the Slovak Republic and Cuba are not disturbed by "any unresolved political issues," and that both nations share an interest in developing "friendly and mutually beneficial economic relations in a spirit of mutual respect". Fico stated that a primary goal of his administration is the "more significant involvement of Slovak entrepreneurs in the opportunities created in Cuba by a number of reform measures".

=== United States ===
In November 2013, Fico traveled to Washington, D.C., where he was hosted by U.S. president Barack Obama. The two leaders held talks centered on the long-standing U.S.–Slovak partnership. During the visit, a spokesperson for Prime Minister Fico said the relationship is "firmly rooted in shared democratic values and principles." The meetings served not only to reinforce existing ties but also to underscore mutual commitment to democratic governance and security cooperation. Concluding the highly successful engagement, Prime Minister Fico unequivocally reaffirmed the enduring strategic partnership between Slovakia and the United States.

During Fico's third term, Slovakia initiated the procurement of 14 U.S.-made Lockheed Martin F-16 fighter jets to replace its Soviet MiG-29 fleet. The formal agreement was finalized in late 2018 for approximately €1.6 billion, marking the largest military purchase in the country's history. Following Fico's return to office in 2023, his administration oversaw the delivery of the first aircraft to Slovak soil in July 2024. This acquisition remains a central component of Slovakia's defense strategy and its commitment to NATO technical standards.

In February 2025, Fico was a confirmed speaker at the Conservative Political Action Conference (CPAC) held in National Harbor, Maryland. During his address, Fico endorsed U.S. President Donald Trump. He commended President Trump's "energy in negotiations on Ukraine," stating Trump had taken a constructive approach to seeking an end to the conflict. Fico stated that President Trump was providing a "great service to Europe by bringing the truth" to the continent's current political climate. Fico also said in his speech that Russia had "serious security reasons for the war".

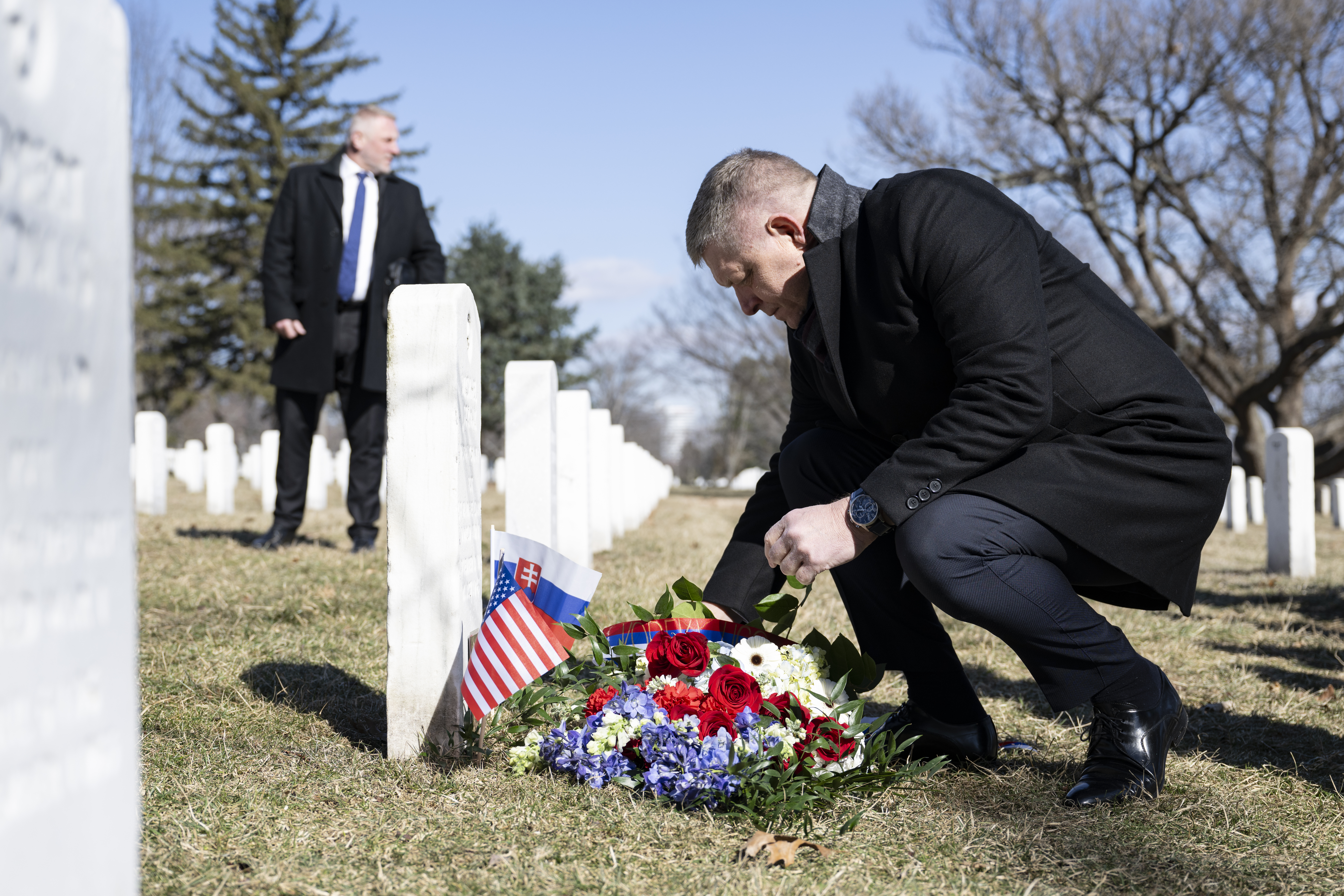
Fico visits the grave of Slovak-born Iwo Jima hero Sgt. Michael Strank, Arlington County, Virginia, February 2025

Fico visited the gravesite of U.S. Marine Corps Sgt. Michael Strank in Arlington National Cemetery on 21 February 2025 to honour a Slovak native who fought and died as an American hero in World War II. Strank was one of the six Iwo Jima flag raisers in the iconic Iwo Jima photograph, and was specifically honored because he was born in the village of Jarabina in present-day Slovakia before immigrating to the U.S. as a child. Fico laid flowers at the gravesite of the Slovak-born American hero, acknowledging the transatlantic military and historical connection.

In January 2026, Fico criticized U.S. intervention in Venezuela, characterizing it as a violation of international law and reflecting the broader decline of the post-World War II global order. He emphasized his strong opposition, stating that he "resolutely rejects" such violations of international norms. Fico drew parallels to his earlier positions on the 2003 invasion of Iraq and Russia’s military intervention in Ukraine.

In January 2026, Fico met with U.S. President Donald Trump at his Mar-a-Lago residence in Palm Beach, Florida to discuss bilateral cooperation and global security. During the visit, the two leaders held talks regarding a major partnership in civil nuclear energy, centered on the construction of a new 1,200-megawatt reactor at the Jaslovské Bohunice Nuclear Power Plant. This project, which involves the U.S. company Westinghouse, is estimated to cost approximately €15 billion, representing the largest infrastructure investment in Slovak history. Fico emphasized that the deal is a milestone for Slovak energy sovereignty and strengthens the strategic economic ties between the two nations.

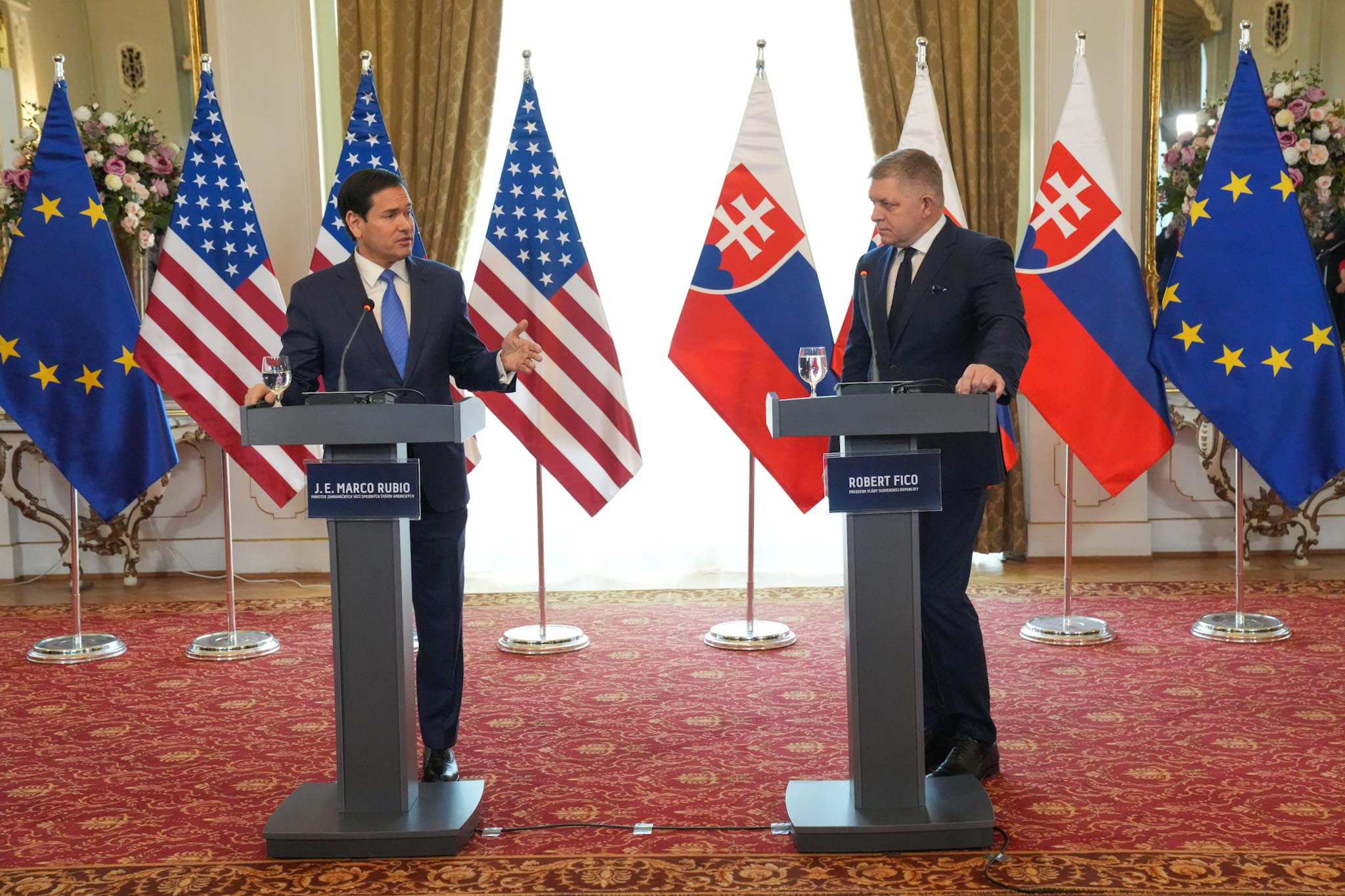
Robert Fico and Marco Rubio during a joint press conference, Bratislava, Slovakia, February 2026

In February 2026, Fico hosted U.S. Secretary of State Marco Rubio in Bratislava. The two leaders discussed the implementation of the Westinghouse nuclear deal and regional security within the framework of the Slovakia–United States strategic partnership. Fico characterized the meeting as a sign of mutual respect, emphasizing that the high-level dialogue underscored a new era of cooperation between the two nations. During a joint press conference, Fico explicitly outlined his "Slovakia first" approach to the partnership, stating that while the two nations are allies, his primary duty is to protect Slovak national interests. He confirmed Slovakia's intent to expand its F-16 procurement from 14 to 18 aircraft to further bolster national defense.

Following the U.S. military strike on Iran, Fico criticized the dominance of great powers, stating that "the big and powerful do as they please, while we, the small, can only watch and grumble".

== Asia ==
=== China ===
Fico has actively pursued closer ties with China, which is Slovakia's largest trading partner outside the European Union. During a November 2024 visit, he and President Xi Jinping agreed to elevate bilateral relations to a strategic partnership and signed 13 cooperation documents. Fico's government supports China's "all-azimuth diplomacy" approach, prioritizing economic cooperation in areas like new energy and infrastructure. He has publicly opposed EU tariffs on China-made electric vehicles, seeking Chinese investment like the Gotion battery plant in Slovakia.

On sensitive political issues, Fico's government consistently adheres to the "one China policy" and, regarding Tibet and human rights, the joint statement from his November 2024 visit opposed the "politicization and instrumentalization of human rights issues" and interference in internal affairs. This stance is consistent with Fico's past actions, such as when he criticized a predecessor for meeting the Dalai Lama.

Fico aligns with China's diplomatic efforts regarding the Ukraine conflict, commending Beijing's position as "fair, objective, and constructive," and publicly expressing Slovakia's readiness to join the China–Brazil "Friends for Peace" initiative.

In September 2025, he was the only leader of an EU member state to take part in the commemorative events marking the 80th anniversary of the Chinese people's victory in the War of Resistance against Japan and the end of World War II in Beijing.

=== India ===
Fico meeting the Prime Minister of India, Narendra Modi, in Bratislava on 15 June 2026

From 14 to 16 June, 2026, Indian prime minister Narendra Modi made an official visit to Slovakia after being invited by Fico. During the trip, Modi met with Fico and Slovak President Peter Pellegrini. The leaders discussed expanding trade, investment, automobile manufacturing, and railway development between the two countries.

=== Israel ===
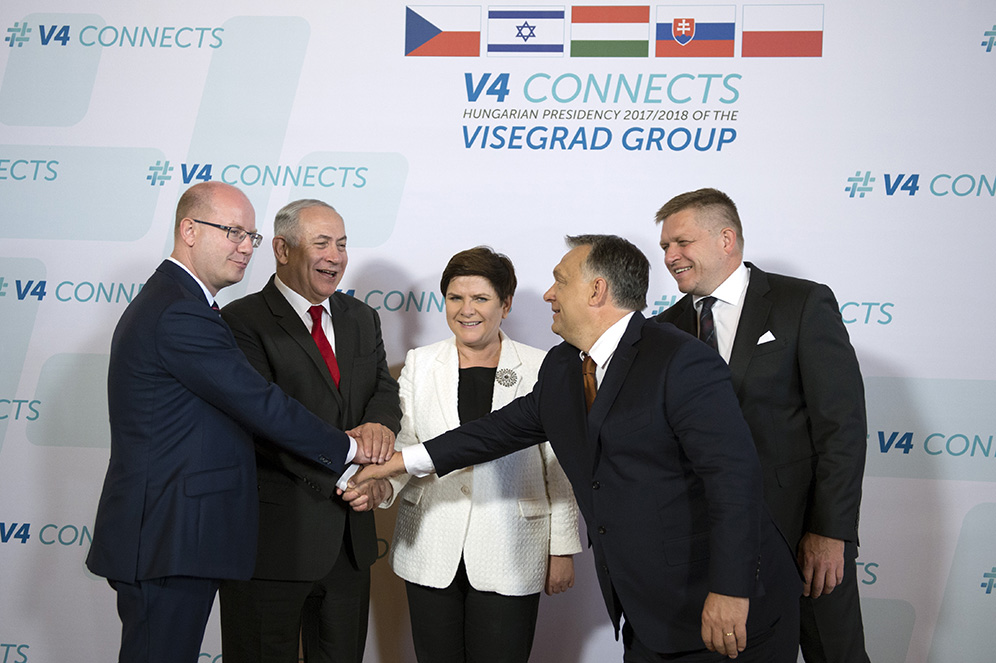
Fico with other Visegrád Group leaders and Israeli prime minister Benjamin Netanyahu at the V4-Israel summit in Budapest, 19 July 2017

Fico has maintained a long-standing and significant diplomatic relationship with Israel, demonstrated through various official actions and meetings. During his 2007 official visit to Israel, Fico met with Prime Minister Ehud Olmert to discuss expanding economic and research cooperation between the two countries. Fico also confirmed Slovakia's readiness to support the imposition of UN sanctions on Iran.

In July 2017, Fico engaged with Prime Minister Benjamin Netanyahu at a Visegrad Four summit in Budapest, where their bilateral discussions centered on deepening cooperation in innovation, the automotive sector, and defense technology.

In October 2023, Fico condemned the Hamas-led attack on Israel but also stated "we cannot tolerate thousands of dead Palestinian civilians, as collateral damage". In December 2023, Fico criticized the European Union's "hypocrisy," claiming that the organization was unwilling to openly discuss the extensive civilian death toll in the Gaza Strip.

Fico, held a telephone conversation with Netanyahu, in June 2025 where he offered diplomatic support and provided insight into Slovakia's policy positions. Specifically, Fico expressed his welcome for the "hard-won ceasefire" that brought an end to the Twelve-Day War between Iran and Israel. He underscored Slovakia's commitment to diplomatic methods, stating clearly that his nation opposes any proposals within the EU to suspend the EU–Israel Association Agreement. Fico justified this stance by emphasizing the necessity of maintaining open communication channels, commenting that shutting down dialogue is unacceptable, citing the situation with the Russian Federation as a negative example. In concluding his statement, Fico affirmed that mutual communication would continue, characterizing the relationship between Slovakia and Israel as "constructive, rooted in our shared history," and notably mentioning the presence of a large Slovak diaspora living in Israel.

=== South Korea ===
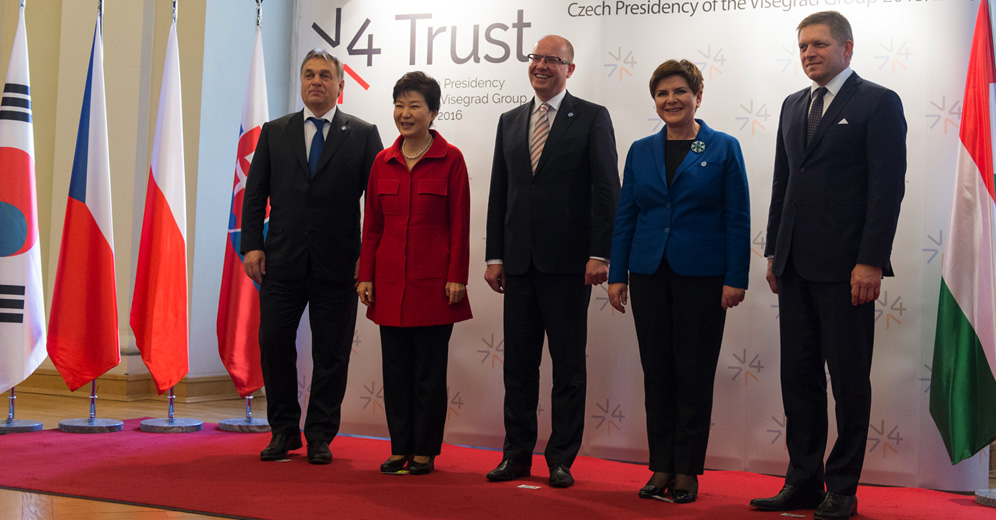
Leaders of the Visegrád Group with Fico and South Korean president Park Geun-hye at the Prague Summit, December 2015

The strategic relationship during the Fico administrations between Slovakia and South Korea is built upon nearly two decades of expanding cooperation, anchored by major economic investment and a deepening focus on energy security.

The relationship's foundation was cemented by the Kia Motors factory in Žilina, with Fico personally attending the Grand Opening Ceremony in April 2007. Reflecting on the investment's significance, Fico declared, "The government and the people of Slovakia will continue to provide full support to Kia's activities and growth in Europe and we look forward to a long and fruitful partnership". This robust economic base quickly led to Fico's first official visit to Seoul later that year, where his primary counterpart was President Roh Moo-hyun. Fico also held talks with Prime Minister Han Duck-soo.

Diplomatic ties broadened in 2015, when Fico, as part of the Visegrád Group, met with President Park Geun-hye to discuss enhanced cooperation, notably including early discussions on nuclear energy collaboration.

Leading up to his second visit, Fico underscored the necessity of the alliance, stating, "South Korea is a country with which we have smooth political relations, it is a country that is an important investor in Slovakia". Consequently, nearly two decades after the initial factory opening, the long-standing political relationship was formally elevated in 2024 when Fico and President Yoon Suk-yeol signed the nations' first strategic partnership agreement on 30 September 2024. This alliance formalizes cooperation across critical sectors like trade, investment, and defense, placing a particular and central emphasis on solidifying collaboration in the nuclear energy sector.

=== United Arab Emirates ===
Robert Fico conducted an official visit to Abu Dhabi on October 20, 2025, where he held talks with UAE President Sheikh Mohamed bin Zayed Al Nahyan regarding trade, renewable energy, and future technologies. During this visit, Fico’s delegation signed a major intergovernmental agreement on economic cooperation and a memorandum of understanding to boost investment ties.

On March 8, 2026, Fico hosted the UAE Deputy Prime Minister and Minister of Foreign Affairs, Sheikh Abdullah bin Zayed Al Nahyan, in Bratislava to discuss security cooperation and regional developments. Fico has specifically invited Emirati investment into Slovak transport infrastructure, identifying the Port of Bratislava as a flagship project for Gulf capital. The Slovak government also seeks to open new markets for its defense industry in the Gulf, viewing the UAE as a strategic gateway for regional trade.

== Europe ==
=== Hungary ===
==== 2000s and 2010s ====
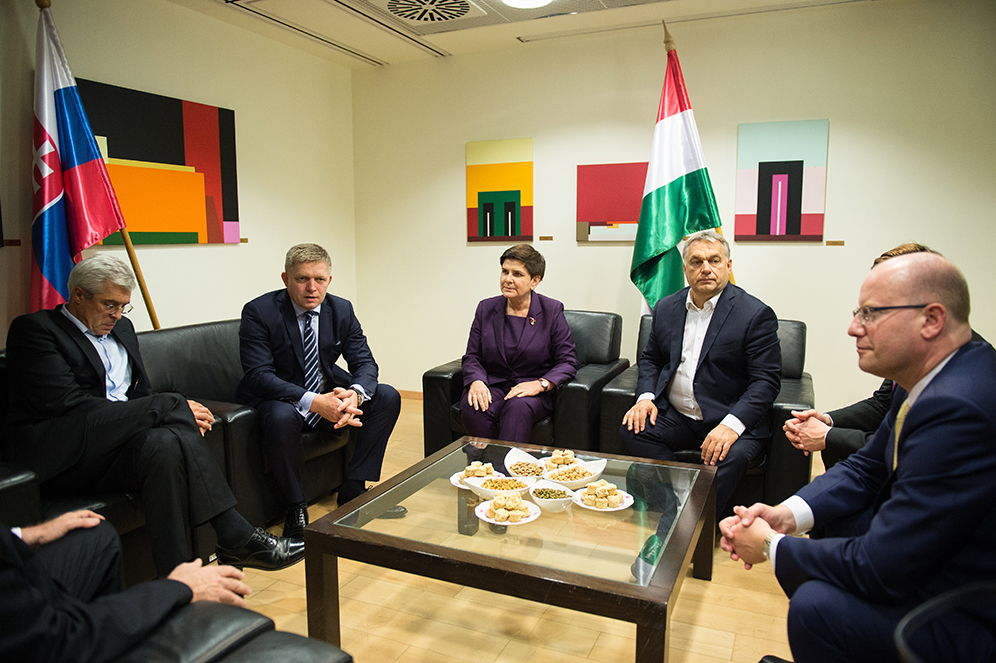
Fico with Hungarian prime minister Viktor Orbán in Brussels, 18 October 2017

The relationship between Slovakia and Hungary during the various governments of Robert Fico has dramatically evolved, shifting from intense diplomatic friction to a close ideological alliance.

This relationship entered a period of severe strain following Fico's 2006 election victory when he included the fiercely nationalist Slovak National Party and its anti-Hungarian leader, Ján Slota, in his governing coalition. In the wake of the election several incidents occurred which further inflamed nationalist sentiment on both sides, including the alleged beating of a Hungarian woman in South Slovakia. Fico reacted by condemning the extremism but rebuked the Hungarian government by declaring, "The Slovak government doesn't need to be called on to strike against extremism."

The first Fico government was responsible for measures that heightened tensions, including a controversial law on the Beneš decrees in 2007 that declared them "inviolable" and unchangeable.

This legislative focus on national identity and sovereignty continued with subsequent controversial acts: The Fico government intensified ethnic friction with the 2009 amendment to the Slovak State Language Act, which was widely criticized for expanding the mandatory use of Slovak in public life and reintroducing fines of up to €5,000 for non-compliance, particularly affecting businesses and public entities in Hungarian-majority areas. This law was a major point of conflict because it was seen as restricting the rights of the Hungarian minority to use their native language in official communications.

Another significant point of conflict was the issue of dual citizenship, specifically the Slovak government's reaction to Hungary's 2010 law that simplified the process for ethnic Hungarians abroad to acquire Hungarian citizenship. In direct response to this, Fico's government swiftly amended the Slovak Citizenship Act in 2010 to impose sanctions, stipulating that any Slovak citizen who voluntarily acquired a foreign citizenship would automatically lose their Slovak citizenship, a move Fico justified due to the perceived "security threat" of potential mass granting of Hungarian citizenship.

During this phase, Fico also openly criticized Hungarian politics, warning about its potential influence and publicly labeling Viktor Orbán's Fidesz party as an "extreme nationalist party" in 2008. Following the initial crisis, relations entered a more pragmatic phase after Fico returned to power in 2012, focusing on economic and practical cross-border cooperation.

==== 2020s ====
A significant reversal occurred by 2022, marking a warming trend as Fico publicly welcomed Orbán's re-election and praised his nationalistic approach. Similarly, Hungarian foreign minister Péter Szijjártó welcomed Fico's return to office in 2023, commenting: "Robert Fico has the same views on the war, migration and gender issues as us". Since Fico's return to office in 2023, the two countries have forged a strong strategic and ideological partnership, characterized by shared opposition to the European Union's stance on migration and military aid to Ukraine. This close alignment has positioned Slovakia as a key ally for Hungary in Brussels, with Fico publicly stating that the "sovereign positions of Hungary and Slovakia would be suitable for a significant strengthening of cooperation within the Visegrad Four".

=== Russia ===
==== 2000s and 2010s ====
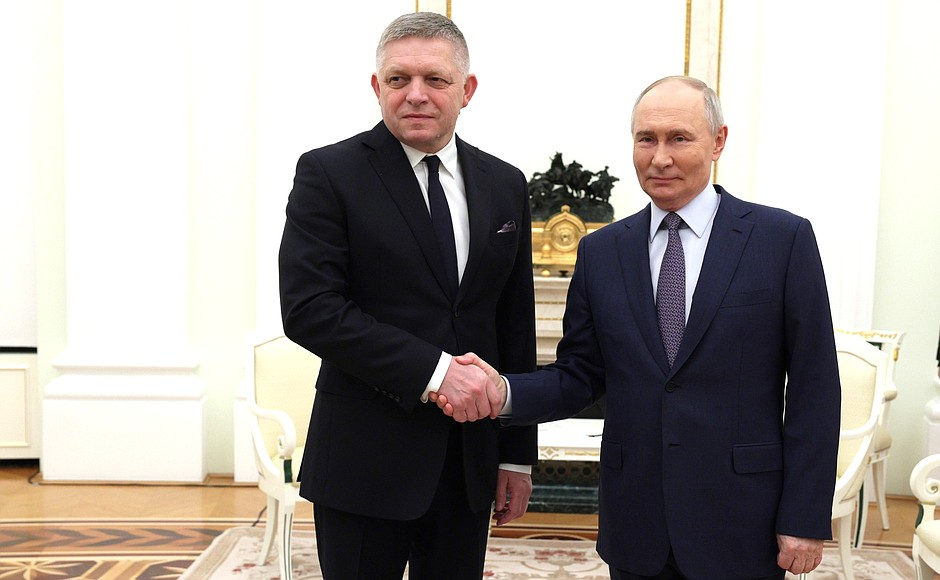
Fico meeting Russian president Vladimir Putin in the Moscow Kremlin, Russia, 22 December 2024

After coming to power in 2006, Fico declared that Slovakia's relations with Russia would improve after eight years of "neglect". This initial period was defined by a strong emphasis on "Slavonic solidarity", a concept with historical roots in the Slovak National Awakening in the 1850s, which Fico explicitly invoked to define the relationship. In April 2008, during a visit by Russian Prime Minister Viktor Zubkov, Fico stated: "In Slovakia, there have been efforts to deliberately ignore Slavonic solidarity". This sentiment translated into defense and foreign policy actions, such as Slovakia choosing to modernise its Russian MiG-29 fighters in Russia rather than purchasing new Western jets. Fico's foreign policy statements often diverged from Western positions, for instance, he accused Georgia of "provoking Russia" in 2008 when Russia invaded Georgia.

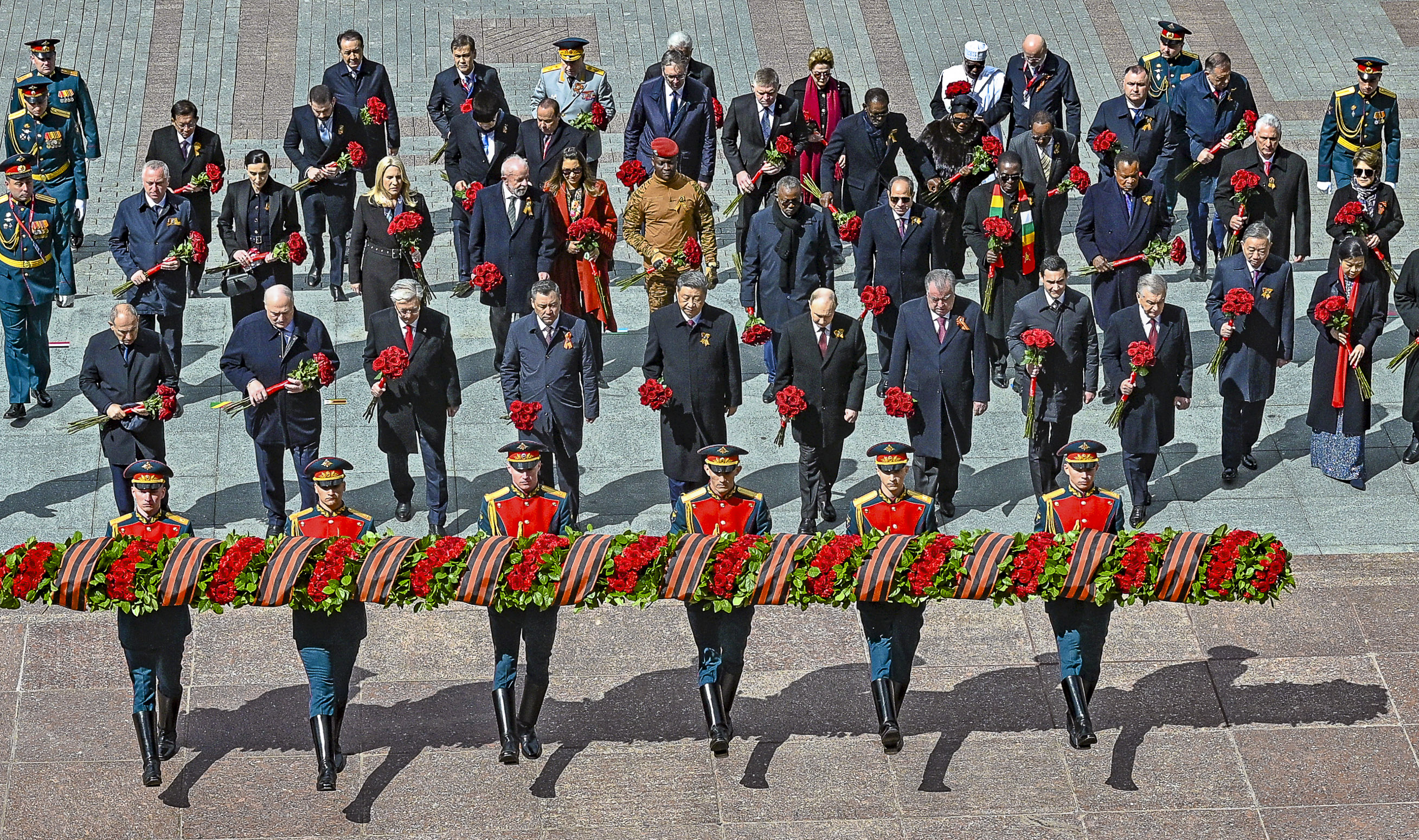
Fico (in the middle of the last row) was the only leader of an EU member state to attend the Russian Victory Day parade in Moscow, Russia, 9 May 2025

Fico made notable visits to Moscow, including his attendance at the Victory Day celebrations in 2015, which was boycotted by most EU leaders following the 2014 annexation of Crimea, he said it was his "moral obligation" to honor Soviet soldiers who liberated Czechoslovakia. He repeatedly criticized the EU's anti-Russian sanctions, calling them "senseless," "ineffective," and "nonsensical" for not changing Russia's behavior and for harming the Slovak economy. Although he declared his opposition to sanctions, he consistently stated he would not "undermine the unity" of the European Union, which meant his government ultimately voted to approve them. His rhetoric frequently positioned Slovakia as a "bridge" between East and West, stressing the need for dialogue over confrontation.

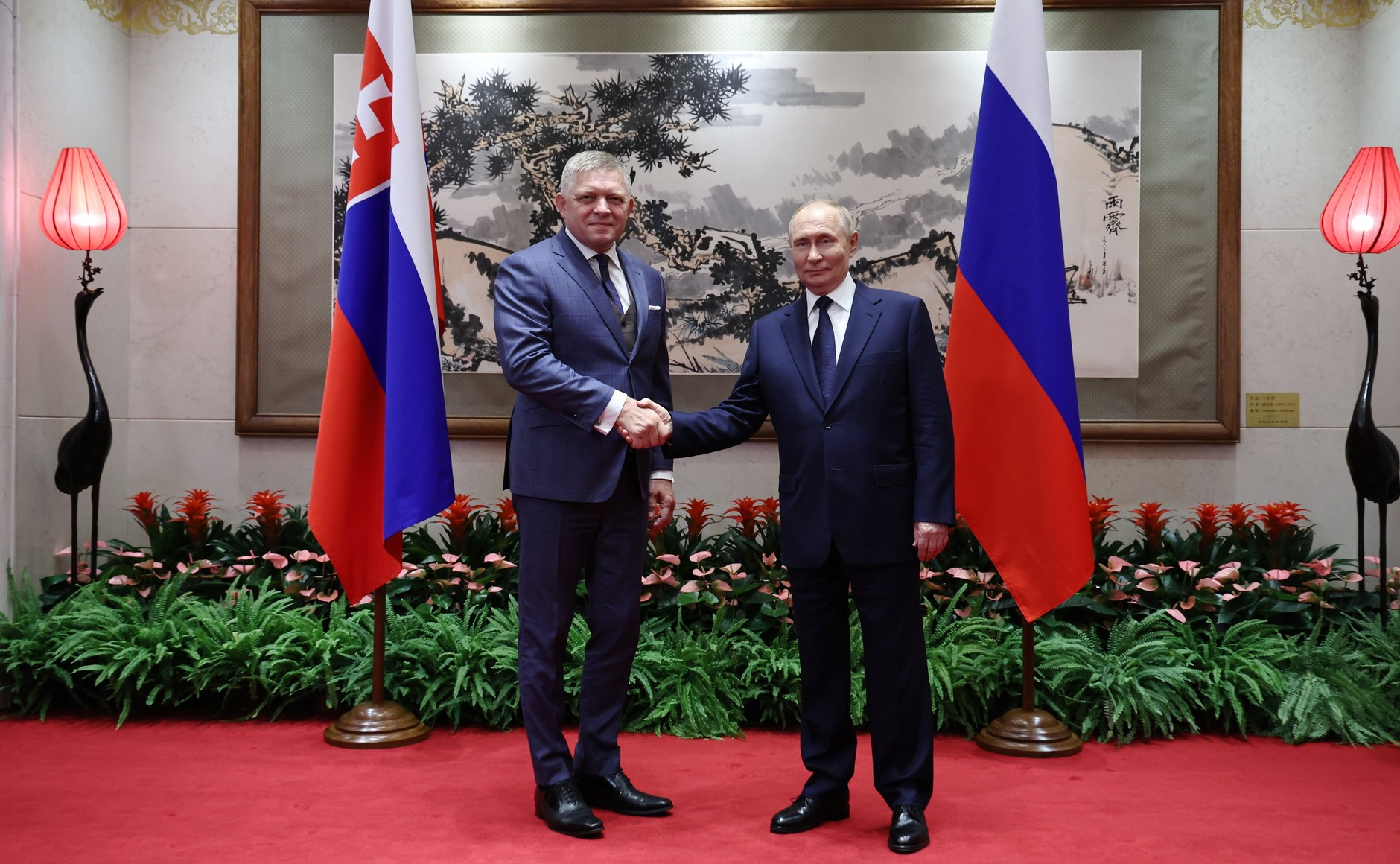
Fico meeting Russian president Vladimir Putin in Beijing, China, 2 September 2025

Fico's attitude toward Russia was characterized by pragmatic economic cooperation. He consistently stated that Slovakia had a national interest in maintaining good working relations with the Russian Federation, especially concerning vital gas and oil supplies. Prior to Russia's full-scale invasion of Ukraine in February 2022, Slovakia was nearly 100% dependent on Russian gas imports, making it one of the most highly reliant countries in the European Union. Furthermore, it was extremely dependent on Russian crude oil, with imports delivered via the Druzhba pipeline consistently accounting for well over 90% of the feedstock processed at the country's sole refinery, Slovnaft. Slovakia was also 100% dependent on Russia for the supply of nuclear fuel for its power plants, which generate over 60% of the nation's electricity.

==== 2020s ====
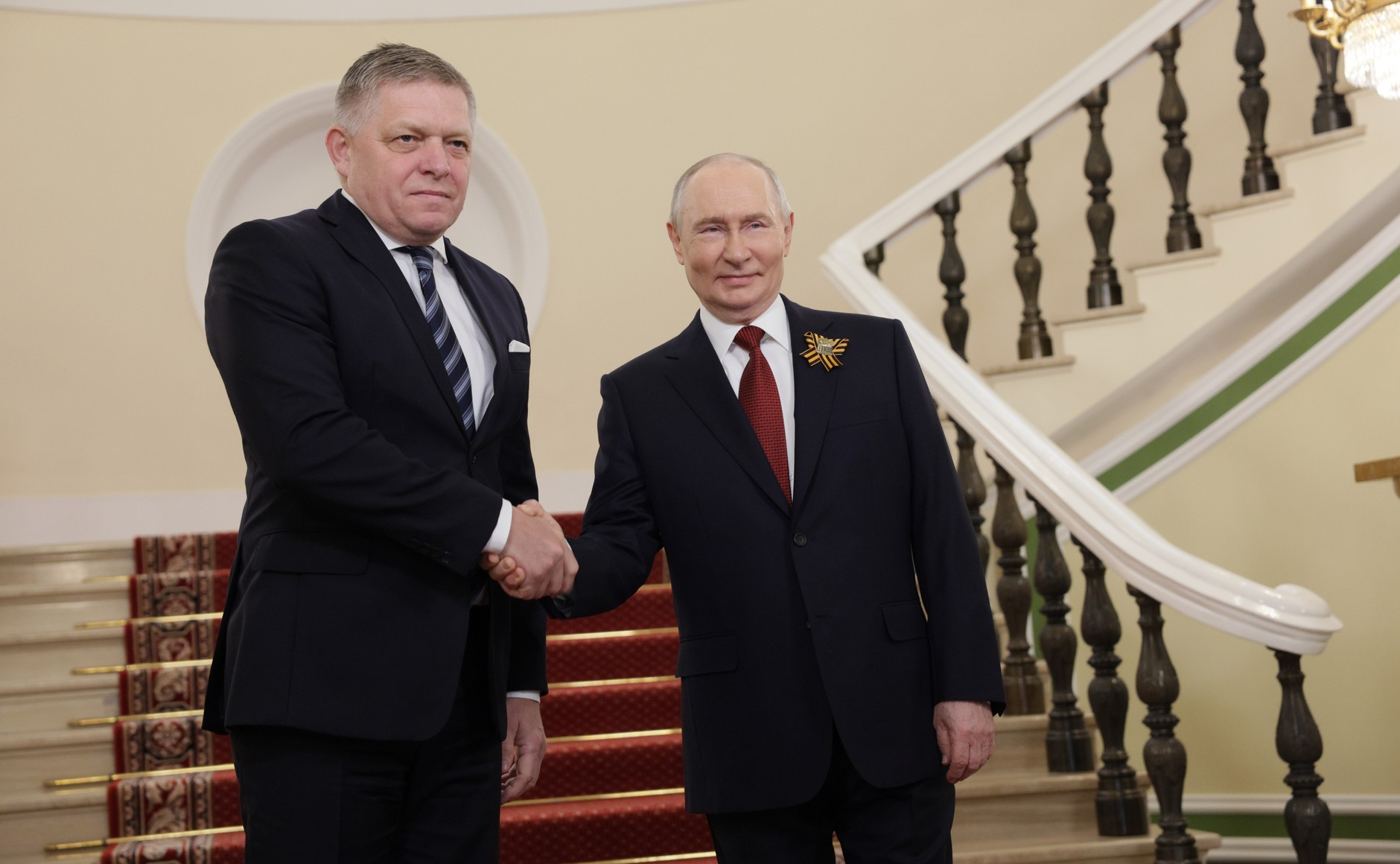
Fico meeting Russian president Vladimir Putin in the Moscow Kremlin, Russia, 9 May 2026

Since 2023, Fico has adopted a significantly more pro-Russian stance compared to his past balancing act, despite having previously condemned the Russian invasion of Ukraine in February 2022, stating the Russian Federation violated international law. Upon taking office, he immediately halted state military aid to Ukraine, claiming that sending weapons only "prolongs the war" and calling for immediate peace talks. He has publicly stated that Russia's military is "unbeatable" and that the West "deceived Russia", directly echoing Kremlin narratives on the conflict's origins. On European sanctions, he threatened to use Slovakia's veto, calling new measures "demagogic and damaging" and only lifting his blockades after securing specific economic concessions from the EU for Slovakia.

Since the Russian invasion of Ukraine, Fico met multiple times with the Russian president Vladimir Putin, first in December 2024 in Moscow, to discuss primarily the transfer of Russian gas to Slovakia, and again in May 2025, as the only leader of an EU member state attended the Russian Victory Day parade. Once again he met with him in September 2025 in Beijing, as the only leader of an EU member state take part in the commemorative events marking the 80th anniversary of the Chinese people's victory in the War of Resistance against Japan and the end of World War II. On 9 May 2026, Fico returned to Moscow to attend the Victory Day parade once again, marking his second consecutive appearance at the event as the only leader of an EU member state. During this visit, Fico described himself as the "black sheep" of the European Union for defending his decision to maintain ties and dialogue with Russia despite criticism from Western partners. These visits were seen as controversial, as they undermined EU unity against Russia's war in Ukraine and contradicted Western efforts to isolate Russia.

=== Ukraine ===
During his previous premierships before 2023, Fico maintained a pragmatic and generally constructive working relationship with his Ukrainian counterparts. Slovakia consistently supported Ukraine's territorial integrity and its European integration aspirations, especially after the 2014 Russian annexation of Crimea and the start of the conflict in Donbas. A major bilateral issue was gas supply: Fico's governments played a crucial role by establishing the reverse gas flow to Ukraine, notably following the 2009 and 2014 Russian gas cutoffs, ensuring Kyiv received vital energy supplies from the West through Slovak pipelines. While maintaining ties with Russia, Fico followed EU sanctions against Moscow, but he also often called for their abolition and openly stated they were ineffective. Official visits and bilateral meetings were routine, focusing on cross-border cooperation, trade, and infrastructure projects, underscoring a commitment to neighborly ties.

==== 2020s ====
The premiership since 2023 marks a fundamental and hostile shift in Fico's relationship with Ukraine and its leadership. Following the 2022 full-scale Russian invasion of Ukraine, Fico adopted a staunchly anti-Ukrainian and pro-Russian political narrative, directly challenging Kyiv and the Western alliance. Upon taking office, he immediately halted state military aid to Ukraine, fulfilling a central campaign promise.

In January 2024, Fico stated that "Ukraine is not an independent and sovereign country and is under the influence of the United States". He has also often questioned the effectiveness of sanctions against Russia and tried to block them within the European Union. His rhetoric includes statements that Ukraine must cede territory to Russia to end the war, a position that Kyiv considers unacceptable and has led to direct friction.

===== NATO =====
Regarding the topic of Ukraine's NATO membership, he said he would not approve Ukraine's accession to NATO while he was prime minister, which is significant since NATO decisions on enlargement require unanimous agreement from all members. Fico said that allowing Ukraine to join the alliance would pose a significant security risk, serving as a "trigger for a World War III". He said he was "very pleased" that Ukraine's NATO membership has been stalled.

===== EU =====
In January 2024, Fico supported the accession of Ukraine to the European Union.

On 5 September 2025, Fico met with Ukrainian president Volodymyr Zelenskyy in the Ukrainian city of Uzhhorod, which is situated close to the Slovak border. During the significant discussion, Fico voiced support for Ukraine's accession to the European Union. He also assured President Zelenskyy that Slovakia supports all initiatives aimed at achieving a ceasefire and lasting peace. However, he simultaneously stated that the two nations have "diametrically opposed views" on energy policy. Fico stressed that Slovakia must pursue energy policies aligned with its sovereign national interests and called for respect for all countries in the energy network, referencing the negative impact of Ukrainian strikes on the Druzhba oil pipeline. Finally, he defended his recent engagement with Russian President Vladimir Putin by stating that "one day the war will end," and normalisation of relations with Russia will become necessary.

During the 2026 Slovak–Ukraine oil dispute, Fico explicitly threatened that Slovakia would withdraw its support for Ukraine's accession to the European Union if the oil flow through the Druzhba pipeline was not immediately restored.

== Alliances ==
=== European Union ===
Fico's relationship with the European Union has changed over his multiple terms as prime minister.

==== 2000s ====
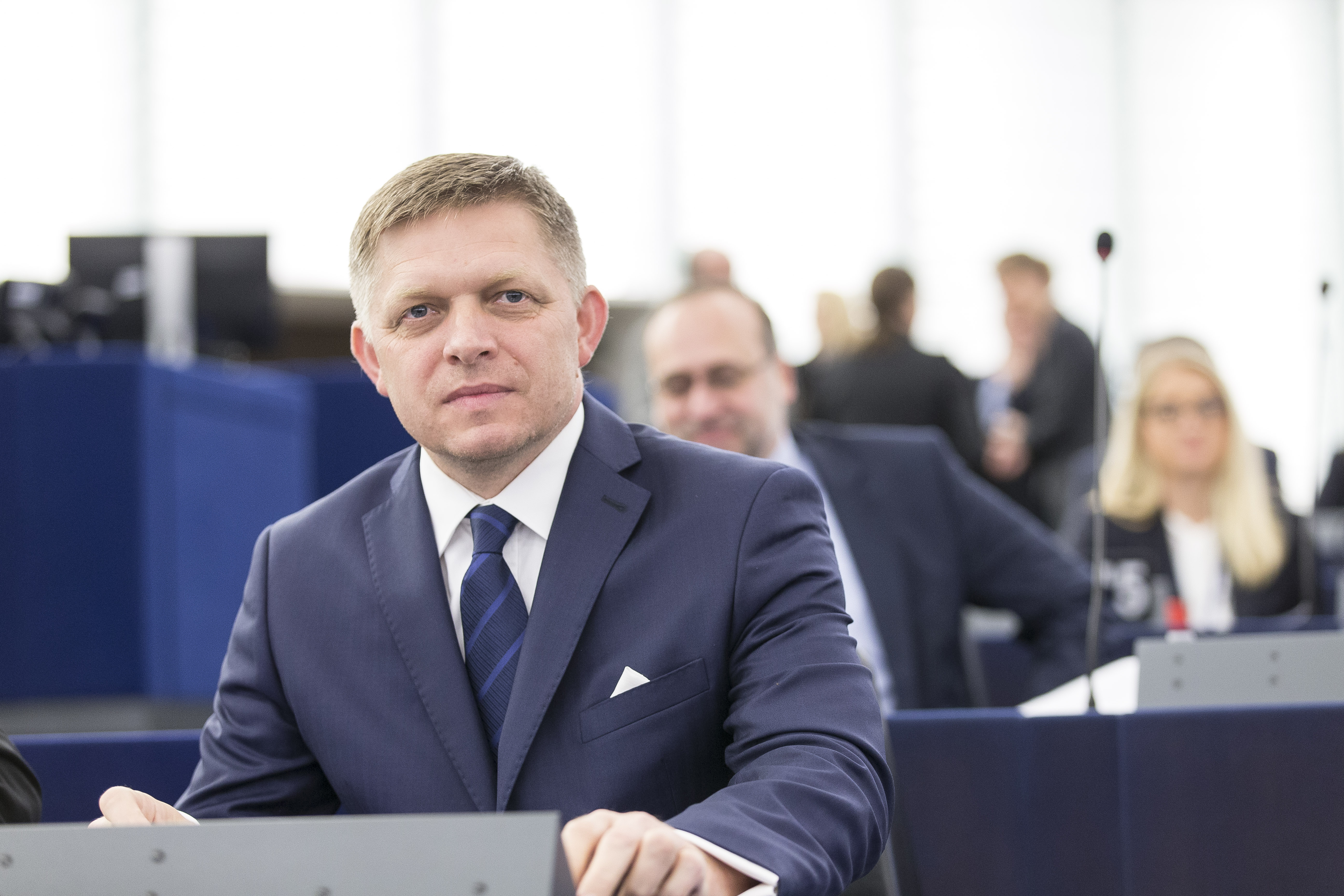
Fico at the European Parliament in Strasbourg, July 2016

During his first premiership, he oversaw key integration steps like joining the Schengen Area in 2007 and Eurozone in 2009, demonstrating a commitment to core EU structures. In a speech to the Oxford Union praised Slovakia's entry into the EU as a "success story".

==== 2010s ====
Fico's Second Cabinet opposed EU migrant quotas since 2015, characterizing the European Union's migration policy as "ritual suicide" if it fails to stop the inflow of migrants and secure its external borders. He has opposed mandatory relocation and, in 2024, declared Slovakia's unwillingness to implement the new EU Migration Pact. He said that the quota system is ineffective, a "dictate," and a security risk.

During his third premiership, he led Slovakia's successful six-month presidency of the Council of the European Union in the latter half of 2016. In this role, he hosted the informal Bratislava Summit in September 2016. In August 2017, Fico said: "The fundamentals of my policy are being close to the (EU) core, close to France, to Germany. I am very much interested in regional cooperation within the Visegrád Four but Slovakia's vital interest is the European Union.

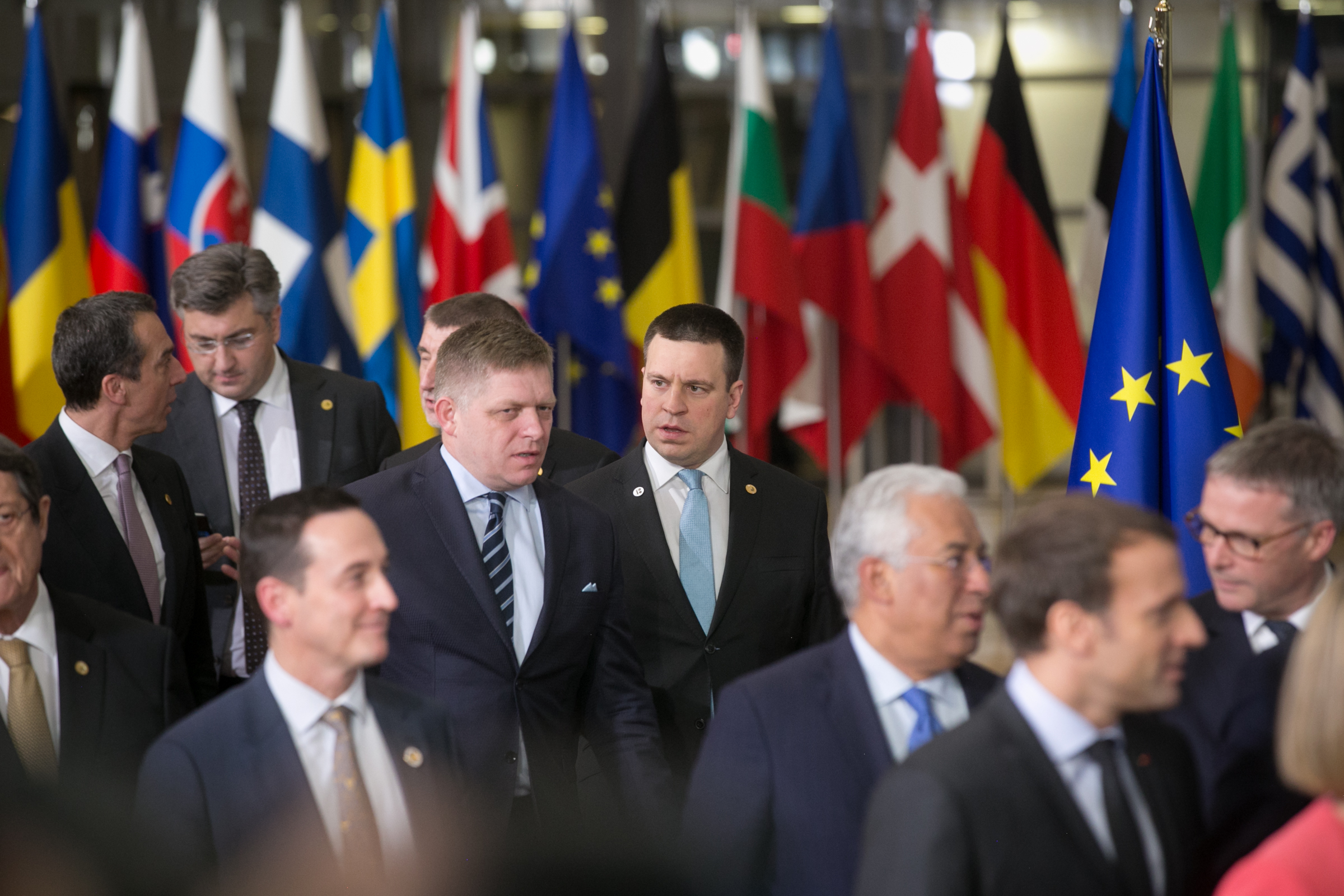
Fico during European Council summit in Brussels, December 2017

==== 2020s ====
During his fourth term, Fico was a critic of the Von der Leyen Commission, describing its foreign and military policies toward the Russian invasion of Ukraine as "madness". He challenged the commission's authority by stating that "Neither members of the Commission nor the president of the European Council can permit themselves to make statements, in the name of the European Union, on which the European Union and the European Council have never agreed."

Fico's political position often includes criticism of Brussels, as he states that his government prioritizes "Slovakia First" and must retain autonomy over its foreign policy. He has further warned that the European Union could break up like the Warsaw Pact, expressing concern that the bloc's practices, such as "suppressing the sovereignty of individual Member States," threaten the entire European project. He said, "If someone had asked me in 1988 if I thought the Warsaw Pact would fall apart within a year, I would have thought they were crazy. And a year later, it suddenly no longer existed".

Fico has frequently condemned the bloc's policy toward Russia, stating that existing sanctions are "ideologically and obsessively anti-Russian". He has also accused the EU of reviving an "Iron Curtain" mentality toward Russia, saying Slovakia will not be a part of it and that he will strive for peaceful cooperation.

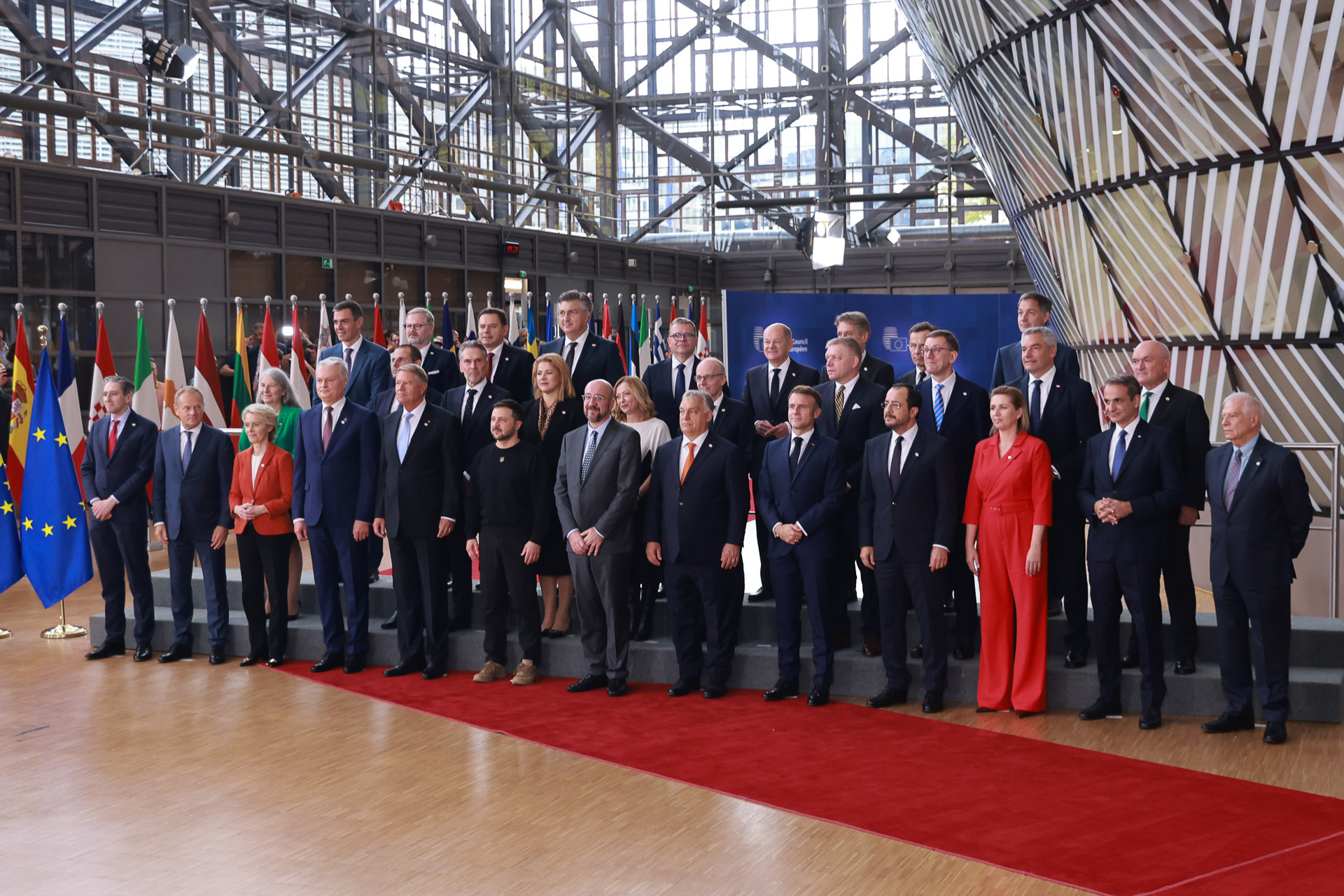
Fico with other European leaders at European Council summit in Brussels, October 2024

Kaja Kallas, the EU's high representative of the union for foreign affairs and security policy and a strong critic of Russia, publicly clashed with Fico in 2025. The dispute centered on Fico's choice to attend the Victory Day parade in Moscow to mark the 80th anniversary of Nazi Germany's defeat, a decision made during Russia's ongoing war against Ukraine. Kallas's had warned EU member states and candidate country leaders not to attend. Fico said Kallas' comment "confirms we need a discussion within the EU about the essence of democracy". Fico said his attendance was a tribute to the Red Army. Kallas said he was on the "wrong side of history".

Fico has criticised the European Union's Green Deal, stating that many of its ambitious climate targets were "unsustainable" and describing it as a "nonsensical dictate" that prioritizes ideology over economic reality. He said that measures like the 2035 ban on combustion engines and the ETS2 mechanism for heating and transport threaten the Slovak economy's vital automotive and heavy industries, making Europe uncompetitive against global rivals like China.

=== NATO ===
Fico's attitude toward NATO is characterized by profound skepticism and a policy trajectory that clashes directly with the alliance's consensus, despite Slovakia's membership.

Fico has openly questioned the value of NATO membership for Slovakia, publicly suggesting that the country would be "very beneficial" as a neutral nation amid the current "nonsensical times of arms buildup". A major point of contention is his sharp criticism of NATO's push for increased defense spending, with Fico calling the proposed financial requirements "absolutely absurd". The requirements refer to the proposal, heavily advocated by U.S. president Donald Trump, to raise defense spending to 5% of GDP by 2035. He framed the issue as a stark choice, suggesting that failing to meet the financial target could force Slovakia to "leave NATO". He specifically compared the alliance to an "expensive golf club", stating that "to play you have to pay a member fee". Furthermore, Fico has used strong rhetoric to criticize the alliance's broader orientation, accusing Western leaders of being "warmongers".

Throughout his political career, Fico doesn't attend any NATO summit; in instances of his non-attendance, Slovakia is officially represented by the president, who, as the head of state, is constitutionally the commander-in-chief of the Slovak Armed Forces. To discuss Slovakia's existing commitments, Fico has met with each NATO secretary general once during his terms as prime minister: with Jaap de Hoop Scheffer in October 2006, with Anders Fogh Rasmussen at NATO headquarters in April 2012, with Jens Stoltenberg at NATO headquarters in December 2023, and with Mark Rutte in Bratislava in November 2025.

=== Visegrád Group ===
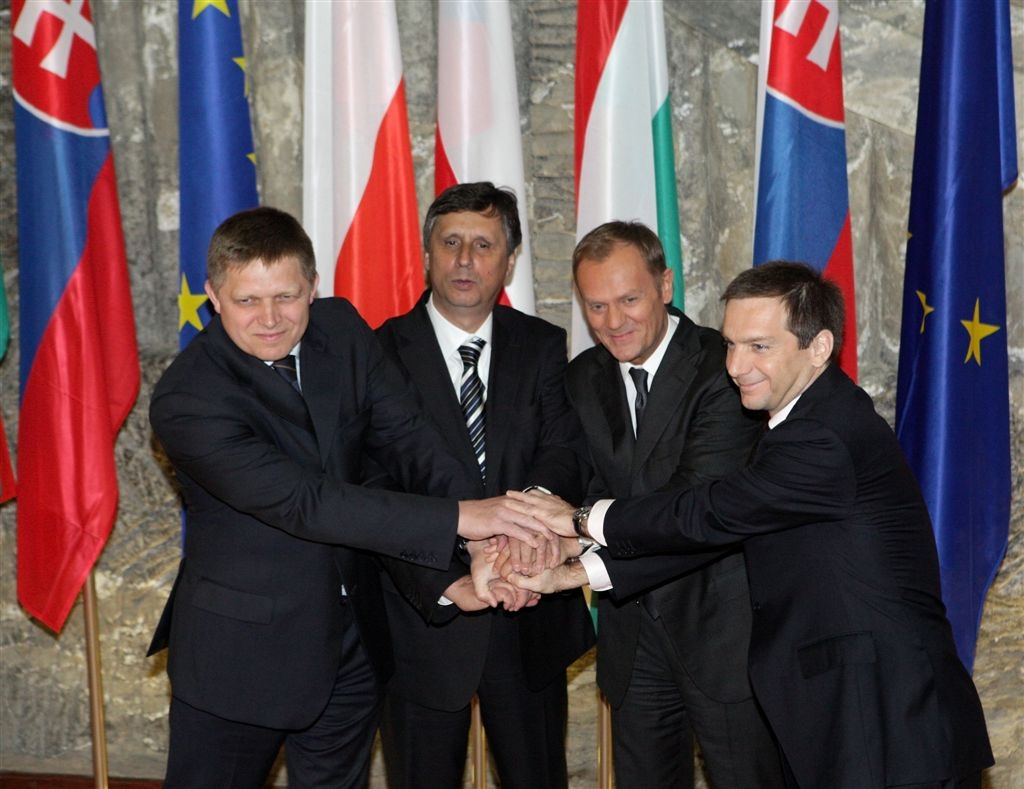
Fico with leaders of Visegrád Group in Kraków, October 2009

Fico consistently places the Visegrád Group (V4), comprising Slovakia, Czech Republic, Hungary, and Poland, at the forefront of his foreign policy priorities, calling it the essential regional format for asserting Central European interests. He champions the V4 as a necessary alliance to achieve a "sovereign Slovak foreign policy" that protects national autonomy against the perceived overreach of Brussels.

Fico sees the V4 cooperation as "destined for success" and crucial for looking for regional solutions where the European Union "unfortunately does not provide such solutions today". He is particularly keen on increasing V4 collaboration on shared sovereign interests like energy security. Furthermore, he seeks strong V4 coordination on illegal migration, where the group maintains a collective and firm opposition to mandatory migrant relocation quotas while advocating for increased EU funding for external border protection.

A key issue successfully elevated to the V4 agenda by Fico administration is the "dual quality of food," where products under the same brand are of different quality in Western versus Central European markets. Fico stated that V4 citizens were being "humiliated" by multinational corporations that offered them products with inferior ingredients, and the V4's collective pressure ultimately led to EU legislation prohibiting this misleading marketing.

== See also ==
- Domestic policy of Robert Fico
