= Korzár =

Regional newspaper in Slovakia

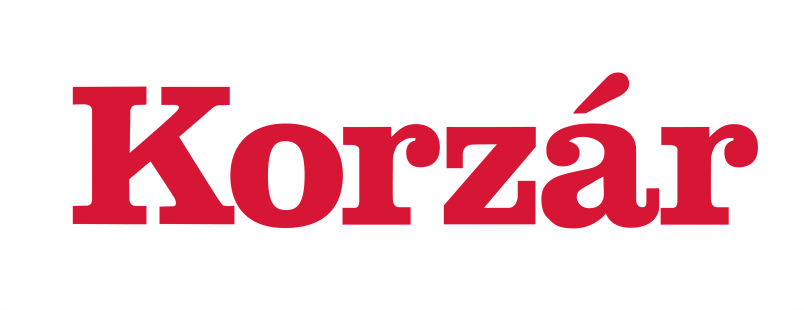
- Type: Daily newspaper
- Format: Tabloid
- Publisher: Petit Press
- Editor-in-chief: Jaroslav Vrábel
- Founded: 1998; 27 years ago
- Political alignment: Right-wing
- Language: Slovak
- Headquarters: Košice
- Sister newspapers: SME; Új Szó
- ISSN: 1335-4418
- Website: korzar.sme.sk

Korzár (English: Corsair) is a regional newspaper published in Košice, Slovakia. The newspaper has been in circulation since 1998.

== History and profile ==
The newspaper was established in 1998 under the name Korzo, later renamed as Korzár. It was published in broadsheet format before switching to the tabloid format.

Korzár is the largest and only regional publication of Slovakia. It covers news on eastern Slovakia and has the highest circulation in the region, with four regional editions. From 1998 until 2016, Peter Bercik was editor-in-chief, after which Jaroslav Vrábeľ succeeded him in the post. The publisher is the Petit Press publishing house, which also publishes SME and Új Szó among others.

Korzár has a right-wing political leaning.

Korzár had a circulation of 33,000 copies in 2003 and 30,000 copies in 2004. The audited circulation of the paper was 27,231 copies in 2008. The paper sold 20,000 copies in 2011 and its circulation was 15,713 copies in 2013. The same latter year, its readership was at 5%.

== See also ==
- List of newspapers in Slovakia
