= The Slovak Spectator =

Slovak English-language newspaper/magazine

- Type: Print & online newspaper/ magazine
- Publisher: Petit Press
- Editor-in-chief: Peter Dlhopolec
- Founded: 1 March 1995; 30 years ago
- Language: English
- Headquarters: Bratislava, Slovakia
- Sister newspapers: Sme, Korzár and various regional MY newspapers
- ISSN: 1335-9843 (print); 1336-0922 (web)
- Website: spectator.sme.sk

The Slovak Spectator is an English-language newspaper/magazine published in Slovakia.

The Slovak Spectator is published by The Rock, s.r.o. and was founded by four Americans: Rick Zednik, Richard Lewis, Eric Koomen and Daniel J. Stoll. Koomen and Stoll are the sole owners among the largest media company in Slovakia, Petit Press, which also owns Sme, Korzár, and various regional MY newspapers.
