= Okrúhle =

- Municipality
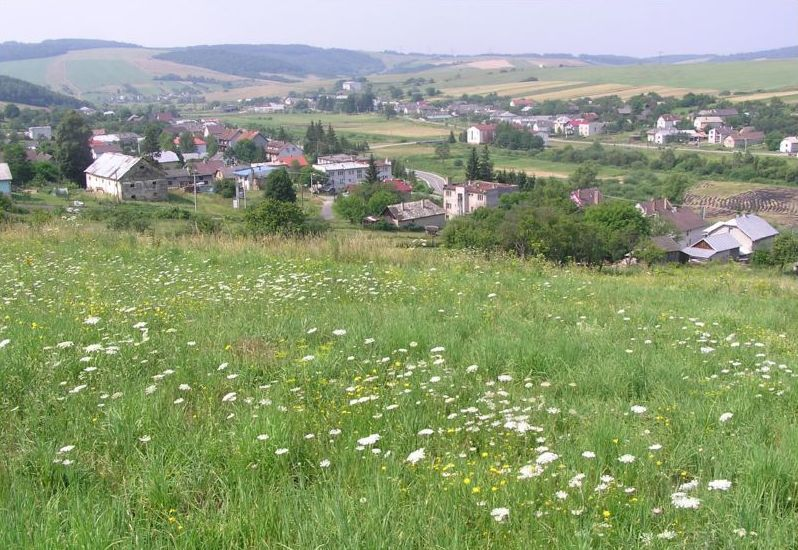

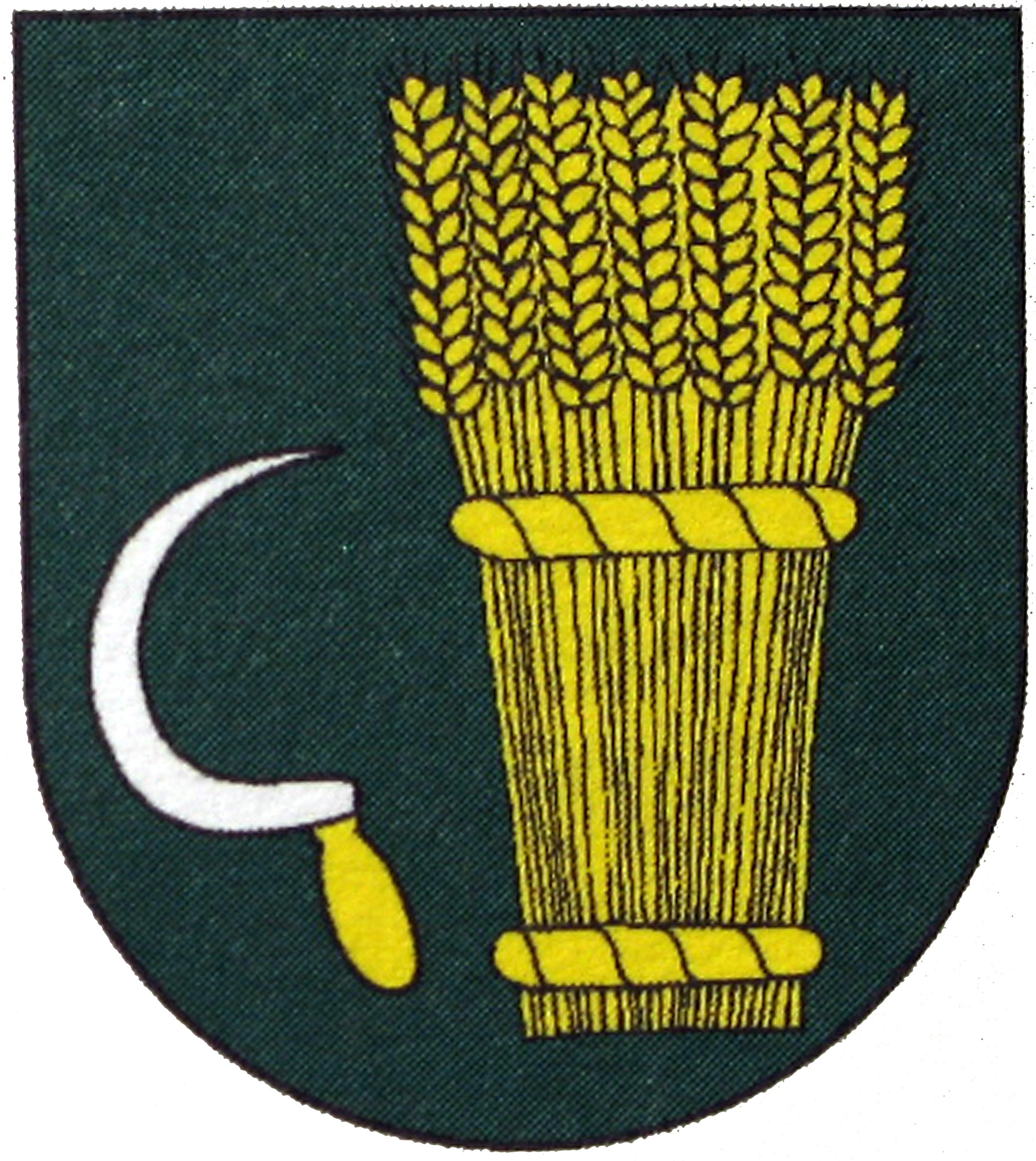
- Flag Coat of arms

- Location of Okrúhle in the Prešov Region Location of Okrúhle in Slovakia
- Coordinates: 49.20°N 21.55°E
- Country: Slovakia
- Region: Prešov Region
- District: Svidník District
- First mentioned: 1414

Area
  - Total: 14.96 km^{2} (5.78 sq mi)
- Elevation: 236 m (774 ft)

Population (2025)
  - Total: 556
- Time zone: UTC+1 (CET)
  - Summer (DST): UTC+2 (CEST)
- Postal code: 904 2
- Area code: +421 54
- Vehicle registration plate (until 2022): SK
- Website: www.obecokruhle.sk

Okrúhle (Hungarian: Kerekrét; Rusyn: Округле) is a village and municipality in Svidník District in the Prešov Region of north-eastern Slovakia.

== History ==
In historical records the village was first mentioned in 1414.

== Geography ==
The municipality lies at an altitude of 236 metres (774 ft) and covers an area of 14.96 km^{2} (5.78 sq mi) (2025).

== Population ==
Population statistic (10 years)
Year	1995	2005	2015	2025
Count	627	642	632	556
Difference		+2.39%	−1.55%	−12.02%

Population statistic
Year	2024	2025
Count	562	556
Difference		−1.06%

It has a population of 556 people (31 December 2025).

=== Ethnicity ===
Census 2021 (1+ %)
Ethnicity	Number	Fraction
Slovak	531	92.5%
Rusyn	34	5.92%
Not found out	33	5.74%
Romani	8	1.39%
Total	574	

In year 2021 was 574 people by ethnicity 531 as Slovak, 34 as Rusyn, 33 as Not found out, 8 as Romani, 2 as Czech and 2 as Other.

Note on population: The difference values of population numbers in the table "Population statistic" and in the sections "Ethnicity" & "Religion" is caused by the use of various statistical methods.

=== Religion ===
Census 2021 (1+ %)
Religion	Number	Fraction
Roman Catholic Church	435	75.78%
Greek Catholic Church	75	13.07%
Not found out	33	5.75%
None	17	2.96%
Eastern Orthodox Church	8	1.39%
Total	574	

In year 2021 was 574 people by religion 435 from Roman Catholic Church, 75 from Greek Catholic Church, 33 from Not found out, 17 from None, 8 from Eastern Orthodox Church, 4 from Evangelical Church, 1 from Other and 1 from Ad hoc movements.
