= Plus jeden deň =

Slovak daily newspaper

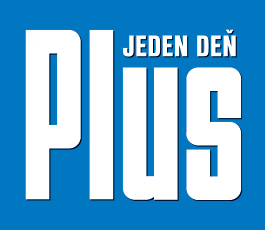
- Type: Daily newspaper
- Owner(s): News and Media Holding
- Founded: September 2006; 19 years ago
- ISSN: 1336-9776
- Website: www.pluska.sk

Plus jeden deň (lit. 'Plus One Day') is a daily newspaper in Slovak published by the company News and Media Holding.

== History ==
The company Spoločnosť 7 Plus was founded in 1990 by three Slovaks. The paper was established in September 2006. It is one of multiple publications by the company for Plus 7 dní, Šarm, and Báječná žena.

On 28 March 2008, Plus jeden deň protested against a law which it said would curb freedom of the press by publishing a paper with its front page blank except for a summary of criticisms of the proposed regulation. The legislation arose out of a European Union treaty and was controversial when proposed in the parliament in Slovakia. When the law passed, the paper again printed a blank front page on 11 April 2008, save for a few lines which stated: "Dear readers, the parliament passed a media law that severely hits press freedom and editorial independence. It aims against the interests of the citizens and readers." The paper criticized that the law, which mandated publication of reader opinions, would flood the media to the point of creating laborious inefficiencies.

== Reception ==
In his book Media Law in Slovakia, author Andrej Školkay called Plus jeden deň part of "the second most important media house" in Slovakia. Peter Barrer wrote in an article for the Journal of New Zealand & Pacific Studies that it was among "Slovakia's foremost print media outlets".

== See also ==
- List of newspapers in Slovakia
- List of Slovak films
- List of Slovak television series
- Telecommunications in Slovakia
