= Sportnet.hr =

Croatian sports news website

- Website type: Sports news
- Available in: Croatian
- Website: sportnet.hr
- Commercial: Yes
- Registration: Required for some services
- Launched: March 2000
- Current status: Online

Sportnet.hr is a Croatian sports news website.

== History and overview ==
It was launched in 2000 and covers sports news from both Croatia and the rest of the world. It is considered the largest and most detailed sports news website in Croatia and the region as well, primarily covering the country's most popular sports such as football, basketball, handball, tennis, water sports and winter sports. Owner is Mariposa Negra.

The site's editor-in-chief is Tomislav Pacak.

In 2000, Vidi declared Sportnet the best Croatian sports website. In 2004, it was among the top 25 Croatian websites. In 2007, Croatian assembly of sports journalists chose Sportnet's columnist and deputy chief editor Bernard Jurišić as the journalist of the year in the Internet journalism category. In 2011, Jurišić's weekly column "Juriš" was named the best column of the year by the same organization.

In March 2010, Sportnet.hr celebrated its 10th anniversary.
