= Új Szó =

Newspaper published in Slovakia

- 9 August 2008 cover page
- Type: Daily newspaper
- Format: print & online
- Owner(s): Vox Nova p.l.c.
- Publisher: Petit Press
- Editor-in-chief: Norbert Molnár
- Founded: 1 December 1948; 76 years ago
- Language: Hungarian
- Headquarters: Bratislava, Slovakia
- Sister newspapers: SME, The Slovak Spectator, Korzár and various regional My noviny newspapers
- Website: ujszo.com

Új Szó (Hungarian pronunciation: [ˈuːj ˈsoː]; English: New Word) is a Hungarian-language daily newspaper published in Bratislava, Slovakia. It also publishes a weekly Sunday supplement titled Vasárnap (English: Sunday, before 1990: Vasárnapi Új Szó).

== History ==
Új Szó was established by a party order on 1 December 1948. It originally started as a weekly magazine of the Hungarian branch of the Communist Party of Slovakia (KSS) first printed on 15 December 1948, but quickly transformed into a daily newspaper which was first printed on 1 May 1949.

The original banner of the newspaper read Workers of the world, unite!, but following a governmental order, it was changed (from 21 May 1951) to "daily newspaper of the Communist Party of Slovakia". The newspaper slowly shifted from hard-line communist doctrine to the point where, during the Prague Spring in 1968, it denied cooperation with the ruling party. Later control of the paper was transferred from the media section of the party to its central committee.

Új Szó was a defended the minority rights of Hungarians in Slovakia, particularly after 1968, and became the target of Slovak nationalists. Later in that year, on October 7, 1968, the newspaper launched a somewhat independent weekly weekend magazine under the name Vasárnapi Új Szó.

During the night of 8–9 March 1987 the headquarters of Új Szó, Csemadok and some other Hungarian organizations' based in Bratislava were attacked and damaged, but no one was injured.

On 14 January 1988, the chief editor József Kiss was elected into the Central Committee of the Communist Party, becoming the first ethnic-Hungarian in that position. On 18 December 1989, Új Szó rehabilitated all of those associates who were fired or excluded on political reasons.

On 2 January 1990, the banner changed to "Czechoslovak Hungarian Leftist newspaper" and on the following day, its publisher changed from the KSS to the Pravda Publishing Company. (Pravda means truth in Slovak) Three days later the weekly weekend magazine of Új Szó shortened its name from Vasárnapi Új Szó to Vasárnap. Later that year, the paper switched to Apollopress Publishing, then to Slovakopress, then to Vox Nova plc (which was established by the editorial guard of the newspaper) and again changed its banner to "independent newspaper". Its editors quickly joined the newly established Czechoslovak Journalists Syndicate's Hungarian subsidiary. The banner has changed twice since, first in 1994 to "Slovak Hungarian daily newspaper" ("Szlovákiai Magyar Napilap") and in July 2008, when it removed all subtitles.

In 1992, 51% of the publishing company Vox Nova was sold to Socpresse to gain financial stability for Új Szó. However Socpresse soon got into financial trouble on its own, and had to sell the (otherwise profitable) paper to Rheinische Allgemeine Verlag und Druckerei (publisher of Lidové noviny, Rheinische Post and various other newspapers) in 1996. They soon grew their ownership to 90% in Vox Nova, before selling it, in 1999, to Passauer Verlagsgruppe, which fused with Grande Presse in 2001 to form the current (as of June 2008) publishing company, Petit Press, and thus Új Szó became "sisters" with various regional and nationwide Slovak newspapers, most notably with SME and The Slovak Spectator.

Vasárnap was the weekend subsidiary of Új Szó until 2001 when the two became fully separated. Until 2001 both newspapers had the same chief editor.

Meanwhile, the online version of the newspaper had launched too, first at ujszo.sk, which now redirects to the current website, ujszo.com. Both the online and print version of the newspaper underwent a redesign in July 2008, and the banner of the online edition was replaced by the newspaper's which was also somewhat redesigned.

Új Szó online's former banner (2001-2008)

The newspaper is a member of MIDAS (European Association of Daily Newspapers in Minority and Regional Languages).
