= Nový čas =

Slovak newspaper

Nový Čas
- Type: Daily newspaper
- Format: Tabloid
- Publisher: Ringier Slovakia a.s.
- Editor-in-chief: Júlia Kováčová
- Language: Slovak
- Headquarters: Bratislava, Slovakia
- Circulation: 98,815 (June 2014)
- Website: www.cas.sk

Nový Čas (lit. 'New Time') is a Slovak tabloid.

== History ==
Nový Čas is owned and published by Ringier Axel Springer Media AG, a Swiss company based in Zürich. The former owner of the paper was Gruner + Jahr. It has an unclear ownership structure as of now, but is said to bought by the company FPD Media and owned by Cypriot Alexandros Oikonomou according to public records.

The circulation of Nový Čas was 121,700 copies in 2012 and 98,815 copies in June 2014. In 2015, the circulation was 130,000 units (Monday–Saturday) and 76,000 units were sold.

Since September 2016, Publishing House has been the regional sales representative of Mafra Slovakia, which was bought by former Prime Minister of Czech Republic Andrej Babiš.

The portfolio of printed newspapers being sold was subject to the approval of competent merger control authorities. As of 31 July 2018, the transaction was completed and concluded, which Ringier also completed the sale of its printed magazines into the hands of News and Media Holding.
