= Hospodárske noviny =

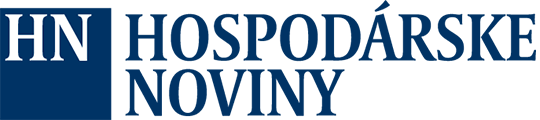
- Type: Daily newspaper
- Format: Broadsheet
- Owner: Mafra Slovakia
- Publisher: Eco Press
- Founded: 1993; 33 years ago
- Political alignment: Conservative
- Language: Slovak
- Headquarters: Bratislava
- Circulation: 17,000 (2011)
- Website: www.hnonline.sk

Hospodárske noviny (lit. 'Economic Newspaper') is a daily economic newspaper published in Slovakia. It is owned by Mafra Slovakia, a media company based in Bratislava, Slovakia.

== History ==
Hospodárske noviny was established in 1993 and is based in Bratislava. The paper is issued by Eco Press, a subsidiary of German-American firm Economia and a member of the Handelsblatt group. It is a business newspaper which has a liberal economical stance. Hospodárske noviny is published in broadsheet format. The circulation of the paper was 17,300 copies in 2010. Its readership was at 3% in 2013.
