= Sme =

Slovak newspaper

SME
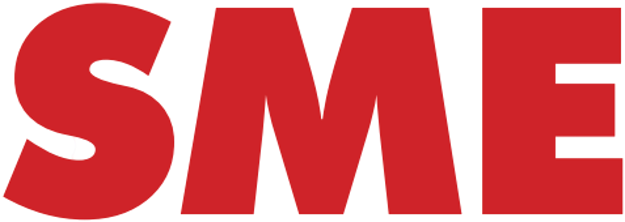
- Type: Daily newspaper
- Publisher: Petit Press
- Founded: 15 January 1993; 33 years ago
- Political alignment: Liberalism
- Language: Slovak
- Headquarters: Bratislava, Slovakia
- Circulation: 32,853 (January 2015)
- Sister newspapers: The Slovak Spectator, Új Szó, Korzár and various regional My noviny newspapers
- Website: www.sme.sk

Sme (stylized as SME) or Denník Sme (lit. 'We Are Daily') is one of the widely-read mainstream broadsheets in Slovakia. Its website is one of the most-visited internet portals in Slovakia.

== Ownership status ==
In June 2016, the Antimonopoly Office approved the transaction of the investment group Penta. At the end of 2017, represented by the company News and Media Holding, Penta decreased to 40% after the latter company sold a five percent share in the share capital to the majority owner Prvá slovenská investičná skupina. The transaction of Penta financial group was announced on 22 April 2021.

== History ==
Founded in mid-January 1993, Sme is published six times a week by Petit Press. The sister newspapers of SME include The Slovak Spectator, Új Szó, Korzár and various regional My noviny newspapers

Its circulation was 76,590 copies in December 2006, 53,000 in 2011, 62,890 copies in September 2012, and 32,853 in January 2015

In 2014, Namav, a subject subvenced by the Penta Investments group, announced the purchase of Petit Press, the publisher of the newspaper. In reaction, a major part of the editorial board, including the editor-in-chief, announced their resignation. Matúš Kostolný, the departing editor-in-chief, stated: "We are leaving SME and we will try to create a new medium that no one will suspect that it serves someone other than the readers".

Six years after the takeover, Penta Investments group left Petit Press in 2021.
