= Outline of Slovakia =

Landlocked country in Central Europe

The Flag of Slovakia

The Coat of arms of Slovakia

The location of Slovakia

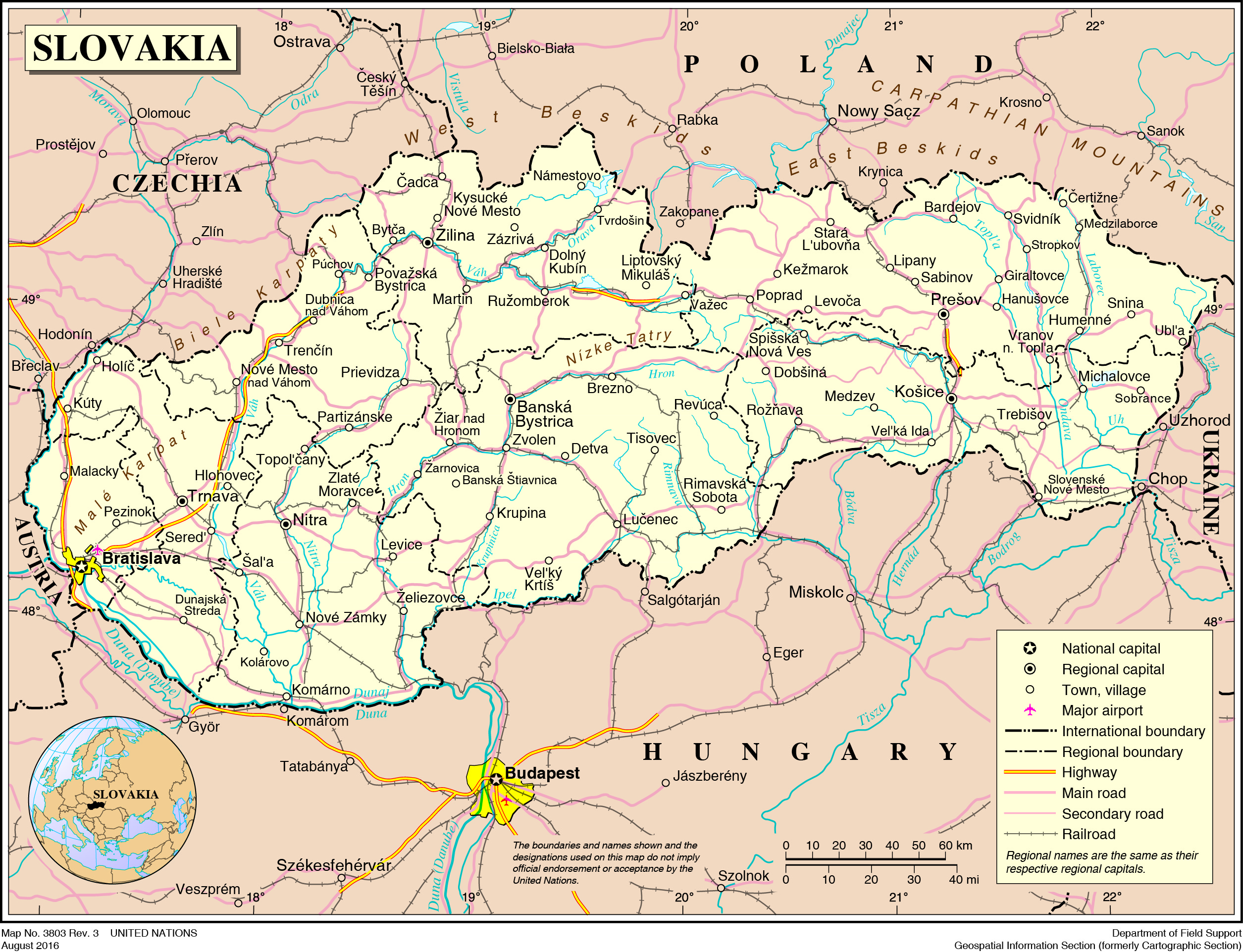
An enlargeable map of the Slovak Republic

The following outline is provided as an overview of and topical guide to Slovakia:

Slovakia – landlocked sovereign country located in Central Europe. Slovakia has a population of five and a half million and an area of 49,036 square kilometres (18,933 mi^{2}). Slovakia borders the Czech Republic and Austria to the west, Poland to the north, Ukraine to the east and Hungary to the south. The capital Bratislava is its largest city. It is a member of the European Union, NATO, OECD and Visegrád Group.

== General reference ==
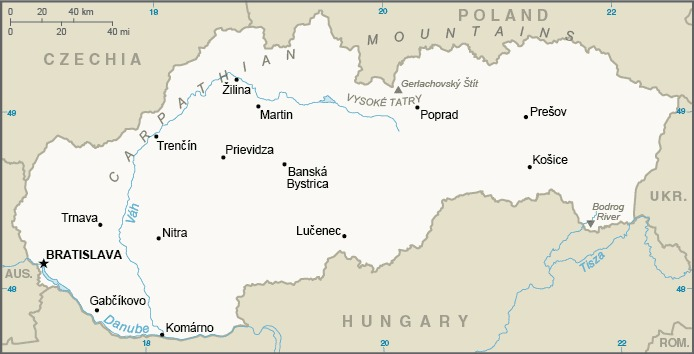
An enlargeable basic map of Slovakia

- Pronunciation:
- Common English country name: Slovakia
- Official English country name: The Slovak Republic
- Common endonym(s): Slovensko
- Official endonym(s): Slovenská republika
- Adjectival(s): Slovak
- Demonym(s): Slovaks
- Etymology: Name of Slovakia
- International rankings of Slovakia
- ISO country codes: SK, SVK, 703
- ISO region codes: See ISO 3166-2:SK
- Internet country code top-level domain: .sk

== Geography of Slovakia ==
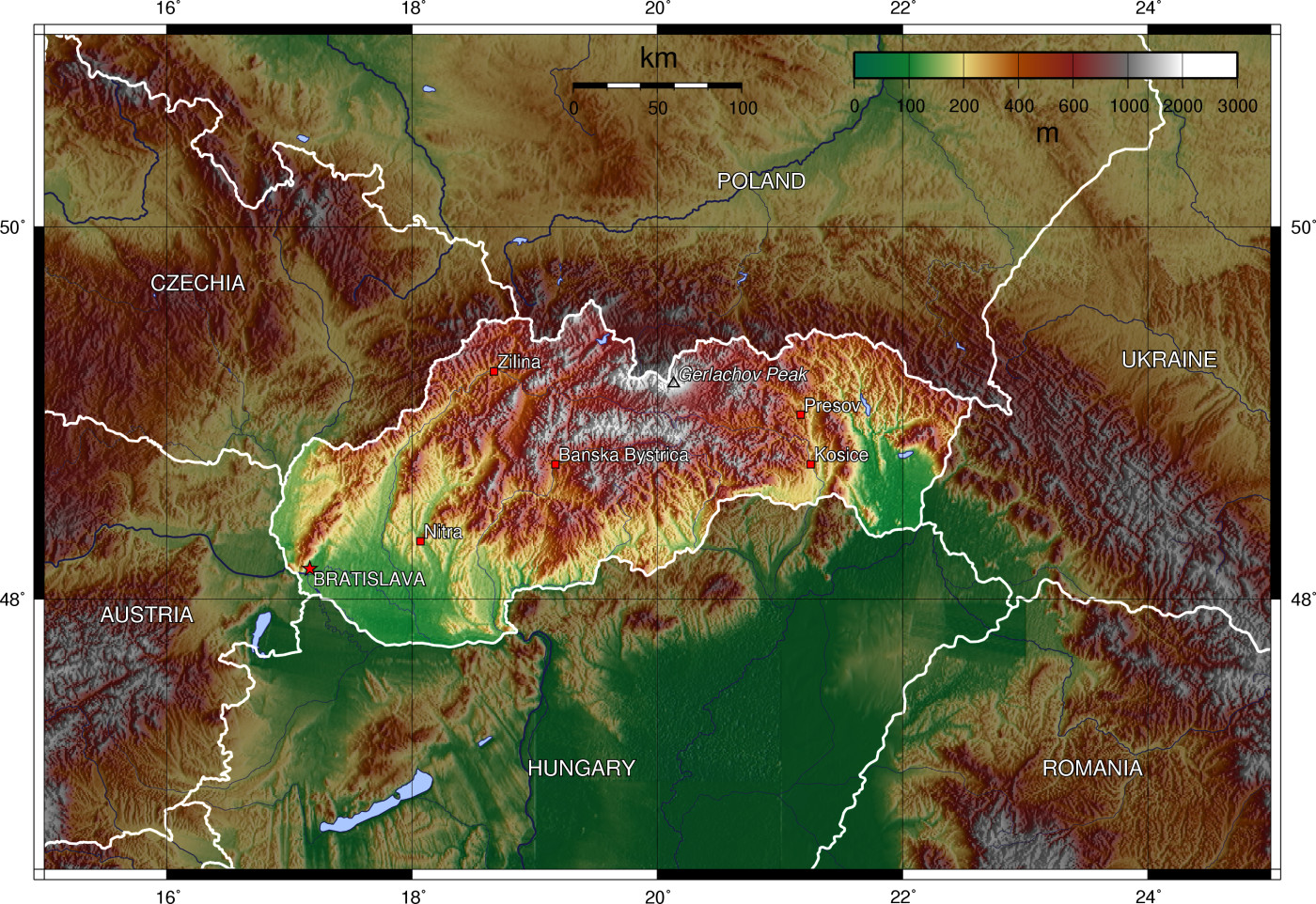
An enlargeable topographic map of Slovakia

- Slovakia is: a landlocked country
- Location:
  - Northern Hemisphere and Eastern Hemisphere
  - Eurasia
    - Europe
      - Central Europe
  - Time zone: Central European Time (UTC+01), Central European Summer Time (UTC+02)
  - Extreme points of Slovakia
    - High: Gerlachovský štít 2,655 m (8,711 ft)
    - Low: Bodrog 94 m (308 ft)
  - Land boundaries: 1,474 km

Hungary 676 km
Poland 420 km
Czech Republic 197 km
Austria 91 km
Ukraine 90 km

- Coastline: none

- Population of Slovakia: 5,404,784 (June 30, 2008) - 109th most populous country
- Area of Slovakia: 49,036 km^{2}
- Atlas of Slovakia

=== Environment of Slovakia ===
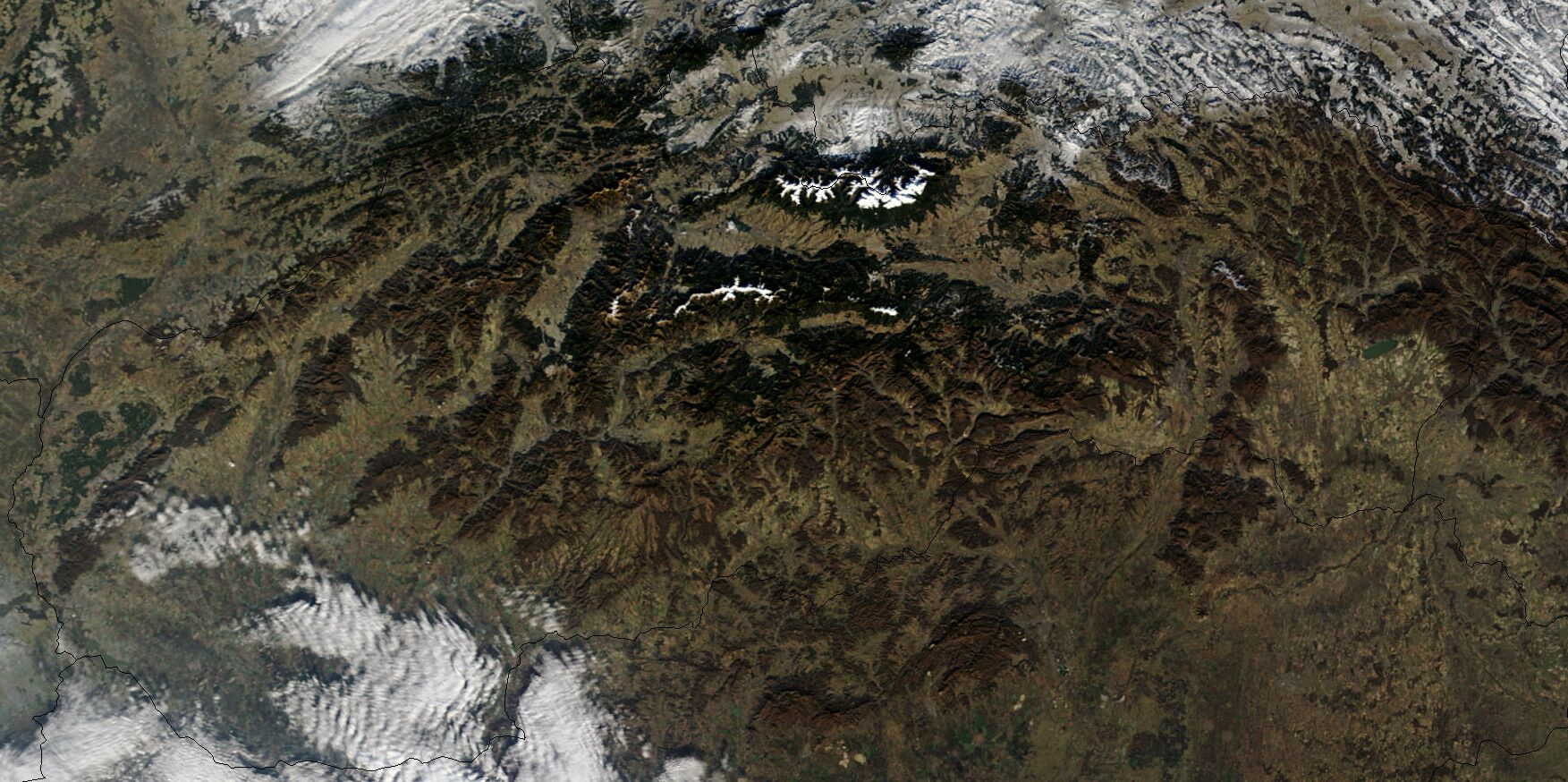
An enlargeable satellite image of Slovakia

- Climate of Slovakia
- Renewable energy in Slovakia
- Geology of Slovakia
- Protected areas of Slovakia
  - Biosphere reserves in Slovakia
  - National parks of Slovakia
- Wildlife of Slovakia
  - Fauna of Slovakia
    - Birds of Slovakia
    - Mammals of Slovakia

==== Natural geographic features of Slovakia ====
- Glaciers of Slovakia
- Islands of Slovakia
- Lakes of Slovakia
- Mountains of Slovakia
  - Volcanoes in Slovakia
- Rivers of Slovakia
  - Waterfalls of Slovakia
- Valleys of Slovakia
- World Heritage Sites in Slovakia

=== Regions of Slovakia ===
==== Ecoregions of Slovakia ====
List of ecoregions in Slovakia

- Ecoregions in Slovakia

==== Administrative divisions of Slovakia ====
Administrative divisions of Slovakia

- Regions of Slovakia
  - Districts of Slovakia

===== Regions of Slovakia =====
Regions of Slovakia

===== Districts of Slovakia =====
Districts of Slovakia

=== Demography of Slovakia ===
Demographics of Slovakia

== Government and politics of Slovakia ==
Politics of Slovakia

- Form of government: parliamentary representative democratic republic
- Capital of Slovakia: Bratislava
- Elections in Slovakia
- Political parties in Slovakia
- Political scandals of Slovakia

=== Branches of the government of Slovakia ===
Government of Slovakia

==== Executive branch of the government of Slovakia ====
- Head of state: President of Slovakia,
- Head of government: Prime Minister of Slovakia,
- Cabinet of Slovakia

==== Legislative branch of the government of Slovakia ====
- Parliament of Slovakia (unicameral)

==== Judicial branch of the government of Slovakia ====
Court system of Slovakia

- Supreme Court of Slovakia
- Constitutional Court of Slovakia

=== Foreign relations of Slovakia ===
Foreign relations of Slovakia

- Diplomatic missions in Slovakia
- Diplomatic missions of Slovakia

==== International organization membership ====
The Slovak Republic is a member of:

- Australia Group
- Bank for International Settlements (BIS)
- Black Sea Economic Cooperation Zone (BSEC) (observer)
- Central European Initiative (CEI)
- Confederation of European Paper Industries (CEPI)
- Council of Europe (CE)
- Council of the Baltic Sea States (CBSS) (observer)
- Euro-Atlantic Partnership Council (EAPC)
- European Bank for Reconstruction and Development (EBRD)
- European Investment Bank (EIB)
- European Organization for Nuclear Research (CERN)
- European Union (EU)
- Food and Agriculture Organization (FAO)
- International Atomic Energy Agency (IAEA)
- International Bank for Reconstruction and Development (IBRD)
- International Chamber of Commerce (ICC)
- International Civil Aviation Organization (ICAO)
- International Criminal Court (ICCt)
- International Criminal Police Organization (Interpol)
- International Development Association (IDA)
- International Energy Agency (IEA)
- International Federation of Red Cross and Red Crescent Societies (IFRCS)
- International Finance Corporation (IFC)
- International Labour Organization (ILO)
- International Maritime Organization (IMO)
- International Mobile Satellite Organization (IMSO)
- International Monetary Fund (IMF)
- International Olympic Committee (IOC)
- International Organization for Migration (IOM)
- International Organization for Standardization (ISO)
- International Red Cross and Red Crescent Movement (ICRM)
- International Telecommunication Union (ITU)
- International Trade Union Confederation (ITUC)
- Inter-Parliamentary Union (IPU)
- Multilateral Investment Guarantee Agency (MIGA)
- Nonaligned Movement (NAM) (guest)
- North Atlantic Treaty Organization (NATO)
- Nuclear Energy Agency (NEA)
- Nuclear Suppliers Group (NSG)
- Organisation internationale de la Francophonie (OIF) (observer)
- Organisation for Economic Co-operation and Development (OECD)
- Organization for Security and Cooperation in Europe (OSCE)
- Organisation for the Prohibition of Chemical Weapons (OPCW)
- Organization of American States (OAS) (observer)
- Permanent Court of Arbitration (PCA)
- Schengen Convention
- Southeast European Cooperative Initiative (SECI) (observer)
- United Nations (UN)
- United Nations Conference on Trade and Development (UNCTAD)
- United Nations Educational, Scientific, and Cultural Organization (UNESCO)
- United Nations Industrial Development Organization (UNIDO)
- United Nations Peacekeeping Force in Cyprus (UNFICYP)
- United Nations Truce Supervision Organization (UNTSO)
- Universal Postal Union (UPU)
- Western European Union (WEU) (associate partner)
- World Confederation of Labour (WCL)
- World Customs Organization (WCO)
- World Federation of Trade Unions (WFTU)
- World Health Organization (WHO)
- World Intellectual Property Organization (WIPO)
- World Meteorological Organization (WMO)
- World Tourism Organization (UNWTO)
- World Trade Organization (WTO)
- Zangger Committee (ZC)

=== Law and order in Slovakia ===
Law of Slovakia

- Capital punishment in Slovakia
- Constitution of Slovakia
- Crime in Slovakia
- Human rights in Slovakia
  - LGBT rights in Slovakia
  - Freedom of religion in Slovakia
- Law enforcement in Slovakia
- Slovak mafia
- Prisons in Slovakia

=== Military of Slovakia ===
Military of Slovakia

- Command
  - Commander-in-chief:
    - Ministry of Defence of Slovakia
- Forces
  - Army of Slovakia
  - Navy of Slovakia
  - Air Force of Slovakia
  - Special forces of Slovakia
- Military ranks of Slovakia

=== Local government in Slovakia ===
Local government in Slovakia

== History of Slovakia ==
History of Slovakia

- Timeline of the history of Slovakia
- Current events of Slovakia
- Economic history of Slovakia
- Military history of Slovakia

== Culture of Slovakia ==
Culture of Slovakia

- Architecture of Slovakia
- Cuisine of Slovakia
- Festivals in Slovakia
- Languages of Slovakia
- Media in Slovakia
- Museums in Slovakia
- National symbols of Slovakia
  - Coat of arms of Slovakia
  - Slovak heraldry
  - Flag of Slovakia
  - National anthem of Slovakia
- People of Slovakia
- Prostitution in Slovakia
- Public holidays in Slovakia
- Records of Slovakia
- Religion in Slovakia
  - Buddhism in Slovakia
  - Christianity in Slovakia
  - Hinduism in Slovakia
  - Islam in Slovakia
  - Judaism in Slovakia
  - Sikhism in Slovakia
- World Heritage Sites in Slovakia

=== Art in Slovakia ===
- Art in Slovakia
- Cinema of Slovakia
- Literature of Slovakia
- Music of Slovakia
- Television in Slovakia
- Theatre in Slovakia

=== Sports in Slovakia ===
Sport in Slovakia

- Football in Slovakia
- Slovakia at the Olympics

== Economy and infrastructure of Slovakia ==
Economy of Slovakia

- Economic rank, by nominal GDP (2007): 56th (fifth-sixth)
- Agriculture in Slovakia
- Banking in Slovakia
  - National Bank of Slovakia
- Communications in Slovakia
  - Internet in Slovakia
- Companies of Slovakia
- Currency of Slovakia: Euro (see also: Euro topics)
  - ISO 4217: EUR
- Economic history of Slovakia
- Energy in Slovakia
  - Energy in Slovakia
  - Oil industry in Slovakia
- Health care in Slovakia
- Mining in Slovakia
- Slovakia Stock Exchange
- Tourism in Slovakia
- Transport in Slovakia
  - Airports in Slovakia
  - Rail transport in Slovakia
  - Roads in Slovakia
- Water supply and sanitation in Slovakia

== Education in Slovakia ==
Education in Slovakia

- List of universities and colleges in Slovakia

== See also ==
Slovakia

- Index of Slovakia-related articles
- List of international rankings
- List of Slovakia-related topics
- Member state of the European Union
- Member state of the North Atlantic Treaty Organization
- Member state of the United Nations
- Outline of Europe
- Outline of geography
