= Buddhism in Slovakia =

Buddhism is not officially recognized as a religion in Slovakia. As of January 2021, Buddhists numbered 6,722 or 0.12% of the population.

Various Buddhist schools, including all three traditional vehicles (Theravada, Mahayana and Vajrayana), are active as either informal groups or civil associations. Theravada is represented by groups of vipassana practitioners. Several Zen schools, including disciples of Sando Kaisen, and the Korean Kwan Um School, represent the Mahayana. Vajrayana schools include Nyingma practitioners following Namkai Norbu Rinpoche. The Diamond Way organisation founded and directed by Ole Nydahl is also active in Slovakia.

== History ==
After World War II, Czechoslovakia (later to be known as Slovakia) was reconstituted as a socialist state and religious freedoms were restricted. Article 32 of the 1960 Constitution of Czechoslovakia established the freedom of religion for individuals. Along with immigration and globalization, the number of Buddhists and influence of Buddhism in Slovakia slowly increased. However, the influence and spread of Buddhism remained obscure as adherents amounted to less than 1% of the population. Buddhism has been acknowledged in Slovakia, however, and leaders of Buddhist traditions have been welcomed. In 2016, president of Slovakia Andrej Kiska met with the Dalai Lama in Bratislava and described it as a “privilege” to meet with the Tibetan spiritual leader.

== Demographic ==
According to the 2021 census, the number of adherents to Buddhism numbered 6,722 or 0.12% of the population. Buddhism is not recognized as a state religion in Slovakia as it does not meet the requirement of at least 50,000 adherents, and is thereby registered as a civic association. In 2022, the Public Defender of Rights (ombudsperson) stated that the registration requirements were unreasonable, discriminatory, and unnecessary; the Ministry of Culture refused to initiate a legal change.

== See also ==
- Religion in Slovakia
- Buddhism in Europe
- Buddhism in the West
- Freedom of religion in Slovakia
