= Freedom of religion in Slovakia =

Freedom of religion in Slovakia refers to the extent to which people in Slovakia are freely able to practice their religious beliefs, taking into account both government policies and societal attitudes toward religious groups.

The laws of Slovakia guarantee the freedom of religious belief, and criminalize the defamation of and discrimination against religious groups. Religious groups may register with the government in order to receive certain privileges, but the threshold of membership required for new groups to register is prohibitively high. Government officials have explicitly stated that preventing Islamic organizations from registering is a reason for this requirement. Christian groups have also complained that this membership threshold stymies the ability for individuals in registered religious organizations to dissent against their religious leadership.

Politicians from far-right parties in the National Council, Slovakia's legislative body, frequently espouse Islamophobic and antisemitic rhetoric and conspiracy theories. Some of them have faced censure as a consequence of their violation of laws against the propagation of extremist materials and against affiliation with groups dedicated to the suppression of fundamental rights and freedoms.

According to NGOs and unregistered religious groups, negative attitudes toward unregistered religious groups are prevalent, and there are significant amounts of hate speech online against religious minorities and refugees.

In 2023, the country was scored 4 out of 4 for religious freedom.

== Demographics ==
According to the 2011 census, Roman Catholics constitute 62 percent of the population. Augsburg Lutherans 5.9 percent, and Greek Catholics 3.8 percent; 13.4 percent did not state a religious affiliation. Other religious groups present in small numbers include the Reformed Christian Church, other Protestant groups, Jehovah's Witnesses, Orthodox Christians, Jews, Baháʼís, and Muslims.

Greek Catholics are generally ethnic Slovaks and Ruthenians, although some Ruthenians belong to the Orthodox Church. Most Orthodox Christians live in the eastern part of the country. Members of the Reformed Christian Church live primarily in the south, near the border with Hungary, where many ethnic Hungarians live. Other religious groups tend to be spread evenly throughout the country.

== History ==
=== Early modern period ===
For much of the late medieval and early modern period, the territories corresponding to modern day Slovakia were controlled by the Austrian Empire. During this period, Hungarian aristocrats encouraged Jews from elsewhere in eastern and central Europe to immigrate into their territories. Parts of modern-day Slovakia were also controlled by the Ottoman Empire until the late 17th century, incorporate in the Budin Eyalet, Eğri Eyalet and Uyvar Eyalet. The populations of these regions were religiously diverse, including Muslims, Christians of various denominations, and Jews; non-Muslims were required to pay a special tax to the Ottoman government.

During the 18th century, Maria Theresa actively tried to suppress the Jewish and Protestant communities living in the Austrian Empire, at certain points going as far as ordering the expulsions of Jews en masse. Her son and successor, Emperor Joseph II of Austria, reversed these policies and passed the Patent of Toleration in 1781 followed by the Edict of Tolerance in 1782, with the former granting religious freedom to non-Catholic Christians, and the latter extending religious freedom to Jews, although it also limited the ability of Jews to publish literature in traditional Jewish languages such as Yiddish and Hebrew.

=== First Czechoslovak Republic ===
Following the dissolution of Austria-Hungary at the end of World War I, Slovakian territories were incorporated as part of Czechoslovakia. Early on, Czechoslovakia was one of the most favorable countries for Jews in Eastern Europe in the interwar period, with the government providing political support to Jews as an official national group within the country. However, this policy of ethnic and religious tolerance waned during the 1930s as antisemitism became increasingly popular in the country.

=== Slovak State ===
During World War II, Slovakia was governed by a Nazi client-state. This state broadly complied with the Nazi regime's genocidal policies, first imposing anti-Jewish laws analogous to the Nuremberg Laws, and later deporting Jews to German-run camps in Poland as part of the Holocaust. Around 105,000 Jews, 77% of the pre-war Jewish population, were consequently killed.

=== Czechoslovak Socialist Republic ===
After World War II, Czechoslovakia was reconstituted as a socialist state. During this period, religion was suppressed by the government, which promoted atheism. Article 32 of the 1960 Constitution of Czechoslovakia establishes the freedom of religion for individuals.

=== Independent Slovakia ===
Since the establishment of the Republic of Slovakia in 1993, the government has granted subsidies to religious groups on a yearly basis.

In 2017, politicians in government, including representatives of Direction – Social Democracy, the largest political party in the government and part of the ruling coalition, stated that their support for raising the number of religious members required for group registration was explicitly due to a concern that Islamic groups would otherwise be able to register in the country. In January 2017, then-Prime Minister Robert Fico stated that a “unified Muslim community” within the country's territory would be a “constant source of security risk,” and that this justified a refusal to accept migrants under the European Commission's refugee resettlement program. Members of opposition parties have also expressed strong opposition to Islam.

As of the 2016 Slovak parliamentary election, Kotleba – People's Party Our Slovakia (L'SNS), a Neo-Nazi party, won 14 seats in parliament (out of 150), making it the 5th largest party in parliament. Its representatives have engaged in Islamophobic and antisemitic rhetoric in parliamentary debates, among other things claiming that Islam condones pedophilia and necrophilia, and that "Zionist" politicians were involved in a conspiracy to bring Muslims into Slovakia. Individual representatives of L'SNS have been charged by the Slovak Police Force for propagating extremist rhetoric and the defamation of nations and beliefs. In 2017, a Supreme Court received a proposal made by the prosecutor general to dissolve L'SNS for being a threat to the country's democratic system, as well as for violation of the constitution and other laws. The case was dismissed in 2019, ruling that the prosecution had failed to provide sufficient evidence. A 2017 case filed against L'SNS MP Stanislav Mizik for incitement on Facebook was similarly dismissed in 2019. Later that year, however, Mizik's attorney and six other people were arrested for the possession of Nazi paraphernalia, and in October a L'SNS official was convicted for shouting a greeting associated with a Slovak fascist paramilitary at a Supreme Court hearing in 2018. L'SNS and other far-right sympathizers organized a variety of other actions commemorating the fascist First Slovak State over the course of 2019.

== Legal framework ==
The constitution guarantees the freedom of religious belief and affiliation. It further states the country is not bound to any particular faith and religious groups shall manage their affairs independently from the state, including in providing religious education and establishing clerical institutions. The constitution guarantees the right to practice one's faith privately or publicly, either alone or in association with others. It states the exercise of religious rights may be restricted only by measures "necessary in a democratic society for the protection of public order, health, and morals or for the protection of the rights and freedoms of others."

The law does not allow burial earlier than 48 hours following death, including for religious groups whose traditions mandate an earlier burial.

=== Anti-discrimination laws ===
The law prohibits establishing, supporting, and promoting groups dedicated to the suppression of fundamental rights and freedoms, including religious freedom, as well as "demonstrating sympathy" with such groups. These crimes are punishable by up to five years' imprisonment. The law further prohibits Holocaust denial, including questioning, endorsing, or excusing the Holocaust. Violators face sentences of up to three years in prison. The law also prohibits the denial of crimes committed by the prior fascist and communist regimes.

The law criminalizes issuance, possession, and dissemination of extremist materials, including those defending, supporting, or instigating hatred, violence, or unlawful discrimination against a group of persons on the basis of their religion. Such criminal activity is punishable by up to eight years' imprisonment.

The law prohibits the defamation of a person or group's belief as a criminal offense punishable by up to five years' imprisonment.

=== Religious group registration ===
The law requires religious groups to register with the Department of Church Affairs in the Ministry of Culture in order to employ spiritual leaders to perform officially recognized functions. Registration also confers the legal status necessary to perform economic functions such as opening a bank account or renting property, and civil functions such as presiding at burial ceremonies. Registered groups and churches receive annual state subsidies. Clergy from unregistered religious groups do not officially have the right to perform weddings or to minister to their members in prisons or government hospitals. Unregistered groups may not establish religious schools or receive government funding.

In order to register with the government, a religious group must have at least 50,000 adult members in the country, either citizens or permanent residents, and they must submit an "honest declaration" attesting to their membership, knowledge of the articles of faith and basic tenets of the religion, personal identity numbers and home addresses, and support for the group's registration to the Ministry of Culture. This was requirement increased from a previous requirement of 20,000 in 2017. Of the 18 registered churches and religious groups in Slovakia, five meet the 50,000 member requirement; the rest were registered before the requirement was established.

The law requires public broadcasters to allocate airtime for registered religious groups but not for unregistered groups.

The 18 registered churches and religious groups are:

- Apostolic Church (Pentecostal)
- Baháʼí Community
- Central Union of Jewish Religious Communities
- Christian Congregations (Kresťanské zbory)
- The Church of Jesus Christ of Latter-day Saints
- Church of the Brethren
- Czechoslovak Hussite Church
- Evangelical Church of the Augsburg Confession
- Evangelical Methodist Church
- Jehovah's Witnesses
- New Apostolic Church
- Old Catholic Church of Slovakia (Starokatolícka cirkev na Slovensku)
- Orthodox Church of the Czech Lands and Slovakia
- Reformed Christian Church
- Roman Catholic Church
- Seventh-day Adventist Church
- Slovak Greek Catholic Church
- Unity of the Brethren Baptists

A group without the 50,000 adult adherents required to obtain status as an official religious group may seek registration as a civic association, which provides the legal status necessary to carry out activities such as operating a bank account or entering into a contract. In doing so, however, the group may not call itself a church or identify itself officially as a religious group, since the law governing registration of citizen associations specifically excludes religious groups from obtaining this status. In order to register a civic association, three citizens are required to provide their names and addresses and the name, goal organizational structure, executive bodies, and budgetary rules of the group.

A concordat with the Holy See provides the legal framework for relations between the government and the domestic Catholic Church and the Holy See. Two corollaries cover the operation of Catholic religious schools, the teaching of Catholic religious education as a subject, and Catholic priests serving as military chaplains. An agreement between the government and 11 of the 17 other registered religious groups provides similar status to those groups. The unanimous approval of the existing parties to the agreement is required for other religious groups to obtain similar benefits.

== Government practices ==
The Department of Church Affairs of the Ministry of Culture oversees relations between religious groups and the state and manages the distribution of state subsidies to religious groups and associations. The ministry may not legally intervene in the internal affairs of religious groups or direct their activities.

The government allocates approximately 40 million euros ($40 million) per year in annual state subsidies to the 18 registered religious groups. The basis for each allocation was the number of clergy each group had, and a large portion of each group's subsidy continued to be used for payment of the group's clergy. The Ministry of Culture's cultural grant program allocates money for the upkeep of religious monuments.

=== Criticism ===
Members of registered Christian churches have argued that stringent registration requirements limit religious freedom by preventing dissent within churches. Dissenting members stymied in attempts to reform official theological positions might normally split off to form their own church, but the difficulty in registering a new religion prevents such an action.

Representatives of the Muslim community have reported that their lack of registration prevented them from formally employing an imam. Prisons and detention facilities prevent Muslim spiritual representatives from gaining access to their adherents. The lack of official registration has made obtaining the necessary construction permits for prayer rooms and religious sites more difficult, although there was no law prohibiting unregistered groups from obtaining such permits. Various members of parliament, including members of both ruling and opposition parties, have made anti-Muslim public comments.

Jewish community leaders have criticized the National Memory Institute, a state-chartered institution, for reportedly downplaying the role of prominent World War II-era figures in supporting antisemitic policies. Representatives of the Jewish community stated that members of the ruling Direction – Social Democracy party, as well as L'SNS, made antisemitic comments and promoted antisemitic conspiracy theories.

== Education ==
All public elementary school students must take a religion or an ethics class, depending on personal or parental preferences. Individual schools and teachers decide what material to teach in each religion class. Although the content of the courses in most schools is Catholicism, parents may ask a school to include teachings of different faiths. Private and religious schools define their own content for religion courses.

In both public and private schools, religion class curricula do not mention unregistered groups or some of the smaller registered groups, and unregistered groups may not teach their faiths at schools. Teachers from a registered religious group normally teach about the tenants of their own faith, although they may teach about other faiths as well. The government pays the salaries of religion teachers in public schools.

== Societal attitudes ==
NGOs and unregistered religious groups report that they have had difficulties altering negative public attitudes towards smaller, unregistered religious organizations, because of the social stigma associated with not having the same legal benefits accorded to registered religions.

NGOs report that there is significant online hate speech towards Muslims and refugees. Local NGOs have distributed anti-Muslim literature to churches in Slovakia. Representatives of the Muslim community have stated that they live in fear, and that they do not publicize the locations of the prayer rooms so as not to inflame public opinion. In 2018, a man committed a knife attack at a kebab shop in Banska Bystrica while shouting anti-Muslim slurs. He was convicted in 2019 and sentenced to 4 years in prison, reduced from an original charge of 21 years.

Some Christian groups and other organizations characterized in the press as far-right have issued statements praising the World War II-era fascist government responsible for the deportation of thousands of Jews to Nazi death camps, and they continued to organize gatherings where participants displayed symbols of the World War II-era fascist First Slovak Republic.

According to a 2019 study carried out by the European Commission, 13 percent of Slovakians believe that discrimination based on religion is widespread while 74 percent said that it was rare. 84 percent stated that they would be comfortable with having a head of state that belonged to a religion other than the country's majority religion. A survey conducted by the Public Affairs Institute found that nearly 60 percent of respondents would oppose a Muslim family moving into their neighborhood, and that 17 percent felt similarly about the prospect of a Jewish family moving in. Sociologists and representatives of the Jewish community have stated that they believe antisemitic statements to be on the rise as of 2019, citing increases in antisemitic vandalism as well as the increasing popularity of the L'SNS.

== See also ==
- Religion in Slovakia
