= International rankings of Slovakia =

These are the international rankings of Slovakia.

== International rankings ==
- Human Development Index 2018: Rank 38th out of 189 countries
- Index of Economic Freedom 2017: Rank 57th out of 180 countries
- Reporters Without Borders' Worldwide Press Freedom Index 2018: Rank 27th out of 180 countries
- Global Competitiveness Report 2018–2019: Rank 41st out of 140 countries
- Corruption Perceptions Index 2018: 57th out of 180 countries
- Democracy Index 2018: Rank 44th out of 167 countries
- Environmental Performance Index 2018: Rank 28th out of 180 countries
- Global Peace Index 2018: Rank 22nd out of 163 countries
- Programme for International Student Assessment 2015: Rank 38th out of 73 jurisdictions
- World Intellectual Property Organization: Global Innovation Index 2026 ranked 48 out of 139 countries.
