= The Church of Jesus Christ of Latter-day Saints in Slovakia =

- Area: Europe Central
- Members: 334 (2025)
- Districts: 1
- Branches: 4
- FamilySearch Centers: 1

The Church of Jesus Christ of Latter-day Saints in Slovakia has been active since the 1920s. It remains relatively unknown to Slovak society. Mormon religious structures in Slovakia include 4 branches and one group. The number of people associated with Mormonism in Slovakia reaches several hundred, of whom about 20-25% of total members are considered participating members. Slovakia holds a place in Mormon culture, including in the speeches and teachings of the leadership of this religious group.

== History ==
The presence of The Church of Jesus Christ of Latter-day Saints in the territory of modern Slovakia dates back to the 1920s. The church obtained legal recognition in Czechoslovakia in 1928. A year later, the church's general authorities dedicated Czechoslovakia for missionary work. The Czechoslovak Mission officially commenced on 24 July 1929. Initially, however, no activities were conducted in Slovak territories, with efforts focused entirely on Czech-speaking regions. The first person residing in today's Slovakia was baptized in 1939.

The annexation of Czechoslovakia by Nazi Germany in March 1939 did not immediately lead to drastic changes in the mission's operations. Wallace F. Toronto, who had served as president of the Czechoslovak Mission since 1936, believed that missionaries would not have to leave the country as "Hitler's occupation went so smoothly". Nonetheless, he introduced adjustments to the missionaries' daily work. He recommended stopping the distribution of tracts and pamphlets and limiting teaching to individuals already contacted. He also emphasized strengthening the faith of local church members and adhered to regulations imposed by the occupying authorities, including restrictions on assembly.

On 3 June 1939, the First Presidency ordered the mission's closure due to the worsening political situation. This decision initially surprised Toronto, who believed the situation in his assigned region remained stable. Ultimately, missionaries were evacuated on 24 August 1939. On 27 August 1939, Josef Roubíček, a 21-year-old local priesthood holder, was ordained as acting mission president. Toronto departed Czechoslovakia a few days later, on 31 August 1939.

After World War II, the mission resumed temporarily in 1946, but it was shut down again a few years later, in 1950. On 6 April 1950, the socialist Czechoslovak authorities revoked the church's legal recognition. Scholars have noted the irony of this date, as April 6 holds special significance in Mormon theology and history.

Toronto remained president of the Czechoslovak Mission until his death in 1968. He maintained contact with members through discreet correspondence. In 1964, at the direction of Church President David O. McKay, he visited Czechoslovakia using a tourist visa. He returned a year later to meet with Czechoslovak officials and seek the church's legal reinstatement. His efforts were unsuccessful; Toronto was initially arrested and later deported.

The first Slovaks interested in Mormonism appeared in Czechoslovakia before the collapse of the socialist bloc. Otakar Vojkůvka and his family organized Christian yoga classes, which they used for unofficial missionary activities. Vojkůvka, baptized in July 1939, served as branch president in Brno during World War II. He played a significant role in the lives of Czechoslovak saints, particularly in reviving the church's religious activity in the 1980s. In 1980, Czechoslovakia was visited by Elder Boyd K. Packer, marking the first apostolic visit in several decades.

Due to political changes, the Czechoslovak Mission of the church was able to resume its activities on 1 July 1990. The community regained legal recognition in Czechoslovakia at that time. Also in 1990, Elder Russell M. Nelson, then serving in the Quorum of the Twelve, visited Czechoslovakia. Missionaries began their work in Slovak territories in 1991. The first branch was established in Trenčín in western Slovakia on 24 January 1993.

After the dissolution of Czechoslovakia, the government in Bratislava did not uphold the previous Czechoslovak decision to grant the church the status of a registered religious association. It was not until several years later that this status was finally obtained. In July 1999, Slovak President Rudolf Schuster visited the church's open house event and received a copy of the Book of Mormon as a gift. On 12 May 2006, Elder Dieter F. Uchtdorf, a member of the Quorum of the Twelve, dedicated Slovakia for missionary work.

The church's legal status within independent Slovakia was officially regulated on 18 October 2006. This was preceded by a month-long, nationwide petition drive to collect the required 20,000 signatures, as mandated by Slovak law. The petition campaign sparked protests from some Catholic groups in Slovakia. Slovak bishops urged their followers not to sign the petition, claiming that Mormon doctrine was incompatible with Catholicism and that signing the petition would be tantamount to betraying Catholicism. In Trnava, police threatened missionaries collecting signatures with fines and eventually forced them to leave the city. In Žilina, nuns organized protests urging residents not to sign the Mormon petition. The success of the petition drive became known in Mormon folklore as the "Slovak miracle".

Following the church's legal recognition, Elder David A. Bednar, a member of the Quorum of the Twelve, visited Slovakia. With registration as a legally recognized religious group, the church became one of the 18 groups in Slovakia with such status. The church's registration was also discussed in later press materials addressing the difficulties other religious groups in Slovakia faced in securing legal recognition.

The translation of the Book of Mormon into Slovak was published in 2013. In 2019, the First Presidency announced the release of the complete set of non-biblical Mormon scriptures, including the Pearl of Great Price, Doctrine and Covenants, and a new edition of the Book of Mormon in Slovak. During the refugee crisis caused by the Russian invasion of Ukraine, Slovak Latter-day Saints assisted Ukrainian refugees, helping a total of 13 people, both adults and children. The church also sent humanitarian aid, including water, food, and medicine, to refugees in Slovakia.

== Organizational structure and membership ==
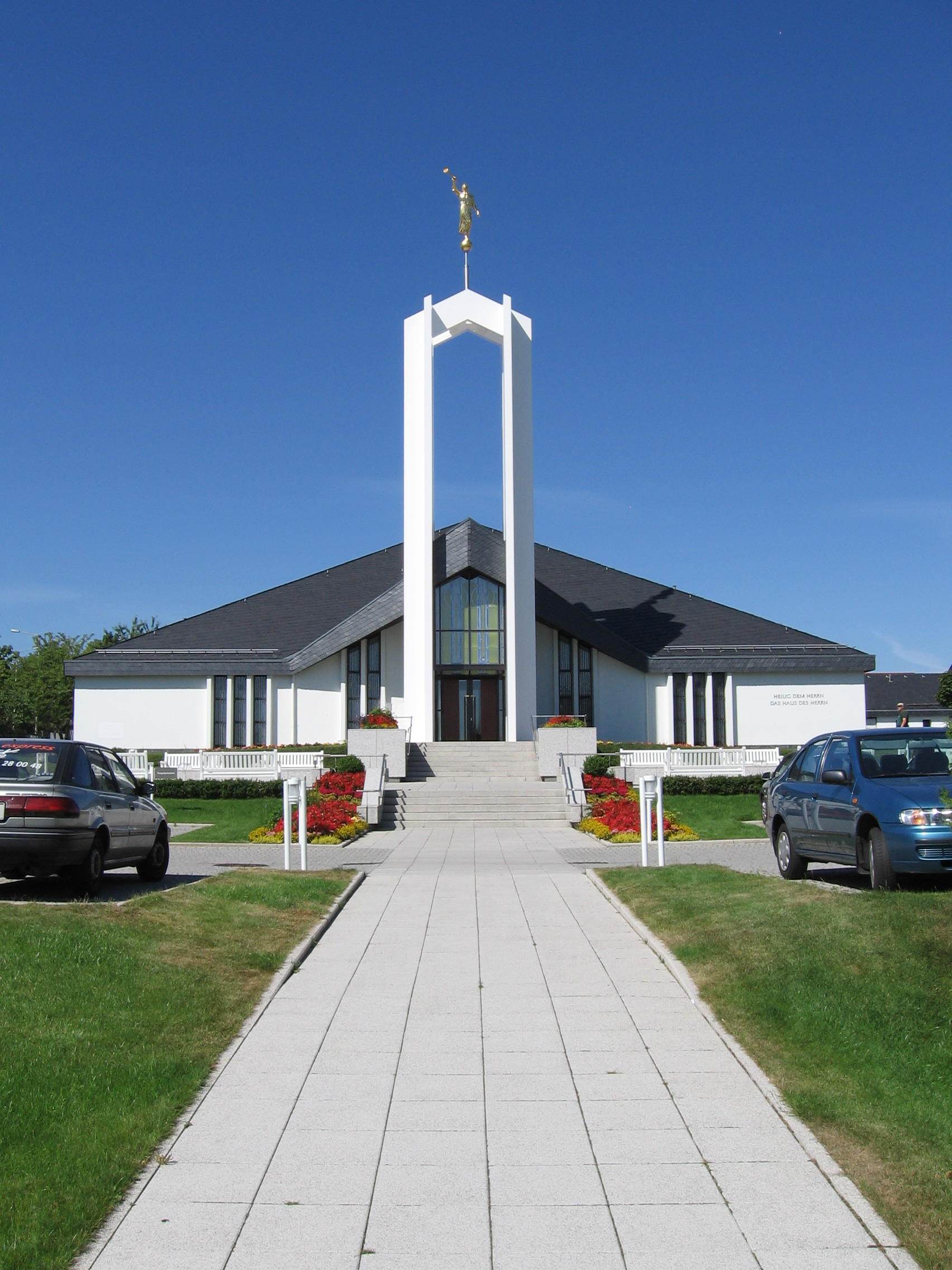
Mormon temple in Freiberg serves as the temple district for Latter-day Saints residing in Slovakia

At the time of Czechoslovakia's dissolution, Slovakia was home to between 20 and 30 Latter-day Saints. By the end of 1998, church statistics indicated approximately 100 members organized into three branches. The numbers grew gradually, with 102 members recorded in 2000, 120 in 2004, 124 in 2007, 139 in 2010, 203 in 2011, and 272 in 2017. However, these figures do not reflect the actual size of the Slovak Latter-day Saint community. The church only publishes the number of members listed in its records but does not disclose data on weekly sacrament meeting attendance, individual activity levels, or adherence to the church's standards. As a result, the actual number of actively engaged Slovak Latter-day Saints is significantly lower. Estimates suggest this may be between 20 and 25% of the official figures, equating to roughly 60 active members. Additionally, sources mention Slovak members affiliated with the Mormon Transhumanist Association, an organization combining Latter-day Saint beliefs with transhumanist principles.

In 2018, the church in Slovakia consisted of four branches and one group. In 2015, a separate district for Slovakia was established, headquartered in Bratislava. Before this, three Slovak branches were part of the Czech district based in Brno, while one reported directly to the mission. Slovakia does not have its own mission and is included within the jurisdiction of the Czech-Slovak Mission headquartered in Prague. This structure results in significantly less attention from mission leadership compared to the Czech Republic.

Until the mid-2000s, nearly all missionary work in Slovakia occurred in border areas adjacent to the Czech Republic. Approximately half of Slovak converts remain active a year after baptism, with even fewer maintaining their activity after several years in the church. A lack of opportunities for socializing with fellow Latter-day Saints has been cited as a contributing factor to this trend. It has also been observed that members of the Hungarian minority in Slovakia are more receptive to the church's message than ethnic Slovaks.

Only a few Slovak members have served as missionaries, which is traditionally considered a cornerstone of Mormon culture. Priesthood leaders are often foreigners, with non-native missionaries frequently being ordained to leadership positions due to the lack of local active priesthood holders. All Slovak branches and groups meet in rented or renovated buildings. Slovakia is part of the temple district associated with the Freiberg temple.

== Slovakia in Mormon culture ==
Despite the relatively small number of Latter-day Saints residing in Slovakia, the country has found a place in broader Mormon culture. Elder David A. Bednar, in a 2011 interview with Religious Educator, recounted his visit to Slovakia. He described meeting a Slovak member who had been baptized shortly before missionaries were evacuated from Czechoslovakia in the 1930s. He highlighted her determination to be baptized and mentioned her home adorned with images of significant church landmarks. He emphasized how "the light of the Gospel shone on her face".

During a January 2022 meeting with members under the jurisdiction of the Europe Area, Susan Bednar revisited the church's registration as a recognized religious entity in Slovakia. She connected this milestone to her husband's Slovak roots and the genealogical research he had conducted in Slovakia. She shared how both she and her husband felt a profound responsibility to engage in temple work on behalf of over 160 deceased Slovak ancestors of her husband. Susan Bednar also noted that the region of Slovakia where the petition for the church's legal recognition had garnered the most support was the same region from which her husband's ancestors originated. In this context, typical of Mormon thought, the petition effort was seen as a collaborative endeavor occurring on both sides of the veil, a direct reference to Mormon beliefs regarding the afterlife.

== Church in Slovak culture ==
In 1993, Czech television aired a documentary about Mormonism, which was also broadcast in Slovakia. Despite this exposure, Latter-day Saints remain largely unknown to Slovak society.

During Slovakia's 2011 census, the church was included for the first time as one of the options for religious affiliation on the census form, listed under its full and correct name.

The 2011 census reported 972 members of the church living in Slovakia – a figure significantly higher than that indicated by church statistics. This discrepancy was interpreted as an obvious error, likely resulting from some respondents providing random answers. These individuals may have been unsure about their religious affiliation and selected the church because its name seemed familiar.

== Bibliography ==
- Mehr, Kahlile B. (1992). "Enduring Believers: Czechoslovakia and the LDS Church, 1884-1990". Journal of Mormon History. 18 (2).
- Boone, David (July 2001). "The Evacuation of the Czechoslovak and German Missions at the Outbreak of World War II". BYU Studies. 40 (3).
