= Telecommunications in Slovakia =

Telecommunications in Slovakia includes fixed and mobile telephones, radio, television, and the Internet.

== Telephone ==
=== Fixed lines ===
Slovak Telecom Inc. (former Slovenské Telekomunikácie, a.s.) was privatised on 18 July 2000. The 51% package of shares was purchased by the German Deutsche Telecom AG for 1 bln. EUR (more than 44 bln. SKK at that time). The outstanding 49% of the shares are still owned by the Slovak government through the Department of Transport, Construction and Regional Development of the Slovak Republic (34%) and the National Property Fund (15%). Slovak Telecom was rebranded to T-Com in the year 2003. In 2010 there were more than 100 companies licensed to provide public fixed line telephone service, although many of these do not offer commercial service to the wider public. The most notable country-wide providers are T-Com, Orange, Dial Telecom, SWAN and UPC. Several regional providers also operate in the market. Many of these offer triple-play services consisting of a fixed line service, broadband internet access and access to television programmes. The number of triple-play customers has doubled since the service was introduced and currently peaks at 78,049 subscribers. (Note: Figure is as of 30 June 2010, as opposed to 41,734 subscribers by 20 June 2008.)

Due to strong penetration of the Slovak market by mobile phones, the fixed lines sector has decreased dramatically in recent years. While there were 1,655,380 fixed lines in use in 1999, their number decreased by 60% to 994,421 in 2010.

Key figures of the fixed lines sector

- Fixed lines: 1.1 million lines, 75th in the world (2011).
- Density: 18.31 lines per 100 inhabitants (2010).
- Lines connected to digital exchanges: 100% (2010).
- Households with fixed lines: 39.0% (2010).

=== Mobile cellular ===
Mobile communication in Slovakia first became available in the early 1990s when the first NMT network operator, EuroTel Bratislava, a.s., a subsidiary of the then state owned Slovenské Telekomunikácie a.s. EuroTel, introduced the first GSM service to public in 1997. EuroTel was privatised together with its parent company and was rebranded as T-Mobile on 3 May 2005. It is now fully integrated as part of the international T-Mobile brand. The second GSM network operator started its operation on 15 January 1997 under the name GlobTel a.s. It was acquired by France Télécom (through Atlas Services Belgium, 100% shares) and rebranded to Orange Slovensko on 27 March 2002. Telefónica Europe, the third mobile operator in Slovakia, entered the market in February 2007 under the O2 brand.

Virtual providers are active in the Slovak market, the most notable being Tesco Mobile (associated with Tesco Stores) and FunFón (a virtual operator associated with a popular FM radio station).

Key figures of the mobile cellular sector

- Active mobile cellular: 6.0 million subscribers, 99th in the world (2011). (Note: Active mobile subscribers includes industrial applications such as Alarm systems that use a SIM card for GSM based communication.)
- Density: 105.12 subscriptions per 100 inhabitants (2010).
- Land coverage of land (GSM): 95.9% of the land area (2010).
- Population coverage (GSM): 99.6% of the population (2010).

=== Telephone system ===
- International country code: +421, three international exchanges, one in Bratislava and two in Banská Bystrica.
- Emergency call numbers:
  - 112 - EU standard integrated emergency service (one nationwide call centre directly connected to police, EMS, firefighters, Mountain Rescue Service and others)
  - 158 - direct call centre - Police
  - 155 - direct call centre - EMS (features doctors available for consultations online)
  - 150 - direct call centre - Firefighters
  - 18300 - direct call centre - Mountain Rescue Service

== Radio ==
- Radio and Television of Slovakia (RTVS), the state-owned public broadcaster, operates multiple national and regional radio networks (2008).
- Privately owned radio stations: more than 20 (2008).
- Radios: 3.12 million (1997).
- List of most-listened-to radio stations as of June 2012:
  - Rádio Expres - 19.5% listened-to yesterday
  - Rádio Slovensko - 17.0% listened-to yesterday
  - Fun Rádio - 12.3% listened-to yesterday
  - Jemné Melódie - 8.2% listened-to yesterday
  - Rádio Europa 2 - 7.7% listened-to yesterday
  - Rádio Regina - 6.3% listened-to yesterday
  - Rádio Viva - 5.4% listened-to yesterday

== Television ==
- Radio and Television of Slovakia (RTVS), the state-owned public broadcaster, operates 3 national TV stations (2008).
- Privately owned TV stations: 35 operating nationally, regionally, and locally (2008).
- Cable or satellite TV: ~ 40% of households are connected to multi-channel cable or satellite TV (2008).
- Televisions: 2.62 million (1997).

== Internet ==
Slovakia has one of the highest Internet penetration rates in the world and the highest penetration rate in Central and Eastern Europe. Slovakia has a large number of full-area ISP's that offer wired broadband Internet connections, including Slovak Telekom, Orange Slovensko and UPC. They offer a range of connections, from ADSL / ADSL2+ to fiber optic. ADSL or ADSL2+, VDSL is available in almost every town and village in Slovakia.

Key figures of the Internet sector

- Internet country code (TLD): .sk
- Internet users: ~ 80% of the population, ~ 4.4 million (2012).
- Internet hosts: 1.4 million, 41st in the world (2012).

=== Internet censorship and surveillance ===
There are no government restrictions on access to the Internet or reports that the government monitors e-mail or Internet chat rooms without judicial oversight; however, police monitor Web sites containing hate speech and attempt to arrest or fine the authors.

The constitution and the law provide for freedom of speech and press. While the government mostly respects these rights in practice, in some instances, it limits these rights to impede criticism and limit actions of groups it considers extremist. The law prohibits the defamation of nationalities, punishable by up to three years in prison, and denial of the Holocaust, which carries a sentence of six months to three years in prison. Criminal penalties for defamation are rarely used. The constitution and the law prohibit arbitrary interference with privacy, family, home, or correspondence and the government generally respects these prohibitions in practice. Police must present a warrant before conducting a search or within 24 hours afterwards.

A new draft law under consideration in 2011 would allow the nation's tax office to block web servers that provide online gambling without a Slovak license. Opponents argue that the economic interests served by the law are not sufficient to justify online censorship.

== See also ==
- Telephone numbers in Slovakia
- Piano Media, a subscription-based payment system enabling paid content and services on Slovak media websites.
