= Denník N =

Slovak daily newspaper

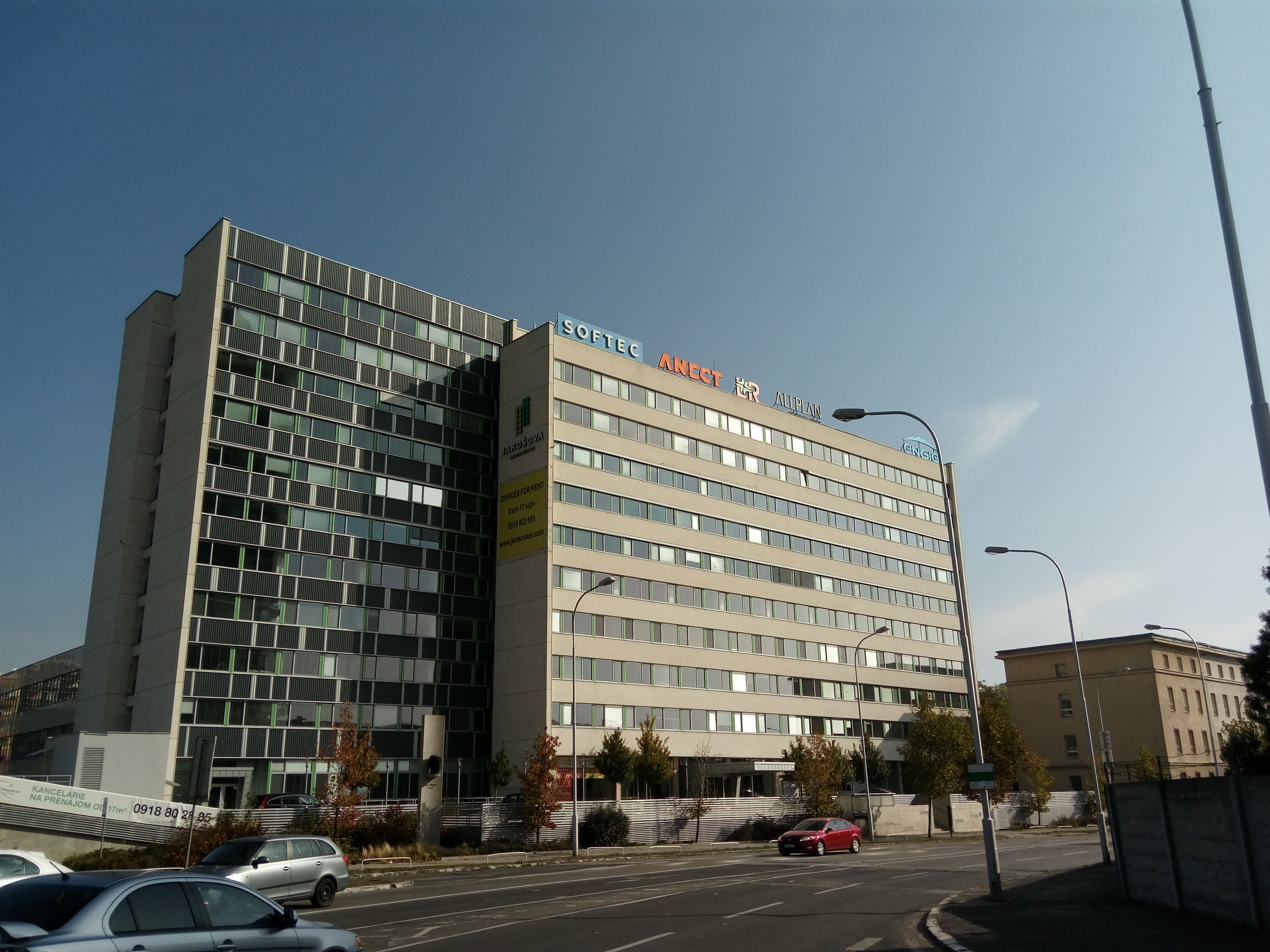
- Type: Daily newspaper
- Publisher: N Press
- Editor-in-chief: Matúš Kostolný
- Deputy editor: Vitalia Bella Juraj Javorský Marek Chorvatovič
- Founded: 1 January 2015
- Political alignment: Centrism, Liberalism
- Language: Slovak
- Headquarters: Jarošova 1, 831 03 Bratislava
- ISSN: 1339-844X (print); 2729-9198 (web)
- Website: dennikn.sk

Denník N is an independent Slovak daily newspaper and digital news outlet founded in 2015 in Bratislava. It is regarded as one of the most influential independent media organizations in Slovakia, with a business model built primarily on reader subscriptions.

== History ==
The paper was established in January 2015 by a group of journalists who left the daily SME after a major stake in its publisher was acquired by an investment group with links to the financial conglomerate Penta.

In 2014, the Namav, a subject subvented by the Penta Investments group, announced the purchase of Petit Press, the publisher of the newspaper. In reaction, a major part of the editorial board, including the editor-in-chief, announced their resignation. "We are leaving SME and we will try to create a new medium that no one will suspect that it serves someone other than the readers", stated Matúš Kostolný, the departing editor-in-chief.

The founders positioned Denník N as a newsroom independent of oligarchic and political influence, focusing on investigative and explanatory journalism. In subsequent years, subscription growth accelerated; by 2024, Denník N reported more than 70,000 paying readers. A bold marketing campaign in 2025 added 10,000 new subscribers within four days.

== Operations ==
Denník N publishes a daily print edition on weekdays, alongside a 24/7 digital platform with articles, newsletters, podcasts, and video.

As of late 2025, the newsroom employed around 130 staff members, including 110 journalists, and the publication had over 80,000 paid subscribers.

The company runs a book-publishing division, which has released over 150 titles, including works by Slovak and international authors. The organization has also developed the Readers Engagement and Monetization Platform (REMP), an open-source suite of tools designed to support digital subscription and donation models. REMP is used by publishers across Europe, Africa, and Asia.

== Expansion and sister outlets ==
In 2018, Denník N, co-founded Deník N, an independent daily in the Czech Republic, in cooperation with local investors. In 2021, it acquired Hiking.sk, a Slovak online platform dedicated to hiking and outdoor activities. In 2022, it launched Napunk, a Hungarian-language news portal serving Slovakia’s Hungarian minority. Since 2023, the company has been a minority shareholder in the Czech weekly Respekt, the feminist magazine Heroine, and the IT company FatChilli. In 2026 it took over the European online platform EUobserver expanding into the English language and EU affairs market.

== Ownership ==
Denník N is published by N Press, s.r.o., which is fully owned by Denník N, a.s., a joint-stock company with more than 80 shareholders. The majority are journalists and staff of Denník N.

== Recognition ==
The paper has been consistently ranked among the most awarded Slovak media organizations at the annual Journalism Award competition. International observers have highlighted Denník N as a case study in sustainable subscription-driven journalism in Central and Eastern Europe.

Denník N published Threema chat logs of the Slovak businessman Marián Kočner in March 2019, which prove that he was able to pursue his far-reaching criminal business for years with the toleration or active assistance of many Slovak politicians, prosecutors, and judges. Kočner is determined as the alleged commissioner of the murder of the investigative journalists Ján Kuciak and Martina Kušnírová. The murder triggered the 2018 crisis in Slovakia.
