= Dobroslav Trnka =

Slovak lawyer (1963–2023)

- Born: 9 November 1963; Skalica, Czechoslovakia
- Died: 25 October 2023 (aged 59)
- Occupation: Lawyer
- Known for: General prosecutor of Slovakia (2004-2011)

Dobroslav Trnka (9 November 1963 – 25 October 2023) was a Slovak lawyer who served as the prosecutor general of Slovakia from 2004 to 2011. On 25 February 2021, he was banned from entering the United States by the U.S Secretary of State Antony Blinken due to his involvement in significant corruption.

== Early life ==
Dobroslav Trnka was born on 9 November 1963 in Skalica. He studied law at the Comenius University, graduating in 1987. From 1988 to 2004 he served as a military prosecutor, eventually reaching the rank of colonel.

As a military prosecutor he kept a rather low profile among the general public. Nonetheless, he played a role in prosecuting members of the Communist regime apparatus for harsh crackdown against pro-democratic protesters during the Velvet Revolution. This set Trnka apart from other members of the military, who were seen as trying to shelter their former comrades from facing punishment for their actions prior to the transition to democracy. As a result of his actions, Trnka was seen positively by some members of the former anti-communist dissent, notably František Mikloško.

In addition to leading prosecution of the former communist officials, Trnka launched investigations against personnel of the secret service agency SlS accused by the political opposition of destroying evidence possibly implicating members of its communist-era predecessor StB.

== Prosecutor general ==
In 2004, Dobroslav Trnka was nominated for the office of the prosecutor general. Originally, his nomination was proposed by the MP Ivan Šimko. Subsequently Trnka managed to obtain support of a heterogenous group of political parties, including Christian Democratic Movement, Party of the Hungarian Coalition, Direction – Social Democracy, a part of the Alliance of the New Citizen and even the Communist Party of Slovakia. This uneasy alliance allowed Trnka to triumph over his opponent Ján Bernát backed by an equally heterogenous alliance of People's Party – Movement for a Democratic Slovakia and Slovak Democratic and Christian Union – Democratic Party.

As a prosecutor general, he was associated with an informal, frank approach to communication and wearing casual clothing in the office, that had been previously dominated by lawyers in suits using the professional jargon.

In the office Trnka faced increased criticism from opposition politicians for allegedly protecting politicians and businessmen close to the ruling party Direction – Social Democracy. For that reason, his surprise nomination for a new term in 2010 by the Slovak Democratic and Christian Union – Democratic Party's MP Stanislav Janiš caused a political crisis. Eventually, Trnka lost his bid by one vote and the parliament elected Jozef Čentéš as the new prosecutor general.

== Criminal accusations ==
On 16 January 2020, Trnka was arrested by the police and accused of abusing his powers as a general prosecutor. The key proof was a recording found in the possession of the arrested businessman Marián Kočner, who had installed a hidden camera in Trnka's office. The recordings showed Trnka discussing Kočner's efforts to bribe MPs to secure the second term as a prosecutor general for Trnka. The recordings also show that Trnka had in his possession key evidence for the Gorilla scandal, which he used to blackmail the businessman Jaroslav Hasčák.

On 25 February 2021, Trnka was publicly designated by the U.S Secretary of State Antony Blinken due to being "involved in corrupt acts that undermined rule of law and the Slovak public’s faith in their government’s democratic institutions, officials, and public processes." Along with his son Jakub, Trnka was declared ineligible for the entry to the United States.

Trnka faced criminal prosecution and disciplinary charges for the remainder of his life but was not sentenced for any crime.

== Death ==
Trnka died of cancer on 25 October 2023, at the age of 59.
