= Gorilla scandal =

Political corruption scandal in Slovakia

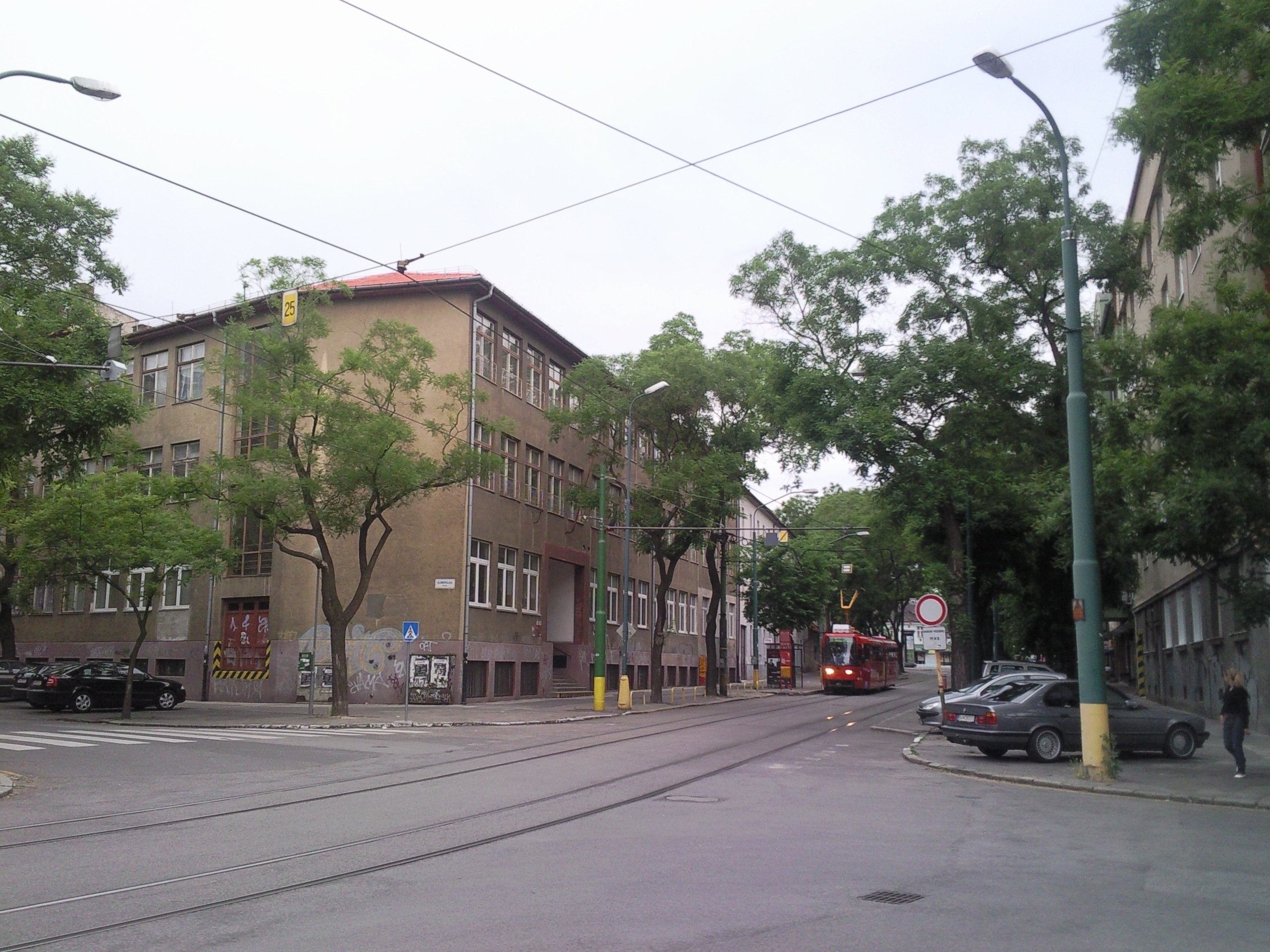
Vazovova Street in Bratislava, the wiretapped flat is located in the house to the right

Gorilla scandal (Slovak: Kauza Gorila) is a major political corruption scandal in Slovakia. It is named after a Slovak Secret Service wiretap file (Slovak: Gorila) from the years 2005-2006 which leaked to the internet in December 2011. The file suggests information about politicians, officials and business executives discussing kickbacks in return for procurement and privatization contracts. The file presents alleged massive corruption at the highest level and its leak to the public rocked the Slovak political scene. On October 16, 2019, several Slovak mainstream medias received a link to download a file that appear to be a copy of original wiretapping operation Gorilla.

The Gorilla scandal resulted in a wave of nationwide political protests across the country, that organized themselves into a coordinated effort called Protest Gorila. The scandal also influenced the results of the 2012 Slovak parliamentary election. Although the full contents of the file have not yet been confirmed, Interior Minister Daniel Lipšic has confirmed the intelligence agency did carry out a wiretapping operation named Gorilla. On 12 January 2012 the Regional Court in Bratislava confirmed it allowed the Gorilla wiretaps. However, the accuracy of the content has not been officially confirmed.

== Background ==
In 2005, the head of the analytical department of the Slovak Intelligence Service (SIS) Peter Mravec noticed, that government limousines and cars of the Penta Group, one of the two biggest investment companies in the country, often park in the vicinity of his house on Vazovova Street in Bratislava, where he lived with his wife and two children at that time. In November 2005, the SIS filed a demand to wiretap the flat next to Mravec's. This flat belonged to businessman and former ex-police officer Zoltán Varga. Due to Varga's size and appearance, the wiretap was code named gorilla (Slovak: Gorila).

== Description ==
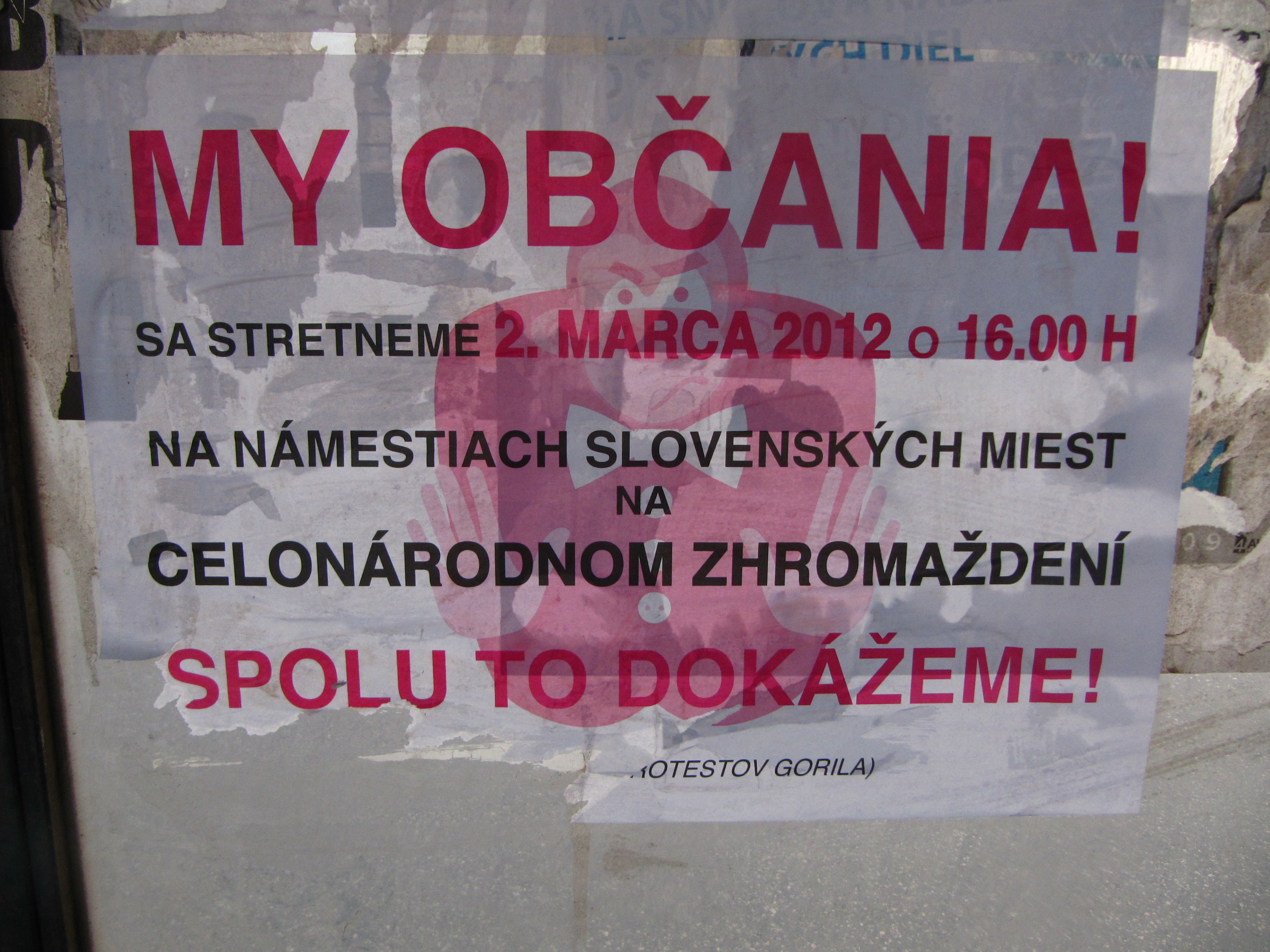
One of the posters used by the citizens in organizing the protests in the aftermath of the Gorilla scandal

The leaked text contains operational transcripts in the form of a report made by analyst Peter Mravec from two wiretaps: Gorila and Gorila1. Both wiretaps record conversations held from 2005 to 2006 in some parts of one flat located at Vazovova Street No. 9/A in Bratislava, Slovakia. Recorded are conversations of the flat's owner Zoltán Varga with the Head of the Special Affairs Department of the Office for Combating Corruption of the Presidium of the Police Force of Slovakia (Slovak: vedúci Oddelenia zvláštnych činnosti Úradu boja proti korupcii PPZ SR) Ján Rejda and businessman Peter Demovič and conversations of the flat's co-user Jaroslav Haščák, partner of the Penta Group with Deputy Prime Minister of Slovakia Jirko Malchárek, member of the Executive Board of the National Property Fund (Slovak: člen Výkonného výboru FNM SR) and Director of the Section of the National Property Fund for Establishing companies and Executing shareholder rights (Slovak: riaditeľka sekcie zakladateľských činností a výkonu práv akcionára FNM SR) Anna Bubeníková (SDKÚ), leader of the Direction – Social Democracy political party Robert Fico and his personal assistant František Határ.

The text is written in the third person in a descriptive manner, using direct quotations from the wiretaps only occasionally. It also contains some explanatory notes worked into the text by Mravec, filling in some of the missing context.

== Aftermath ==
The Gorilla file was leaked to the internet by an unknown source on 21 December 2011, according to TA3 TV, it was leaked a few hours before noon. The same day, spokesperson of the Penta Group Martin Danko declared the Gorila file to be "fiction" and "all made up".

The first popular political protest took place at the SNP Square in Bratislava on 27 January 2012. Several thousand people marched in front of the Presidential Palace, throwing bananas.

In 2018, following the murder of Ján Kuciak, police officers who raided the villa of the prime suspect in the murder, Marián Kočner, a prominent oligarch, found in his security safe USB keys with copies of audio records from Gorilla file that were thought to be lost. After the confirmation of audio copies, general prosecutor Jaromír Čižnár admitted that he heard bits from the audio recording when former general prosecutor Dobroslav Trnka played it to him and former Prime Minister Robert Fico. Dobroslav Trnka is a well-known friend of Kočner and, according to leaks from the police, Kočner used to instruct him on what to do when he was General prosecutor. Čižnár claimed that at the time he was unaware that the audiotape he heard was a copy from the Gorilla file and asked Trnka not to involve him in the affair.

== See also ==
- Slovak politics
- Slovak political scandals
- Penta (investment group)
- Crime in Slovakia
