= Dr. Max Group =

Pharmacy chain in Europe

- Company type: Private
- Industry: Pharmacy, Healthcare
- Founded: 2009
- Headquarters: Na Florenci 2116/15, Nové Město (Prague 1), Prague, Czech Republic
- Key people: Leonardo Ferrandino (CEO)
- Revenue: 22,566,209,000 Czech koruna (2021)
- Operating income: 1,024,255,000 Czech koruna (2021)
- Net income: 578,841,000 Czech koruna (2021)
- Total assets: 15,482,739,000 Czech koruna (2021)
- Owner: Penta Investments
- Number of employees: 20 000+ (2025)
- Website: www.drmax.eu

The Dr. Max Group is a European pharmacy and healthcare holding headquartered in Prague, Czech Republic. It is owned by the investment group Penta Investments and operates in the pharmaceutical, retail, wholesale, and manufacturing sectors. The Group is led by Leonardo Ferrandino, who has served as Group CEO and President since 2016.

While the Dr. Max pharmacy chain itself had been operating since 2009, the Dr. Max Group as a consolidated holding structure was created only later, in 2012, to integrate and oversee the network. With approximately 529 branches, it is the largest pharmacy chain in the Czech Republic. Penta Investments stated in 2024 public annual report that Dr. Max Group operated 3,030 pharmacies in 2024, making it Europe's second-largest pharmacy chain by number of locations.

== History ==
It was founded in January 2009 and has branches in a total of 17 different European countries, mainly in Slovakia, Czech Republic, Poland, Romania, Serbia, and Italy.

Dr. Max was established officially in 2004 by Penta Investments, following the acquisition of Česká lékárna holding. The company expanded to Slovakia and Poland in 2005, reaching 100 pharmacies by 2008.

In 2011, it launched Dr. Max Pharma, a private label manufacturer. The brand began with nutritional supplements and expanded to over-the-counter products.

Dr. Max acquired Lloyds Pharmacies and GEHE Pharma in 2012. This led to the creation of ViaPharma, a pharmaceutical distributor based in the Czech Republic.

The company opened online pharmacy retail in 2014 with the launch of its e-commerce platform.

== Services ==
In 2025, the company opened a standalone store under the brand name BJUT, which is intended for the premium cosmetics segment.

Dr. Max launched a marketplace platform in Czech Republic in 2025.

Czech branch introduced a robotic warehouse that makes dispensing medicines more efficient in Roudnice nad Labem. The source states that this technology has reduced warehouse operating costs by up to half and that the warehouse is one of the most modern in Europe.
