= Jaroslav Haščák =

Slovak businessman

Jaroslav Haščák (born 30 August 1969) is a Slovak entrepreneur. He is the co-founder of Penta Investments, a large private equity group active in Central Europe. He is considered one of the wealthiest people in Slovakia: Forbes estimates his family's net worth at around $2.1 billion at the end of 2025. In addition to his significant entrepreneurial successes, Haščák's career has also been marked by controversy, particularly surrounding the so-called Gorilla scandal, which triggered a legal battle that lasted for years.

== Early life ==
Haščák was born on 30 August 1969 in Ďurková in socialist Czechoslovakia. After graduating from high school, he studied international relations in Moscow and China. He completed his studies at the Moscow State Institute of International Relations (MGIMO), graduating in 1993. He also studied at Peking University in China. In the early 1990s, he and fellow student Marek Dospiva were already involved in import and export business: during their stay in Beijing, they began importing Chinese textiles to Czechoslovakia. After their return, Haščák, Dospiva, and other fellow students founded the financial company “Penta Brokers” in 1993/94, which later became the Penta Investments Group. The name “Penta” (Greek for five) stands for the five founding partners, who had all studied together in Moscow and what was then Czechoslovakia.

== Career ==
Haščák had been one of the three managing partners and key decision-makers at Penta Investments since its founding in the 1990s. The company succeeded in growing through the acquisition of former state-owned companies and relocated the headquarters of the holding company to Cyprus in 1999. Until the end of 2020, he served as managing partner of the group, responsible for strategy and key business areas. Under his leadership, Penta expanded significantly, particularly in the healthcare and finance sectors. He led the company into the healthcare sector (including hospital and pharmacy chains) and initiated a strategic realignment from private equity to long-term equity investments between 2010 and 2012, including the provision of venture capital for innovative technology company. Penta's portfolio includes well-known companies such as the drugstore chain Dr. Max, the insurance company Dôvera, and the betting company Fortuna.

At the end of 2020, Haščák stepped down from his operational roles due to the investigations into the "Gorilla" case, but remained a co-owner. After the allegations were cleared up, he returned to Penta's management in the fall of 2024 and once again took up a seat on the group's investment committee and board of directors.

== Politics ==
Through his business activities, Haščák was in frequent contact with top politicians in Slovakia and was considered an extremely influential figure. In 2011, he came to public attention when secret wiretap transcripts from the Slovak intelligence service SIS ("Gorilla" files) were leaked to the public, documenting meetings between Haščák and government officials in the 2000s. According to the wiretapped conversations, Haščák met with, among others, the then Minister of Economy Jirko Malchárek and the Chairwoman of the National Property Fund Anna Bubeníková to discuss corrupt privatization deals. In a conversation with Malchárek in 2006, Haščák said: "Democracy is a shitty system. Voters know nothing, voters are shit." A conversation with the opposition leader Robert Fico also appeared in the records. However, Haščák denied any corrupt dealings and claimed that the recordings had been taken out of context.

These revelations gave the impression that Penta had close ties to high-ranking politicians, or that they were effectively acting as its “puppets. The media therefore often refer to Haščák as a Slovak oligarch. In addition, his group of business partners has been criticized for holding extensive interests in the healthcare sector (hospitals, Dôvera insurance, Dr. Max pharmacies), which has been criticized as monopolization.

== Controversy ==
Haščák has been at the center of several major investigations into corruption allegations and has been linked to bribery and money laundering charges. In December 2020, he was arrested in a police operation and charged by the special prosecutor's office with money laundering and other offenses related to the Gorilla scandal, prompting him to resign from his position as CEO of Penta. In January 2021, the Supreme Court ordered Haščák's release, as there were insufficient grounds for detention. However, the Attorney General's Office dropped the investigation against him in August 2021 because no reliable evidence was found. Haščák welcomed this decision as confirmation of his innocence. The Slovak state publicly apologized for his previous detention in 2022.

In December 2022, charges where again brought against Haščák and several other individuals for forming a criminal organization and money laundering in the Gorilla affair. However, the case was dropped in January 2024. In 2025, the country's Supreme Court ruled that the Slovak intelligence service must destroy all recordings of Haščák's conversations from the 2000s.

Another controversial contact was with businessman Marian Kočner, who was later charged with the murder of journalist Ján Kuciak. Kočner was a repeat customer of Penta (he had invested large sums of money and was a client of a Penta bank). Haščák stated that Kočner had contacted him in 2018 with a request to influence Penta's media coverage in Kočner's favor, but that Haščák had rejected this request. He emphasized that he had no knowledge of Kočner's murder plans and that a threatening message from Kočner did not refer to the murdered Kuciak, but to an intelligence investigator in the "Gorilla" affair.

== Private life ==
Haščák is married to Valéria Haščáková, who works as a commercial lawyer. The couple has two sons. In 2021, Haščák transferred his stake in the Penta Group to a family trust called “T69.” The beneficiaries of this trust are his wife Valéria and their two minor sons. Valéria Haščáková acts as the administrator and beneficiary of this fund.

As a private individual, Haščák largely keeps out of the public eye. He is known to speak fluent English, Russian, and Chinese (due to his studies). Haščák's large donation to his Moscow alma mater is also public knowledge: in 2013, he transferred a large sum to the scholarship fund of his former MGIMO degree program.
