= 2012 Slovak parliamentary election =

- 10 March 2012

All 150 seats in the National Council 76 seats needed for a majority
- Turnout: 58.90% (▲0.25 pp)
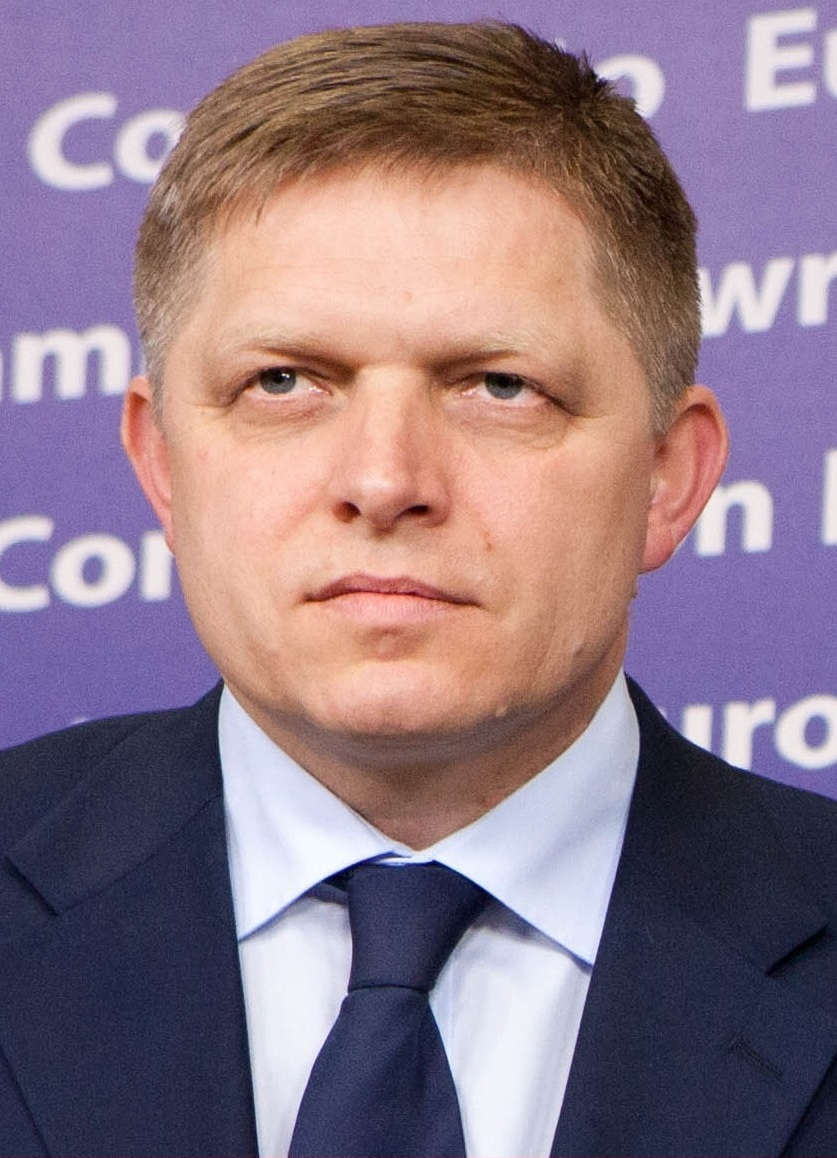

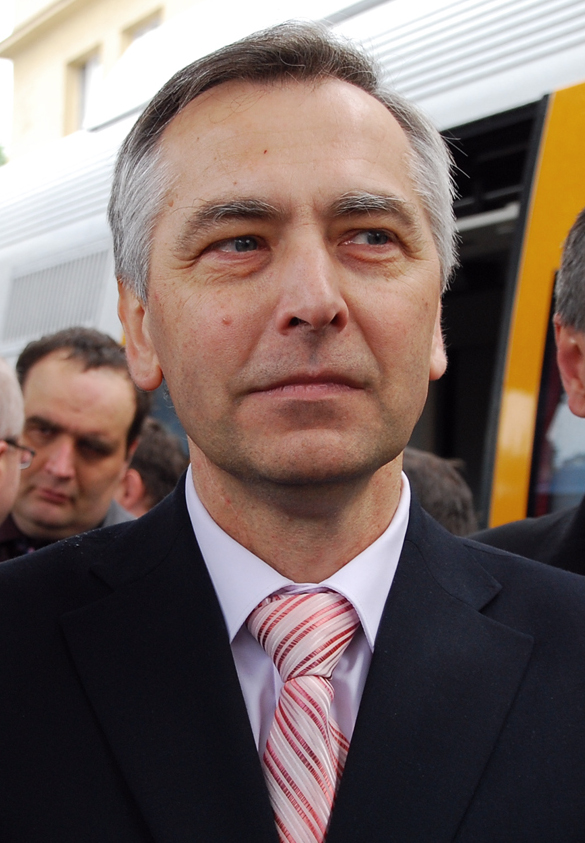

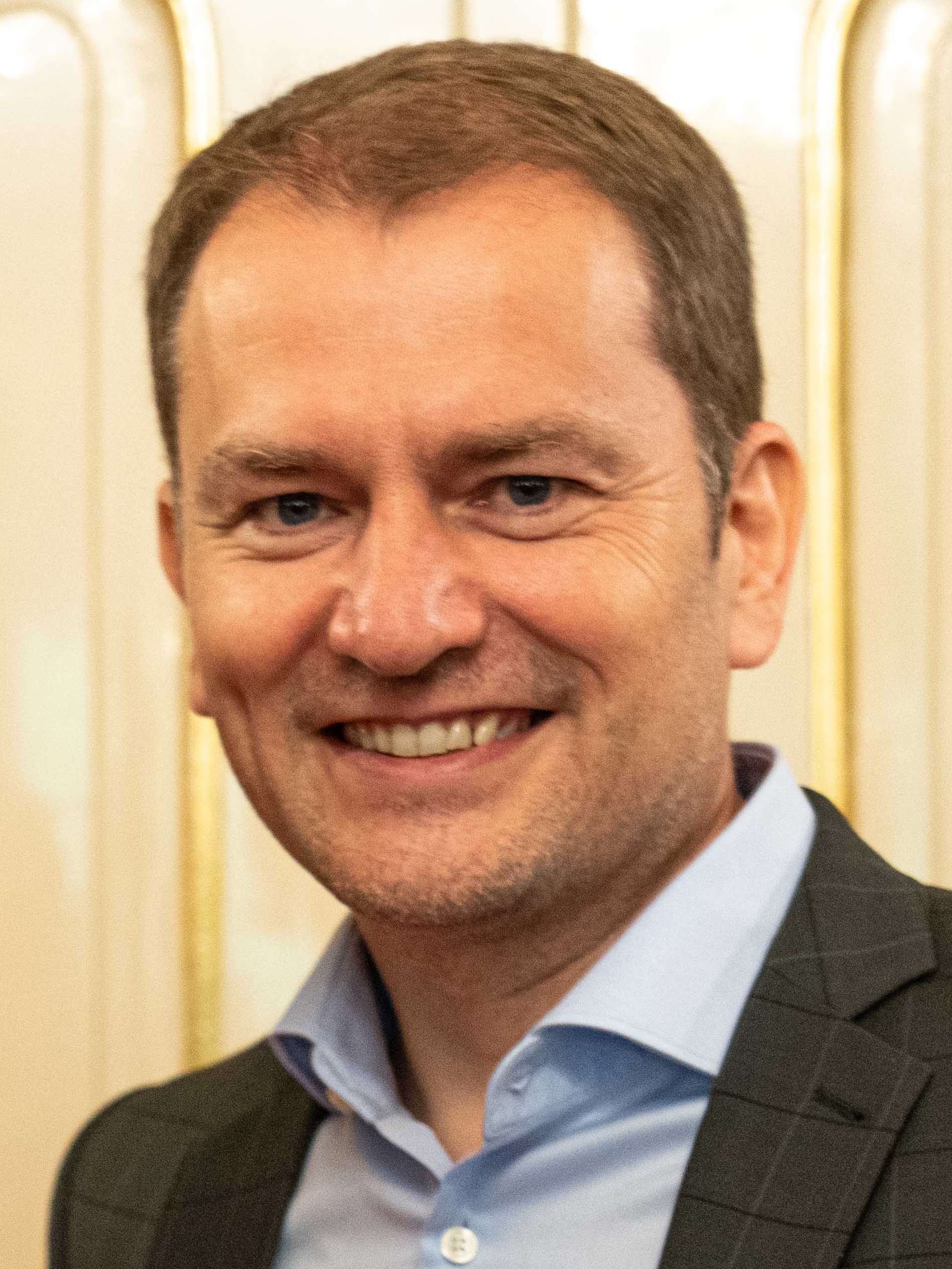

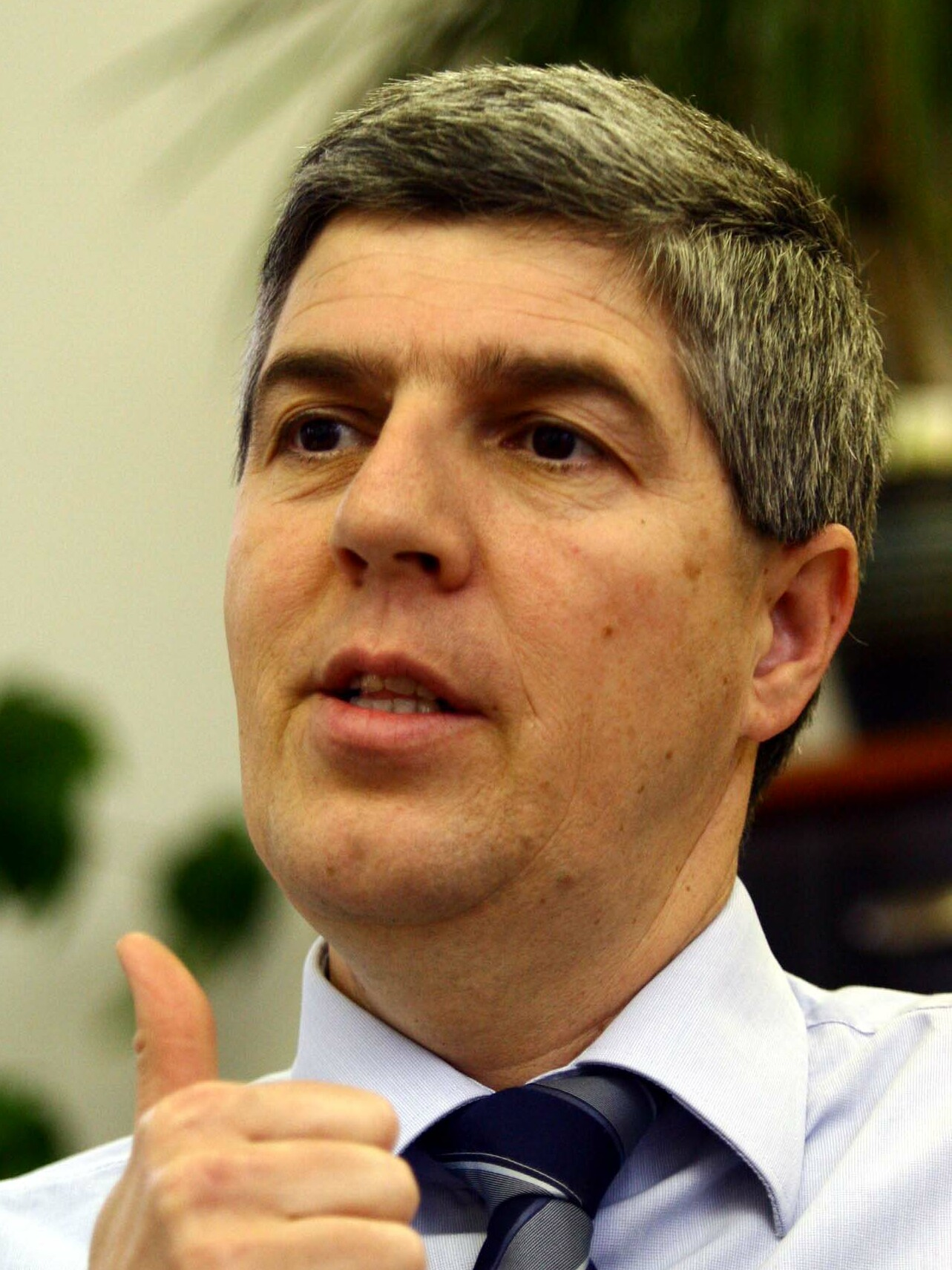

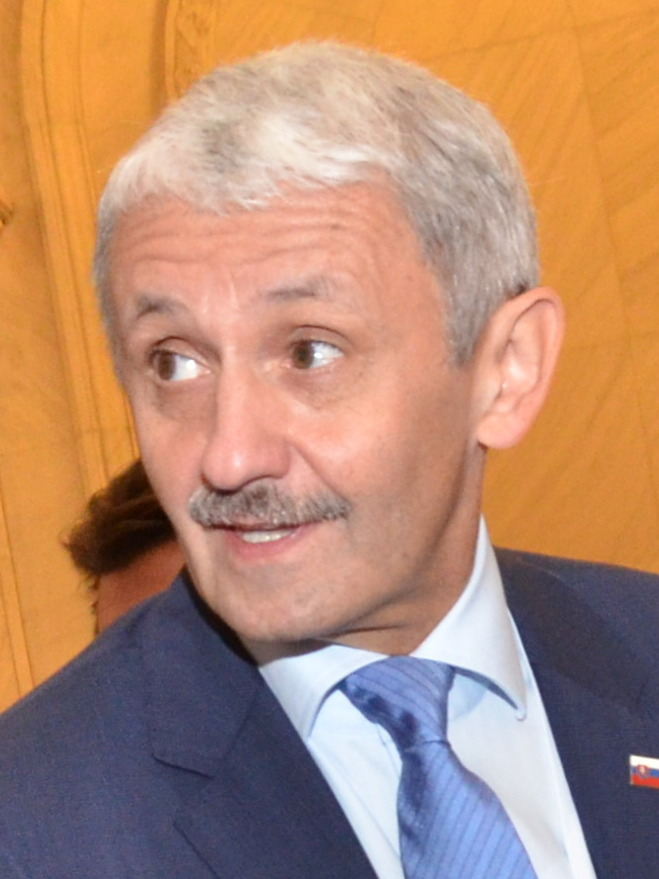

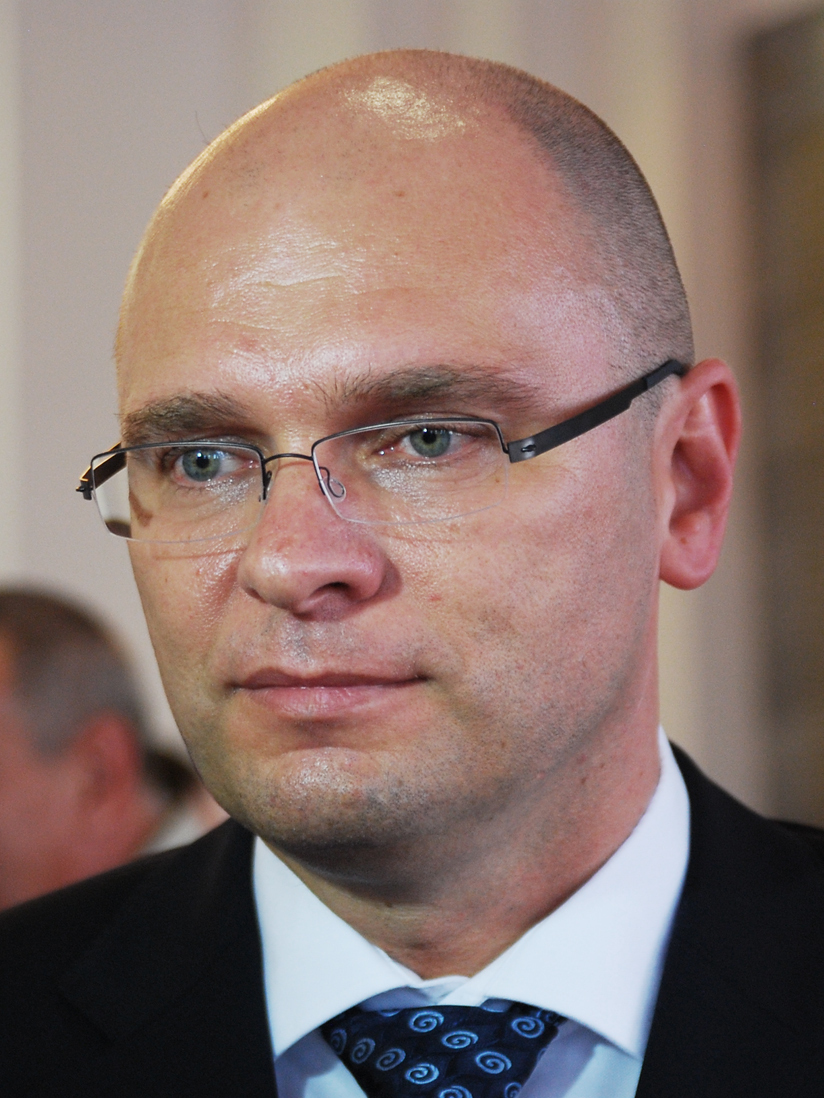
	First party	Second party	Third party
Leader	Robert Fico	Ján Figeľ	Igor Matovič
Party	Smer	KDH	OĽaNO
Last election	62 seats, 34.79%	15 seats, 8.52%	Did not exist
Seats won	83	16	16
Seat change	▲21	▲1	New
Popular vote	1,134,280	225,361	218,537
Percentage	44.41%	8.82%	8.55%
Swing	▲9.62 pp	▲0.30 pp	New
	Fourth party	Fifth party	Sixth party
Leader	Béla Bugár	Mikuláš Dzurinda	Richard Sulík
Party	Most–Híd	SDKÚ–DS	SaS
Last election	14 seats, 8.12%	28 seats, 15.42%	22 seats, 12.14%
Seats won	13	11	11
Seat change	▼1	▼17	▼11
Popular vote	176,088	155,744	150,266
Percentage	6.90%	6.09%	5.88%
Swing	▼1.22 pp	▼9.33 pp	▼6.26 pp
- Results of the election, showing vote strength by district
Prime Minister before election
Iveta Radičová
SDKÚ–DS
Elected Prime Minister
Robert Fico
Smer

Parliamentary elections were held in Slovakia on 10 March 2012 to elect the 150 members of the National Council. The elections followed the fall of Prime Minister Iveta Radičová's Slovak Democratic and Christian Union – Democratic Party-led coalition in October 2011 over a no confidence vote her government had lost because of its support for the European Financial Stability Fund. Amidst a major corruption scandal involving local center-right politicians, former Prime Minister Robert Fico's Direction – Social Democracy won an absolute majority of seats.

== Background ==
On 11 October 2011, the National Council of the Slovak Republic, the parliament of Slovakia, voted on whether to approve the expansion of the European Financial Stability Fund. As Slovakia was the last eurozone country to vote on the measure, prime minister Iveta Radičová of the Slovak Democratic and Christian Union – Democratic Party (SDKÚ) made it a vote of confidence. The motion was called on the grounds, according to the Freedom and Solidarity (SaS) party, that Slovakia, the second poorest eurozone country, should not bail out richer countries such as Greece in the interest of bank re-capitalisation. The motion then failed by 21 votes after SaS and Direction – Social Democracy (Smer–SD) abstained.

Smer-SD then came to an agreement with the governing coalition to support the measure in what party chairman and former prime minister Robert Fico called "the most important document of this period." He also explained the first round rejection of the measure as "saying 'no' to a rightist government, but we're saying 'yes' to the rescue fund." As per the agreement between the two parties, foreign minister Mikuláš Dzurinda (SDKÚ) said that, in return for Smer's support, a snap election would be called: "We decided that as the first point of [Thursday's] parliamentary session, we will work on a proposal to shorten the voting period, with the goal of organising an election on 10 March. Immediately after [13 October or 14 October] we will debate proposals related to the EFSF." On 13 October, following pressure from the European Union, which was in turn warned by the United States and China to get its finances in order, the motion was passed by a vote of 114–30 with 3 abstentions.

== Participating parties ==
Party	Ideology	Political position	Leader
Direction – Social Democracy (Smer)	Social democracy Left-wing populism	Centre-left	Robert Fico
Christian Democratic Movement (KDH)	Christian democracy Social conservatism	Centre-right	Ján Figeľ
Ordinary People and Independent Personalities (OĽaNO)	Populism; Anti-corruption	Centre	Igor Matovič
Bridge (Most–Híd)	Hungarian minority interests Christian democracy	Centre-right	Béla Bugár
Slovak Democratic and Christian Union – Democratic Party (SDKÚ–DS)	Liberal conservatism Christian democracy	Centre-right	Mikuláš Dzurinda
Freedom and Solidarity (SaS)	Liberalism; Right-libertarianism	Centre-right	Richard Sulík

== Campaign ==
The number of competing political parties in the 2012 elections was the highest since the fall of communism in Slovakia in 1989. All participating parties had to register 90 days before the election and pay a fee of 16 596 euro (the fee is refunded to all parties who reach at least 2% of votes). All Slovak citizens are allowed to vote except for convicted felons in prison (only those, who were convicted for serious offenses), people declared ineligible to perform legal acts (legally insane) by court and citizens under 18 years of age.

Numerous political scandals overshadowed the economic issues which led to the fall of the previous government:

- Controversial wiretapping by the Military Defense Intelligence (VOS) (The controversy is not of the wiretapping itself, but of evidence discovered during the wiretapping implicating the Governing Coalition 1998-2006 2010-2012 of major corruption)
- Gorilla scandal – a major political scandal surrounding corruption at the highest level in the government

In the run-up to the elections the Gorilla scandal (secret recordings of leading politicians in 2005–2006 showing political corruption) shook the political scene.

The campaign was openly criticised for being the first one since the fall of communism in which political scandals and personal attacks replaced policy discussion. An open declaration condemning the campaign was signed by 16 prominent Slovaks, including economist Juraj Stern, actor Milan Lasica and sociologist Martin Bútora. The campaign officially started on 18 February and continued up to, and including, election day.

== Opinion polls ==
In January 2012, polls projected that a new centre-right party, Ordinary People, would enter the National Council.

Party	Last election	September 2011	October 2011	November 2011	December 2011	January 2012	February 2012	March 2012
Smer	34.8% (62)	43.1% (70)	43.5%	45.2% (79)	43.9% (74)	41.8% (81)	37.3% (69)	40% (73)
KDH	8.5% (15)	9.0% (15)	9.7%	9.9% (17)	10.0% (17)	9.3% (18)	10.3% (19)	12% (22)
Most–Híd	8.1% (14)	5.9% (9)	6.9%	7.0% (12)	8.3% (14)	6.4% (13)	6.0% (11)	7% (13)
SDKÚ-DS	15.4% (28)	12.8% (21)	12.2%	11.3% (20)	10.2% (17)	8.3% (16)	6.1% (11)	6% (11)
SaS	12.1% (22)	8.0% (13)	8.2%	5.6% (13)	7.5% (9)	6.4% (12)	5.9% (11)	6% (11)
OL	part of SaS list	–	–	2.9%	5.8% (10)	5.2% (10)	8.9% (16)	5.5% (10)
SMK-MKP	4.3%	5.3% (8)	4.2%	3.6%	2.8%	3.4%	2.4%	5.5% (10)
SNS	5.1% (9)	8.5% (14)	6.4%	5.4% (9)	5.6% (9)	4.8%	4.2%	4.5%
99%	-	–	–	–	–	4.6%	6.9% (13)	4%
ĽS-HZDS	4.3%	3.0%	4.7%	2.5%	2.1%	1.5%	1.8%	1.5%
Others	7.2%	4.4%	4.3%	4.7%	5.7%	8.3%	6.7%	
Source: Focus Research								MVK

== Conduct ==
The day before the election, about 1,000 protesters in Bratislava, the national capital, protested against the corruption brought to light by the Gorilla scandal, which later turned violent.

Voting took place between 7:00 and 22:00 at 5,956 polling stations. The Slovak Spectator reported that former Slovak citizens who had been granted Hungarian citizenship were prevented from voting because of an amendment to the Citizenship Act in 2010 which mandated that those who acquire citizenship of another country automatically have their Slovak citizenship rescinded.

== Results ==
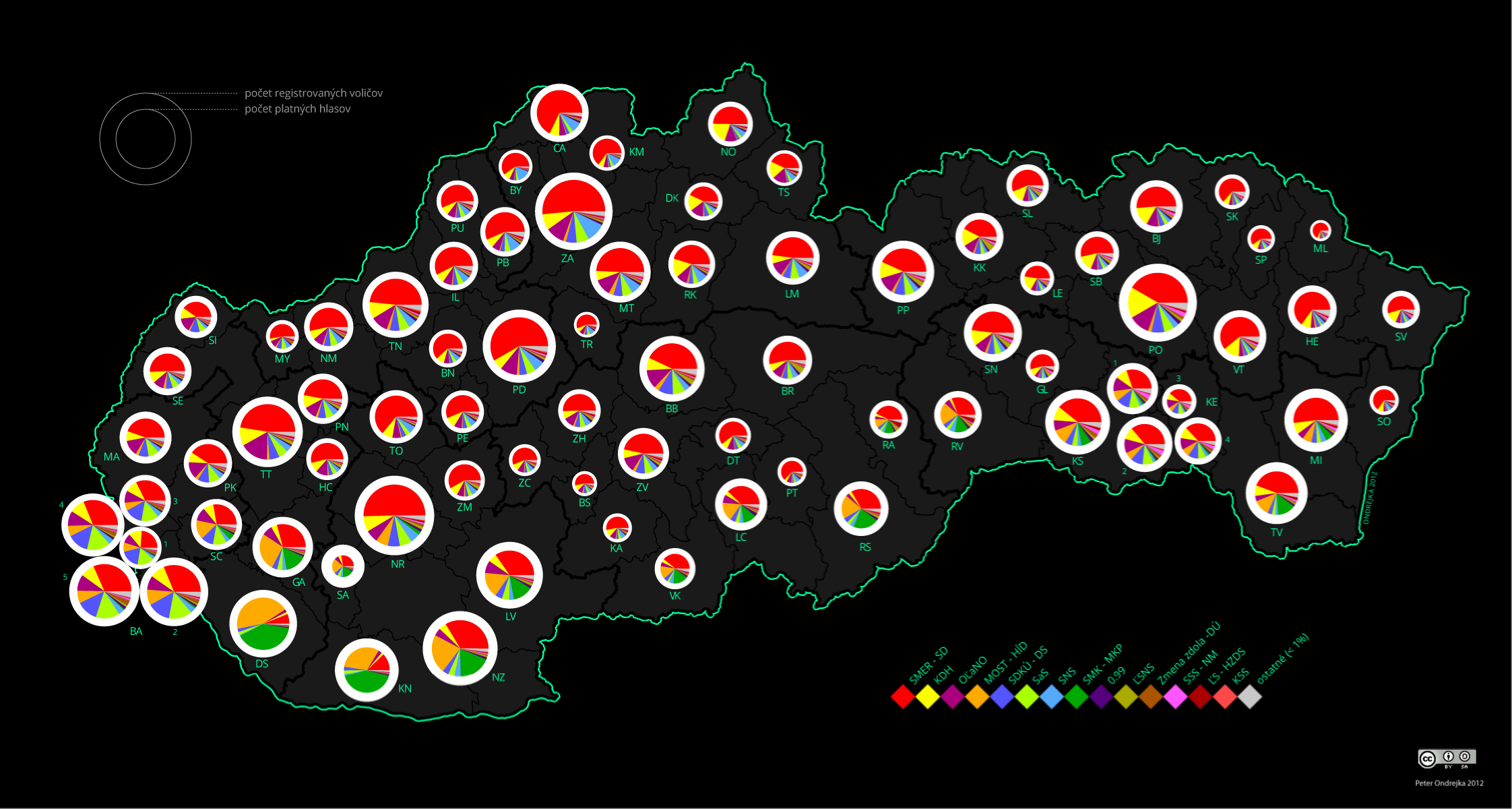
Breakdown of results by voteshare in each district.

Party	Votes	%	+/–	Seats	+/–
Direction – Social Democracy	1,134,280	44.42	+9.63	83	+21
Christian Democratic Movement	225,361	8.82	+0.30	16	+1
Ordinary People and Independent Personalities	218,537	8.56	New	16	New
Most–Híd	176,088	6.90	–1.22	13	–1
Slovak Democratic and Christian Union – Democratic Party	155,744	6.10	–9.32	11	–17
Freedom and Solidarity	150,266	5.88	–6.26	11	–11
Slovak National Party	116,420	4.56	–0.51	0	–9
Party of the Hungarian Community	109,483	4.29	–0.04	0	0
99% – Civic Voice	40,488	1.59	New	0	New
People's Party Our Slovakia	40,460	1.58	+0.25	0	0
Zmena zdola	33,155	1.30	New	0	New
Party of Freedom of Speech – Nora Mojsejová	31,159	1.22	New	0	New
People's Party – Movement for a Democratic Slovakia	23,772	0.93	–3.39	0	0
Communist Party of Slovakia	18,583	0.73	–0.10	0	0
Nation and Justice – Our party	16,234	0.64	New	0	New
Green Party	10,832	0.42	New	0	New
Law and Justice	10,604	0.42	New	0	New
Free Forum	8,908	0.35	New	0	New
Greens	7,860	0.31	+0.18	0	0
Our Region	4,859	0.19	New	0	New
Party of the Democratic Left	4,844	0.19	–2.24	0	0
Ordinary People	4,320	0.17	New	0	New
Party of Self-Employed of Slovakia	3,963	0.16	New	0	New
Party of Citizens of Slovakia	3,836	0.15	New	0	New
Party of Roma Union of Slovakia	2,891	0.11	New	0	New
Party +1 Voice	779	0.03	New	0	New
Total	2,553,726	100.00	–	150	0
Valid votes	2,553,726	98.71			
Invalid/blank votes	33,472	1.29			
Total votes	2,587,198	100.00			
Registered voters/turnout	4,392,451	58.90			
Source: Volby

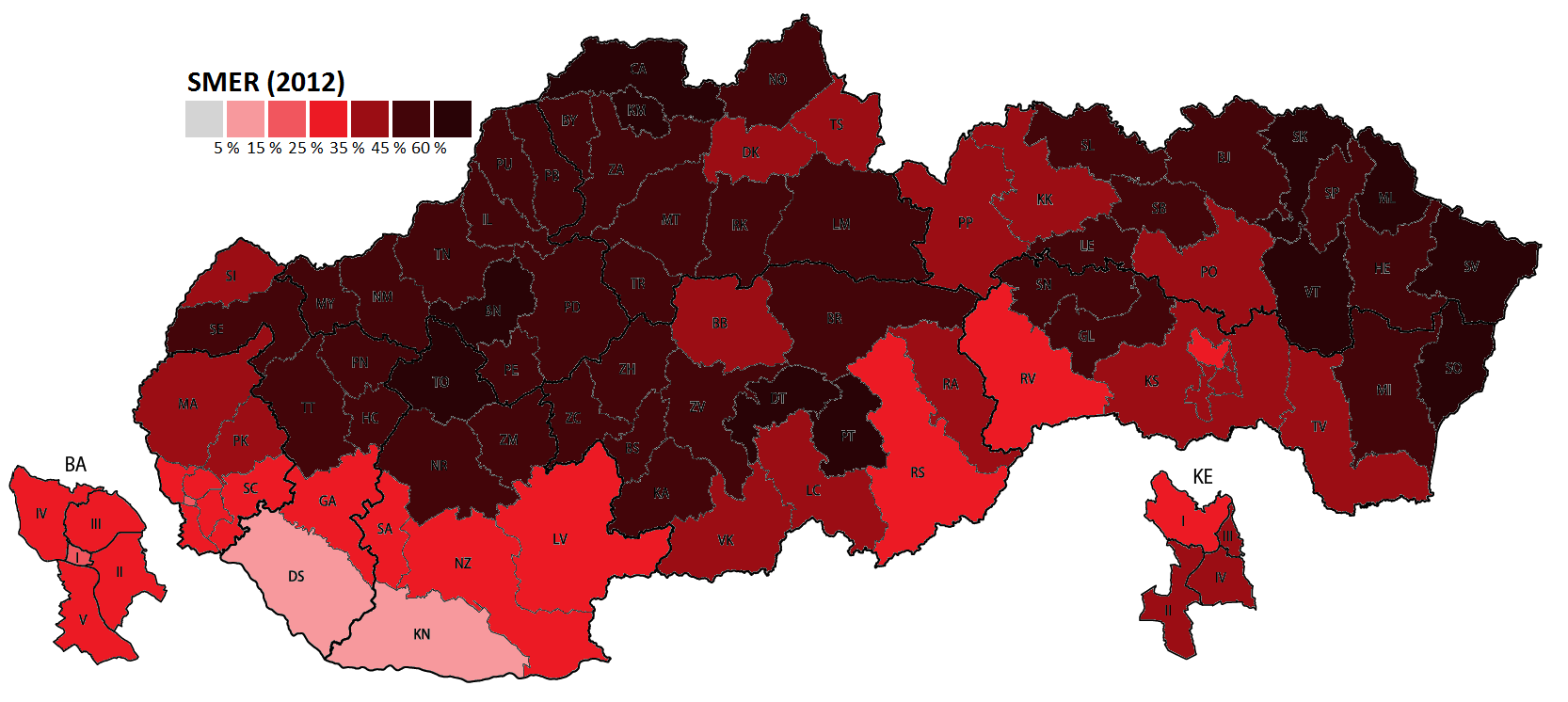
Smer

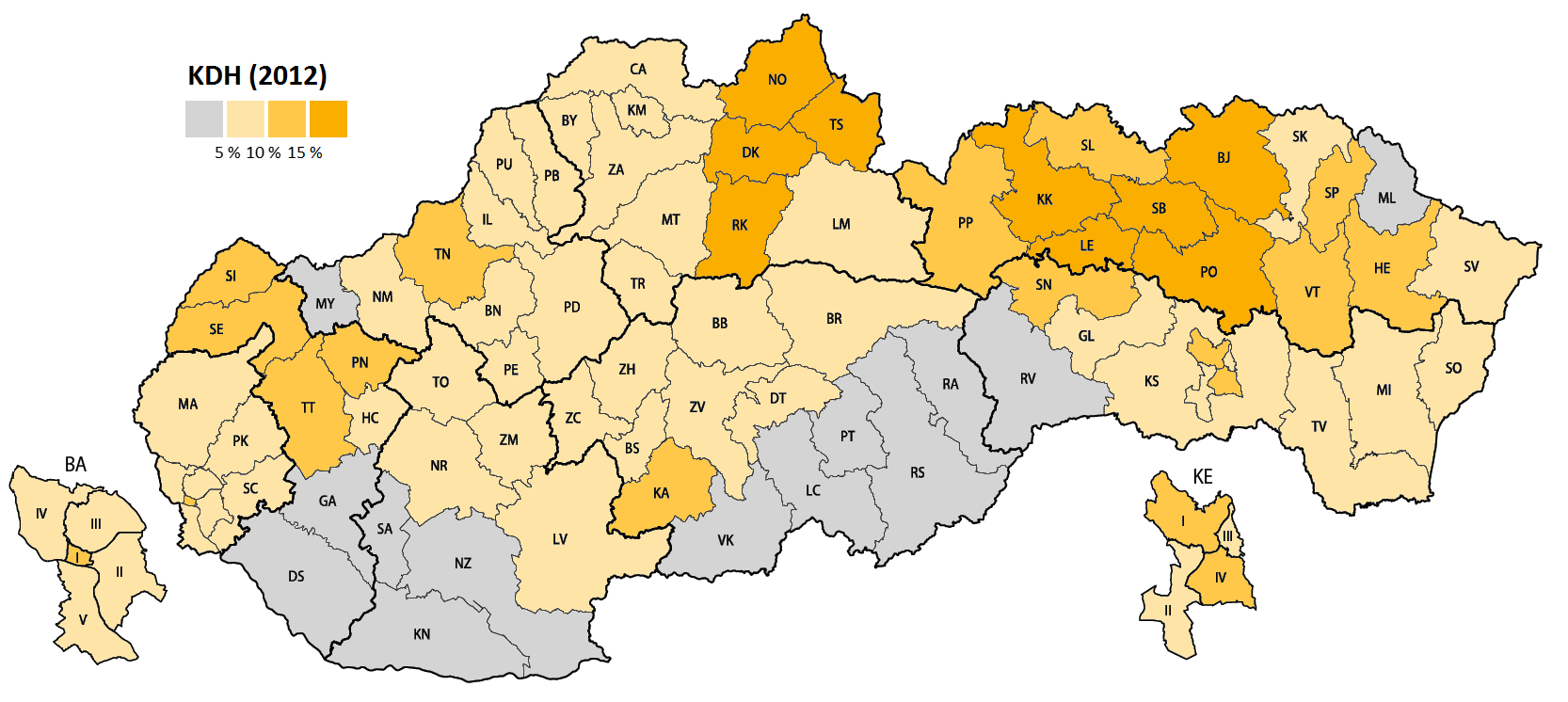
KDH

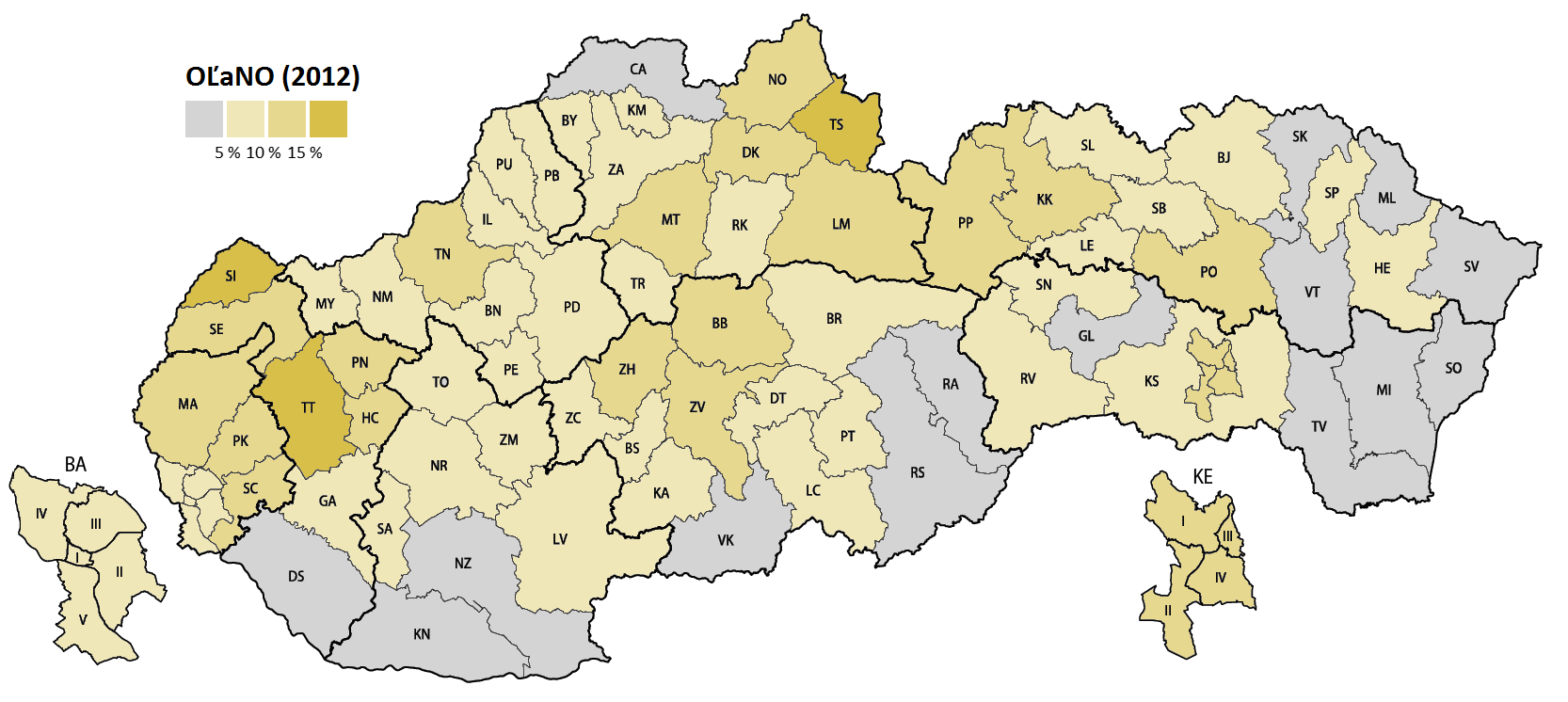
OĽANO

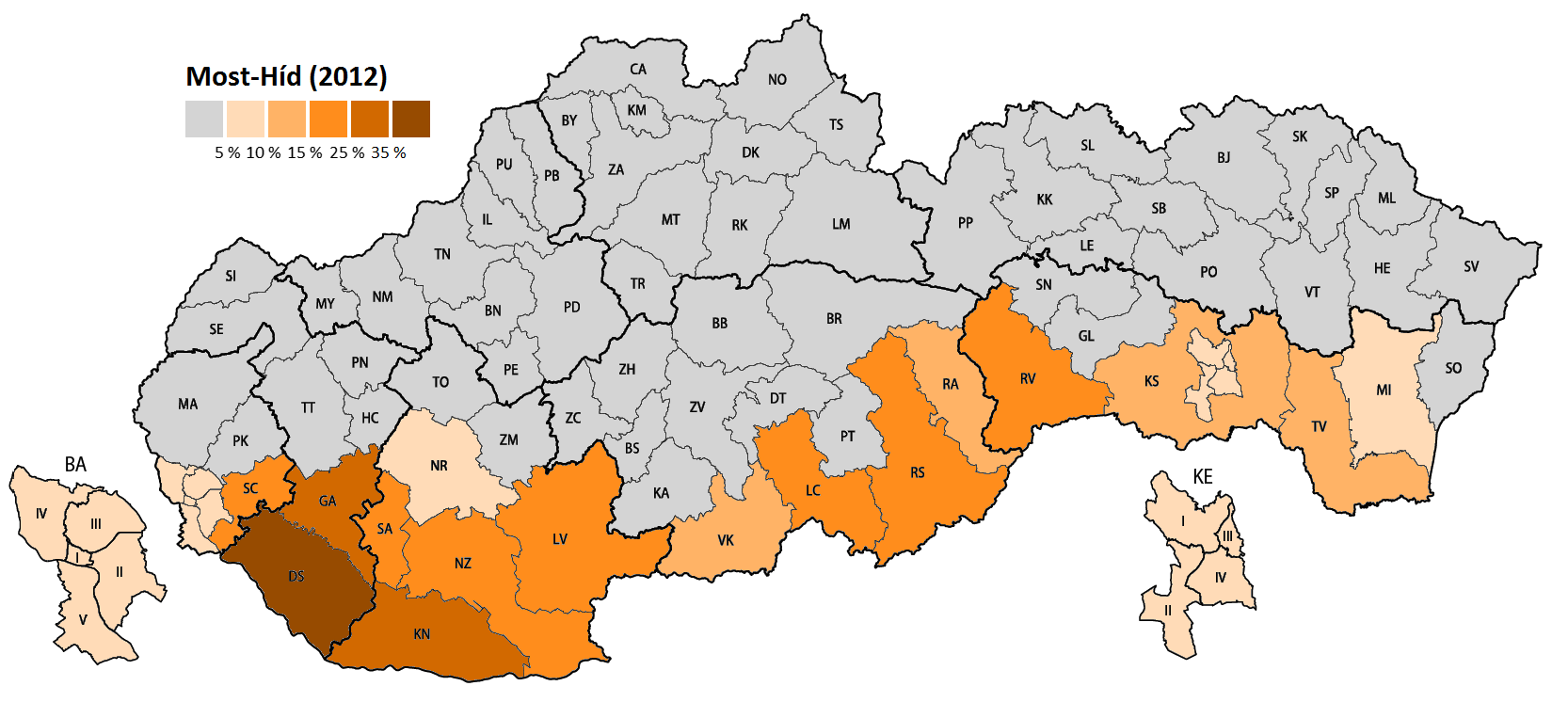
Most-Híd

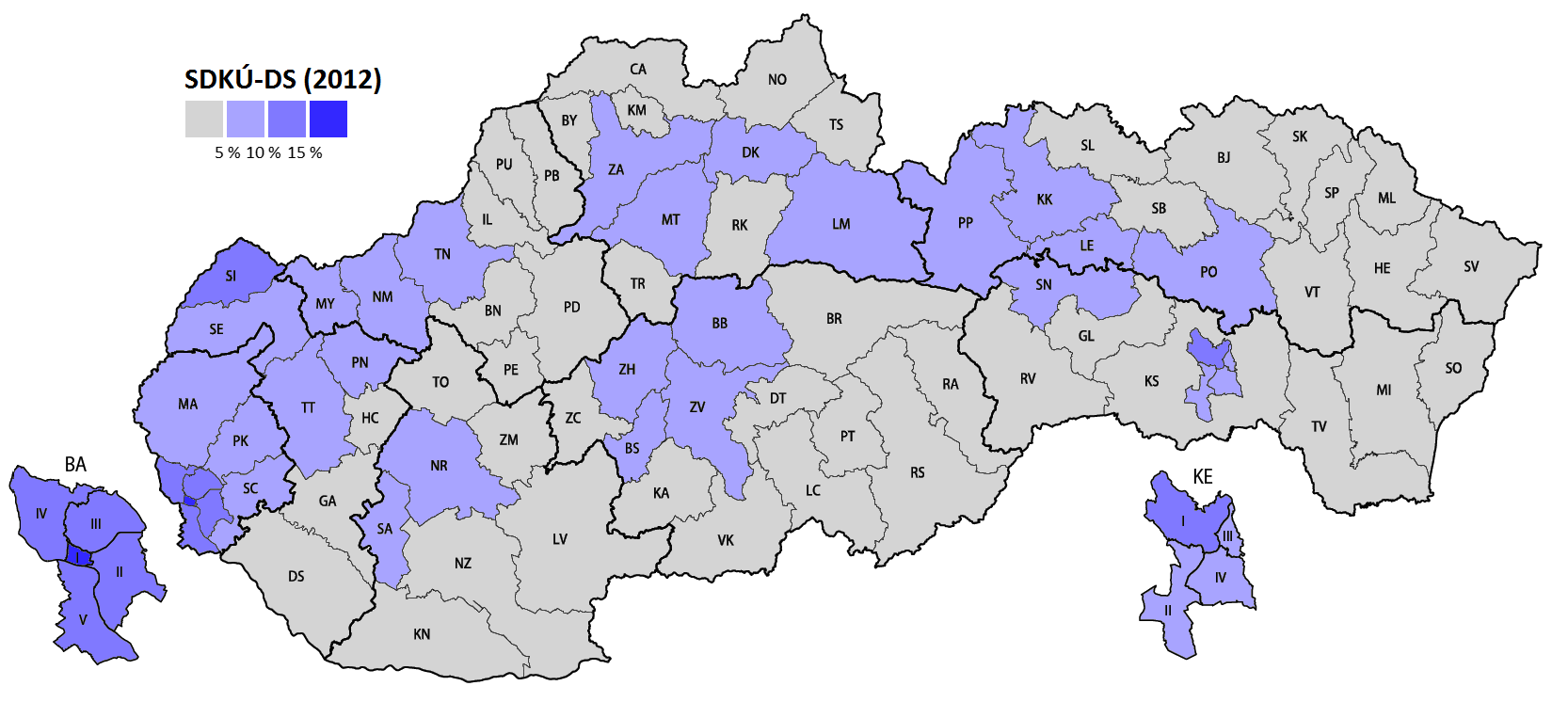
SDKÚ-DS

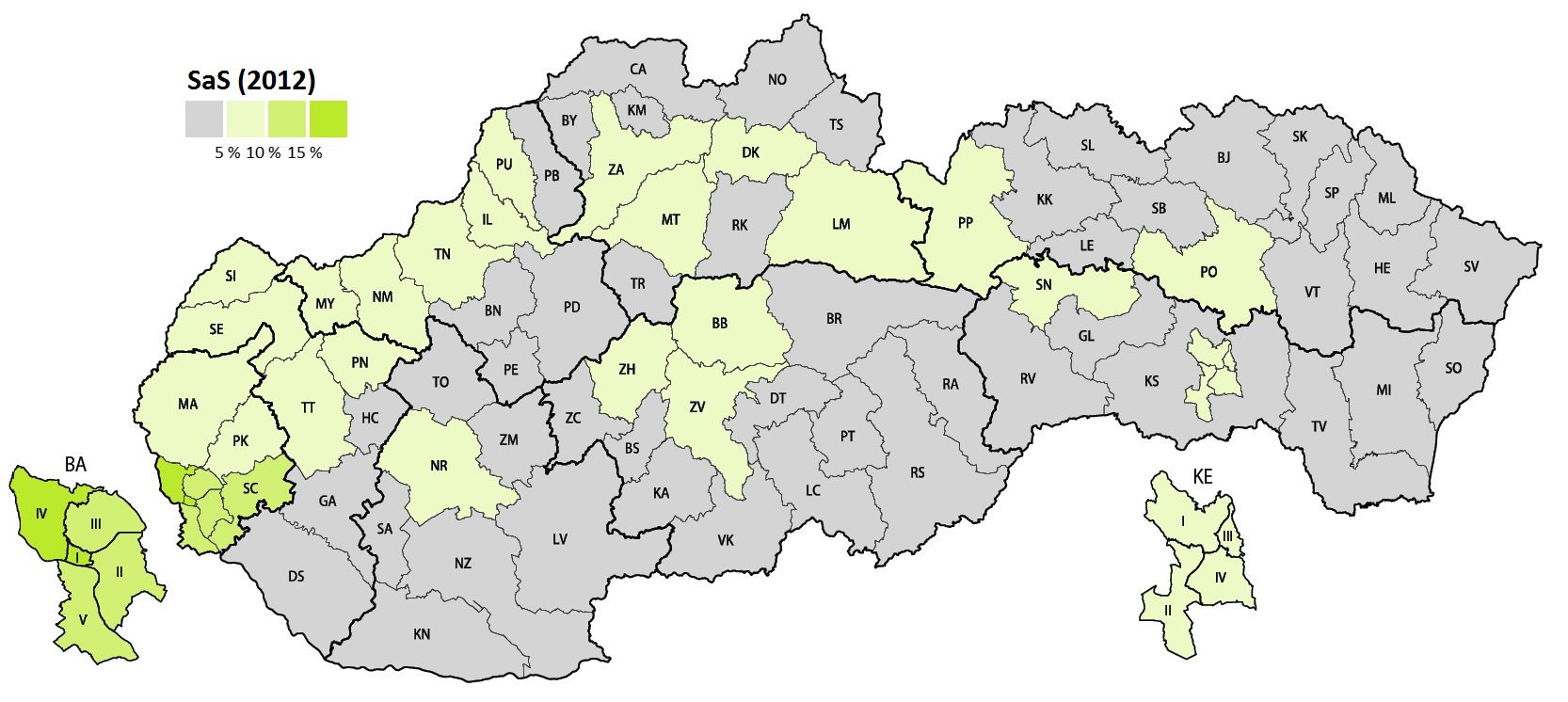
SaS

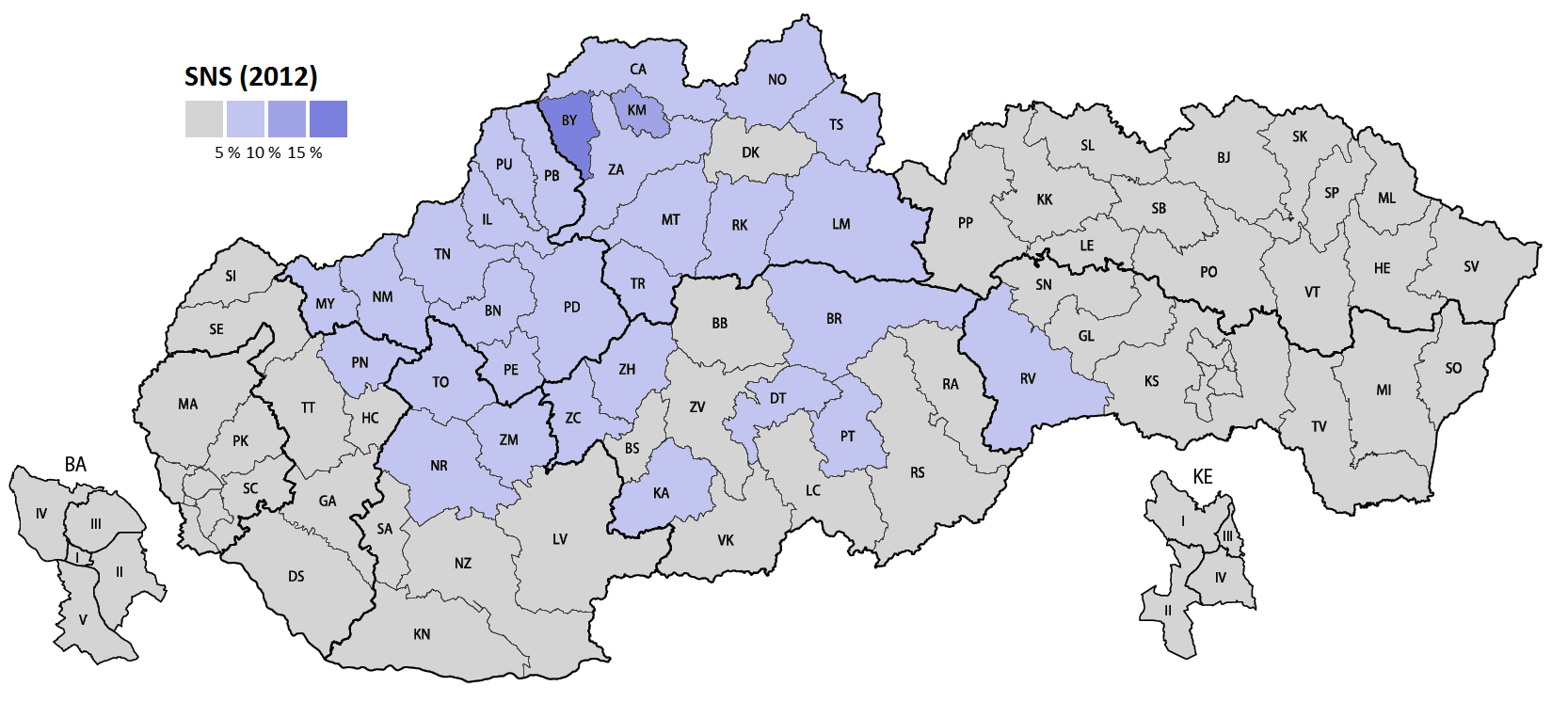
SNS

== Reactions ==
Although Direction won an absolute majority, Fico announced on election night that he would be willing to consult with other parties if they so wished. He also said that: "The European Union can lean on Smer because we realise that Slovakia, as a small country living in Europe and wanting to live in Europe ... desires to maintain the eurozone and the euro as a strong European currency." However, no other parties were willing to form coalition with Smer, leading Fico to form the first one-party government in Slovakia since 1993.

== Analysis ==
The Economist called Fico "one of Europe's most successful centre-left politicians" after Smer-SD's win. It suggested that the "big loser" was the SDKÚ-DS' Dzurinda as a former prime minister "barely squeaked" into parliament and that, along with the SaS, were punished by voters for their failure to support the previous government's EU-backed Greek bailout. It further cited the high voter turnout (59.1) saying that Slovaks had "matured politically" for not abstaining or threatening to invalidate the poll, yet it still cited smaller protests that were "rowdy." It pointed to the OLaNO's newcomer status as "starry-eyed" in attempting to "harness voters' discontent" and that as a result of the party's showing it would be "breathing down KDH's neck." The Economist pointed out that this was the first time since the breakup of Czechoslovakia that any party had won an absolute majority, though Smer-SD fell seven seats short of the three-fifths majority needed to unilaterally amend the constitution.

== See also ==
- List of members of the National Council of Slovakia (2012–16)
