= Penta Investments =

Slovak investment group founded in 1994

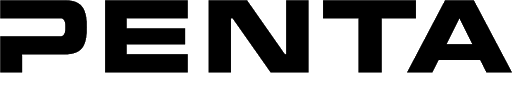
- Type: Private Limited Company
- Industry: private equity firm
- Founded: Slovakia (1994)
- Headquarters: Bratislava, Prague, Warsaw, Limassol, Amsterdam, Jersey, Munich
- Key people: Marek Dospiva, Jaroslav Haščák, Iain Child, Eduard Maták, Jozef Oravkin (alphabetical)
- Revenue: 361,393,000 (2017)
- Operating income: 281,944,000 (2017)
- Net income: 236,176,000 (2017)
- Total assets: 3,089,058,000 (2017)
- Number of employees: 200 (37,000 through companies in its portfolio)
- Website: www.pentainvestments.com/en

Penta is a Central Europe investment group founded in 1994 in Slovakia by Czech Marek Dospiva and Slovaks Jaroslav Haščák, Juraj Herko, Martin Kúšik and Jozef Oravkin.

Today, the group actively develops companies and projects, primarily in healthcare, financial services, retail, manufacturing, real estate and media. Having grown from a local to international company, Penta operates in more than ten markets across Europe, providing more than 37,000 jobs through investee companies. In financial year 2015, Penta achieved a consolidated net profit of EUR 200 mln and increased total portfolio assets to EUR 7 bln.

The name Penta is a tribute to the original five founding partners, all schoolmates during their studies in Moscow and Czechoslovakia.

Penta Investments group and its co-owner Jaroslav Haščák have been associated with the Gorilla scandal, a corruption affair that erupted in Slovakia in 2012. The company has been denying the allegations and interpreted the "Gorilla" file as fabricated. In 2012, the Constitutional Court ruled that wiretapping of Slovak secret service was unlawful.

== History ==
Penta's initial capital originated mostly from the business that the two founding members, Marek Dospiva and Jaroslav Haščák, conducted in China. In 1990, during their studies in Beijing, they founded a small textile importing company consisting only of two accountants and one secretary and began importing Chinese textiles to chain stores in Czechoslovakia. At the end of 1993, Marek Dospiva, Jaroslav Haščák and Jozef Oravkin teamed up with Martin Kúšik and Juraj Herko and founded company Penta Brokers.

In 1996, when the company's net asset value was approximately 50 million Slovak crowns, Penta gained control over VÚB Kupón – the largest investment fund in Slovakia, with an asset value of 9 billion Slovak crowns. Penta convinced the British Regents Fund to purchase a control block of stock of VÚB Kupón. During the transaction, VÚB, the founding bank of the fund, started to resist. The British Regents Fund decided to pull out of the transaction. At this key moment, Penta succeeded in convincing VÚB to sell its share and finance the purchase of stocks bought by the British fund. Penta gained control over VÚB Kupón for a stock price of only 20 percent of its real market value. VÚB Kupón's acquisition opened the way for Penta to earn its first billion.

In 1999, Penta was restructured into a holding with its mother company in Cyprus. In the four years that followed, it realised several restructurings and investment transactions in Slovakia. These included VSŽ, Slovenská poisťovňa, Slovnaft, Elektrovod, Drôtovňa Hlohovec and Sanitas. In 2002, Juraj Herko left and Jozef Špirko joined as the fifth partner. The same year Penta's net asset value reached 2 billion Slovak crowns.

In 2001, Penta entered the Czech market with the development of its Dr. Max chain of pharmacies, the acquisition and development of Aero Vodochody and the acquisition of SmVaK (North-Moravian sanitation Ostrava). In 2005, Penta has changed its structure to that of a standard private equity company and in the same year started investing also into real estate and expanding into other foreign markets beyond Slovakia and Czech Republic, primarily into Poland through the acquisition of Żabka, the country's largest independent food retail chain with more than 2000 stores, which was completed in the summer of 2007. In 2008 Penta made a major investment into the Hungarian meat industry.

In March 2006 Penta Investments Limited acquired MobilKom, a small telecommunication company with 10 employees. In the following months, MobilKom built wireless CDMA network in the Czech republic. Liabilities of MobilKom increased from CZK 4 million at the end of 2006 to CZK 2,116 million at the end of 2009, with China Development Bank among the largest creditors. In February 2011 Penta sold Mobilkom to the local wireless operator Divenno Holdings Limited. The company was not able to finance its mounting losses and in 2012 asked commercial court to allow restructuring.

In 2005, Penta decided to diversify its portfolio. Apart from its buyout business, Penta decided to invest in real estate. The first move to this market was Bratislava Digital Park, an exclusive administrative complex, which has won prestigious architecture awards in Slovakia and abroad. In 2010 Penta invested into the first real estate project in Prague - Florentinum. Penta has started the construction of exclusive office space in down town Prague.

In recent years the group has succeeded in several major transactions, such as the sale of Zabka Polska, the business development and sale of TES Vsetín and restructuring of bankrupted steel wires manufacturer in Poland – Drumet. Recently, Penta has entered the new market of Germany through the acquisition of the traditional engineering company Gehring Technologies.

Currently, one of the most significant investments in Penta's portfolio is EM&F Group. The company is listed on the Warsaw Stock Exchange and is a leading distributor of media and entertainment products, clothing, shoes, toys and accessories for children, cosmetics as well as language courses. The Group consists of operating and commercial companies and NFI Empik Media & Fashion S.A. as the holding company. EM&F business model is based on four segments: the Empik Group, the Smyk Group, Language Schools and Fashion and Beauty. The Group develops its business model based on own brands and trading concepts, as well as franchised and licensed brands. The EM&F Group companies have been successfully building their strong market position for years, have an extensive retail network and a large, stable customer base. EM&F operates in Poland, Russia, Ukraine, the Czech Republic, Slovakia, Germany and Romania.

In Autumn 2012 Penta announced the sale of its medical laboratories Alpha Medical. Penta had developed Alpha Medical from EUR 2 million sales in 2006 to current 65 million. Over the past five years, the Group acquisition-led growth strategy has seen revenues increase significantly. In this period, Alpha Medical has successfully entered two new countries and has established top five position in all three markets including market leadership in Slovakia and second position in the Czech Republic. The network reached significant efficiency improvement through central procurement, laboratory centralization and personal cost driving. Currently Alpha Medical operates 57 medical laboratories in Slovakia, Czech Republic and Poland.

In 2013 Penta completed its first real estate project in the Czech Republic – the Florentinum office building. The project includes 49,000 gross square meters of offices on 9 floors and 7,500 sq m of retail space. Florentinum's quality architecture has garnered it the highest local and international awards (CEEQA – best office in CEE) and is certified LEED Platinum. A year later the Bory Mall retail centre in Slovakia was completed and Penta started to build a new residential development in the Walter factory brownfield in Prague. Penta entered the Polish real estate market in 2014 and started to prepare a project involving two office buildings in Warsaw.

In 2014 Penta inked a sales and purchase contract to dispose of its stake in PPC Investments, a.s., which is being purchased by a member of ISTROENERGO GROUP, a.s. At the same time, Penta also concluded the sale of NOVES okná, a.s. and PetCenter, a.s. in a management buyout. Since 2014 Penta has been investing in the Slovak media market through its News and Media Holding and Petit Press. In 2015 Penta purchased the Vltava-Labe-Press, Astrosat and Tablet Media companies in the Czech Republic.

In December 2015, Penta bought the Slovak subsidiary of Sberbank.

== Criticism ==
Penta's rise is sometimes seen as exemplary for how Czechoslovakia's Communist Nomenklatura and its offspring have been benefitting from the transition to Capitalism and their resulting grip on power in business and politics today. For several years Penta's chief advisor was Alojz Lorenc, the former Head of the Communist Era Czechoslovak Secret Police (StB).

=== Gorilla Scandal ===
Penta was a major antagonist in Slovakia's so-called Gorilla scandal from 2011 to 2012. The scandal evolved around the publication of transcripts of conversations between high-level business, law enforcement and politics, pointing to dubious deal-making and reminding many of the highly corrupt 1990s. Seemingly they were recorded by Slovakia's intelligence agency. Penta describes them as fabricated. Two figures quoted in and incriminated by the transcripts are former Slovak Prime Minister Robert Fico and Penta founder Jaroslav Haščák.

Amidst cries of censorship and widespread condemnation of international press groups Haščák succeeded to block the publishing of journalist Tom Nicholson's book covering the subject by way of preliminary injunction, until a court overturned the restraining order. In 2012, the Constitutional Court ruled that wiretapping of Slovak secret service was unlawful.

=== Acquisition of Slovak newspaper SME ===
Following the announcement that Penta was going to take over SME, a leading Slovak daily, its publisher, editor-in-chief and 60 members of the editorial staff collectively announced their resignation citing the Gorilla scandal, concerns regarding journalistic freedom and the imminent loss of their readership's trust. Editor-in-chief Matúš Kostolný said "Penta is trying to buy their reputation and I am not going to work for them." SME ranks third amongst dailys in Slovakia in terms of circulation and runs the country's third most-visited internet page.

== Ownership portfolio ==
- BCT 1 (Business Center Tesla 1) (Slovakia)
- BCT 2 (Business Center Tesla 2) (Slovakia)
- Bory Mall (Slovakia)
- SkyPark (Slovakia)
- Digital Park (Slovakia)
- Dôvera health insurance company (Slovakia)
- Dr. Max Pharmacy chain (Poland, Czech Republic, Italy, Slovakia, Romania)
- EMC Medical Institute (Poland)
- EM&F Group (Poland)
- Florentinum (Czech Republic)
- Fortuna Entertainment Group (Poland, Czech Republic, Slovakia)
- Gehring Technologies (Germany)
- Gimborn (Czech Republic and Germany)
- Masaryk Station Investment (Czech Republic)
- News and Media Holding (Slovakia)
- Prima banka Slovakia (Slovakia)
- Privatbanka (Czech Republic, Slovakia)
- ProCare (Slovakia)
- Pri Mýte (Slovakia)
- Rosum (Slovakia)
- 44.7% Slovalco (Slovakia)
- Svet Zdravia (Slovakia)
- Vltava Labe Media (Czech Republic)
- Waltrovka (Czech Republic)

== See also ==
- Economy of Slovakia
- J&T (investment group)
- Privatization in Slovakia
- Slovak political scandals
