= 99% – Civic Voice =

Slovak political party

99% – Civic Voice 99% – občiansky hlas
- Chairperson: Pavel Weiss
- Founded: 6 December 2011
- Dissolved: 5 May 2023
- Headquarters: Klariská 330/1, 811 03, Bratislava
- Membership (2021): 27
- Ideology: Social democracy Left-wing populism Anti-establishment
- Political position: Left-wing
- Colours: Burgundy and white
- National Council: 0 / 150
- European Parliament: 0 / 15

Website
- 99obcianskyhlas.sk

99 Percent – Civic Voice (Slovak: 99% – občiansky hlas, 99%) is a left-wing populist political party in Slovakia inspired by the Occupy Wall Street movement. It is jointly led by manager Alena Dušatková, radio journalist Pavol Pavlík, and lawyer and former police investigator Peter Vačok.

According to opinion polls, the party was expected to gain parliamentary representation in the 2012 parliamentary election; but it failed to do so, with only 1.58% of the vote.

The party's registration turned into a scandal when it was revealed that many of the 16,000 signatures submitted were discovered to be fraudulent. Party had failed to make a political impact in its lifetime. It had de facto dissolved during a de jure renaming proces to Spravodlivosť (Justice) in May 2023 with a complete change in leadership. The party ran under the name and logo of Spravodlivosť in the 2023 Slovak parliamentary election.

== Election results ==
=== National Council ===
Election	Leader	Votes	%	Rank	Seats	+/–	Status
2020	Ivan Weiss	991	0.0%	23rd	0 / 150	New	Extra-parliamentary
2023	Pavel Weiss	1,335	0.0%	22nd	0 / 150	0	Extra-parliamentary

== See also ==
- We are the 99%
