= Slovalco =

Slovak metallurgical company

Coordinates: 48°33′47″N 18°50′51″E

- Company type: Private company
- Industry: aluminium
- Founded: 1993
- Headquarters: Žiar nad Hronom, Slovakia
- Key people: Milan Veselý, CEO
- Products: aluminium products, aluminium alloys
- Revenue: US$426 million (2006)
- Number of employees: 490 (2014)
- Website: http://www.slovalco.sk

Slovalco is a large Slovak metallurgical company that produced 160,000 tonnes of aluminium and alloys per annum.

In 2022, Slovalco laid off most of its 450 employees, citing high energy costs. Instead of concentrating on primary aluminium production, the company re-oriented to remelting with an expected annual output of roughly 75,000 tons. In January 2023, the company shut down the remaining 10 cells, ceasing aluminium production in the city after almost 70 years.

== History ==
- December 1985 - approval of project by the ČSSR's government in Prague;
- March 1986 - know - how contract signed with Hydro Aluminium and start of construction;
- 1987 - carbon plant is finished
- 1989 - potroom is finished
- 1989 - last year of financing from state centralized sources
- 1992 - construction ceases (65% of project complete)
- April 1993 - negotiation with EBRD
- 7 June 1993 - Slovalco is founded
- July 1994 - Slovalco signs a sovereign guaranteed loan agreement with EBRD
- October 1994 - EBRD and Hydro Aluminium become shareholders
- June–December 1995 - the first 172 cells put into operation
- 1996 - full operation of electrolysis - 112,000 tons produced
- August 2003 - 54 additional reduction cells put into operation - 226 cells in operation
- June 2004 - the millionth tonne of aluminium produced

== Ownership ==
Slovalco is owned 44.7% by a Slovak company called Penta Investments while the remaining 55.3% is owned by Norwegian company Hydro Aluminium part of Norsk Hydro based in Oslo, Norway.

== Gallery ==
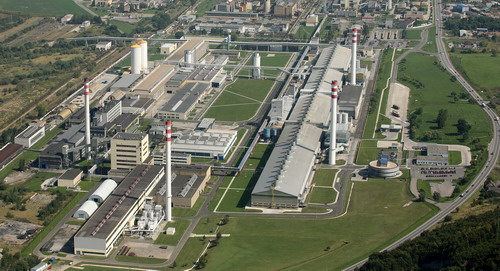
