= List of political scandals in Slovakia =

This is a list of major political scandals in Slovakia (since 1 January, 1993):

Most common name	Date	Summary
FNM Case (Prípad FNM)	1991–1996	In 1996, the Constitutional Court of Slovakia ruled that two of the three methods of privatization used by the National Property Fund (Fond Národného Majetku, FNM) were declared unconstitutional. From 1991 to 1996, FNM sold 1,218 state companies with a book value of 427 billion Slovak crowns ($11.9 billion).
Gaulieder Case (Prípad Gaulieder)	1996–1997	In July 1997, the Constitutional Court of Slovakia ruled that MP František Gaulieder's constitutional rights had been violated when deputies from the leading ruling coalition party, the People's Party – Movement for a Democratic Slovakia (HZDS), led a drive to vote him out of the National Council of the Slovak Republic in December 1996. Gaulieder case was explicitly cited when Slovakia was dropped completely from the list of countries being considered for accession to the European Union at that time.
Noticeboard scandal (Nástenkový tender)	2007	Ministry of Development started a competition to obtain services for 119.5 million euro published only on a small noticeboard in the hallways of the Ministry, in a section inaccessible to the public. The tender was won by companies Zamedia and Avocat close to Ján Slota, head of the Slovak National Party. Office of Public Procurement (ÚVO) declared the competition against the law and Prime Minister Robert Fico recalled Minister of Development Marian Janušek.
Platinum sieves scandal (Kauza platinové sitká)	2011	State Reserves Administration sold platinum sieves worth 2.5 million euro for 667,000 euro to a company close to the Slovak Democratic and Christian Union – Democratic Party, costing the country 1.8 million euro according to the Office of Public Procurement (ÚVO).
VOS wiretapping scandal (Kauza odpočúvanie VOS)	2011	The Military Defense Intelligence (VOS) - one of several secret services in Slovakia - was legally wiretapping journalists, including the editor-in-chief of news TV TA3 Michal Gučík. On 21 November 2011, Slovak media reported that VOS was wiretapping journalists in order to uncover their sources at the Ministry of Defense, one day later Prime Minister Iveta Radičová recalled Minister of Defense Ľubomír Galko. On 20 January 2012 General Prosecutor's Office charged 5 VOS employees (including ex-chief Pavel Brychta) with misusing power while in office.
Gorilla scandal (Kauza Gorila)	2005–2012	Alleged Wiretapping operation by the Slovak Information Service from 2005-2006, raw data based allegedly on wiretap transcriptions leaked to the internet on 21 December 2011, showing political corruption at the highest level. The scandal led to small-scale but nationwide protests and it influenced the results of the Slovak parliamentary election, 2012.
Sasanka scandal (Kauza Sasanka)	2010–2012	On 27 January 2012 SMS messages transcripts between Richard Sulík, leader of the Freedom and Solidarity party and Marián Kočner, who was infamously featured on the Slovak Mafia Lists, leaked to the internet.
99% false signatures scandal (Kauza falošné podpisy 99%)	2011–2012	On 25 November 2011 the newly created political party 99 Percent – Civic Voice delivered 16,000 signatures to the Ministry of Interior in order to be officially registered, which the ministry did on 6 December 2011. In early 2012 numerous media broadcast stories about suspicious signature collecting and on 22 February 2012 Slovak Police started investigating. The Police President Jaroslav Spišiak later confirmed that many signatures were indeed false yet the police did not manage to verify the needed 10,000 signatures before the Slovak parliamentary election, 2012 and the party entered the election nevertheless.

== See also ==
- Politics of Slovakia
- Crime in Slovakia
