= Digital Park =

Building complex in Bratislava, Slovakia

Coordinates: 48°7′49″N 17°6′26″E

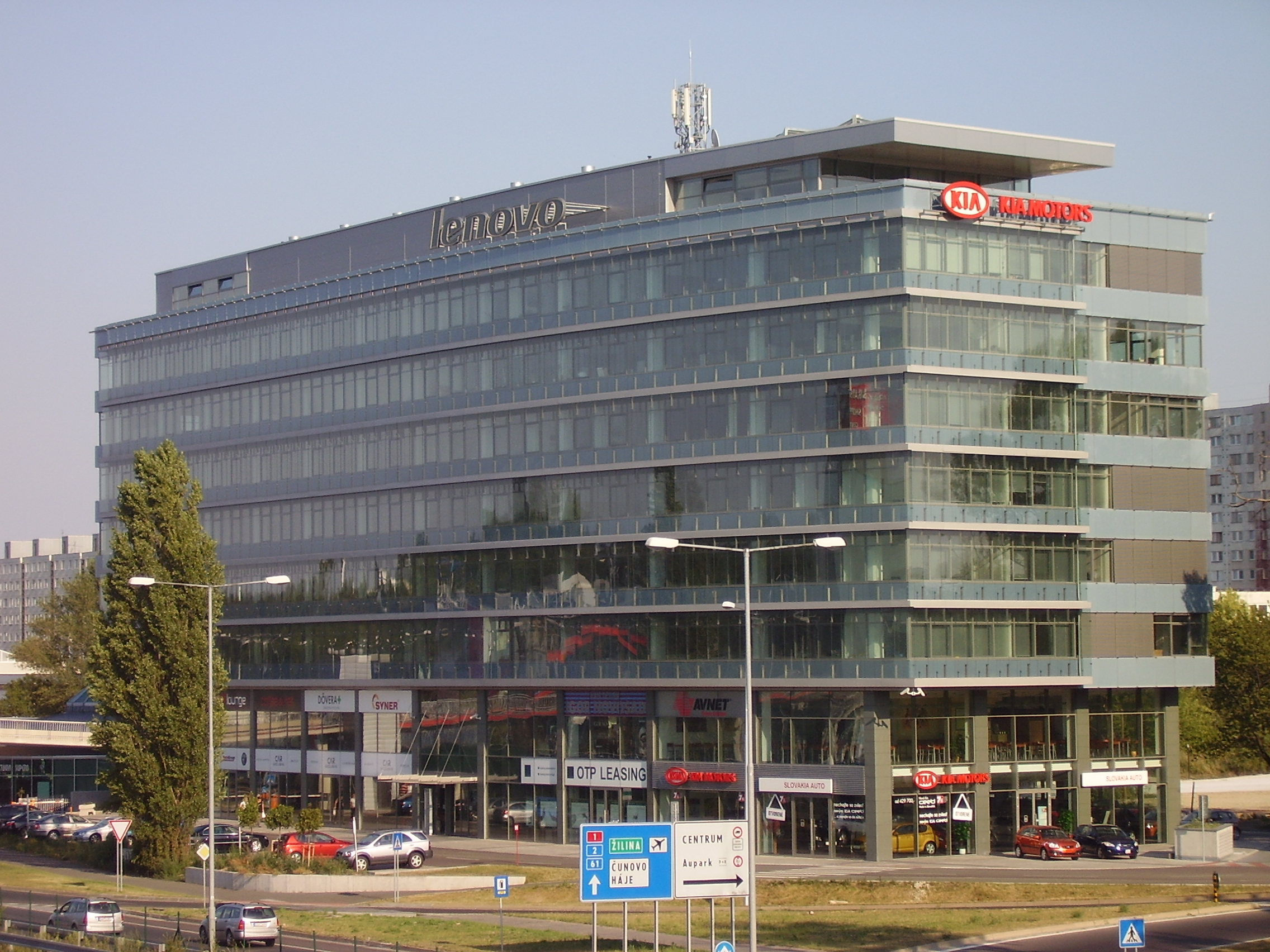
Digital Park

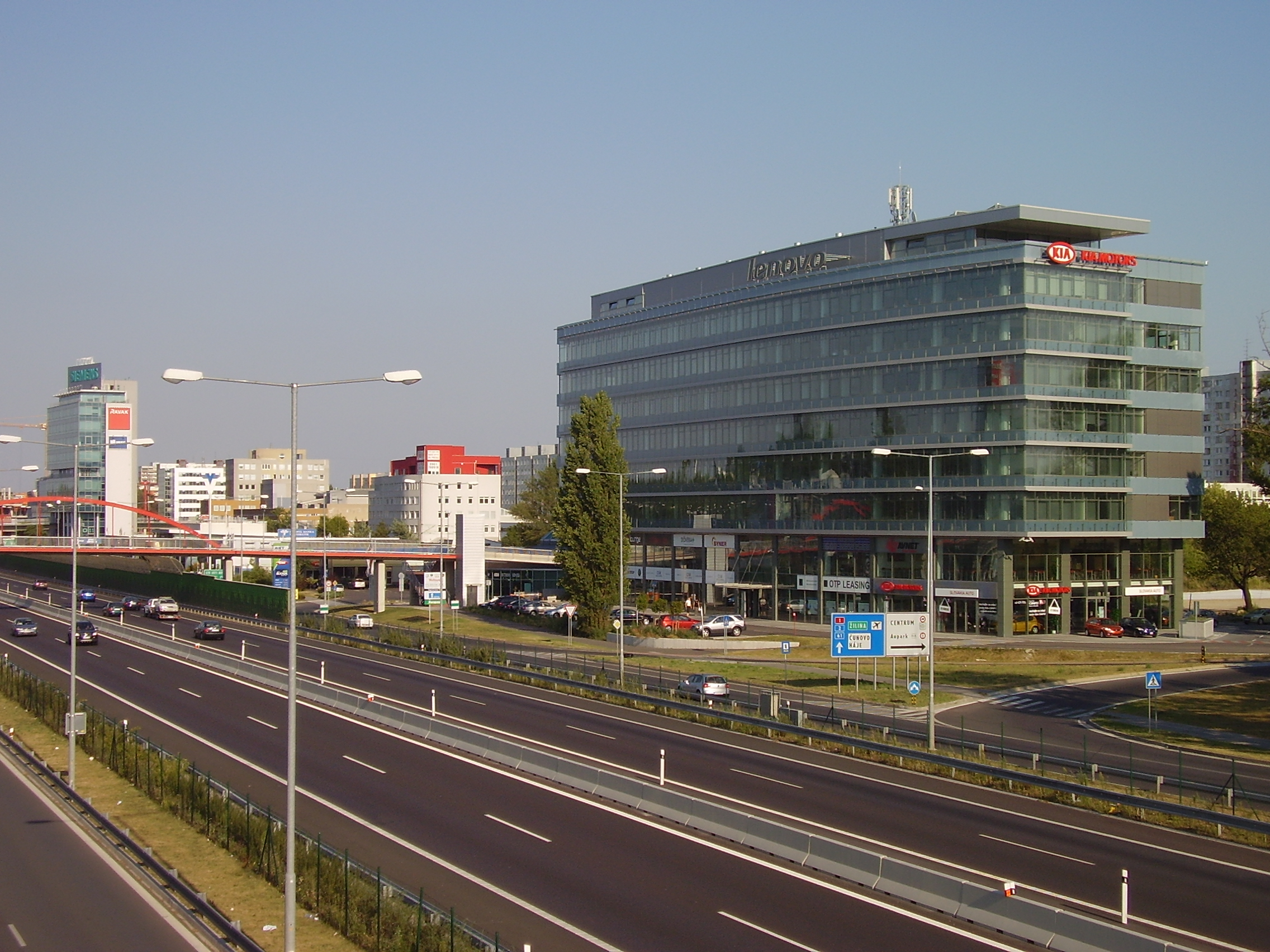
Digital Park and Einsteinova Street

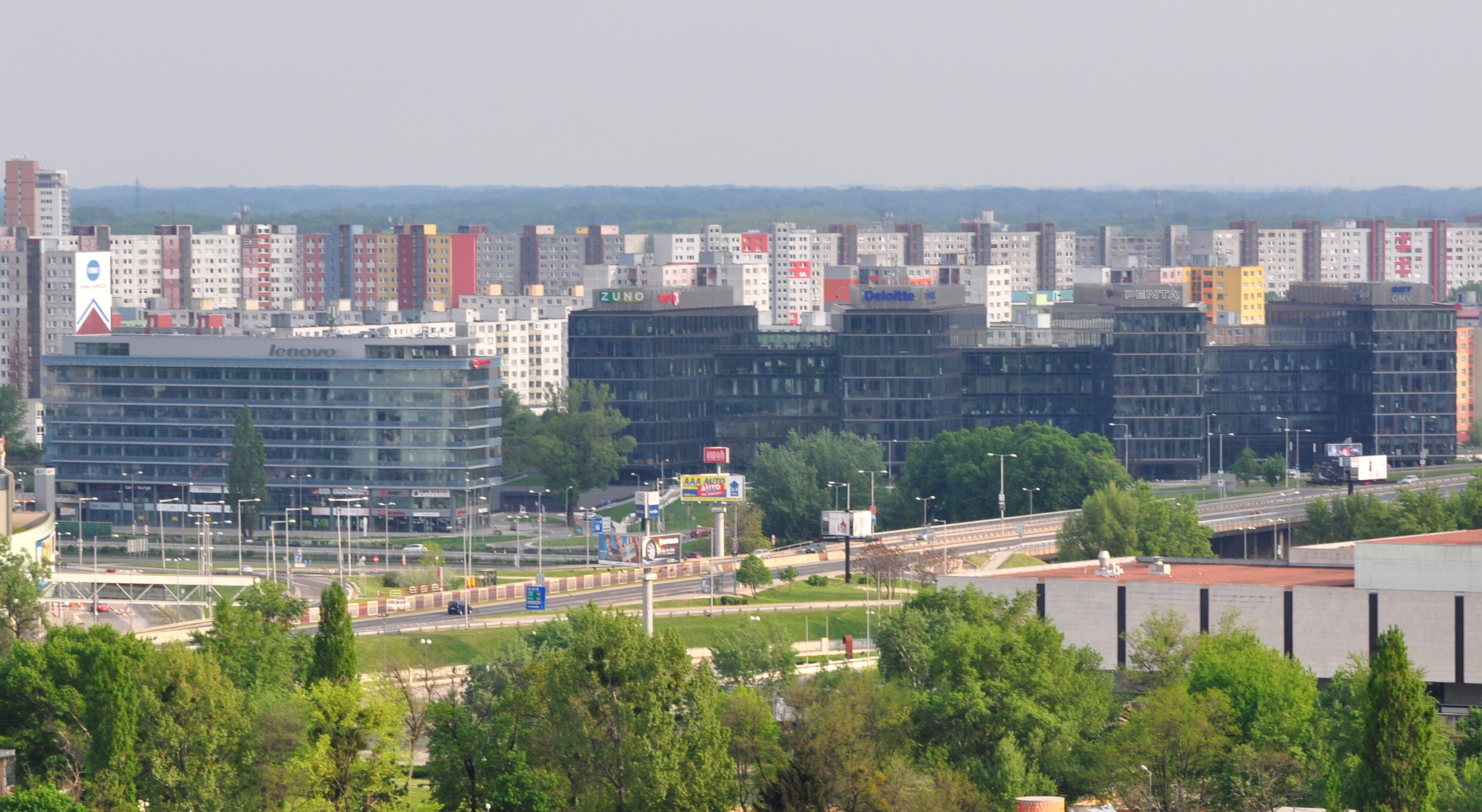
View of Digital Park Stage 1 & 2

Digital Park is a complex of seven modern office buildings located in the Bratislava district Petržalka on Einsteinova Street near the highway D1 (section Viedenská cesta - Prístavný most) and the shopping center Aupark on the opposite side. The main building is connected with Aupark by a footbridge over the highway; it connects the two buildings on their second floors.

== Project ==
There was also a high-rise building in the original project but it was changed after the financial group Penta had entered the project. This and other changes made the area less filled and the available space will be used for an artificial lake and a park.

The construction of the park proceeded in stages. During the years 2005 and 2006, the main 9-floor building was built, the remaining buildings were constructed in the following years.

Gross investment is about 3 billion Slovak crowns (cca €90 million).

== Stage 1 ==
The first building of the complex was passed (as capable) in October 2006. The building has 9 floors and one underground floor. The first floor is intended for shops, restaurants, and other services, while the remaining ones serve as offices. A parking lot and storerooms are located underground. The total area available for rent is 12,400 m^{2}. About one half of this is already rented to a foreign company that has a technical support center for the EMEA region here.

== Stage 2 ==
Digital Park II was built between 2007 and 2009. It consists of four mutually interconnected buildings. It is the largest of all the park's stages with a total rentable area of more than 40,000 m^{2}, most of which is intended for offices. The premises are also used as conference rooms. There are hundreds of parking places underground.

== Stage 3 ==
The third and final stage of Digital Park was completed in 2012. It is actually an extension to the already built Digital Park II. It offers more than 21,000 m^{2} of rentable area and over 360 parking places underground. As in Stage 2, its premises can also be used as conference rooms.

In total, the entire Digital Park offers about 74,000 m² of rentable area. It serves as the headquarters to many well-known companies, such as Lenovo, Shell, Bayer, or Penta Investments.
