= Marián Kočner =

Slovak businessman and convicted criminal

Marian Kočner
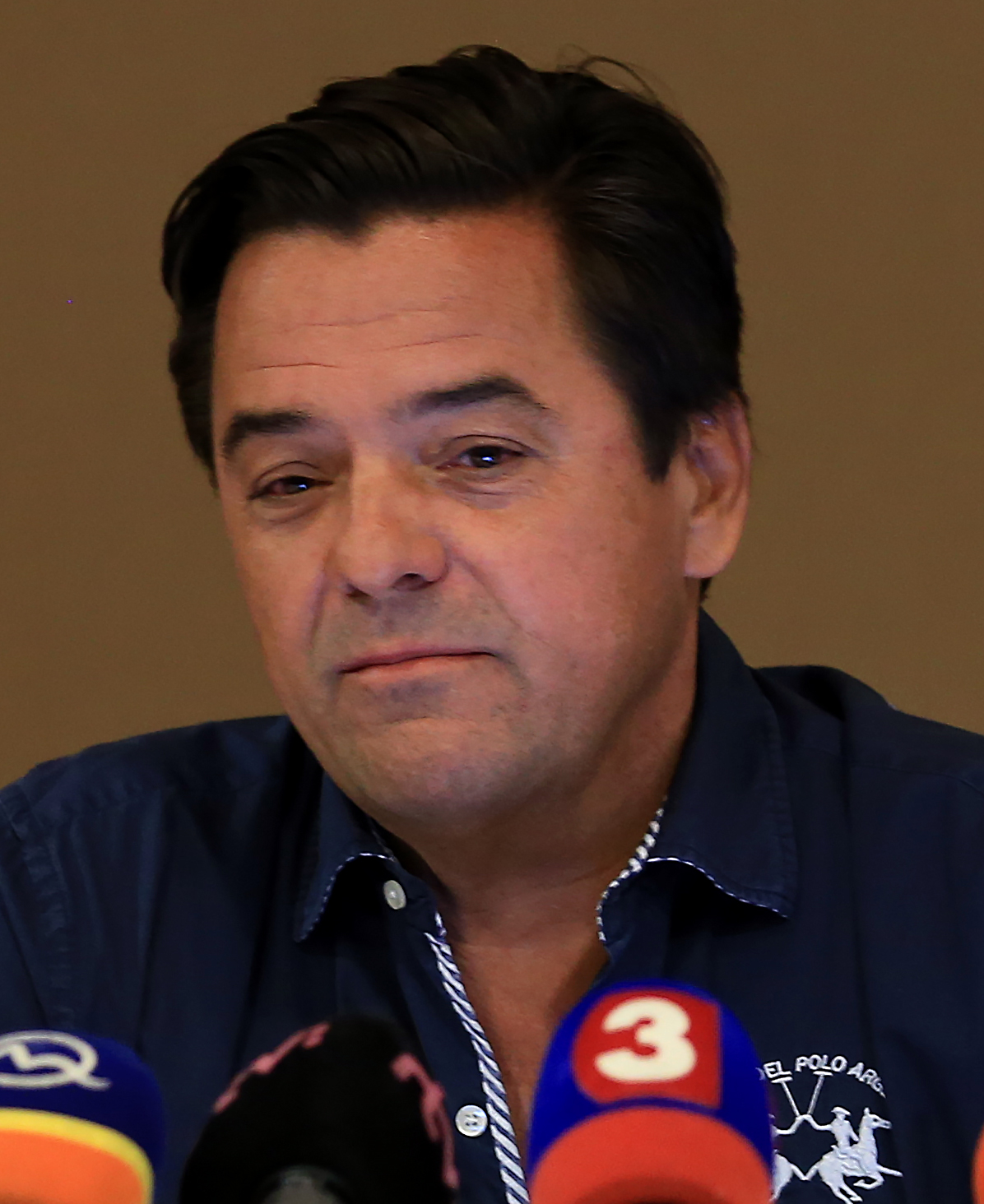
- Marian Kočner in April 2016
- Born: 17 May 1963 (age 62)
- Occupations: Businessman, convicted criminal

Marian Kočner (born 17 May 1963) is a Slovak businessman and convicted criminal. With business dealings mostly in the spheres of risk investment, financial development and property, his name appeared in leaked police documents known as the "mafia lists" in 2005, of a list of people suspected of involvement in organized crime and their vehicles, for use of police patrols. Since 10 December 2019 he has been included in the global Magnitsky sanctions list.

On 27 February 2020, Kočner was sentenced to 19 years in prison for forging $75 million worth of promissory notes to siphon money from Markíza. He was acquitted by a first-degree court in a separate high-profile case related to the murder of investigative journalist Jan Kuciak and his fiancée Martina Kusnirova, a crime which triggered a significant political crisis in Slovakia.

== Gamatex and TV Markíza ==
Kočner first became known to the public through his attempt to take over TV Markíza in 1998.

TV Markíza, one of the first private television channels in Slovakia, was founded by Pavol Rusko and Sylvia Volzová in partnership with CME Media Enterprises B.V. in 1996. Initially the channel was not granted a broadcasting license, as the licensing board objected that Rusko did not disclose Volzová as a co-owner. Rusko entered into an agreement with Espé štúdio, a company owned by Siloš Pohanka, to pay 3 million DEM in exchange for help getting a broadcasting license for Markíza. When the membership of the licensing board later changed, Markíza secured a broadcasting license, and launched on 31 August 1996. However Rusko declared the agreement with Espé štúdio invalid, arguing that Markíza had acquired the license without Pohanka's help. After unsuccessful attempts at getting money from Rusko, Pohanka sold his claim to Gamatex, a company owned by Kočner, who persuaded Volzová to acknowledge the claim and began court proceedings to have the claim paid out.

In August 1998 Kočner appeared at the Markíza offices with a court order giving him control over the TV station. When negotiations with Rusko regarding the ownership dispute failed, Kočner occupied the TV station with hired private security and fired the TV channel's top managers. The move sparked public protests, coming only 10 days before parliamentary elections; at that time TV Markíza was the main news outlet opposing the government of Vladimír Mečiar, and the attempted takeover was seen as an attack on press freedom. Several thousand protesters gathered in front of Markíza's offices to oppose the takeover, and several opposition politicians spoke at the rally. After two days, Kočner and his associates left the building, and the ownership dispute continued in court. According to news reports, Kočner's involvement in TV Markíza seemed to end in 2000 when Rusko bought Gamatex through intermediaries.

In a 2006 interview with aktualne.sk (not to be confused with aktuality.sk) Kočner said the security firm involved in the takeover of Markíza belonged to Peter Čongrády, a local mafia boss. However, in later interviews he denied hiring Čongrády.

In June 2016 Kočner's company "Správa a inkaso zmeniek" initiated court proceedings against Rusko and Markíza to collect money owed to him under four promissory notes amounting to around €69 million. Kočner claimed that Rusko had issued the promissory notes in June 2000 with Markíza providing endorsement for the notes. At the time Rusko was the executive director of TV Markíza as well as one of its shareholders. Two of those notes amounted to €8.3 million each with a maturity date in 2015 and another two were signed as "blank cheques" in the amount of €26 million with a maturity date in 2016 added later. Rusko acknowledged Kočner's claim in court and declared that the promissory notes were intended to resolve the ownership dispute with Gamatex. Markíza's management was unaware of the existence of the promissory notes. They were not recorded in either company's accounting and were not discovered during the preparation of the due diligence report when CME became the sole shareholder in TV Markíza. In April 2018 a court declared Kočner's claim as valid. However, in retaliation TV Markíza filed a criminal complaint against Kočner and Rusko for forging the promissory notes. In addition, an investigation into possible tax evasion began as, by not disclosing possession of the promissory notes to tax authorities, Kočner's companies avoided paying tax on interest on the notes.

In June 2018, Kočner was detained by the Slovak authorities in the case of the promissory notes forgery together with Pavol Rusko, as well as for various tax-related crimes. On 27 February 2020, Kocner was sentenced to 19 years of jail for forging $75 million worth of promissory notes to siphon money from Markiza.

== Murder of Ján Kuciak ==
Kočner's business practices were a prominent topic of articles by Ján Kuciak, an investigative journalist from Aktuality.sk, who was murdered in February 2018 along with his fiancée, Martina Kušnírová. A couple of months prior to Kuciak's death, Kočner allegedly threatened in a phone call to "dig up dirt" on Kuciak, saying "I will focus especially on you, your mother, your father, on your siblings". Kuciak filed a criminal complaint but a subsequent police investigation concluded that Kočner's alleged statements did not constitute a criminal offence. After Kuciak's murder, general prosecutor Jaromír Čižnár ordered the case to be reopened. However police again closed the case concluding that Kočner's statements did not constitute a criminal offence. Aktuality.sk subsequently published a transcript of the phone call between Kuciak and Kočner.

On 4 October 2018, Kočner was named by entrepreneur Zoltán Andruskó as the person who ordered Kuciak's death. Andruskó had been taken into custody on 30 September for his part in the murder, and was co-operating with police. On 8 March 2019 Kočner was charged with having ordered Kuciak's murder.

The trial of Marián Kočner and three other defendants, including Alena Zsuzsová, the mother of his goddaughter, began on 13 January 2020. The 2016 murder of Peter Molnár, a businessman from Kolárovo, was included in the case. On the first day of the trial, co-defendant Miroslav Marček confessed to killing Kuciak and Kušnírová, and also admitted to killing Molnár during a violent burglary in 2016. On the second day of the trial, Andruskó testified against all four defendants. On 6 April 2020, Marček was sentenced to 23 years in prison. The prosecutor appealed against the sentence.
