= Murder of Ján Kuciak =

2018 murder in Slovakia

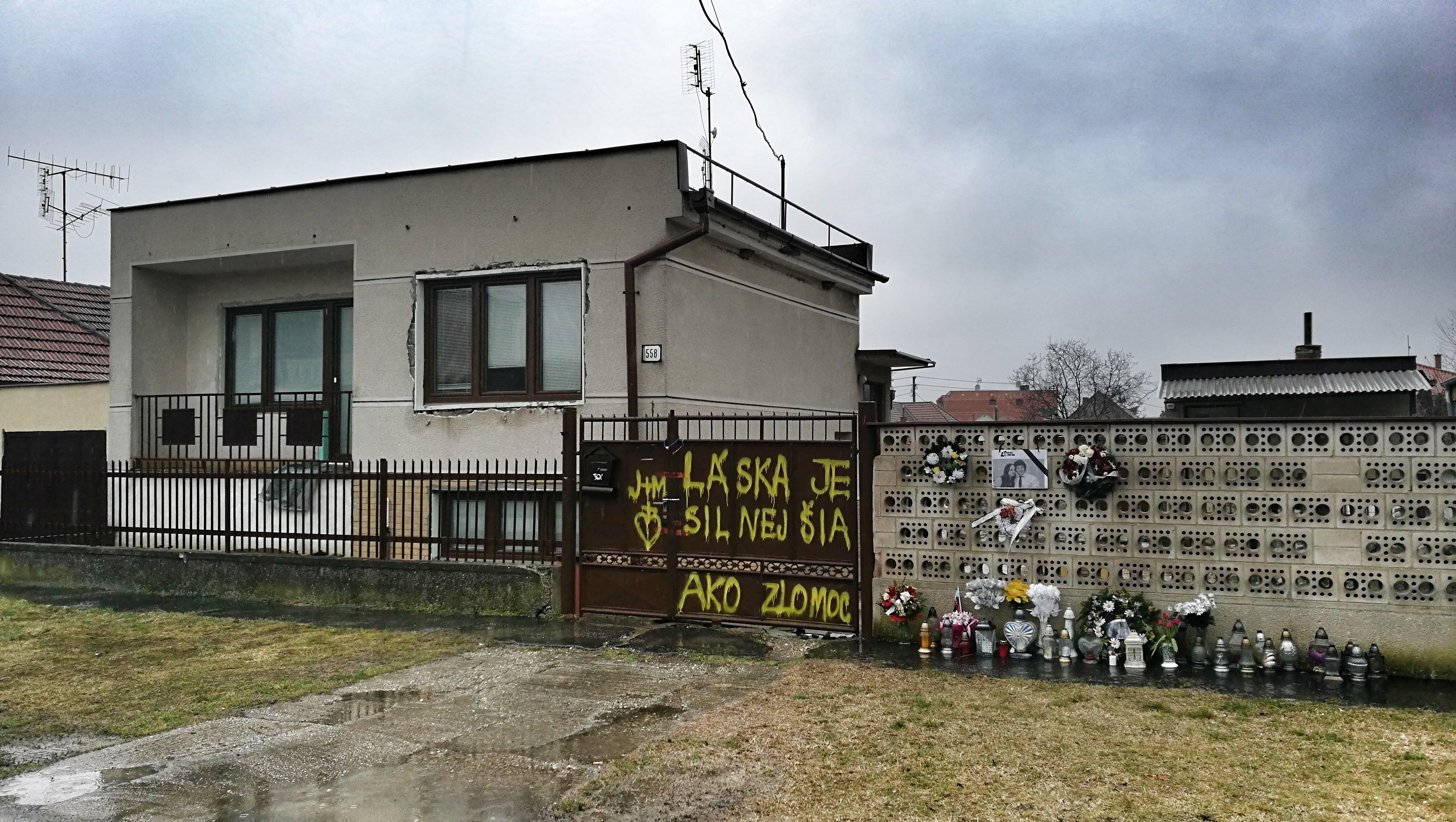
- House of Ján Kuciak and Martina Kušnírová in Veľká Mača
- Date: 21 February 2018
- Outcome: Resignation of Prime Minister Robert Fico and his cabinet
- Deaths: Ján Kuciak (aged 27); Martina Kušnírová (aged 27)
- Burial: Gregorovce (Kušnírová); Štiavnik (Kuciak)
- Convictions: Zoltán Andruskó: 15 years; Miroslav Marček: 25 years; Tomáš Szabó: 25 years; Alena Zsuzsová: 25 years

Ján Kuciak (17 May 1990 – 21 February 2018) was a Slovak investigative journalist. Kuciak worked as a reporter for the news website Aktuality.sk and focused mainly on investigating tax fraud of several businessmen with connections to top-level Slovak politicians. He and his fiancée, Martina Kušnírová, were assassinated on 21 February 2018 in their home in Veľká Mača, Galanta District, Slovakia.

Kuciak was the first journalist murdered in Slovakia since the country's independence. The murders caused shock and disbelief throughout the country, sparking mass popular protests and a political crisis, with the government of Prime Minister Robert Fico on one side, and President Andrej Kiska and opposition parties on the other. The crisis culminated on 15 March with the resignation of Prime Minister Fico and his entire cabinet, followed by the forming of a new cabinet led by Peter Pellegrini.

According to the prosecution's indictment, businessman Marian Kočner tasked Alena Zsuzsová with arranging Kuciak's murder, and she in turn tasked Zoltán Andruskó, who ordered Tomáš Szabó and Miroslav Marček to carry out the murder. Andruskó, a businessman from Chotín, admitted to ordering the murder, and was sentenced to 15 years in prison. Marček, a former soldier, admitted to shooting Kuciak and Kušnírová and was sentenced to 25 years in prison. His cousin Tomáš Szabó, a former policeman, was sentenced to 25 years in prison for participating in the murder.

The case is ongoing. On 20 May 2025, the Supreme Court of the Slovak Republic decided that the case will be tried again by a new panel of judges at the Specialised Criminal Court.

== Background ==
Murdered journalist Ján Kuciak

Ján Kuciak was born on 17 May 1990 in the village of Štiavnik in Bytča District. He studied and graduated with a master's degree in journalism at the University of Constantine the Philosopher in Nitra, where he continued his studies as a postgraduate student in the field of mass media communication. While working on his PhD, he also held a teaching position at the same faculty.

He later started to work for the newspaper Hospodárske noviny, before taking up a position in the editorial office of Aktuality.sk, primarily as an investigative journalist. He particularly focused on cases of tax evasion, including ones related to the then-ruling party Direction - Social Democracy headed by PM Robert Fico. He had previously written about companies with unclear ownership as well as suspected systemic embezzlement from European Union funds.

The most prominent subject of his articles was businessman Marian Kočner, who first became known in Slovakia in 1998 due to his unsuccessful attempt to take over the private television news network TV Markíza with the help of the Slovak Intelligence Service (SIS). In his June 2017 articles, Kuciak described several discrepancies in the halted investigation of a case involving Kočner and the suspicious transfers of his hotels in Donovaly, which resulted in a €8 million VAT refund in 2010–2012. On 5 September 2017, Kočner phoned Kuciak and confronted him over his work, using profanities and saying that he would start gathering damaging information about Kuciak and his family. Two days later Kuciak filed a complaint against Kočner, but was not spoken to about the issue by police until over a month later. Kočner was accused of tax and insurance premiums evasion in the Donovaly case in late September 2017.

In a December 2017 article, Kuciak described suspicious activity in a legal case in which Kočner's firm IIDH was suing pharmaceutical distribution company Unipharma and its subsidiary for €45 million. In response, the Ministry of Justice launched an investigation into the actions of the judge involved in the case. In the last article published before his death, Kuciak wrote about suspicious transactions involving Kočner in the Bratislava apartment building Five Star Residence. According to the article, 19 apartments were sold to and from five different firms fully or partially controlled by Kočner at least twice, raising questions about possible tax-related criminal activity.

== Assassination ==
At the time of his death, Kuciak was 27 years old. He lived in the village of Veľká Mača, about 65 km (40 miles) east of the capital Bratislava. On the morning of 26 February 2018, police were called to his home by family members after the couple had not answered phone calls for more than four days. Kuciak's fiancée, Martina Kušnírová, usually spoke with her mother on a daily basis. Her mother stated that she last spoke with her daughter in the afternoon of 21 February. When she tried to contact her again that evening, there was no reply. The family stated that Kušnírová's cellphone appeared to switch off three days later, probably due to a dead battery.

Police entering the house found Kuciak and Kušnírová shot dead. Kuciak had been shot twice in the chest, while Kušnírová had been shot once in the head from the front. Both were shot at close range with a 9 mm caliber handgun. There was no evidence of a struggle and nothing appeared to have been stolen. Police found two empty cartridges at the crime scene as well as several unused bullets. The murders were initially believed to have been committed some time between 22 and 25 February, but were subsequently suspected to have taken place in the evening of 21 February.

== Reactions ==
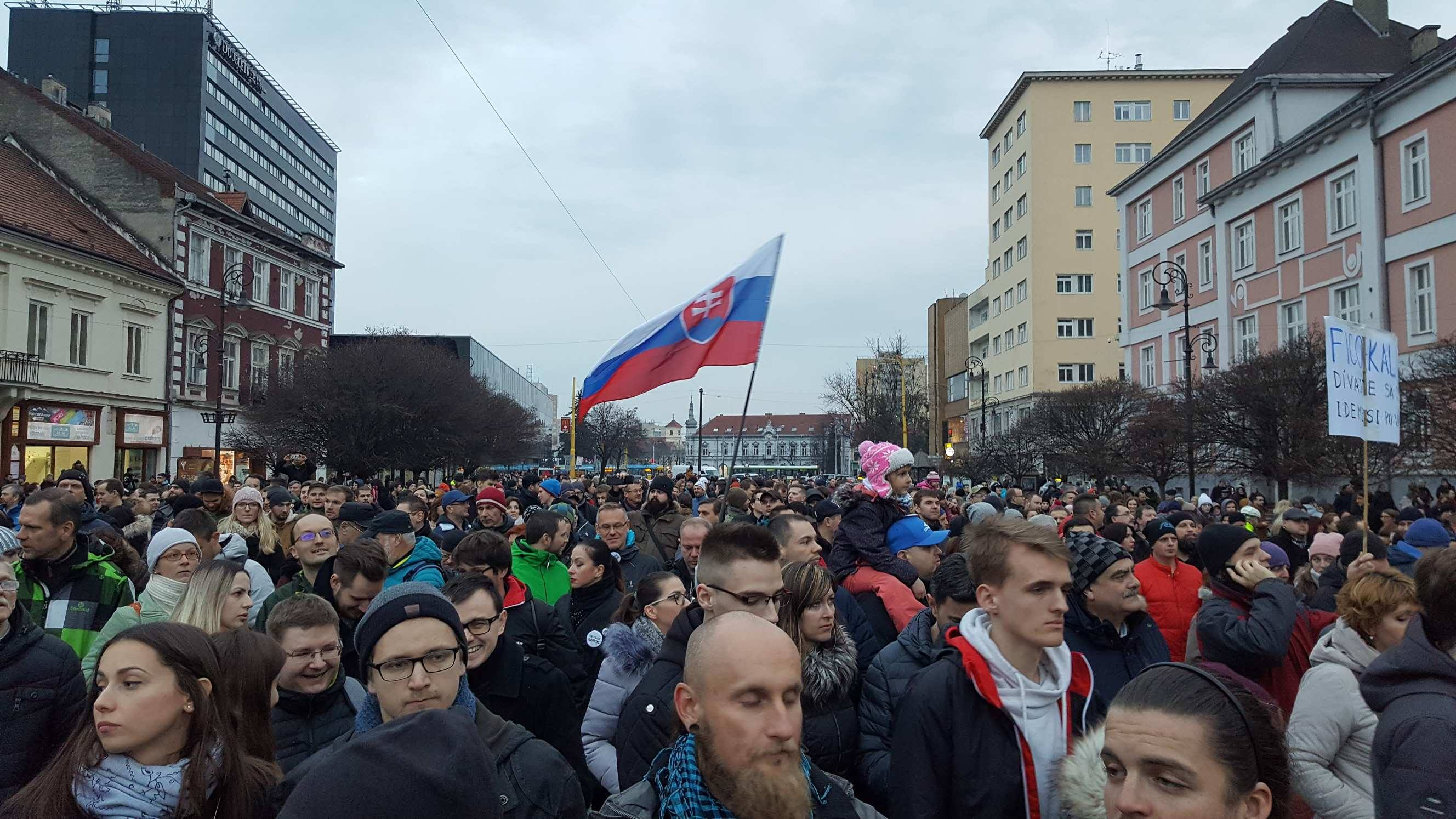
Protest in Košice, 9 March 2018

The murders sent shockwaves throughout Slovakia. The day after the news broke, gatherings were held around the country in tribute. Candles were lit at the Slovak National Uprising Square in Bratislava and in front of the editorial office of Aktuality.sk, where Kuciak worked. Similar gatherings were also organised in the Czech cities of Prague and Brno. President Andrej Kiska stated that he was "shocked and horrified that something like this happened in Slovakia". Antonio Tajani, President of the European Parliament, called on Slovakia to launch a thorough investigation, offering international support if needed, adding that "the European Parliament will not rest until justice is done". Ringier Axel Springer, the parent company of Aktuality.sk, called the murders a "cruel assassination", vowing to redouble their journalistic efforts.

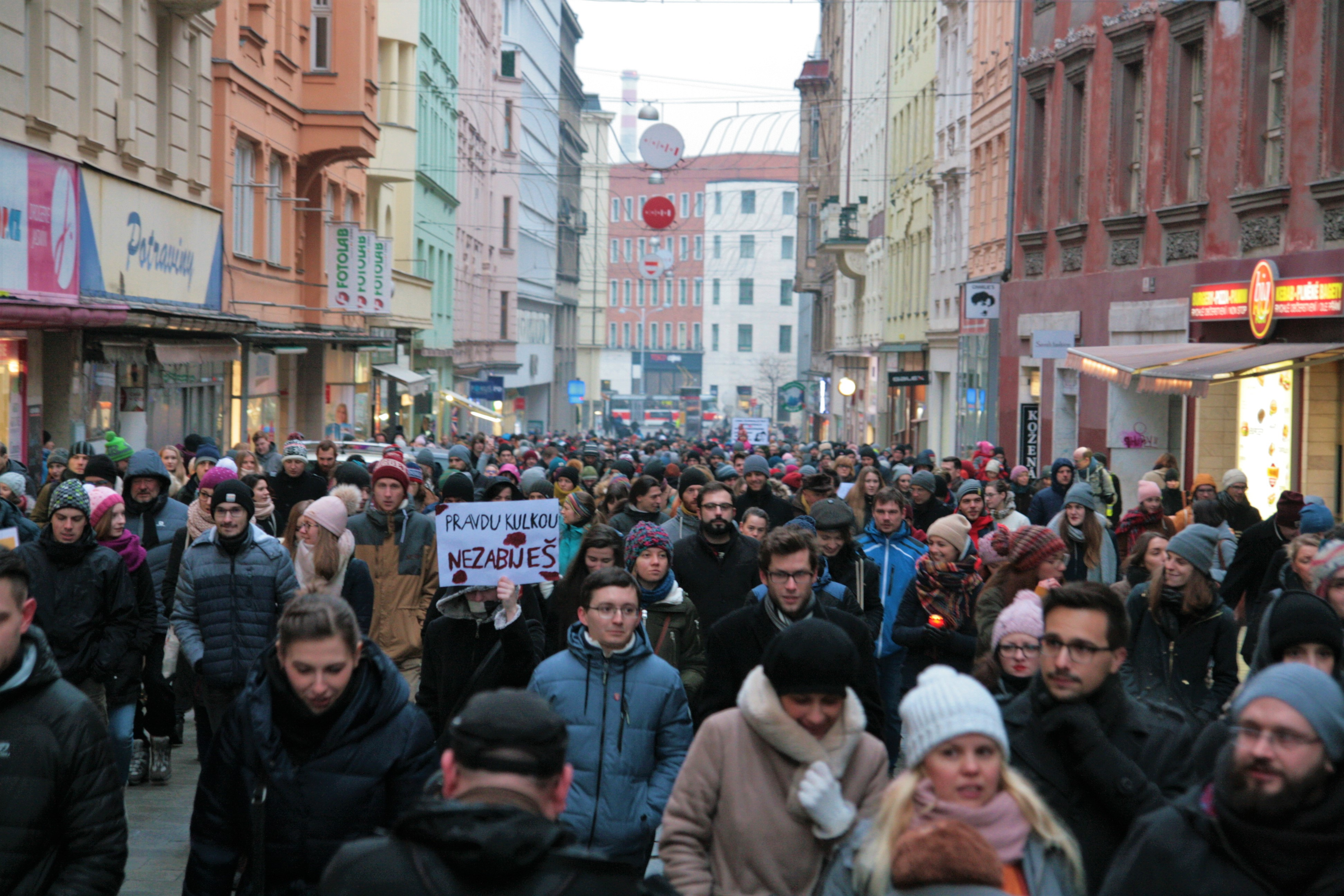
A march for Ján and Martina in Brno

=== Protests ===
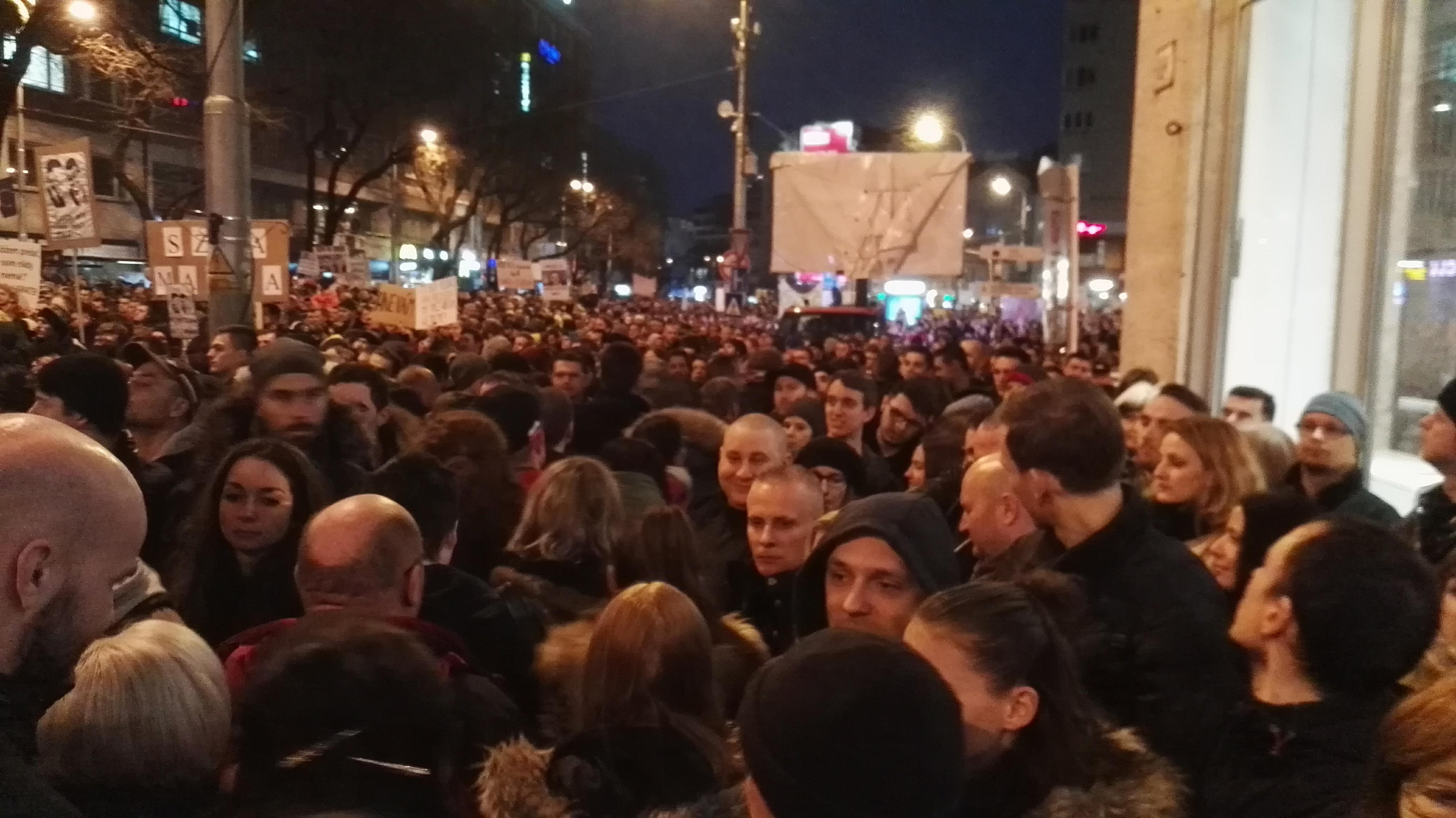
For Decent Slovakia protest in Bratislava, 16 March 2018

On Friday 2 March, up to 25,000 people gathered in Bratislava to commemorate the murdered couple. On 9 March, protests were held in 48 towns and cities in Slovakia as well as 17 other cities around the world. In Bratislava alone, about 60,000 people held a protest march, the biggest turnout of any demonstration since the Velvet Revolution in 1989. The protests were endorsed by several universities in Slovakia and the Czech Republic, teachers, school associations, artists and non-governmental organizations. 21 universities cancelled afternoon lectures to allow students and employees to attend the protests.

Two days after Prime Minister Fico's resignation, an even larger demonstration was held in Bratislava with over 65,000 people participating under slogans such as "Enough of Smer" and "Early elections". Former Speaker of Parliament and ex-presidential candidate František Mikloško made an impassioned speech during the protest saying that "the revolution started by the parents has to be finished by their children". He argued that only twice in the history of post-war Czechoslovakia have popular protests managed to make the government resign: in November 1989 and now, adding that "when somebody tries to abuse their power in the future, they should remember March 2018 and the mass protests". Mikloško's speech was accompanied by the ringing of keys, reminiscent of the Velvet Revolution in 1989.

== Investigation ==
In a press conference the same morning, Slovak Police President Tibor Gašpar stated that the murders "likely have something to do with [Kuciak’s] investigative activities". The Government of Slovakia offered €1 million for information leading to the murderers. Prime Minister Robert Fico made the announcement during a press conference with Interior Minister Robert Kaliňák and Police President Tibor Gašpar. During the press conference, they displayed packs of banknotes amounting to one million euros, which the government promised to give to anyone who came forward with relevant information that could help explain the murder. Furthermore, Prime Minister Fico announced the creation of an inter-agency task force involving employees of the General Prosecutor's Office, Special Prosecutor's Office, the Interior Ministry and the SIS in attempting to solve the case.

At the time of his murder, Kuciak was working on a report about Slovak connections with the Italian organized crime syndicate 'Ndrangheta. He had previously reported on organized tax fraud involving businesspeople close to the ruling Smer-SD party. On 28 February, Aktuality.sk published Kuciak's last, unfinished story. The article details the activities of Italian businessmen with ties to organised crime who have settled in eastern Slovakia, and have spent years embezzling European Union funds intended for the development of this relatively poor region, as well as their connections to high-ranking state officials, such as Viliam Jasaň, a deputy and the Secretary of the State Security Council of Slovakia, or Mária Trošková, a former nude model who became Chief Adviser of Prime Minister Robert Fico. Both Jasaň and Trošková took leave of absence on the same day, stating that they would return to their positions once the investigations were concluded.

=== Initial arrests ===
On 1 March, four days after the discovery of the murders, heavily armed units from the Slovak Police Corps' elite National Crime Agency (NAKA) raided several locations in eastern Slovakia, in the cities of Michalovce and Trebišov. Antonino Vadalà, an Italian businessman mentioned in Kuciak's report, was detained along with his two brothers Sebastiano and Bruno, as well as his cousin Pietro Caprotta and several other men of Italian origin. All the detained men were released from custody after 48 hours, due to lack of sufficient evidence. On the day of the arrests, General Prosecutor Jaromír Čižnár ordered the police to give no further updates to the press or the public regarding the investigation. Vadalà was rearrested on 13 March, this time due to an international warrant issued by the Italian police. According to the arrest warrant, Vadalà is suspected of drug trafficking as well as money laundering. Among other offences, he was said to have been planning to import large quantities of cocaine from South America. On 23 April, Slovakia approved Italy's request for extradition.

As a result of their investigation into the murder, the Slovak police stated that Kuciak had been murdered because of his work as an investigative journalist, and that the murder was a contract killing.

=== Arrests made in September ===
On 17 September 2018 the prosecutor published a facial composite (identikit) of a person who allegedly could have been involved in the assassination, or may have information about people closely connected to the crime. The prosecutor added that the murder had been carried out by professionals as a contract killing. A man from Veľká Mača named Marek claiming to know the person from the image was subsequently questioned by police. He said it was his former colleague Miroslav Č., then living in Ostrava, who told the media that he did not understand why he was on the identikit.

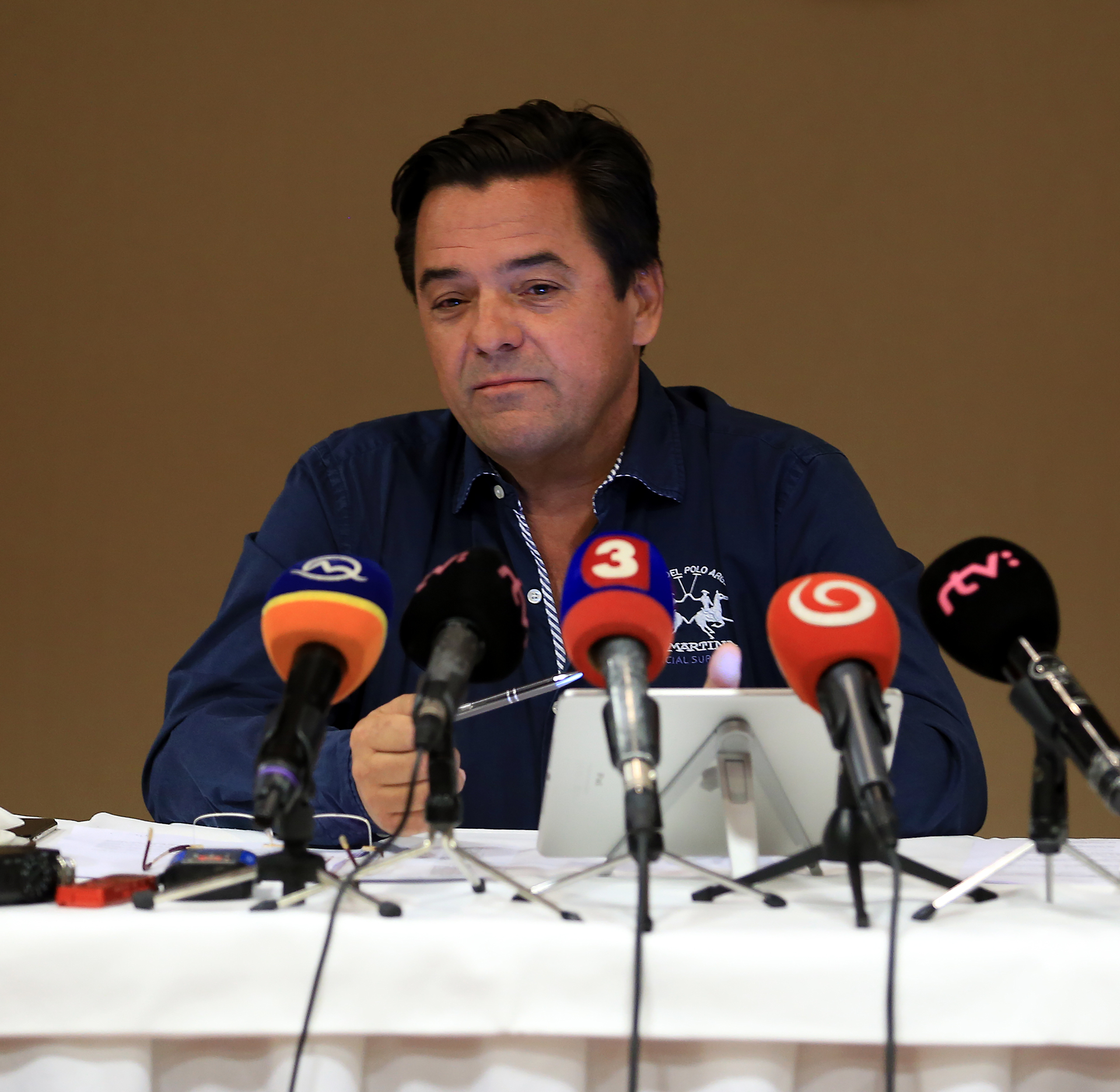
Marian Kočner

On 27 September 2018, heavily armed NAKA forces arrested eight suspects in Kolárovo. Three of them, Tomáš Szabó, Miroslav Marček, and Zoltán Andruskó, were charged with the murder and other crimes, and the others were released. Minister Denisa Saková announced that around 200 individuals had been questioned in relation to the murder. The attorney of Ján Kuciak's family, Daniel Lipšic, commented that "the scale of the investigation, even with help of Europol and other foreign investigative organisations, was unprecedented".

On Friday 28 September 2018, Alena Zsuzsová was also arrested in relation to the murder, and became the fourth person to be charged with the murder. It became clear that releasing the identikit was a tactical move by the police. The man pictured was related to one of the accused and after the identikit was released the suspects started to communicate more intensively.

On 30 September 2018 the prosecution's motion to take all four accused into custody was approved by the Special Criminal Court in Banská Bystrica.

=== Subsequent investigation ===
On 4 October 2018, Lívia Kňažíková, the attorney of Zoltán Andruskó, confirmed that he was cooperating with police, and had named Marian Kočner as the individual ordering the killing.

On 14 March 2019, Kočner was charged with ordering the murder. At the time, Kočner was already in custody in relation to the case of forging of promissory notes involving TV Markíza.

On 11 April 2019, Miroslav Marček told police that he was the one who shot Kuciak and Kušnírová, which disproved an earlier theory that Szabó was the shooter and Marček the driver.

== Political crisis ==
2018 Slovak political crisis
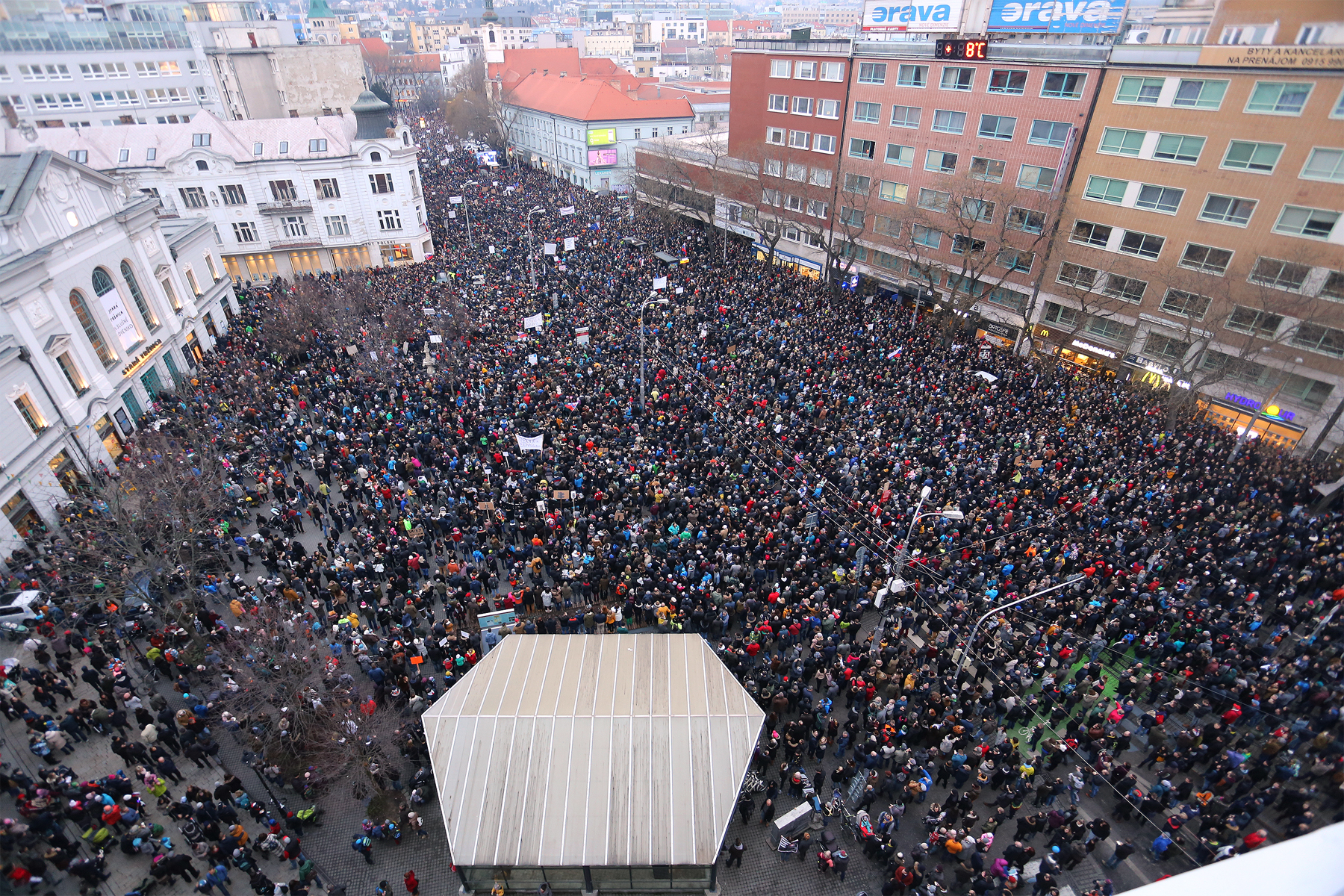
- Protest in Bratislava, 9 March 2018
- Date: 26 February – 17 April 2018
- Location: Slovakia
- Caused by: Murder of Ján Kuciak; Government corruption; Democratic backsliding
- Goals: Resignation of Prime Minister Robert Fico and his cabinet; Anti-corruption measures; Early elections
- Result: Resignation of Prime Minister Fico and his government on 14 March; Appointment of a new government under Peter Pellegrini on 22 March; Resignation of Interior Minister Robert Kaliňák; Dismissal of Police Chief Tibor Gašpar

Parties
(Slovakia) Opposition: President; SaS; OĽaNO; SR; ĽSNS; Anti-government protestors	(Slovakia) Government: Prime Minister; Smer-SD; SNS; Most–Híd; Police Corps

Lead figures
Andrej Kiska Richard Sulík Igor Matovič Boris Kollár Marian Kotleba	Robert Fico Robert Kaliňák Tibor Gašpar Andrej Danko Béla Bugár

The same day the murder was announced, Prime Minister Fico called on the political opposition not to "exploit" the situation. Meanwhile, a number of opposition politicians accused the ruling Smer-SD party of indirect involvement. Member of Parliament Veronika Remišová, from the opposition OĽaNO party, compared the killings to the infamous murder of Róbert Remiáš, a police officer who was assassinated in 1996, in an act widely believed to have been a contract killing by the Slovak mafia on the orders of Prime Minister Vladimír Mečiar. On 27 February, Freedom and Solidarity and OĽaNO demanded the resignation of Interior Minister Robert Kaliňák and Police President Tibor Gašpar.

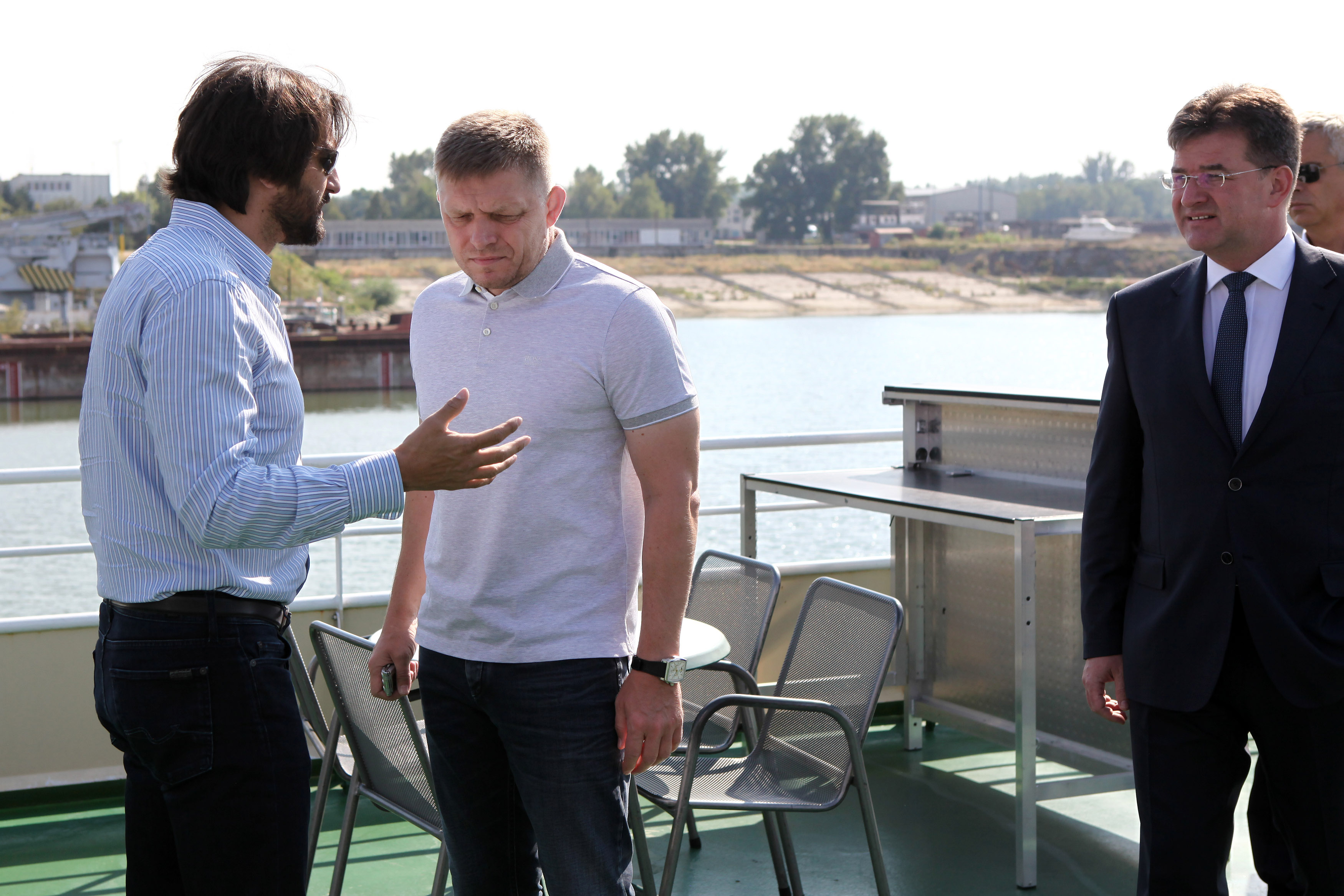
Interior Minister Robert Kaliňák speaking with Prime Minister Robert Fico

The crisis escalated on 4 March when President Kiska made a live broadcast on state television, warning the government against further polarising the country. He called for either a "radical cabinet reshuffle" or a snap election. Kiska's speech infuriated Fico, who accused him of "joining the opposition". Furthermore, he accused the president of conspiring with Hungarian-American billionaire George Soros in the planning of a coup d'etat, based on the fact that President Kiska met with Soros at Soros' apartment in New York City in September 2017, ostensibly to discuss issues related to the Roma minority.

On 28 February, two days after the news of Kuciak's murder broke, Minister of Culture Marek Maďarič announced his resignation. Announcing his decision to the press, Maďarič stated that "as a culture minister, I can't cope with the fact that a journalist was killed during my tenure." Robert Kaliňák, Minister of the Interior and Deputy Prime Minister, resigned on 12 March 2018 after weeks of mounting pressure. The Most-Híd party, the junior coalition partner in the government, had demanded the resignation of Kaliňák in exchange for continued support of Smer-SD. The next day, Most-Híd joined the calls for snap elections, announcing that it would leave the government if it failed to reach a deal with its two coalition partners, Smer-SD and the Slovak National Party (SNS). Most-Híd Chairman, Béla Bugár, announced the decision after an eight-hour session of the Most-Hid Republican Council, the party's decision-making body.

=== Fico resigns ===
On 14 March, following a meeting with President Kiska, Prime Minister Fico announced that he would resign to avoid early elections and "solve the political crisis". During the meeting, Fico laid out a number of specific conditions to be met by the President in order for him to resign, including that the result of the 2016 Slovak parliamentary election be respected, that the current ruling government coalition must continue, and that Smer-SD, as the largest party in parliament, would name the next prime minister. Fico stated that he already had a candidate in mind, widely reported in Slovak media as Deputy Prime Minister Peter Pellegrini. On 15 March, President Kiska formally accepted the resignation of Fico and his cabinet, and tasked Pellegrini with the forming of a new government.

=== Continued protests ===
On 22 March 2018, President Andrej Kiska appointed a new cabinet led by Prime Minister Peter Pellegrini. Tomáš Drucker, former Minister of Health, was appointed Minister of Interior. Protest organisers announced on the same day via Facebook that they were cancelling the upcoming "For a Decent Slovakia" protest, and that they were forming a civic platform while closely watching the new government's next steps.

Three days later they announced that if Drucker did not remove Police President Tibor Gašpar from office, protests would start again. On 28 March, they announced further protests. Around 30,000 people protested in Bratislava on 5 April. Drucker resigned on 16 April, saying that after a three-week assessment he did not agree with dismissing Gašpar, and would not remain as minister if it polarized society. The next day, Pellegrini and Gašpar announced that they agreed that Gašpar would step down at the end of May in order to calm the tensions.

On 26 April President Kiska appointed Denisa Saková Minister of Interior. After Gašpar's departure, Milan Lučanský became acting Police President, before being confirmed on 15 April 2019.

== Criminal proceedings ==
=== First trial ===
On 30 December 2019, one of the accused, Zoltán Andruskó, was sentenced to 15 years in prison after striking a deal with prosecutors. Andruskó pleaded guilty to all charges against him, and agreed to be a witness for the prosecution in the trials of the other defendants. Due to his cooperation with the murder investigation, the prosecutor proposed a reduction in his sentence from the usual sentence given for these crimes (25 years or life sentence) to 10 years in prison, though this proposal was rejected by the court. The court requested a sentence of 15 years in prison, which Andruskó accepted. His prison sentence began the same day.

The trial of Marian Kočner, Alena Zsuzsová, Tomáš Szabó and Miroslav Marček began on 13 January 2020 at the Special Criminal Court in Pezinok. The 2016 murder of Peter Molnár, a businessman from Kolárovo, was included in the case.

- On the first day of the trial, Marček confessed to killing Kuciak and Kušnírová, and also admitted to killing Molnár during a violent burglary in 2016. He described how he and his cousin Szabó accepted the order for Kuciak's murder from Andruskó and how the three of them prepared for it. He testified that Szabó drove them to Veľká Mača on the evening of 21 February 2018, and described how he himself executed both Kuciak and Kušnírová. Szabó picked Marček up after the murders, and the two of them then destroyed the gun. Marček also described how he killed Peter Molnár with Szabó's assistance in the 2016 burglary. Kočner admitted to unauthorised carrying of weapons.
- On the second day of the trial, Andruskó testified against all four defendants, now as a sentenced witness rather than accused. He described how Zsuzsová gave him the order for the murder, and how he then tasked Szabó and Marček with it, how they planned it and how the payment was received from Zsuzsová and then distributed among the three men after the murders were carried out. Kuciak's father and brother and Kušnírová's mother testified about Ján and Martina, their work, their relationships with them, and their loss following the murders. The testimony of Kuciak's mother on the same topics was read in her presence.
- One of the key witnesses was Peter Tóth, a former high ranking officer of the Slovak Information Service (SIS) and a friend of Kočner, who testified about how he, at Kočner's request, organized a surveillance team which followed, took photographs, and recorded footage of various journalists, including Kuciak. This was carried out to gather material which Kočner could purportedly then use to compromise his opponents in an online program entitled Pranier (English: Pillory). He testified about Kočner's negative attitude towards journalists and his animosity towards Kuciak, evidenced by his use of various expletives when referring to Kuciak.
- Norbert Bödör and Jaroslav Haščák, prominent Slovak businessmen and acquaintances of Kočner, testified and denied having known about or being involved with the murder.
- Colleagues of Kuciak from Aktuality.sk testified about his character, journalistic work, and how they reacted to the phone call Kuciak had with Kočner on 5 September 2017. Before the phone call, Kuciak received a vulgar email from Kočner in response to questions Kuciak had sent him about his business activities.
- Members of the surveillance team testified as witnesses. They confirmed that they followed Kuciak and obtained footage of him at Tóth's request.
- Various experts testified about the manner of Kuciak's death.
- The court dealt with various experts' examination of the mental health of the accused persons.
- The 5 September 2017 phone call in which Kočner told Kuciak he would start gathering damaging information about him and his family was presented, as well as the recording of Kočner's press conference at which he and Kuciak had a verbal confrontation when Kuciak asked detailed questions about Kočner's activities.
- An audio recording of a private conversation between Kočner and the former General Prosecutor Dobroslav Trnka was presented as part of the evidence. In the conversation, Kočner harshly berates Trnka for his attempt to blackmail Jaroslav Haščák with audio recordings related to the Gorilla scandal which could compromise Haščák, and which Trnka was secretly in possession of at the time despite his duty to forward any such materials to the relevant authorities.
- Parts of communication between Kočner and Zsuzsová via Threema, an encrypted messaging app, were read during the proceedings. Various passages were alleged to have hidden meanings related to the murder.
- Analysis was carried out by an expert of various locations of cell phones which were used by the involved at various times around the time of the murder. This included an analysis of the movements of Kočner's and Zsuzsová's phones after the murder, used to prove a meeting between the two. Both accused denied having met at that time and location.
- Both Kočner and Zsuzsová testified, denying their guilt.
- Towards the end of the proceedings, Zoltán Andruskó testified again. Both sides presented closing arguments.

On 6 April 2020, Marček was sentenced to 23 years in prison after his case was allocated a separate trial. The prosecutor appealed against the sentence, after which the Supreme Court increased Marček's sentence to 25 years.

The trial of Kočner, Zsuzsová and Szabó lasted 22 days. In a verdict delivered on 3 September 2020, Tomáš Szabó was found guilty of involvement in the murder of Kuciak and Kušnírová, the murder of Peter Molnár, and of unauthorised carrying of weapons, and was sentenced to 25 years in prison. Marian Kočner was found guilty of unauthorised carrying of weapons and given a fine of €5,000. Kočner and Alena Zsuzsová were acquitted of charges related to the murders of Kuciak and Kušnírová. The court stated that their involvement in the murders was not proved beyond reasonable doubt. The court explained its verdict by stating that not a single piece of direct evidence was put forward against Kočner, with the indictment being built on a series of circumstantial evidence; the only direct evidence against Zsuzsová was the testimony of Zoltán Andruskó. The prosecutor immediately appealed against the court's ruling to acquit Kočner and Zsuzsová.

Following the verdict, Kočner remained in prison, having been sentenced by a first-degree court to 19 years in a case of forging of promissory notes involving Markíza - Slovakia. Zsuzsová was released and immediately re-arrested, as she is charged with involvement in the attempted murders of prosecutor Maroš Žilinka, Daniel Lipšic, and prosecutor Peter Šufliarsky. The Special Criminal Court in Banská Bystrica ordered custody for Zsuzsová on 5 September 2020, and extended it on 16 March 2021.

Various public officials (domestic and international), media representatives, and organizations reacted negatively to this ruling. President Zuzana Čaputová wrote on Facebook that she was shocked by the verdict and needed to understand its explanation, adding that she respected it but expected that the case would not end and would continue to the Supreme Court. Prime Minister Igor Matovič stated on Facebook: "It seems that for now the apparent instigators of the murder would like to slip out of the clutches of justice… Let’s believe that justice will wait for them both."

==== Appeal to the Supreme Court ====
The supervising prosecutor submitted his appeal to the Supreme Court on 23 October 2020. In the appeal, he reasoned that the first-degree court refused to take into account crucial evidence, that the court's reasoning was wrong and based on unclear and incomplete findings, and that the court did not deal with all circumstances important for the verdict. He further argued that in coming to its decision the court used evidence which was not presented before the court during the trial. He contested the court's reasoning about the unreliability of witnesses Andruskó and Tóth, as well as the court's failure to correctly assess the conflicting statements made by Kočner and Zsuzsová, among other arguments against the verdict. He proposed that the Supreme Court return the case to the Special Criminal Court to be retried by a different three-judge panel, suggesting that additional witnesses be called and additional evidence be considered. Kuciak's parents and their attorney identified with all proposals made by the prosecutor. Kušnírová's mother and her attorney Roman Kvasnica also appealed against the verdict, again asking the Supreme Court to order the case to be reconsidered by the Special Criminal Court, this time by a different three-judge panel.

The case was allocated to a three-judge panel at the Supreme Court on 16 November 2020.

On 4 December 2020, Zsuzsová was convicted by a first-degree court of participation in the 2010 murder of László Basternák, ex-mayor of Hurbanovo. She was sentenced to 21 years in prison. Her sentence was later confirmed by the Supreme Court.

On 12 January 2021, the Supreme Court confirmed the sentence of 19 years and a €10,000 fine for Kočner in the case of forging of promissory notes involving Markíza - Slovakia. He therefore also remains in prison. Other criminal proceedings are ongoing against both him and Zsuzsová.

Peter Kubina replaced Daniel Lipšic as the attorney of Kuciak's parents, as Lipšic was elected Special Prosecutor of the Slovak Republic on 5 February 2021.

On 15 June 2021, the Supreme Court confirmed the sentence of 25 years in a maximum-security prison for Szabó and overturned the acquittal of Kočner and Zsuzsová, returning the case to the Special Criminal Court for further consideration. The court explained its decision by noting that the first-degree court came to its verdict prematurely, did not clearly establish the facts of the case, did not deal with all circumstances of the case, did not intelligibly explain its verdict, did not consider all the evidence, evaluated the evidence which it did consider in an unlawful manner which led to an incorrect legal conclusion resulting in acquittal, and unlawfully evaluated evidence not presented before the court during the trial. The Supreme Court further reasoned that the first-degree court evaluated the evidence in a manner at odds with elementary logic, instead of describing and chronologically evaluating the evidence. The case will be retried by the same three-judge panel of the first-degree court whose ruling was overturned. The prosecution, the parents of Kuciak and Kušnírová, and various Slovak public officials including President Čaputová welcomed the verdict.

=== Second trial (merged cases) ===
Cooperating with the investigators during the investigation following his arrest, Zoltán Andruskó described the planned murders of prosecutor Maroš Žilinka, attorney Daniel Lipšic and prosecutor Peter Šufliarsky. According to Andruskó's testimony, Zsuzsová ordered the murders of Žilinka and Lipšic in autumn 2017 and paid him a €20,000 deposit. They were to be killed at the same time if they met, and if not, Žilinka was to be prioritized. The promised sums for the murders were €70,000 for the murder of Žilinka (with an extra €10,000 promised for the murder of each of his family members) and €200,000 for the murder of Lipšic. After being turned down by his Hungarian acquaintance, Andruskó went on to task Szabó and Marček with these murders. They accepted but did not act for two months. He then asked his acquaintance Dušan Kracina from Komárno to arrange Žilinka's murder. Kracina allegedly arranged the murder with Serbian accomplices, but Andruskó halted it shortly before it was carried out, out of fear. Andruskó kept telling Zsuzsová that Žilinka's murder was still being planned. Zsuzsová then ordered the murder of Ján Kuciak through Andruskó, which was carried out by Szabó and Marček. In the summer of 2018, Zsuzsová tasked Andruskó with the murder of prosecutor Peter Šufliarsky, for which she promised a €100,000 reward. Szabó and Marček were supposed to carry out the murder, initially planning to use an explosive planted in a garbage can in front of Šufliarsky's house. Andruskó was unable to acquire an explosive, so they acquired a gun. They monitored Šufliarsky until their arrest in September 2018 in the Kuciak case.

These crimes were initially included in the investigation of the murders of Kuciak and Kušnírová. The investigation was reallocated by Minister of Interior Denisa Saková to the Ministry of Interior's Office of the Inspection Service in February 2019, an action Lipšic criticized. In September 2020, the case was returned to the National Criminal Agency (NAKA) for investigation. Žilinka and Šufliarsky have said they believe the motive behind the ordering of their murders was their prosecution work. Lipšic expressed the belief that the person who ordered his murder was Kočner. The individuals charged with these crimes are Kočner, Zsuzsová, Szabó, Kracina and a Bosnian national identified as Darko Dragić. The investigation was concluded and the case was submitted to the Specialized Criminal Court by the supervising prosecutor in September 2021.

The case relating to the planned murders was subsequently merged with the Kuciak case at the Specialized Criminal Court. The whole case was tried by the same panel, as the Kuciak case was considered to be the older case. One of the original judges in the three-judge panel was replaced, as they had been indisposed long-term. The trial took place over 36 days starting on 14 April 2022.

- Kočner, Zsuzsová, Kracina and Dragić pleaded not guilty. Tomáš Szabó, who had already been sentenced to 25 years in prison, pleaded guilty and was excluded from the proceedings, with a decision on his case to be made separately. Zlata Kušnírová, the mother of Martina Kušnírová, was excluded from the case; she was deemed ineligible to claim any damages, since the death of her daughter was due to the actions of Miroslav Marček, who had already been sentenced, and not ordered by any of the accused. Her attorney Roman Kvasnica continued to participate in the trial by co-representing the parents of Kuciak alongside attorney Peter Kubina.
- Prosecutor General Maroš Žilinka testified that he had not noticed anything unusual at the time his murder was supposed to be ordered, apart from the front axle of his car missing screws on one occasion. He was a prosecutor of the Bureau of the Special Prosecution working on several cases of economic crime involving Kočner. Special Prosecutor Daniel Lipšic, who was an attorney at the time, testified about his relationship with Kočner. Peter Šufliarsky, formerly the Deputy Prosecutor General, also testified.
- Jozef Kuciak testified about his relationship with his son, since he and his wife were claiming damages.
- Zoltán Andruskó (already convicted) testified over four days, describing the events of 2017 and 2018. He testified that his testimony had never changed, and he had always claimed that Alena Zsuzsová ordered the murders for Kočner.
- Miroslav Marček (already convicted) refused to testify, but his previous testimonies were read as evidence.
- Tomáš Szabó (already convicted) testified, verifying Andruskó's testimony. He confirmed that Andruskó tasked him and Marček to carry out the murder of Žilinka, but that they had not acted on this after Andruskó began pressuring them into the murder, also promising money for the murder of his family, which Szabó and Marček rejected. The murder of Lipšic was to be carried out in the future, with no actual steps taken to carry it out at the time. Szabó also confirmed Andruskó had tasked them with Šufliarsky's murder after the killing of Kuciak and Kušnírová in February 2018. They followed his car multiple times and surveilled his house, originally planning to use an explosive, then planning to use a firearm, before being taken into custody.
- Iľja Weiss, the brother of Slavomír Weiss who was convicted for running a drug trafficking group in Sereď, testified about his encounter with Darko Dragić in 2018. He said that he was approached by Weiss about providing him a car which the former would use during an escape after committing a crime in Piešťany. Weiss did not specify what the crime was supposed to be, only that he thought Dragić wanted to perhaps beat someone or commit theft. According to Weiss, Dragić mentioned someone influential from Piešťany and that there was to be a strong public reaction after the crime. Weiss also said that ultimately he did not provide Dragić with a car as he didn't pay him and they did not discuss this further. According to the prosecution, this testimony proved Dragić's involvement in the preparations for Žilinka's murder.
- Men involved in carrying out the surveillance of journalists including Kuciak at the behest of Peter Tóth on Kočner's behalf testified.
- An IT expert testified about obtaining evidence from USB sticks and Kočner's phones.
- An expert on coded language testified about the communication between Kočner and Zsuzsová via the encoded Threema app.
- Various other witnesses testified, including Andruskó's girlfriend, a Hungarian man named László Krecsik who confirmed that Andruskó approached him about Žilinka's murder which he refused to participate in, and the former partner of Zsuzsová.
- Peter Tóth refused to testify and his previous testimony was read as evidence.
- The lead investigator of the Kuciak case Peter Juhás testified about how the investigation was carried out.
- Zoltán Andruskó and Iľja Weiss testified again.
- Kočner and Zsuzsová testified, denying their guilt. They agreed to answer the questions of the judges, however Zsuzsová refused to answer any questions posed by the prosecutors or the attorneys of Kuciak's parents. Kočner also answered some questions of the prosectution. Dragić and Kracina also testified.
- All sides presented closing arguments.

On 19 May 2023, the first-degree court issued its verdict in the combined trial. Kočner was acquitted of ordering the murders, with the court reasoning there was a lack of conclusive evidence needed for conviction. Zsuzsová was found guilty of ordering the murders of prosecutor Maroš Žilinka, Ján Kuciak and prosecutor Peter Šufliarsky. She was sentenced to a summary sentence of 25 years in a maximum-security prison. Dušan Kracina was found guilty of planning the murder of Žilinka and was sentenced to eight years in prison in a medium-security prison. Darko Dragić was acquitted of taking part in the planning of Žilinka's murder for insufficient evidence and released from custody. All the accused were acquitted of planning the murder of Lipšic, with the court reasoning that this was only considered hypothetically, and no actual steps were taken towards carrying it out. The prosecutors, as well as Zsuzsová and Kracina, appealed against the verdict.

President Zuzana Čaputová stated that she was disappointed and surprised by the verdict, but also highlighted the importance of respecting the verdict of the court and waiting for the court's full written reasoning of the verdict, as well as the subsequent verdict of the Supreme Court.

Prime Minister Ľudovít Ódor stated that while he personally had mixed feelings about the verdict, he fully respected the decision of the court, adding that the road to justice would continue.

==== Appeal to the Supreme Court ====
On Tuesday 20 May 2025, the Supreme Court overturned the verdict and ordered the case to be retried by a new panel of judges due to the first-degree court's unclear factual findings, failure to present all necessary evidence to fully establish the facts of the case, and failure to address all circumstances relevant to the verdict.

== Related cases ==
=== Surveillance of journalists ===
Marian Kočner, Peter Tóth, and the three men who formed a group organized by Tóth were charged with misdemeanors by the National Criminal Agency over the surveillance of a group of individuals, mainly journalists, among them Ján Kuciak. The misdemeanor with which they are charged is classified in Slovak law as a "violation of the confidentiality of oral speech, and of the confidentiality of other manifestations of a personal nature".

The prosecutor submitted the case to the Bratislava City Court in January 2024. The case involves 28 injured parties.

== Awards and legacy ==
Ján Kuciak was given various awards:

- Special Award of the Journalism Award 2017 and the Investigative Journalism Fund at the Open Society Foundation, in memoriam.
- Kuciak and Kušnírová received a Special Hanno R. Ellenbogen Citizenship Award in memoriam, presented jointly by the Prague Society for International Cooperation and the Global Panel Foundation on 30 August 2018.
- Goldene Victoria 2018 - Pressefreiheit, in memoriam (German media award in the press freedom category).
- Biela Vrana 2018, in memoriam (award given for a socially beneficial and courageous civic act by Aliancia Fair-play and VIA IURIS).
- Order of Ľudovít Štúr, 1st Class (awarded by President Andrej Kiska).
- The Best Investigative Article, the Czecho-Slovak Award of the Public and the Open Society Award for the article Talianska mafia na Slovensku. Jej chápadlá siahajú aj do politiky (English: Italian mafia in Slovakia. Its tentacles reach also into politics), all awarded posthumously at the Open Society Foundation's Journalism Award 2018.
- The US Embassy in Slovakia renamed its annual Transparency Award to Ján Kuciak Memorial Transparency Award in honor of the murdered journalist.

Ján Kuciak Memorial Transparency Award
Year	Recipient	Occupation
2018	Ján Kuciak, in memoriam	investigative journalist for Aktuality.sk
2019	Adam Valček	investigative journalist for SME
2020	Jaroslav Macek	Chair of the District Court in Žilina
2022	Vladimír Špánik	former chair of Association of Towns and Municipalities of Slovakia; retiree fighting against corruption at a local level
2023	Ján Jenčo	outgoing head of the Slovak Environment Inspectorate (SIZP)

- Ringier Axel Springer Media established an annual award in Kuciak's name to recognize impactful journalism in Central and Eastern European countries.

#AllForJan Award
Year	Recipient	Awarded for
2020	Tomasz and Marek Sekielski	Tell No One, documentary about child sexual abuse in the Catholic Church in Poland
2021	Telex.hu	Fact-based news portal advocating for freedom of the press in Hungary
2022	Andrei Popoviciu	Article ‘They can see us in the dark’: migrants grapple with hi-tech fortress EU published in The Guardian
2023	Anna Myroniuk and Alexander Khrebet	Investigative reporting of leadership misconduct in the Ukrainian International Legion

- Anton Srholec Freedom Award in memoriam (Cena Slobody Antona Srholca), awarded to Ján Kuciak and Martina Kušnírová by the administration of the Trnava Region.

Silenced (Slovak: Umlčaní), written by Marek Vagovič et al. and published in 2018, is a book which tells the story of Kuciak and Kušnírová. The book details their lives, Kuciak's investigative work, as well as the murder and its investigation up until the time of publication.

The association Investigative Center of Ján Kuciak (ICJK) began their activity in January 2019. Its goals are uncovering organized crime and its connections to politicians or public institutions, and cooperation with other investigative centers (such as OCCRP).

We Have Had Enough! was a short lived political party in Slovakia formed out of the protests, taking its name from a slogan used by protesting farmers.

Scumbag (Slovak: Sviňa) is a 2020 thriller directed by Mariana Čengel Solčanská and Rudolf Biermann, based on the novel of the same name by Arpád Soltész. Both the novel and the film were partially inspired by Kuciak's murder and related events.

The Killing of a Journalist (2022) is an English language documentary film directed by Matt Sarnecki. The film documents the investigation of the murder within the contemporary political and social context and the criminal proceedings up until the first-degree court's acquittal of Kočner and Zsuzsová.

Murder of Ján and Martina - Investigation (2024) is a book written by Laura Kellö Kalinská, an investigative journalist working for the online news portal Aktuality.sk. It documents the investigation of the crime in detail.

In 2026, documents released as part of the Epstein files included an email sent by Jeffrey Epstein to Steve Bannon on 15 March 2018, in which he refers to the fall of the Slovak government "as planned", days before the government fell.

== See also ==
- Daphne Caruana Galizia, Maltese investigative journalist murdered in 2017
- List of journalists killed in Europe
- Assassination of Róbert Remiáš
- Velvet Revolution
