= Ján Packa (police officer) =

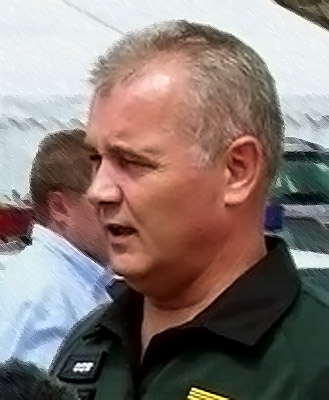

President of the Slovak Police Force
- In office 7 August 2006 – 19 July 2010
- President: Ivan Gašparovič
- Preceded by: Anton Kulich
- Succeeded by: Jaroslav Spišiak

Personal details
- Born: August 25, 1956 (age 69) Nitra, Czechoslovakia

Ján Packa (born 25 August 1956) is the former president of the Slovak Police Force the National Police in Slovakia.

Packa joined the Sbor národní bezpečnosti (National Security Corps) in 1976. In 1982, he became Head of the Department of Traffic Protection in Bratislava. Packa assumed office in August 2006 and his term ended in 2010 when he retired.

As of 2013, he works in the Ministry of Interior of the Slovak Republic.

== See also ==
- List of presidents of the Slovak Police Force
