= List of presidents of the Slovak Police Force =

The president or chief of police is the head of the national police, the Slovak Police Force, in Slovakia. The incumbent president is Jana Maškarová, who became the first woman to hold the office when she took over in 2025.

== List ==
President	Image	Tenure begin	Tenure end
František Krajča		18 August 1992	16 March 1994
Štefan Lastovka		16 March 1994	3 January 1995
Jozef Holdoš		3 January 1995	1 July 1997
Peter Nemec		1 July 1997	2 November 1998
Ján Pipta		3 November 1998	31 May 2001
Pavel Zajac		1 June 2001	29 October 2002
Anton Kulich		30 October 2002	7 August 2006
Ján Packa		8 August 2006	17 July 2010
Jaroslav Spišiak		19 July 2010	14 May 2012
Tibor Gašpar		15 May 2012	31 May 2018
Milan Lučanský		31 May 2018	31 August 2020
Peter Kovařík		21 January 2021 (served as interim President from 1 September 2020 to 21 January 2021)	15 September 2021
Štefan Hamran		1 April 2022 (served as interim President from 16 September 2021 to 31 March 2022)	26 October 2023
Ľubomír Solák		1 December 2023 (served as interim President from 15 November 2023 to 30 November 2023)	18 January 2025
Rastislav Polakovič		18 January 2025 (served as interim President from 27 October 2023 to 14 November 2023)	27 January 2025
Jana Maškarová		21 October 2025 (served as interim President from 28 January 2025 to 20 October 2025)	incumbent
