= Aktuality.sk =

Slovak news website

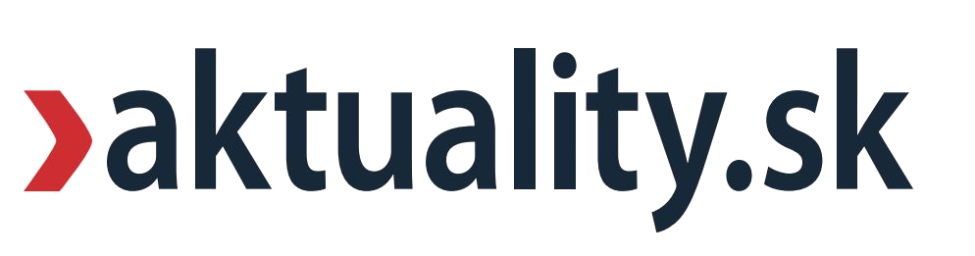
- Type: Online newspaper
- Owner: Ringier
- Founder: Milan Dubec
- Editor-in-chief: Peter Bárdy
- Founded: 2005
- Language: Slovak
- Headquarters: Bratislava, Slovakia
- Website: www.aktuality.sk

Aktuality.sk is a Slovak news website covering current affairs, politics, economy, and lifestyle.

According to Similarweb, aktuality.sk is the most-visited news website in Slovakia. In 2017, the brand launched both iOS and Android mobile applications with an audio player for articles.

As of August 2023, Akatuality.sk is the most visited news website in Slovakia. Headquartered in Bratislava, it is owned by the Swiss media company Ringier.

== History ==
Aktuality.sk was founded in 2005 in Žilina by Milan Dubec. Peter Bárdy was appointed editor-in-chief in 2008. It was later incorporated into the Ringier Axel Springer Media AG joint venture in 2010.

In 2015, Aktuality.sk set up an investigative journalism team, including included the seven-time award-winning journalist Marek Vagovič and Ján Kuciak. After Kuciak's assassination, the publisher expanded its scope in the field of investigative journalism and political commentary. It references #AllForJan in honour of his memory. The motivation for the murder was his investigation into tax fraud in Slovakia.

On 28 February 2018, Aktuality.sk published the last incomplete article by Kuciak which concerned the collaborative activities between Viliam Jasaň, Secretary of the Slovak National Security Council and Mária Trošková, former model and Personal Assistant to Prime Minister Robert Fico with the Italian mafia. For these investigations, Aktuality.sk won the 39th Ischia International Journalism Award.

In 2021, Ringier reacquired all of Axel Springer's shares in Slovak companies, including Aktuality.sk. The former now operates Aktuality.sk through its local subsidiary, Ringier Slovakia Media, of which Michal Maruska is the managing director.

In December 2022, Aktuality.sk launched "Aktuality Plus", where readers can pay a subscription fee to receive exclusive content, but most of them remain free to view.

== Awards ==
- Premio Ischia international journalism award (2018)
- Axel-Springer-Preis (2018)

== See also ==
- List of news websites in Slovakia
