= Tibor Gašpar =

Slovak police officer and politician

Deputy Speaker of the National Council
- Incumbent
- Assumed office 27 June 2024 Serving with Andrej Danko, Michal Šimečka, Peter Žiga and Martin Dubéci
- Speaker: Peter Žiga (acting); Richard Raši

Member of the National Council
- Incumbent
- Assumed office 25 October 2023

President of the Police of Slovakia
- In office 15 May 2012 – 31 May 2018
- President: Ivan Gašparovič; Andrej Kiska
- Preceded by: Jaroslav Spišiak
- Succeeded by: Milan Lučanský

Personal details
- Born: 23 April 1962 (age 64) Kežmarok, Czechoslovakia
- Party: Direction – Social Democracy
- Spouse: Iveta Gašparová
- Children: Pavol Gašpar
- Education: Comenius University, graduated 1987

Tibor Gašpar (born 23 April 1962) is a Slovak police officer and politician. He was the President of police of Slovakia from 2012 to 2018. He has served as a Member of the National Council since 2023.

== Early life ==
Gašpar was born in Kežmarok, then Czechoslovakia. He attended Comenius University (Slovak: Univerzita Komenského) from 1982 until he graduated in 1987.

== President of Police ==
Gašpar assumed office on 15 May 2012. Over his tenure he has led many high-level investigations, including investigations into corruption and theft within the Government of Slovakia. In February 2018, Gašpar and the Slovak Police came under international media attention after the murder of journalist Ján Kuciak. Gašpar announced that his killing was likely to "have something to do with [Kuciak’s] investigative activities". At the time of his murder, Kuciak was working on a report about the Slovak connections of the 'Ndrangheta. The National Police and Government offered €1 million for information leading to the arrest of the murderers. Gaspar resigned in April 2018

== Political career ==
Gašpar was alleged to run for SMER-SD in 2020 Slovak parliamentary election. Whilst that did not happen, in 2023, Robert Fico invited Gašpar to run for the party ahead of 2023 Slovak parliamentary election.

== Purgatory corruption case ==
In 2020, Gašpar was charged in the so-called Purgatory case, a high-profile corruption trial alleging that he and businessman Norbert Bödör created and led an organised criminal network inside the Slovak police. Prosecutors claim the group obstructed investigations, manipulated police work, and shielded political and business allies. The trial has been described as a landmark test of Slovakia’s ability to confront systemic corruption.

== Allegations of politicisation ==
Observers and prosecutors have accused Gašpar of overseeing a politicised police force during his leadership. Reports allege that criminal probes were obstructed or selectively pursued to protect allies of the ruling party.

== Nepotism concerns ==
In 2024 Gašpar’s son, Pavol Gašpar, was appointed as head of Slovakia’s intelligence service. The decision prompted accusations of nepotism and sparked criticism that security institutions were being politicised.

== Controversial statements ==
In September 2025, Gašpar compared Ukraine to Hamas during a televised debate, claiming that Russia's invasion of Ukraine had been "provoked". The remarks were widely condemned in Slovakia and internationally as echoing Kremlin propaganda narratives.

== See also ==
- List of presidents of the Slovak Police Force
- Slovak Police Force
- Murder of Ján Kuciak
