= Milan Lučanský =

Slovak police officer (1969–2020)

President of the Slovak Police Force
- In office 31 May 2018 – 31 August 2020
- President: Andrej Kiska
- Preceded by: Tibor Gašpar
- Succeeded by: Peter Kovařík (interim)

Personal details
- Born: 10 February 1969 Poprad, Czechoslovakia
- Died: 30 December 2020 (aged 51) Prešov, Slovakia
- Spouse: Martina Lučanská
- Children: Adam Lučanský
- Education: Matej Bel University

Milan Lučanský (10 February 1969 – 30 December 2020) was a Slovak police officer who was the President of police of Slovak Police Force from 31 May 2018 to 31 August 2020.

== Death ==
29 December, Lučanský was supposed to visit a psychologist, this examination didn't imply that he would want to commit suicide. At 16:30, his cell was checked. At 16:39 it was noticed that he didn't take his food and at 16:40 his cell was opened and an attempt to save his life began. Rescuers managed to revive him and he was transferred to University hospital with policlinic J. A. Reiman in Prešov. Lučanský died a day after he tried hanging himself in his cell on 30 December 2020.

== See also ==
- List of presidents of the Slovak Police Force
- Slovak Police Force
