= Jaroslav Spišiak =

Slovak police force President and Vice President

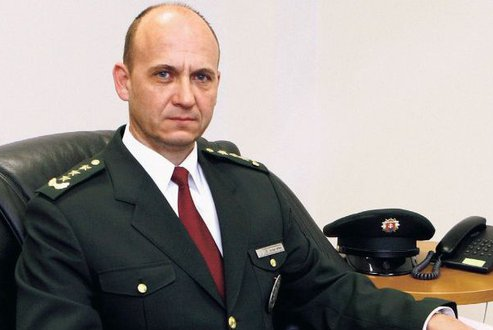

Member of the Slovak National Council
- Incumbent
- Assumed office 25 October 2023

President of the Slovak Police Force
- In office 19 July 2010 – 15 May 2012
- President: Ivan Gašparovič
- Preceded by: Ján Packa
- Succeeded by: Tibor Gašpar

Vice President of the Slovak Police Force
- In office 2001 – 18 July 2010

Personal details
- Born: November 4, 1963 (age 62) Želiezovce, Czechoslovakia
- Education: Police Academy in Bratislava

Jaroslav Spišiak (born 4 November 1963) is a Slovak former police force President and Vice President throughout most of the 2000s. He has served as a Member of the National Council since 2023.

Spišiak attended the Academy of the Police College in Bratislava and graduated in 1995. He also attended university at Akadémia Policajného zboru v Bratislave in Rača.

He was appointed as the first Vice President of the Slovak Police Force by Interior Minister Ivan Šimko in 2001. He served in that position for a majority of the 2000s until he was named the President of the Force in 2010.

He only remained in office for two years before he was replaced by Tibor Gašpar in 2012.
