= Gregorovce =

Village and municipality in Slovakia

- Municipality
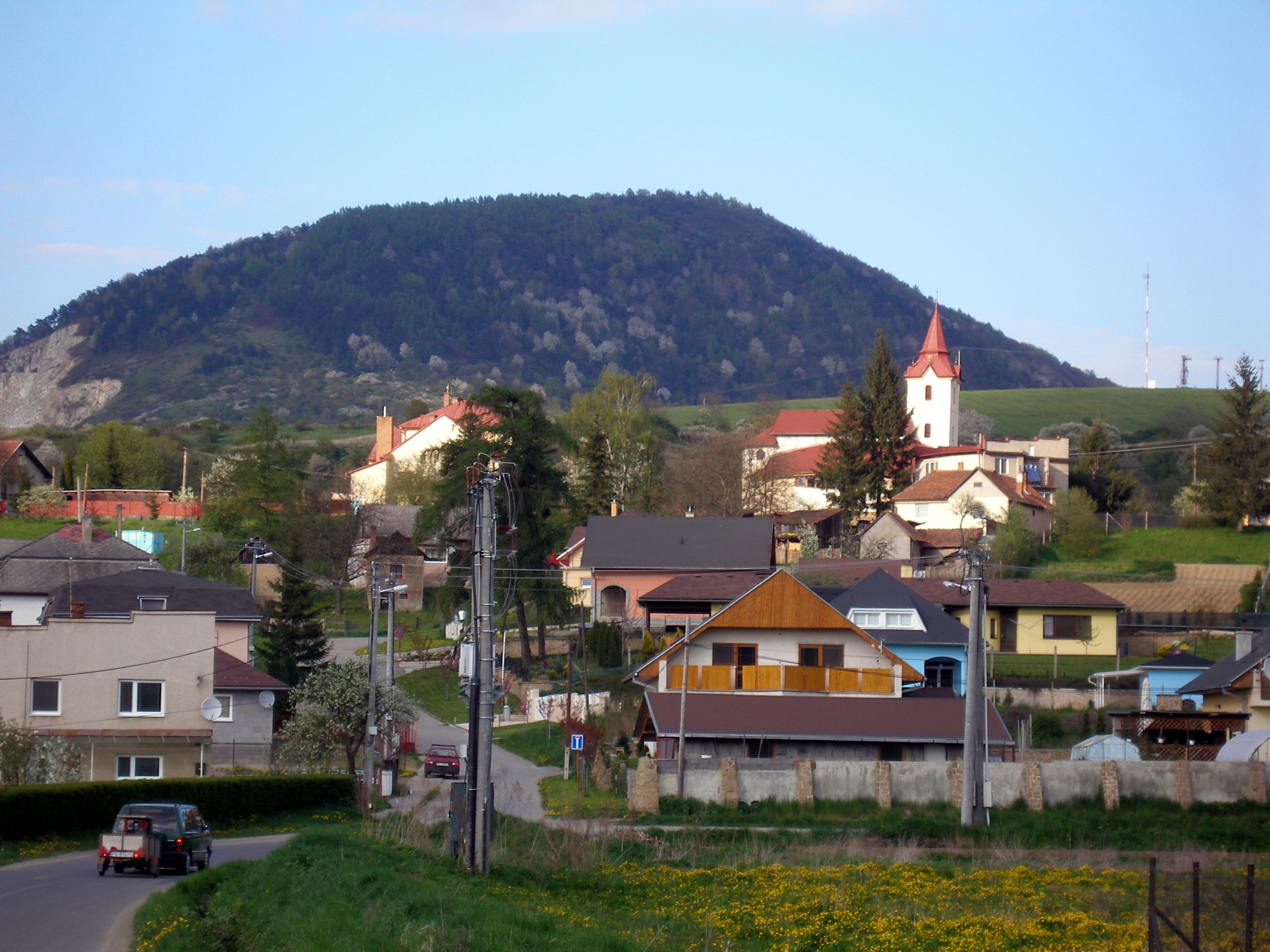

- Flag

- Location of Gregorovce in the Prešov Region Location of Gregorovce in Slovakia
- Coordinates: 49.07°N 21.21°E
- Country: Slovakia
- Region: Prešov Region
- District: Prešov District
- First mentioned: 1248

Area
  - Total: 9.84 km^{2} (3.80 sq mi)
- Elevation: 319 m (1,047 ft)

Population (2025)
  - Total: 947
- Time zone: UTC+1 (CET)
  - Summer (DST): UTC+2 (CEST)
- Postal code: 826 6
- Area code: +421 51
- Vehicle registration plate (until 2022): PO
- Website: www.obecgregorovce.sk

Gregorovce (Hungarian: Gergelylaka) is a village and municipality in Prešov District in the Prešov Region of eastern Slovakia.

== History ==
In historical records the village was first mentioned in 1248.

== Geography ==
The municipality lies at an altitude of 319 metres (1,047 ft) and covers an area of 9.84 km^{2} (3.80 sq mi) (2025).

== Population ==
Population statistic (10 years)
Year	1995	2005	2015	2025
Count	729	798	822	947
Difference		+9.46%	+3.00%	+15.20%

Population statistic
Year	2024	2025
Count	941	947
Difference		+0.63%

It has a population of 947 people (31 December 2025).

=== Ethnicity ===
Census 2021 (1+ %)
Ethnicity	Number	Fraction
Slovak	879	97.88%
Not found out	11	1.22%
Total	898	

In year 2021 was 898 people by ethnicity 879 as Slovak, 11 as Not found out, 6 as Rusyn, 4 as Other, 3 as Ukrainian, 3 as Russian, 2 as Hungarian, 2 as Bulgarian, 1 as German and 1 as Croatian.

Note on population: The difference values of population numbers in the table "Population statistic" and in the sections "Ethnicity" & "Religion" is caused by the use of various statistical methods.

=== Religion ===
Census 2021 (1+ %)
Religion	Number	Fraction
Roman Catholic Church	680	75.72%
None	98	10.91%
Evangelical Church	67	7.46%
Greek Catholic Church	32	3.56%
Not found out	11	1.22%
Total	898	

In year 2021 was 898 people by religion 680 from Roman Catholic Church, 98 from None, 67 from Evangelical Church, 32 from Greek Catholic Church, 11 from Not found out, 6 from Eastern Orthodox Church, 2 from Ad hoc movements, 1 from Calvinist Church and 1 from Other and not ascertained christian church.

== Genealogical resources ==
The records for genealogical research are available at the state archive "Statny Archiv in Presov, Slovakia"

- Roman Catholic church records (births/marriages/deaths): 1740-1895 (parish B)
- Greek Catholic church records (births/marriages/deaths): 1861-1895 (parish B)
- Lutheran church records (births/marriages/deaths): 1720-1895 (parish B)

== See also ==
- List of municipalities and towns in Slovakia
