= Mária Trošková =

Former Slovak model and businesswoman

- Born: 26 April 1987 (age 38); Púchov, Trenčín Region, Slovakia
- Known for: Model, businesswoman, political adviser

Mária Trošková (born 26 April 1987 in Púchov) is a former Slovak model and businesswoman who worked as the chief state adviser in the Office of the Prime Minister of the Slovak Republic Robert Fico. She resigned from her position on 28 February 2018, after media scrutiny of her connection to Italian businessman Antonino Vadalà, a member of the 'Ndrangheta criminal group from Calabria, Italy, who was a suspect in the double murders of Ján Kuciak and Martina Kušnírová.

== Biography ==
She was born on 26 April 1987. She received her university education at the University of Management in Trenčín – at the first (bachelor's) level in the business management study program (completed in 2009), and the second (master's) level of study in the study program knowledge management program (ended in 2011).

Between 1 April 2007, and 1 March 2018, she led a business for the retail sale of jewelry and related services (as of 1 March 2018, this business has ceased activities). She also worked as the co-owner of the company M-Gold, dedicated to the repair and sale of gold and silver jewelry.

In 2007, she made it to the finals of the Miss Universe Slovakia 2007 competition, thanks to which she gained contacts that led her to photo modeling – mainly to showcase swimwear and underwear, but also posing for nudes and erotic pictures, e.g. for Brejk magazine in 2009.

She also worked as an assistant for Pavol Rusko. According to Rusko's statements, after about three months of work, Trošková met "a businessman of Italian origin, who, among other things, was involved in solar power plants, and got involved with him".

In August 2011, together with Antonino Vadalà and Vladimír Urban, she founded the company GIA MANAGEMENT, s.r.o., based in Michalovce. She worked at this company until 12 June 2012.

According to Tom Nicholson, Ján Kuciak was working on a story on the group as it had probable links to the 'Ndrangheta criminal group from Calabria in Italy. Kuciak included these findings in a prepared article, which he did not have time to publish, because he and his fiancée were killed by unknown gunmen on 21 February 2018 (see murder of Ján Kuciak and Martina Kušnírová). Kuciak's article was finally published at midnight on 27–28 February 2018.

== Political career ==
From 2014, she worked as an assistant to the then member of the National Council of the Slovak Republic for the Direction – Slovak Social Democracy party member Viliam Jasaň. Questioned about this employment, Jasaň stated to the daily Nový Čas, "a friend recommended this woman to me".

Trošková worked as an assistant to the Prime Minister of the Slovak Republic, Robert Fico, since 2014. From 1 March 2015, she was employed at the Office of the Prime Minister of the Slovak Republic in temporary civil service. She appeared in public for the first time during the Prime Minister's visit to the Military Repair Plant in Trenčín in March 2015. She was given the position of chief state councillor.

After her past activities were revealed, the Government Office of the Slovak Republic refused to disclose her qualifications, previous work experience, salary or exact definition of work duties. This only deepened the critical voices, which pointed out that Trošková lacks the prerequisites for the performance of the position of state councilor and that, given her past as a photo model, she is unworthy of a government office.

In June 2016, on the occasion of the start of the Slovak presidency in the European Council, Trošková participated in the meeting between Robert Fico and Donald Tusk, the President of the European Council. On 3 April 2017, Trošková also participated in a meeting involving German Chancellor Angela Merkel, and later also President Frank-Walter Steinmeier. This was considered highly unusual, as normally, only experienced diplomats attend such meetings. Former Slovak diplomat Ondrej Gažovič told Denník N: "It is not pleasant to be on the other end of the phone when German diplomats suggest that they have a problem with the composition of your delegation. It is not pleasant, especially when you know that they are right. And it is even less pleasant when you realize that the Office of the Government of the Slovak Republic refuses to back down." The Slovakian government denied there being any problems with Trošková's role.

When asked whether Trošková also played a role in the case of mafia connections to Slovak politicians, which was publicized in connection with the murder of Ján Kuciak and Martina Kušnírová, Marek Vagovič answered: "Her role should not be overestimated. Already Pavol Rusko, for whom she once worked, said that she understood very quickly how to get ahead in life." Amid criticism, at a press conference on 27 February 2018, Fico stated he saw no reason to dismiss Trošková. The next day, together with Viliam Jasaň, she announced her (temporary) departure from the Slovak Government Office. In a joint statement, they said: “Associating our names with this heinous act by some politicians or the media is absolutely out of line. We categorically deny any connection with this tragedy. However, since our names are being misused in the political fight against Prime Minister Robert Fico, we have decided to leave our positions at the Government Office of the Slovak Republic pending the investigation into this case."
