= Veľká Mača =

Veľká Mača Nagymácséd
- Municipality
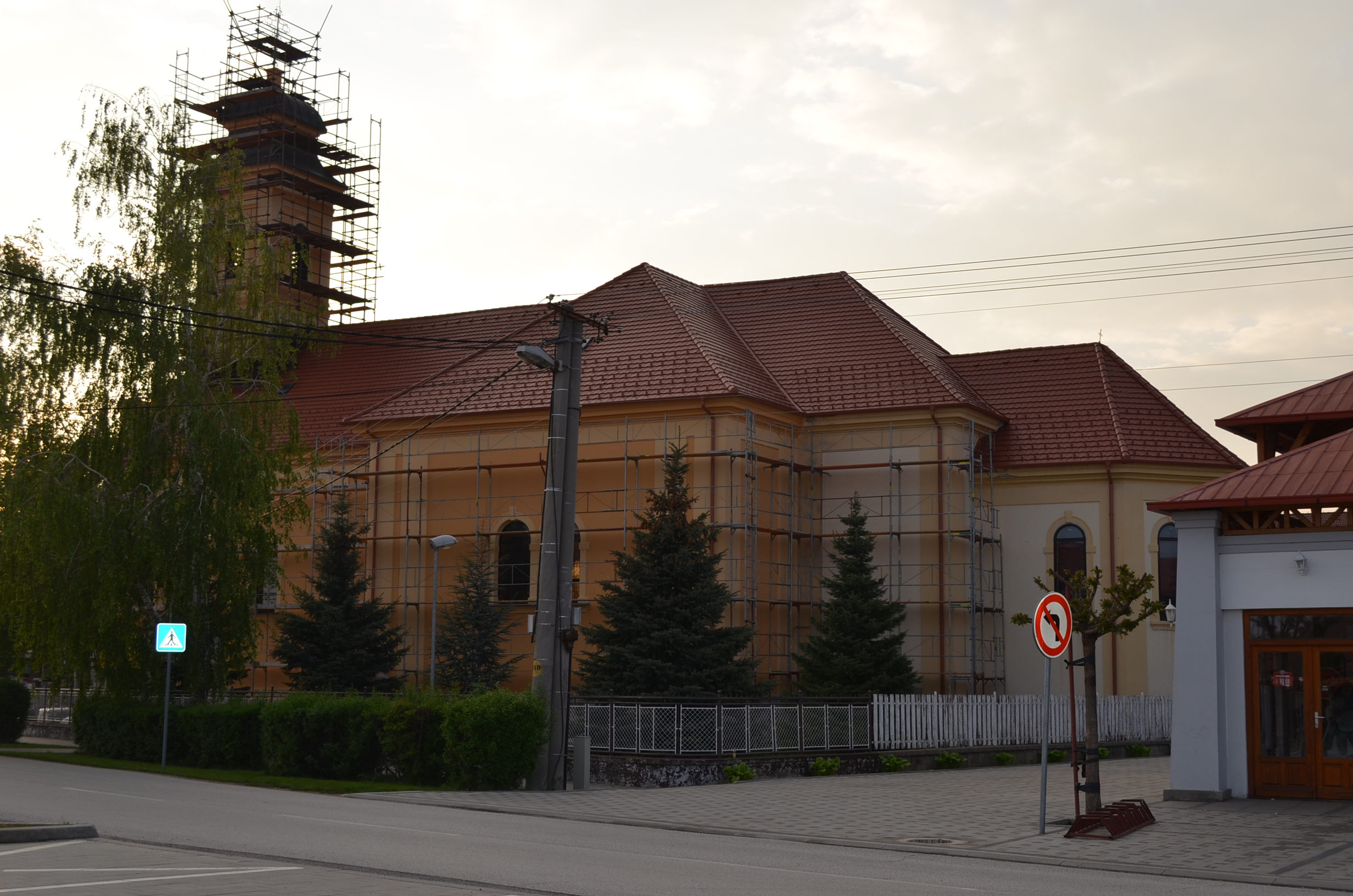

- Flag

- Location of Veľká Mača in the Trnava Region Location of Veľká Mača in Slovakia
- Coordinates: 48.24°N 17.69°E
- Country: Slovakia
- Region: Trnava Region
- District: Galanta District
- First mentioned: 1326

Government
  - Mayor: Dagmar Kosnáčová

Area
  - Total: 14.81 km^{2} (5.72 sq mi)
- Elevation: 123 m (404 ft)

Population (2025)
  - Total: 2,554
- Time zone: UTC+1 (CET)
  - Summer (DST): UTC+2 (CEST)
- Postal code: 925 32
- Area code: +421 31
- Vehicle registration plate (until 2022): GA
- Website: www.velkamaca.sk

Veľká Mača (Hungarian: Nagymácséd) is a village and municipality in Galanta District of the Trnava Region of south-west Slovakia.

== Geography ==
The municipality lies at an altitude of 123 metres (404 ft) and covers an area of 14.81 km^{2} (5.72 sq mi) (2025).

== History ==
In historical records the village was first mentioned in 1326. Before the establishment of independent Czechoslovakia in 1918, it was part of Pozsony County within the Kingdom of Hungary. After the Austro-Hungarian army disintegrated in November 1918, Czechoslovak troops occupied the area, later acknowledged internationally by the Treaty of Trianon. Between 1938 and 1945 Veľká Mača once more became part of Miklós Horthy's Hungary through the First Vienna Award. From 1945 until the Velvet Divorce, it was part of Czechoslovakia. Since then it has been part of Slovakia.

== Population ==
Population statistic (10 years)
Year	1995	2005	2015	2025
Count	2550	2619	2540	2554
Difference		+2.70%	−3.01%	+0.55%

Population statistic
Year	2024	2025
Count	2560	2554
Difference		−0.23%

It has a population of 2554 people (31 December 2025).

=== Ethnicity ===
Census 2021 (1+ %)
Ethnicity	Number	Fraction
Hungarian	1805	69.05%
Slovak	821	31.4%
Not found out	144	5.5%
Total	2614	

In year 2021 was 2614 people by ethnicity 1805 as Hungarian, 821 as Slovak, 144 as Not found out, 8 as Czech, 5 as Romani, 4 as Other, 1 as Serbian, 1 as Austrian, 1 as Polish, 1 as Korean and 1 as Greek.

Note on population: The difference values of population numbers in the table "Population statistic" and in the sections "Ethnicity" & "Religion" is caused by the use of various statistical methods.

=== Religion ===
Census 2021 (1+ %)
Religion	Number	Fraction
Roman Catholic Church	2038	77.96%
None	338	12.93%
Not found out	118	4.51%
Christian Congregations in Slovakia	33	1.26%
Evangelical Church	31	1.19%
Total	2614	

In year 2021 was 2614 people by religion 2038 from Roman Catholic Church, 338 from None, 118 from Not found out, 33 from Christian Congregations in Slovakia, 31 from Evangelical Church, 20 from Greek Catholic Church, 11 from Apostolic Church, 8 from Calvinist Church, 7 from Other and not ascertained christian church, 4 from United Methodist Church, 2 from Other, 2 from Buddhism and 2 from Ad hoc movements.
