= Police Corps (Slovakia) =

National police force of Slovakia

Police Corps Policajný zbor

Agency overview
- Formed: 1993

Jurisdictional structure
- National agency: Slovakia
- Operations jurisdiction: Slovakia
- Governing body: Ministry of Interior of the Slovak Republic

Operational structure
- Headquarters: Bratislava, Slovakia
- Agency executive: gen. JUDr. Jana Maškarová, President of the Police Corps

Facilities
- Stations: Main Headquarters: 1 Regional Headquarters: 8 District Headquarters: 53 Police stations: ~206

The Police Force (Slovak: Policajný zbor, PZ), commonly known as Slovak Republic Police (Slovak: Polícia Slovenskej republiky), is the national police force of Slovakia.

Governed by the Ministry of Interior of the Slovak Republic, the Police Corps is part of and extremely active in both Europol and Interpol.

Along with serving in Slovakia, the Police Corps along with the Customs Administration of the Slovak Republic has been active in neighboring European countries as well, including Austria, Hungary and Poland.

== History ==
The independent police force in Slovakia was established on 1 March 1991 under the name of Police Corps of the Slovak Republic (Slovak: Policajný zbor Slovenskej republiky) by renaming the Slovak part of the Public Security (Slovak: Verejná bezpečnosť).

After the dissolution of Czechoslovakia in the end of 1992, the agency was renamed to Police Corps (Slovak: Policajný zbor) in effect from 1 September 1993. However, in its logo, the old name is still used.

== Equipment ==
=== Vehicles ===
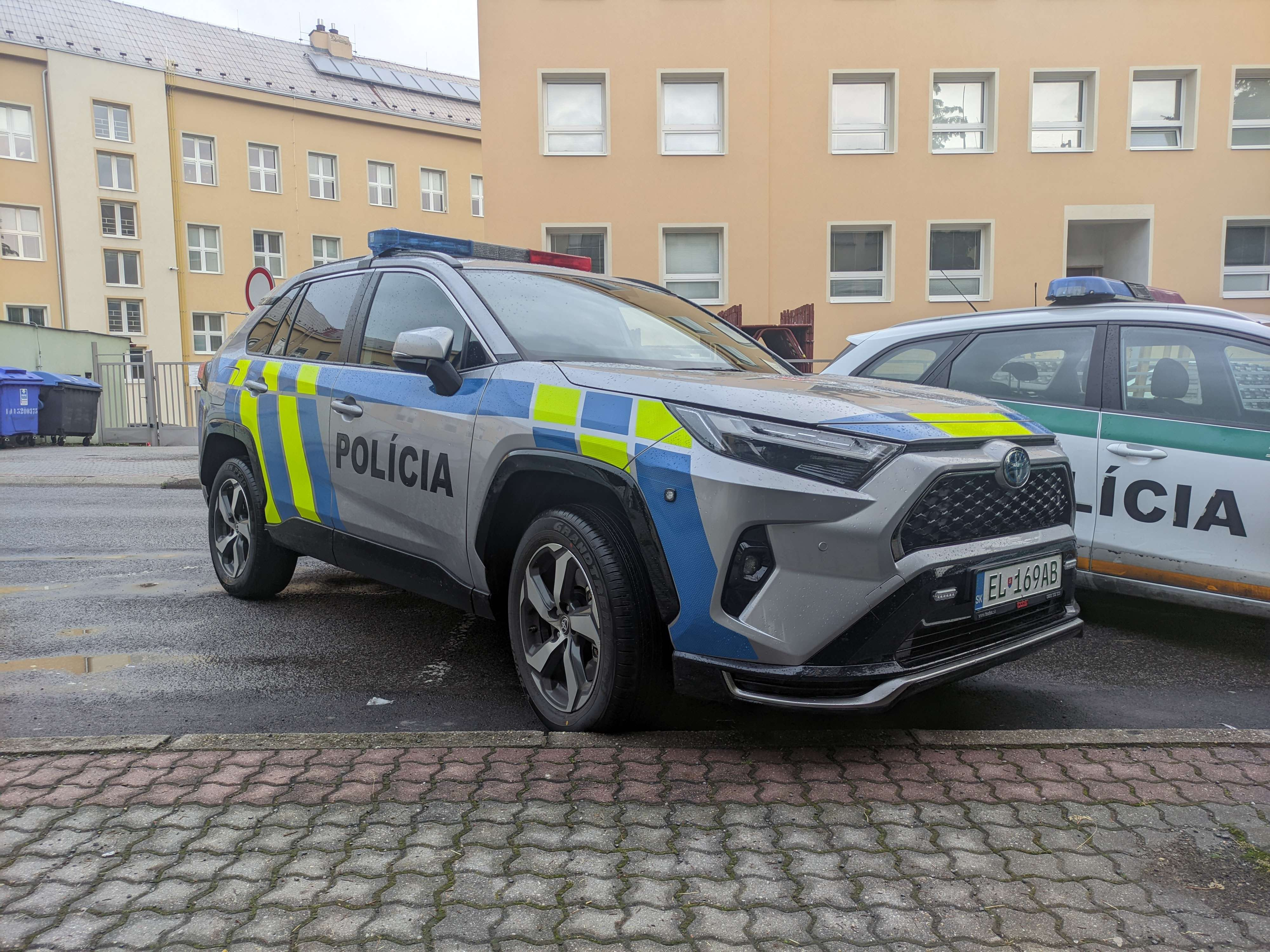
Standard police service vehicle, the Toyota RAV4, in a new livery with a hybrid powertrain, old livery on police car in background.

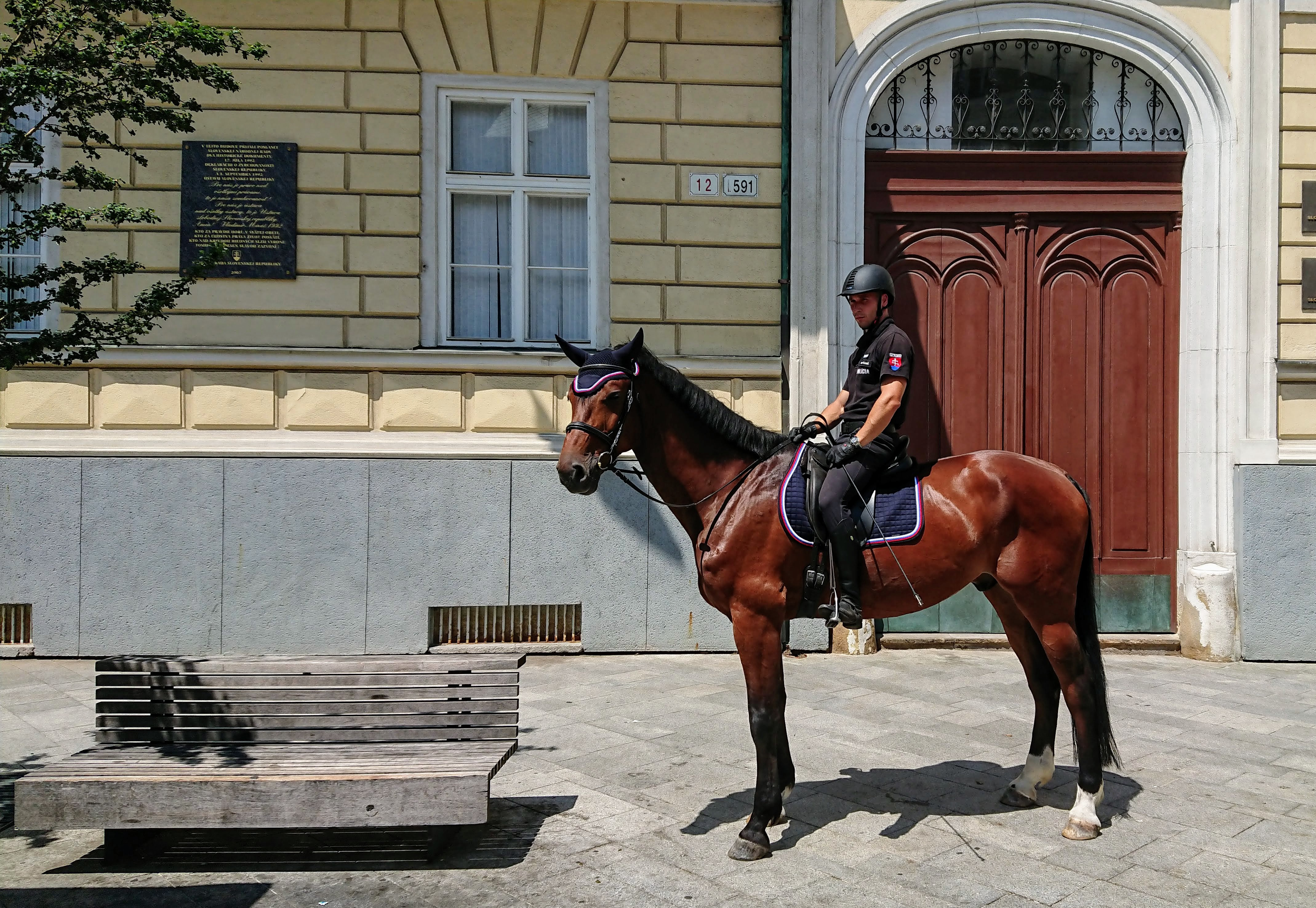
Mounted police in Bratislava

The Police Corps operated the following fleet of vehicles:

- Toyota RAV4
- Volkswagen Passat
- Volkswagen Golf
- Volkswagen Touareg
- Kia Sportage
- Kia Ceed
- Nissan X-Trail T31/T32
- SEAT León
- Škoda Fabia
- Lada Vesta
- GAZ Tigr

=== Weapons ===
Model	Type	Origin
Glock 17	Semi-automatic pistol	Austria
CZ 75	Semi-automatic pistol	Czechoslovakia
Benelli M3	Shotgun	Italy
Heckler & Koch MP5	Submachine gun	Germany
Brügger & Thomet APC	Submachine gun	Switzerland
Vz. 58	Assault rifle	Czechoslovakia

=== Uniform ===
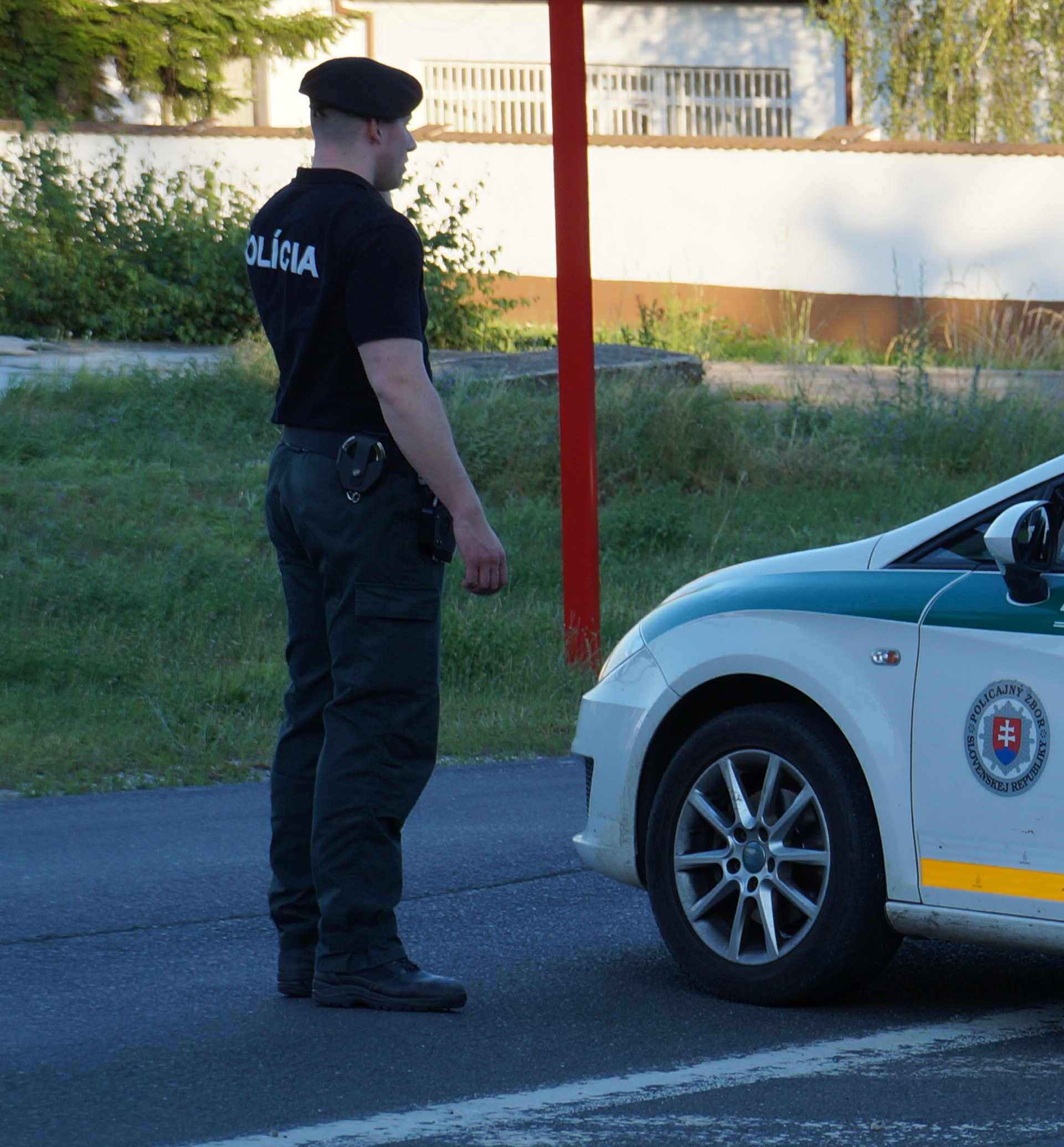
An Officer on duty

Typical Slovak police uniforms consist of a black cap or beret. The vest, shirt or jacket will have Polícia scripted on the reverse and also on front with rank and personal number. A tactical belt and black slacks follow. Black combat boots or shoes depending on region or police function.

Weather also plays a key role, officers typically opt for short sleeves in summer and spring and long sleeve or jackets during the winter months. Uniforms are typically unisex and do not vary from male to female.

== Branches ==
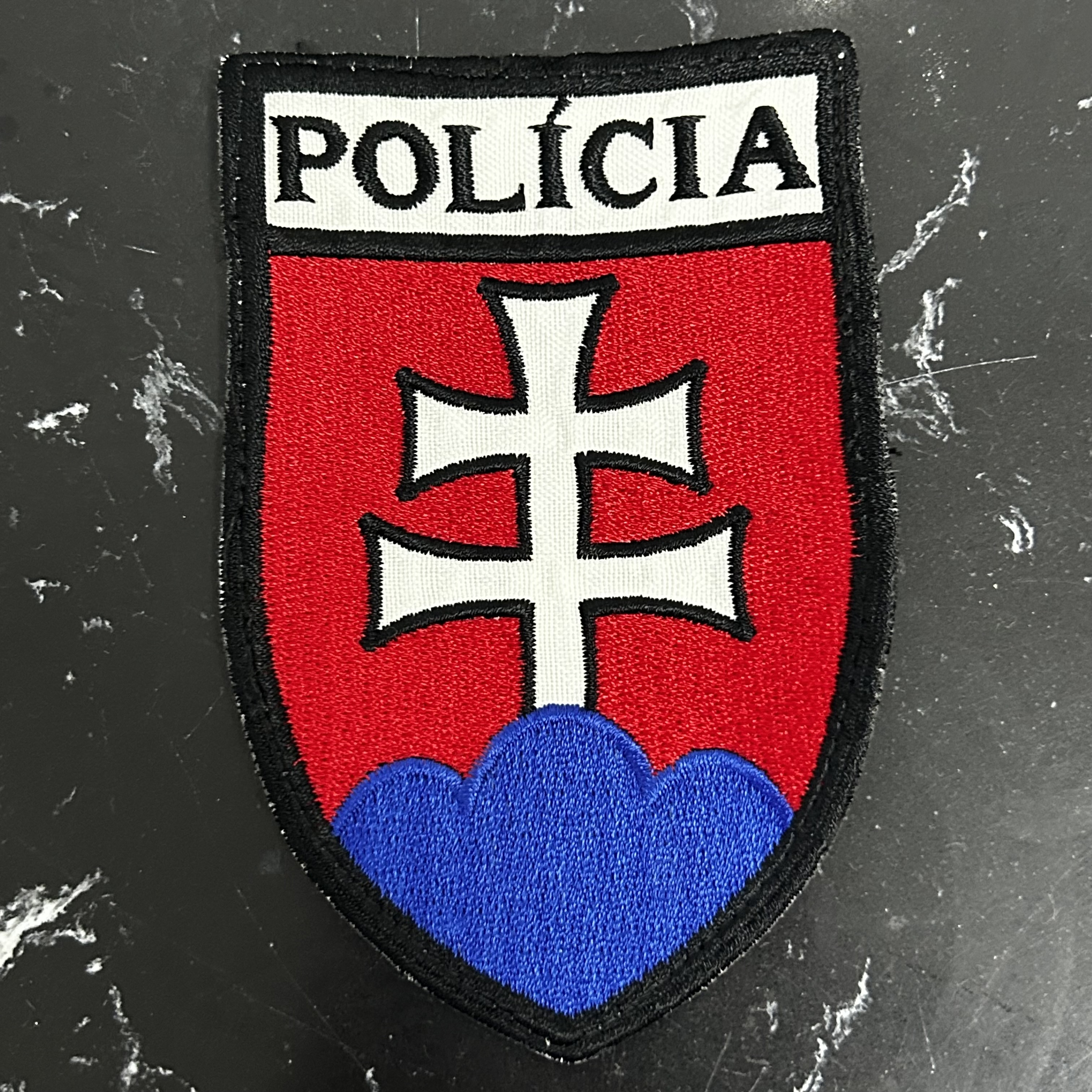
Official patch of Slovak Police Force

Branches within include:

- Public Order Police
- Traffic Police
- Criminal Police
- Border and Foreigner Police
- Organized Crime Bureau
- Protection of Buildings and Facilities
- Toll Police
- Railway Police
- Financial Police
- Office for protection of state officials and diplomatic missions
- Inspection service
- Special forces
  - Police Emergency Units of Riot Police departments of the Regional Police Headquarters of the Police Force (Slovak: Pohotovostné policajné útvary OPP KR PZ)
  - Special protection department of the Office for protection of state officials and diplomatic missions (Slovak: Odbor špeciálnej ochrany Úradu pre ochranu ústavných činiteľov a diplomatických misií MV SR)
  - Special purpose unit Lynx Commando is a counter-terrorism unit with nationwide jurisdiction (Slovak: Útvar osobitného určenie Prezídia Policajného zboru Lynx commando)
