= Elections in Slovakia =

There are five types of elections in Slovakia: municipal elections, regional elections, parliamentary elections, presidential elections and elections to the European Parliament. All five types of elections are normally held after fixed periods, although early elections can occur in certain situations. Elections are conventionally scheduled for a Saturday - the polls normally open at 7:00 in the morning and close at 22:00 in the evening. Citizens aged 18 years or older are eligible to vote. Those serving prison sentences for particularly serious crimes, as well as those deprived of legal capacity (either wholly or in part), including persons with mental disabilities, are denied the right to vote. Citizens with permanent residency in other countries are eligible to vote only in parliamentary elections and national referendums. And only via postal voting.

Voter registration is passive and decentralized with the voter register maintained by municipalities based on the permanent residence register. Voter lists are updated continuously based on municipal records and input provided by state institutions or other municipalities. Voters may verify their data in voter lists, and, if necessary, request correction until the day before election day. On election day, a voter can be added to a voter list upon presenting an identity card with proof of residency. Some 4.4 million voters are registered and eligible to vote in the elections. Voters are only able to vote from abroad during the Parliamentary Elections and national referendums in Slovakia.

== Overall information on the electoral system and elections in Slovakia ==
=== Municipal elections ===
2,904 municipalities make up Slovakia each with a mayor and municipal councilors (20,646). Citizens need to reach the age of 18 at the day of elections and have a permanent residency in their municipalities in order to be able to vote in the municipal elections. After receiving the ballot paper from the electoral commission, the voter is free to select any desired number of candidates - the maximum being the number of the seats in the electoral district (or in the town council in case of a village). As well voters can vote for a mayor. Elections are held every four years.

The latest elections were held on 24 October 2026.

=== Regional elections ===
Slovakia comprises eight self-governing regions. Citizens need to reach the age of 18 at the day of elections and have a permanent residency in their municipalities in order to be able to vote in the regional elections. After receiving the ballot paper from the electoral commission, the voter is free to select any desired number of candidates - the maximum being the number of all the candidates on the ballot paper. In 2017, deputies of the Slovak National Council voted to extend the term of governors from 4 years to 5 years (for the 2017 election only), and change from a 2-round election to only 1 round. After the 2022 regional elections, they will be held every four years together with municipal elections.

The latest elections were held on 24 October 2026.

=== Parliamentary elections ===
Slovakia is a parliamentary republic. Legislative powers are vested in the National Assembly of the Slovak Republic (Slovak: Národná rada Slovenskej republiky, NRSR). The NRSR is of a unicameral body and consists of 150 members of the parliament directly elected by universal adult suffrage for a four-year term office. The prime minister, who serves as the head of government, is appointed by the president, but is accountable solely to the NRSR. The seats at National Assembly are elected by a proportional representation (PR) in a single, nationwide electoral constituency. Slovakia has a multi-party system, with numerous parties in which no one party often has a chance of gaining power alone, and parties must work with each other to form coalition governments. Before the elections, political parties (or coalitions of two or more parties) submit the lists of candidates. Voters may indicate preferences for up to four candidates in one list. The seats at National Council are distributed by Hagenbach-Bischoff method on a nationwide basis - however a threshold of 5% of the votes needs to be met in order for a party to participate in the distribution of National Council seats, whereas coalitions of two to three parties and four or more parties are required to obtain at least seven and ten percent of the vote, respectively.

The latest elections were held on 30 September 2023.

=== Presidential elections ===
Since Slovakia operates under a parliamentary system of government, the president largely possesses only ceremonial functions, but is also equipped with the opportunity to veto legislation (although the veto can be easily overturned by a majority in the parliament). By law, the presidential election should be called no later than 55 days prior to election day. The president serves as a head of state and is directly elected by universal suffrage in a two-stage election. If no candidate obtains an absolute majority of all voters in the first round, then the top two candidates qualify for a runoff election, in which the candidate with the largest number of votes is elected to office for a term of five years. In order to secure a place on the ballot, presidential candidates must be nominated by fifteen members of the National Council, or by a petition signed by 15,000 citizens.

Originally, the National Council chose the president, but a 1999 amendment to the constitution established the popular election of the president by runoff voting. Popular voting for presidential elections was adopted following a prolonged impasse in 1998, in which the National Council repeatedly tried to elect a new president, but no candidate attained the three-fifths majority required by the constitution.

The latest elections was the first round of the 2024 election on 23 March 2024. The second round were held on 6 April 2024.

=== Elections to the European parliament ===
Slovakia is a member of the European Union since 1 May 2004 and therefore witnessed five elections to the European Parliament since. Slovakia gets to elect thirteen members of the European Parliament, using a proportional representation system. During its 15-year membership in the European Union, Slovakia has consistently scored the lowest among the member countries in the turnout rates during European elections. In 2019, when the latest European elections took place, the turnout in Slovakia was only at 23% of registered voters.

The latest elections were held on 8 June 2024.

== Latest elections ==
=== 2024 presidential election ===
Candidate	Party	First round		Second round	
Candidate	Party	Votes	%	Votes	%
Ivan Korčok	Independent	958,393	42.52	1,243,709	46.88
Peter Pellegrini	Voice – Social Democracy	834,718	37.03	1,409,255	53.12
Štefan Harabin	Independent	264,579	11.74		
Krisztián Forró	Hungarian Alliance	65,588	2.91		
Igor Matovič	Slovakia	49,201	2.18		
Ján Kubiš	Independent	45,957	2.04		
Patrik Dubovský	For the People	16,107	0.71		
Marian Kotleba	Kotlebists – People's Party Our Slovakia	12,771	0.57		
Milan Náhlik	Independent	3,111	0.14		
Andrej Danko (Note: Candidate withdrew in favour of Harabin, but was still on the ballot.)	Slovak National Party	1,905	0.08		
Róbert Švec	Slovak Revival Movement	1,876	0.08		
Total		2,254,206	100.00	2,652,964	100.00
Valid votes		2,254,206	99.53	2,652,964	99.35
Invalid/blank votes		10,563	0.47	17,233	0.65
Total votes		2,264,769	100.00	2,670,197	100.00
Registered voters/turnout		4,364,071	51.90	4,368,697	61.12
Source: First Round, Second Round

=== 2023 parliamentary election ===
Results of the 2020 parliamentary election, showing vote strength for each party by district.

=== Composition of the National Council since 1990 ===
Election	Composition of the National Council after elections	Prime Minister
1990	22 / 6 / 48 / 7 / 31 / 14 / 22; KSS / SZ / VPN / DS / KDH / ESWMK / SNS	Vladimír Mečiar (VPN) (Note: until May 1991); Ján Čarnogurský (KDH)
1992	29 / 74 / 18 / 14 / 15; SDĽ / HZDS / KDH / MKM-EGY / SNS	Vladimír Mečiar (HZDS) (Note: until March 1994); Jozef Moravčík (DEÚS)
1994	13 / 18 / 61 / 15 / 17 / 17 / 9; ZRS / SV / HZDS-RSS / DEÚS / KDH / MK / SNS	Vladimír Mečiar (HZDS)
1998	23 / 13 / 43 / 42 / 15 / 14; SDĽ / SOP / HZDS / SDK / SMK-MKP / SNS	Mikuláš Dzurinda (SDK)
2002	11 / 25 / 36 / 15 / 28 / 15 / 20; KSS / Smer / ĽS-HZDS / ANO / SDKÚ / KDH / SMK-MKP	Mikuláš Dzurinda (SDKÚ)
2006	50 / 15 / 31 / 14 / 20 / 20; Smer-SD / ĽS-HZDS / SDKÚ-DS / KDH / SMK-MKP / SNS	Róbert Fico (Smer-SD)
2010	62 / 14 / 28 / 15 / 22 / 9; Smer-SD / Most-Híd / SDKÚ-DS / KDH / SaS / SNS	Iveta Radičová (SDKÚ-DS)
2012	83 / 13 / 11 / 16 / 16 / 11; Smer-SD / Most-Híd / SDKÚ-DS / KDH / OĽaNO / SaS	Róbert Fico (Smer-SD)
2016	49 / 10 / 11 / 19 / 21 / 11 / 15 / 14; Smer-SD / #Sieť / Most–Híd / OĽaNO-NOVA / SaS / SR / SNS / ĽSNS	Róbert Fico (Smer-SD); Peter Pellegrini (Smer-SD)
2020	38 / 12 / 53 / 13 / 17 / 17; Smer-SD / ZĽ / OĽaNO-NOVA-KÚ-ZZ / SaS / SR / K-ĽSNS	Igor Matovič (OĽaNO) Eduard Heger (OĽaNO)
2023	42 / 27 / 32 / 16 / 11 / 12 / 10; Smer-SD / Hlas-SD / PS / OĽaNO / SaS / KDH / SNS	Robert Fico (Smer - SD)

=== 2024 European Parliament election ===
Party	Votes	%	Seats	+/–
Progressive Slovakia	410,844	27.82	6	+4
Direction – Social Democracy	365,794	24.77	5	+2
Republic	185,137	12.53	2	New
Voice – Social Democracy	106,076	7.18	1	New
Christian Democratic Movement	105,602	7.15	1	–1
Freedom and Solidarity	72,703	4.92	0	–2
Democrats	69,204	4.69	0	–2
Hungarian Alliance	57,350	3.88	0	0
Slovakia − For the People	29,385	1.99	0	–1
Slovak National Party	28,102	1.90	0	0
Common Sense	13,867	0.94	0	New
Christian Union	9,313	0.63	0	0
Kotlebists – People's Party Our Slovakia	7,103	0.48	0	–2
Slovak PATRIOT	5,412	0.37	0	New
Communist Party of Slovakia	2,232	0.15	0	0
Volt Slovakia	1,923	0.13	0	New
Socialisti.sk	1,800	0.12	0	New
HEART Patriots and Pensioners	1,274	0.09	0	New
MySlovensko	1,214	0.08	0	New
We Unite the Citizens of Slovakia	1,143	0.08	0	New
Common Citizens of Slovakia	588	0.04	0	New
Slovak People's Party of Andrej Hlinka	486	0.03	0	0
Slovak Democratic and Christian Union	416	0.03	0	–
Total	1,476,968	100.00	15	+1
Valid votes	1,476,968	98.13		
Invalid/blank votes	28,208	1.87		
Total votes	1,505,176	100.00		
Registered voters/turnout	4,377,093	34.39		
Source: Statistical Office of the Slovak Republic

Popular vote
PS	27.82%
Smer-SD	24.77%
Republika	12.53%
Hlas-SD	7.18%
KDH	7.15%
SaS	4.92%
Demokrati	4.69%
MH	3.88%

=== Composition of Slovak MEPs since 2004 ===
Election	Party affiliation of the elected MEPs
2004	PES / EPP-ED / / / NI; 3 / 3 / 3 / 2 / 3; SMER (tretia cesta) / SDKÚ / KDH / SMK-MKP / ĽS-HZDS
2009	PASD / EDP / EPP / / / NI; 5 / 1 / 2 / 2 / 2 / 1; SMER / ĽS-HZDS / SDKÚ-DS / KDH / SMK-MKP / SNS
2014	S&D / EPP group / / / / ECR group; 4 / 1 / 2 / 2 / 1 / 1 / 1 / 1; SMER-SD / Most-Híd / SDKÚ-DS / KDH / SMK-MKP / OĽaNO / NOVA / SaS
2019	S&D / Renew / EPP group / / ECR / NI; 3 / 4 / 2 / 1 / 2 / 2; SMER-SD / PS-SPOLU / KDH / OĽaNO / SaS / ĽSNS
2024	S&D / Renew / EPP / ESN / NI; 5 / 6 / 1 / 2 / 1; SMER-SD / PS / KDH / Republika / HLAS-SD

== See also ==
- Electoral calendar
- Electoral system
