= Prime Minister of Slovakia =

Head of government

Chairman of the Government of the Slovak Republic
- Predseda vlády Slovenskej republiky
- Coat of arms of the Slovak Republic

- Incumbent; Robert Fico since 25 October 2023
- Member of: European Council
- Residence: Episcopal Summer Palace, Old Town, Bratislava
- Appointer: President of the Slovak Republic
- Term length: Four years renewable
- Formation: 1 January 1993
- First holder: Vladimír Mečiar
- Salary: c. 132,000 € per annum (2024)
- Website: vlada.gov.sk

The prime minister of Slovakia, officially the chairman of the government of the Slovak Republic (Slovak: Predseda vlády Slovenskej republiky), commonly referred to in Slovakia as Predseda vlády or informally as Premiér, is the head of the government of the Slovak Republic. Officially, the officeholder is the third-highest constitutional official in Slovakia after the president of the Republic (appointer) and chairman of the National Council; in practice, the appointee is the country's leading political figure.

Since the office was created in 1969, fifteen people have served as head of government. Since 1993, when Slovakia gained independence, nine people have occupied the function. On 25 October 2023, Robert Fico became the prime minister of Slovakia.

== History ==
The office of the prime minister of Slovakia was established in 1969 by the Constitutional Act on the Czechoslovak Federation. A similar office had existed from 1918 when various officials were presiding over executive bodies governing the Slovak part of Czechoslovakia or the Slovak State respectively. Since 1993, when the independent Slovak Republic was established, nine persons have held the office.

Since 25 October 2023, the prime minister of Slovakia has been Robert Fico. Fico is the longest serving prime minister, if the years are counted cumulatively, with over 13 years in total as of today.

== Powers and role ==
Since Slovakia is a parliamentary republic, the prime minister is accountable to the National Council. The Slovak Constitution provides that upon the accession to the office, each prime minister must gain and thereafter maintain the confidence of the Parliament. When the prime minister loses confidence, the president must dismiss him and designate a new prime minister or entrust the dismissed prime minister to act as a caretaker with limited powers.

The prime minister is the most powerful state office since he commands and presides over the government. Although it is not the prime minister but the president who appoints ministers in Cabinet, the president appoints ministers on the prime minister's advice.

== Designated Prime Minister of Slovakia ==
Designated Prime Minister of Slovakia (Slovak: designovaný predseda vlády) is an unofficial title for a person who has been entrusted by the president of the Slovak Republic with forming a new government and replacing the outgoing prime minister. This title, as well as the authorization of the president to entrust the designated prime minister, is not set by an act but is a legal or, more precisely, constitutional tradition. According to this tradition, the president designates a person who has the support of the majority of deputies in the National Council.

== List of prime ministers of Slovakia ==
=== Czecho-Slovak Republic ===
==== Autonomous Land of Slovakia ====
Portrait	Name (Birth–Death)	Term of office			Political party	Ref.
Portrait	Name (Birth–Death)	Took office	Left office	Time in office	Political party	Ref.
	Jozef Tiso (1887–1947)	7 October 1938	9 March 1939	153 days	Slovak People's Party	

=== Slovak Republic (1939–1945) ===
Portrait	Name (Birth–Death)	Term of office			Political party	Ref.
Portrait	Name (Birth–Death)	Took office	Left office	Time in office	Political party	Ref.
	Jozef Tiso (1887–1947)	14 March 1939	17 October 1939	217 days	Slovak People's Party	
	Vojtech Tuka (1880–1946)	27 October 1939	5 September 1944	4 years, 314 days	Slovak People's Party	
	Štefan Tiso (1897–1959)	5 September 1944	4 April 1945	211 days	Slovak People's Party	

=== Czechoslovak Socialist Republic ===
==== Slovak Socialist Republic ====
Portrait	Name (Birth–Death)	Term of office			Political party	Ref.
Portrait	Name (Birth–Death)	Took office	Left office	Time in office	Political party	Ref.
	Štefan Sádovský (1928–1984)	1 January 1969	5 May 1969	124 days	Communist Party of Slovakia	
	Peter Colotka (1925–2019)	5 May 1969	13 October 1988	19 years, 161 days	Communist Party of Slovakia	
	Ivan Knotek (1936–2020)	13 October 1988	23 June 1989	253 days	Communist Party of Slovakia	
	Pavel Hrivnák (1931–1995)	23 June 1989	8 December 1989	168 days	Communist Party of Slovakia	
	Milan Čič (1932–2012)	8 December 1989	6 March 1990	88 days	Communist Party of Slovakia	

=== Czech and Slovak Federative Republic ===
==== Slovak Republic ====
Portrait	Name (Birth–Death)	Term of office			Political party	Elected	Cabinet(s)	Composition	Ref.
Portrait	Name (Birth–Death)	Took office	Left office	Time in office	Political party	Elected	Cabinet(s)	Composition	Ref.
	Milan Čič (1932–2012)	6 March 1990	27 June 1990	113 days	Communist Party of Slovakia	—	Čič	KSS • VPN	
	Vladimír Mečiar (born 1942)	27 June 1990	6 May 1991	313 days	Public Against Violence	1990	Mečiar I	VPN • KDH • DS	
	Ján Čarnogurský (born 1944)	6 May 1991	24 June 1992	1 year, 49 days	Christian Democratic Movement	—	Čarnogurský	VPN • KDH • DS	
	Vladimír Mečiar (born 1942)	24 June 1992	31 December 1992	190 days	Movement for a Democratic Slovakia	1992	Mečiar II	HZDS • SNS	

=== Slovak Republic (since 1993) ===
Portrait	Name (Birth–Death)	Term of office			Political party	Elected	Cabinet(s)	Composition	Ref.
Portrait	Name (Birth–Death)	Took office	Left office	Time in office	Political party	Elected	Cabinet(s)	Composition	Ref.
	Vladimír Mečiar (born 1942)	1 January 1993	15 March 1994	1 year, 73 days	Movement for a Democratic Slovakia	1992	Mečiar II	HZDS • SNS	
	Jozef Moravčík (born 1945)	15 March 1994	13 December 1994	273 days	Democratic Union of Slovakia	—	Moravčík	SDĽ • KDH • DEÚS	
	Vladimír Mečiar (born 1942)	13 December 1994	30 October 1998	3 years, 321 days	Movement for a Democratic Slovakia	1994	Mečiar III	HZDS • SNS • ZRS • RSS	
	Mikuláš Dzurinda (born 1956)	30 October 1998	16 October 2002	7 years, 247 days	Slovak Democratic Coalition	1998	Dzurinda I	SDK • SDĽ • SMK • SOP	
	Mikuláš Dzurinda (born 1956)	16 October 2002	4 July 2006	7 years, 247 days	Slovak Democratic and Christian Union	2002	Dzurinda II	SDKÚ–DS • SMK • KDH • ANO (2002–2006)	
	Mikuláš Dzurinda (born 1956)	16 October 2002	4 July 2006	7 years, 247 days	Slovak Democratic and Christian Union	2002	Dzurinda II	SDKÚ–DS • SMK • ANO (2006)	
	Robert Fico (born 1964)	4 July 2006	8 July 2010	4 years, 4 days	Direction – Social Democracy	2006	Fico I	Smer • SNS • ĽS–HZDS	
	Iveta Radičová (born 1956)	8 July 2010	4 April 2012	1 year, 271 days	Slovak Democratic and Christian Union	2010	Radičová	SDKÚ–DS • SaS • KDH • Most–Híd	
	Robert Fico (born 1964)	4 April 2012	23 March 2016	5 years, 352 days	Direction – Social Democracy	2012	Fico II	Smer	
	Robert Fico (born 1964)	23 March 2016	22 March 2018	5 years, 352 days	Direction – Social Democracy	2016	Fico III	Smer • SNS • Most–Híd • Network (2016)	
	Robert Fico (born 1964)	23 March 2016	22 March 2018	5 years, 352 days	Direction – Social Democracy	2016	Fico III	Smer • SNS • Most–Híd (2016–2018)	
	Peter Pellegrini (born 1975)	22 March 2018	21 March 2020	2 years	Direction – Social Democracy	—	Pellegrini	Smer • SNS • Most–Híd	
	Igor Matovič (born 1973)	21 March 2020	1 April 2021	1 year, 11 days	Ordinary People and Independent Personalities	2020	Matovič	OĽaNO • We Are Family • SaS • For the People	
	Eduard Heger (born 1976)	1 April 2021	15 May 2023	2 years, 44 days	Ordinary People and Independent Personalities	—	Heger	OĽaNO • We Are Family • SaS • For the People (2021–2022)	
	Eduard Heger (born 1976)	1 April 2021	15 May 2023	2 years, 44 days	Ordinary People and Independent Personalities	—	Heger	OĽaNO • We Are Family • For the People (2022–2023)	
	Ľudovít Ódor (born 1976)	15 May 2023	25 October 2023	163 days	Independent	—	Ódor	Technocratic cabinet	
	Robert Fico (born 1964)	25 October 2023	Incumbent	3 years, 11 days	Direction – Social Democracy	2023	Fico IV	Smer • Hlas • SNS	

== See also ==
- President of Slovakia
- List of prime ministers of Czechoslovakia
- List of prime ministers of the Slovak Socialist Republic
