= 1990 Czechoslovak parliamentary election =

← 1986	8–9 June 1990	1992 →
- House of the People
- All 150 seats in the House of the People; 76 seats needed for a majority
- Turnout: 96.24%
Party	Leader	Vote %	Seats
OF	Jan Urban	36.20	68
KSČ	Ladislav Adamec	13.59	23
VPN	Ján Budaj	10.38	19
KDH	Ján Čarnogurský	6.05	11
KDU	Josef Bartončík	5.92	9
HSD–SMS	Boleslav Bárta	5.38	9
SNS	Víťazoslav Móric	3.50	6
Coexistence–MKDM	Miklós Duray	2.79	5
This lists parties that won seats. See the complete results below.
- House of Nations
- All 150 seats in the House of Nations; 76 seats needed for a majority
- Turnout: 96.24%
Party	Leader	Vote %	Seats
OF	Jan Urban	34.03	50
KSČ	Ladislav Adamec	13.68	24
VPN	Ján Budaj	11.89	33
HSD–SMS	Boleslav Bárta	6.20	7
KDU	Ján Čarnogurský	5.96	6
KDH	Josef Bartončík	5.31	14
SNS	Víťazoslav Móric	3.65	9
Coexistence–MKDM	Miklós Duray	2.71	7
This lists parties that won seats. See the complete results below.
Prime Minister before	Prime Minister after
Marián Čalfa; VPN	Marián Čalfa; VPN

Federal elections were held in Czechoslovakia on 8 and 9 June 1990, alongside elections for the Czech and Slovak Assemblies. They were the first elections held in the country since the Velvet Revolution seven months earlier. Voter turnout was 96.2%.

The movement led by President Václav Havel emerged as the largest bloc, with majorities in both houses of parliament, with 87 seats in the House of the People and 83 seats in the House of Nations, something no party or alliance had achieved in a free election. The Czech wing, Civic Forum (OF), won 68 of the 150 seats in the House of the People and 50 of the 150 seats in the House of Nations, whilst its Slovak counterpart, Public Against Violence (VPN), won 19 seats in the House of the People and 33 in the House of Nations. The Communist Party of Czechoslovakia, running in its first election since giving up power, made a stronger showing than expected, receiving 13 percent of the vote in both chambers, finishing second behind Civic Forum.

Although OF and VPN had more than enough seats between them to govern without the support of other parties, they sought a broader base. They let it be known that they were willing to go into coalition with any party except the Communists and the Slovak National Party.

== Results ==
=== House of the People ===
Party	Votes	%	Seats
Civic Forum	3,851,172	36.20	68
Communist Party of Czechoslovakia	1,445,407	13.59	23
Public Against Violence	1,104,125	10.38	19
Christian Democratic Movement	644,008	6.05	11
Christian and Democratic Union	629,359	5.92	9
Movement for Autonomous Democracy–Party for Moravia and Silesia	572,015	5.38	9
Slovak National Party	372,025	3.50	6
Alliance of Farmers and the Countryside	360,779	3.39	0
Czechoslovak Social Democracy	342,455	3.22	0
Green Party	332,974	3.13	0
Coexistence–Hungarian Christian Democratic Movement	296,575	2.79	5
Czechoslovak Socialist Party	201,532	1.89	0
Democratic Party	149,310	1.40	0
People's Democratic Party–Rally for the Republic	76,338	0.72	0
Free Bloc	64,070	0.60	0
Freedom Party	49,012	0.46	0
Electoral Union of Interest Groups	47,971	0.45	0
Czechoslovakian Democratic Forum	23,428	0.22	0
Rómovia	22,670	0.21	0
Civil Liberties Movement	22,165	0.21	0
Movement of Czechoslovakian Understanding	21,979	0.21	0
Friends of Beer Party	8,943	0.08	0
Total	10,638,312	100.00	150
Valid votes	10,638,312	98.73	
Invalid/blank votes	136,629	1.27	
Total votes	10,774,941	100.00	
Registered voters/turnout	11,195,596	96.24	
Source: Nohlen & Stöver

=== House of Nations ===
Party	Votes	%	Seats
Civic Forum	3,613,513	34.03	50
Communist Party of Czechoslovakia	1,452,659	13.68	24
Public Against Violence	1,262,278	11.89	33
Movement for Autonomous Democracy–Party for Moravia and Silesia	658,477	6.20	7
Christian and Democratic Union	633,053	5.96	6
Christian Democratic Movement	564,172	5.31	14
Slovak National Party	387,387	3.65	9
Alliance of Farmers and the Countryside	359,474	3.39	0
Czechoslovak Social Democracy	352,678	3.32	0
Green Party	336,310	3.17	0
Coexistence–Hungarian Christian Democratic Movement	287,426	2.71	7
Czechoslovak Socialist Party	210,735	1.98	0
Democratic Party	124,561	1.17	0
Free Bloc	84,553	0.80	0
People's Democratic Party–Rally for the Republic	79,324	0.75	0
Electoral Union of Interest Groups	54,916	0.52	0
Freedom Party	42,111	0.40	0
Czechoslovakian Democratic Forum	32,543	0.31	0
Movement of Czechoslovakian Understanding	25,672	0.24	0
Civil Liberties Movement	22,124	0.21	0
Rómovia	20,445	0.19	0
Friends of Beer Party	13,869	0.13	0
Total	10,618,280	100.00	150
Valid votes	10,618,280	98.70	
Invalid/blank votes	139,731	1.30	
Total votes	10,758,011	100.00	
Registered voters/turnout	11,178,780	96.24	
Source: Nohlen & Stöver
