= Change from Below =

Slovak political party

Change from Below, Democratic Union of Slovakia Zmena zdola, Demokratická únia Slovenska
- Abbreviation: Zmena zdola, DÚ
- Leader: Ján Budaj
- Founded: 7 September 2000; 25 years ago
- Split from: Democratic Union
- Headquarters: Hybešova 41, Bratislava
- Membership (2021): ▲51
- Ideology: Liberal conservatism
- Political position: Centre-right
- National affiliation: Democrats; Until 2022: Civic Democratic Platform, OĽaNO
- International affiliation: Liberal International (until 2004)
- Colours: Yellow and blue
- National Council: 0 / 150
- European Parliament: 0 / 15

Website
- zmenazdola.sk

Change from Below, Democratic Union of Slovakia (sometimes translated as Change from the Bottom or Change from the Bottom Up; Slovak: Zmena zdola, Demokratická únia Slovenska, ZZ, DÚ), in the years 2000—2002 Liberal Democratic Union (abbreviation LDÚ), and 2002—2010 Democratic Union of Slovakia (abbreviation DÚ), is a non-parliamentary political party in Slovakia since 2000. Its chairman Ján Budaj is a member of the National Council of the Slovak Republic elected on the OĽaNO party's list of candidates.

== Party leadership ==
- Ján Budaj – chairman

== Key members of the party ==
- Juraj Smatana – teacher, popular blogger and civic activist. Member of the Regional Office of the Trenčín Region elected as the Považská Bystrica District.

== History ==
The Democratic Union of Slovakia was founded by a group of members of the Democratic Union, dissatisfied with the merger of the Democratic Union into the Slovak Democratic and Christian Union. The group was led by Ján Budaj, who was elected chairman of the party on the founding republican committee on November 4, 2000. The party was registered with the Ministry of the Interior on September 7, 2000, under the original name of the Liberal Democratic Union. In 2002, the party was renamed to a name almost identical to the name of the defunct party "Democratic Union" (see Democratic Union of Slovakia (1994) / DEÚS and Democratic Union / DÚ).

== Election results ==
- 2002 parliamentary election - the party ran for election in coalition with the Democratic Party. Just before the elections, however, the Democratic Party withdrew the candidate with a recommendation for its supporters to elect the Slovak Democratic and Christian Union, and thus the Democratic Union of Slovakia dropped out of the election competition without its own intervention.
- 2004 European Parliament election - the party achieved an electoral gain of 0.19% of the vote and did not get into the European Parliament.
- 2002 parliamentary election - party politicians took part in the elections for the candidate of the Free Forum, which did not get into parliament.
- 2012 parliamentary election - the party achieved an electoral gain of 1.29% and did not get into the National Counci.
- 2016 parliamentary election - the party as an independent subject did not run for parliamentary elections, but after an agreement with the Ordinary People and Independent Personalities movement.

Election	Leader	Votes	%	Rank	Seats	+/–	Status
2020	Igor Matovič (Note: Igor Matovič (OĽaNO) served as leader and Ján Budaj served as ZZ's chairman.)	721,166	25.02%	1st	1 / 150		OĽaNO–SR–SaS–ZĽ
2020	As a part of the OĽaNO–KÚ–NOVA–ZZ list, which won 53 seats in total.						

== Voting preferences ==
As the party has not run for the National Council of the Slovak Republic independently since 2012, the Statistical Office of the Slovak Republic does not record its preferences.

=== Chairman ===
- since 2000 Ján Budaj

== See also ==
- Democratic Union of Slovakia
- Democratic Union (Slovakia)
