= Civic Democratic Platform =

Civic Democratic Platform Občiansko-demokratická platforma
- Abbreviation: ODP
- Leader: Ján Budaj
- Founder: Ján Budaj
- Founded: October 2022
- Split from: Ordinary People and Independent Personalities
- Ideology: Liberalism
- Political position: Centre to centre-right
- National Council: 10 / 150

The Civic Democratic Platform (Slovak: Občiansko-demokratická platforma, ODP) is a political group in Slovakia founded in October 2022 as the liberal wing of the ruling OĽaNO party.

== History ==
The Civic Democratic Platform, which is supposed to represent the liberal wing of the OĽaNO movement, was founded around Ján Budaj in October 2022 by ten deputies after the Freedom and Solidarity left the government. It includes Kristián Čekovský, Róbert Halák, Monika Kozelová, Anna Mierna, Anna Remiášová, Jaromír Šíbl, Tomáš Šudík, Jarmila Vaňová and Vladimír Zajacik. The MPs around Budaj were against the agreement on early elections and demanded the departure of Igor Matovič from the government so that the government does not fall.

On 16 December 2022, the platform withdrew from the OĽaNO parliamentary group and later called for cooperation with the Progressive Slovakia and SPOLU. The platform also wants to organize a round table for other democratic forces in January 2023 to agree on cooperation.
