= Ivan Čarnogurský =

Slovak businessman and politician (1933–2022)

Member of the Chamber of People of Czechoslovakia
- In office 6 June 1992 – 31 December 1992

Member of the Slovak National Council
- In office 1990–1992

Personal details
- Born: 27 May 1933 Bratislava, Czechoslovakia
- Died: 9 November 2022 (aged 89) Bratislava, Slovakia
- Party: KDH
- Education: Slovak University of Technology in Bratislava; University of Economics in Bratislava
- Occupation: Businessman

Ivan Čarnogurský (27 May 1933 – 9 November 2022) was a Slovak businessman and politician. A member of the Christian Democratic Movement, he served in the Chamber of People from June to December 1992.

He was the brother of the first prime minister of Slovakia Ján Čarnogurský.

Čarnogurský died in Bratislava on 9 November 2022, at the age of 89.

== Biography ==
He grew up with his grandmother in Vajnory and after the outbreak of the Second World War in Mala Frankova in Zamagurie. He studied mechanical engineering at the Slovak University of Technology in Bratislava and management at the University of Economics in Bratislava. From 1958 to 1989 he worked as an engineer in various positions, successively in senior positions. From 1969 to 1970 he managed the construction of the airport in Nasseria, Iraq, and participated in the design and construction of the Gabčíkovo hydroelectric power station.
