= Chmiňany =

- Municipality
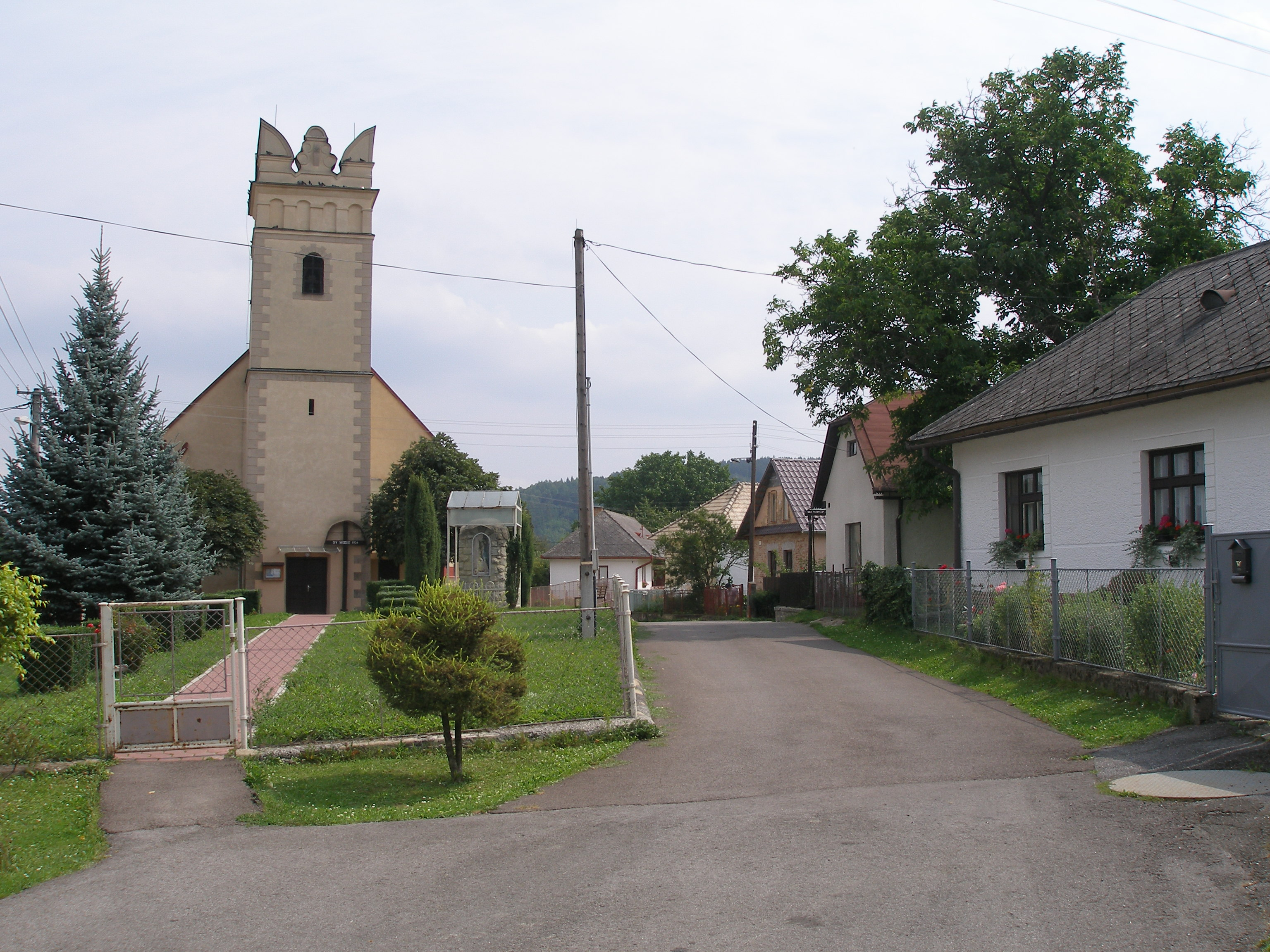

- Flag

- Location of Chmiňany in the Prešov Region Location of Chmiňany in Slovakia
- Coordinates: 49.00°N 21.07°E
- Country: Slovakia
- Region: Prešov Region
- District: Prešov District
- First mentioned: 1330

Government
  - Mayor: Katarína Tomaščínová (KDH)

Area
  - Total: 7.49 km^{2} (2.89 sq mi)
- Elevation: 379 m (1,243 ft)

Population (2025)
  - Total: 1,089
- Time zone: UTC+1 (CET)
  - Summer (DST): UTC+2 (CEST)
- Postal code: 823 3
- Area code: +421 51
- Vehicle registration plate (until 2022): PO
- Website: www.obec-chminany.sk

Chmiňany (Hungarian: Monyhád) is a village and municipality in Prešov District in the Prešov Region of eastern Slovakia.

== History ==
In historical records the village was first mentioned in 1330.

== Geography ==
The municipality lies at an altitude of 379 metres (1,243 ft) and covers an area of 7.49 km^{2} (2.89 sq mi) (2025).

== Population ==
Population statistic (10 years)
| Year | 1995 | 2005 | 2015 | 2025 |
|---|---|---|---|---|
| Count | 627 | 783 | 928 | 1089 |
| Difference | | +24.88% | +18.51% | +17.34% |

Population statistic
| Year | 2024 | 2025 |
|---|---|---|
| Count | 1069 | 1089 |
| Difference | | +1.87% |

It has a population of 1089 people (31 December 2025).

=== Ethnicity ===
Census 2021 (1+ %)
| Ethnicity | Number | Fraction |
|---|---|---|
| Slovak | 946 | 94.31% |
| Romani | 51 | 5.08% |
| Not found out | 30 | 2.99% |
| Total | 1003 | |

In year 2021 was 1003 people by ethnicity 946 as Slovak, 51 as Romani, 30 as Not found out, 6 as Hungarian and 1 as Czech.

Note on population: The difference values of population numbers in the table "Population statistic" and in the sections "Ethnicity" & "Religion" is caused by the use of various statistical methods.

=== Religion ===
Census 2021 (1+ %)
| Religion | Number | Fraction |
|---|---|---|
| Roman Catholic Church | 780 | 77.77% |
| None | 97 | 9.67% |
| Evangelical Church | 57 | 5.68% |
| Not found out | 24 | 2.39% |
| Greek Catholic Church | 23 | 2.29% |
| Total | 1003 | |

In year 2021 was 1003 people by religion 780 from Roman Catholic Church, 97 from None, 57 from Evangelical Church, 24 from Not found out, 23 from Greek Catholic Church, 9 from Jehovah's Witnesses, 3 from Old Catholic Church, 3 from Apostolic Church, 2 from Christian Congregations in Slovakia, 1 from Church of the Brethren, 1 from Seventh-day Adventist Church, 1 from Buddhism, 1 from Baptists Church and 1 from Ad hoc movements.

== Genealogical resources ==
The records for genealogical research are available at the state archive "Statny Archiv in Presov, Slovakia"

- Roman Catholic church records (births/marriages/deaths): 1792–1895 (parish B)
- Greek Catholic church records (births/marriages/deaths): 1825–1898 (parish B)
- Lutheran church records (births/marriages/deaths): 1753–1895 (parish B)

== See also ==
- List of municipalities and towns in Slovakia
