= 1990 Slovak parliamentary election =

← 1986	8–9 June 1990	1992 →

All 150 seats in the Slovak National Council 76 seats needed for a majority
- Turnout: 95.39% (▼4.37 pp)
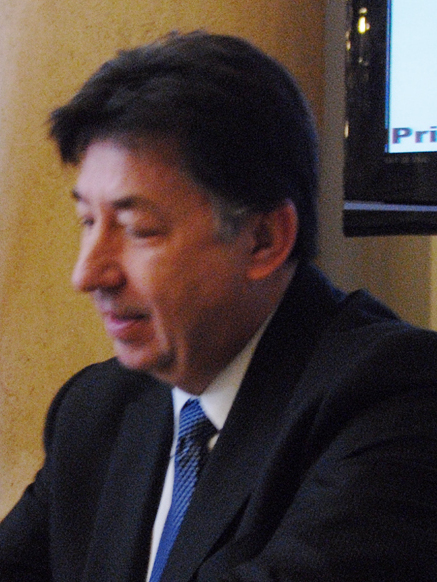

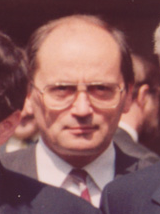

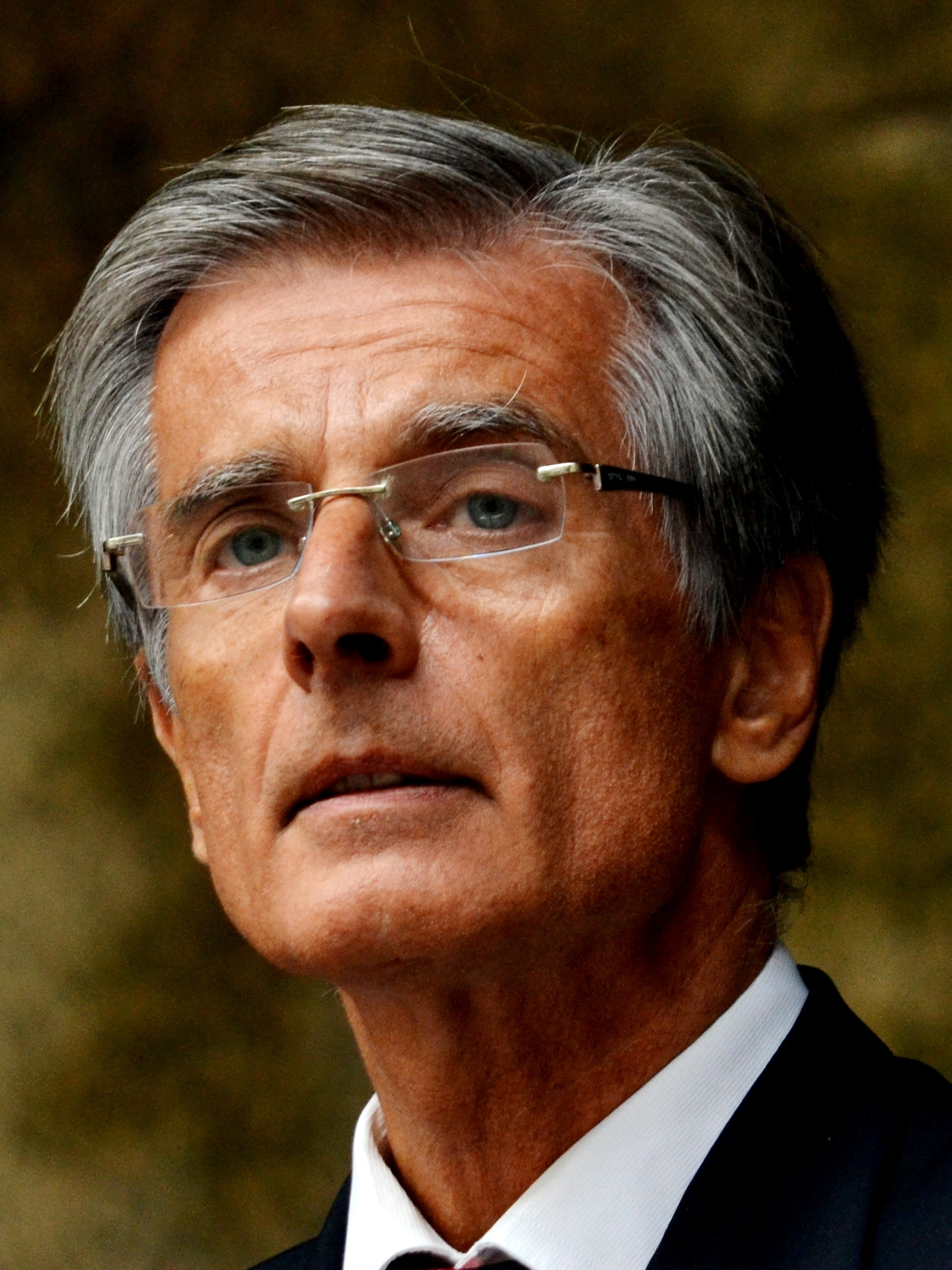

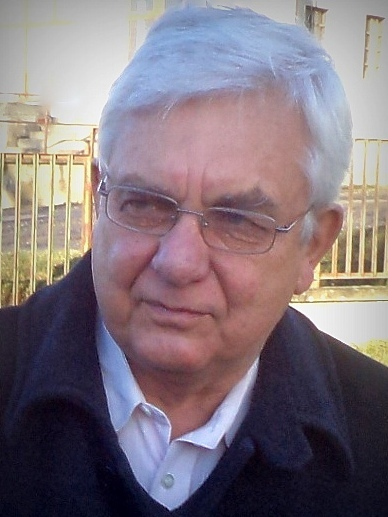

	First party	Second party	Third party
Leader	Ján Budaj	Ján Čarnogurský	Víťazoslav Móric
Party	VPN	KDH	SNS
Seats won	48	31	22
Popular vote	991,285	648,782	470,984
Percentage	29.4%	19.2%	13.9%
	Fourth party	Fifth party	Sixth party
Leader	Peter Weiss	Miklós Duray	Ján Holčík
Party	KSS	COEX	DS
Alliance		EGY–MKDM/MKDH
Last election	103
Seats won	22	14	7
Seat change	▼81	New	7
Popular vote	450,855	292,636	148,567
Percentage	13.4%	8.7%	4.4%
	Seventh party
Leader	Juraj Mesík
Party	SZ
Seats won	6
Popular vote	117,871
Percentage	3.5%
Prime Minister before election
Milan Čič
VPN
Elected Prime Minister
Vladimír Mečiar
VPN

Parliamentary elections were held in Slovakia on 8 and 9 June 1990 alongside federal elections. They were the first elections after the Velvet Revolution, and the first free elections since 1946. The Public Against Violence (VPN) party emerged as the largest in the Slovak National Council, winning 48 of the 150 seats. In the aftermath of the election, Vladimír Mečiar of the VPN formed a grand coalition with the Christian Democratic Movement (KDH). After a conflict leading to the dissolution of the VPN, the first Mečiar cabinet was brought down by a vote of non-confidence in the parliament. Ján Čarnogurský of the KDH became the new prime minister in April 1991.

== Electoral system ==
These were the only elections with a 3% electoral threshold; it was raised to 5% for the 1992 elections.

== Participating parties ==
Party	Ideology	Political position	Leader
Public Against Violence (VPN)	Liberalism; Liberal democracy	Big tent	Ján Budaj
Christian Democratic Movement (KDH)	Christian democracy Social conservatism	Centre-right	Ján Čarnogurský
Slovak National Party (SNS)	Slovak nationalism Right-wing populism	Far-right	Víťazoslav Móric
Communist Party of Slovakia (KSS)	Communism; Democratic socialism	Left-wing	Peter Weiss
Coexistence–Hungarian Christian Democratic Movement (EGY–MKDM/MKDH)	Hungarian minority interests Christian democracy	Centre	Miklós Duray
Democratic Party (DS)	Conservatism; Economic liberalism	Centre-right	Ján Holčík
Green Party (SZ)	Green politics Green liberalism	Centre	Juraj Mesík

== Results ==
Party	Votes	%	Seats	+/–
Public Against Violence	991,285	29.35	48	New
Christian Democratic Movement	648,782	19.21	31	New
Slovak National Party	470,984	13.94	22	New
Communist Party of Slovakia	450,855	13.35	22	–81
Coexistence–Hungarian Christian Democratic Movement	292,636	8.66	14	New
Democratic Party	148,567	4.40	7	New
Green Party	117,871	3.49	6	New
Alliance of Farmers and the Countryside	85,060	2.52	0	New
Social Democracy	61,401	1.82	0	New
Freedom Party	60,041	1.78	0	–7
Romas	24,797	0.73	0	New
Movement of Czechoslovak Understanding	13,417	0.40	0	New
People's Democratic Party–Rally for the Republic	7,023	0.21	0	New
Free Bloc	3,326	0.10	0	New
Czechoslovak Socialist Party	1,166	0.03	0	0
Czechoslovak Democratic Forum	515	0.02	0	New
Total	3,377,726	100.00	150	0
Valid votes	3,377,726	97.74		
Invalid/blank votes	77,925	2.26		
Total votes	3,455,651	100.00		
Registered voters/turnout	3,622,650	95.39		
Source: Statistics.sk
