= 1990 Czech National Council election =

- 8–9 June 1990

All 200 seats in the Czech National Council 101 seats needed for a majority
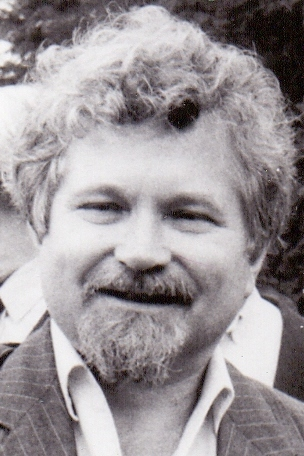

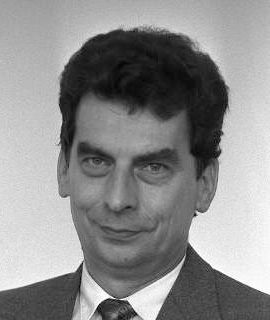

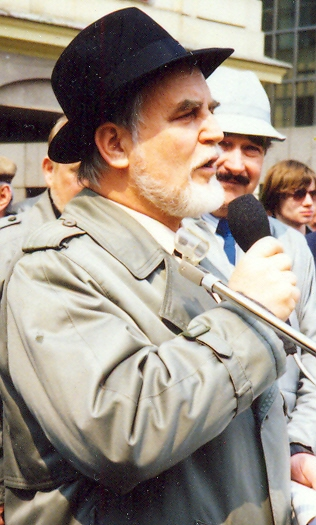

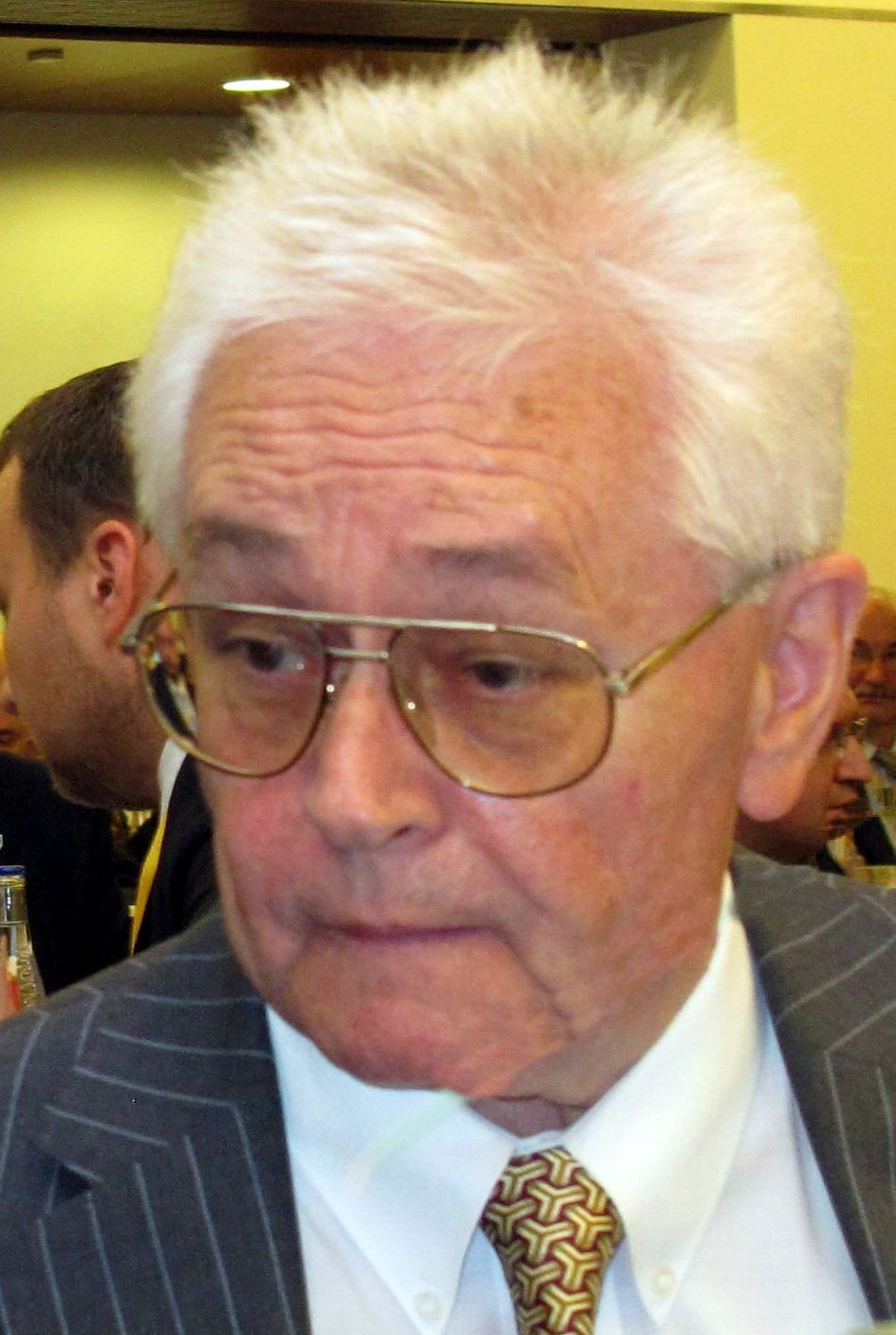
	First party	Second party
Leader	Petr Pithart	Jiří Machalík
Party	OF	KSČ
Last election	Did not exist	137
Seats won	124	33
Seat change	New	▼104
Popular vote	3,569,201	954,690
Percentage	49.50%	13.24%
	Third party	Fourth party
Leader	Boleslav Bárta	Josef Bartončík
Party	HSD–SMS	ČSL
Alliance		KDU
Last election	Did not exist	14
Seats won	23	20
Seat change	New	▲6
Popular vote	723,609	607,134
Percentage	10.03%	8.42%
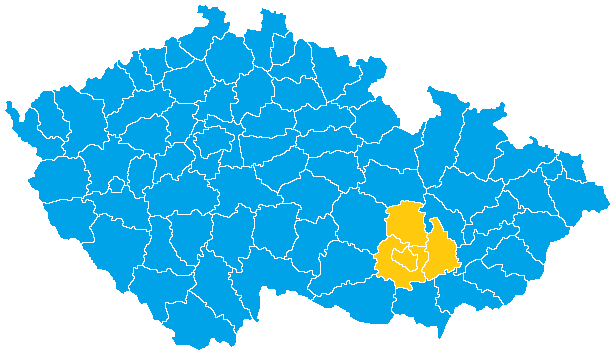
- Most voted-for party by district OF HSD–SMS
Prime Minister before election
Petr Pithart
OF
Prime Minister after election
Petr Pithart
OF

Parliamentary elections were held in the Czech Republic on 8 and 9 June 1990 alongside federal elections. They were the first elections after the Velvet Revolution and voter turnout was 97%.

Following the elections, a coalition government was formed by Civic Forum, the Movement for Autonomous Democracy–Party for Moravia and Silesia and Christian and Democratic Union with Petr Pithart as Prime Minister.

== Opinion polls ==
=== Graphical summary ===
Date	Polling Firm	OF	KSČ	SZ	KDU	ČSSD	ČSS	HSD-SMS	ZEM	SPR	Others	Undecided
2/1990	IVVM	23.3	13.2	—N/a	—N/a	—N/a	—N/a	—N/a	—N/a	—N/a	42.4	—N/a
3/1990	IVVM	19.2	12.7	11.6	18.4	—N/a	—N/a	—N/a	—N/a	—N/a	21.1	16.9
4/1990	IVVM	32.8	18.8	16.2	13.6	7.0	7.0	0.2	4.6	—N/a	0.2	—N/a
5/1990	IVVM	46.7	14.3	5.7	9.7	5.3	3.4	5.5	1.1	1.9	—N/a	—N/a
Source: Nesstar

== Results ==
Party	Votes	%	Seats
Civic Forum	3,569,201	49.50	124
Communist Party of Czechoslovakia	954,690	13.24	33
Movement for Autonomous Democracy–Party for Moravia and Silesia	723,609	10.03	23
Christian and Democratic Union	607,134	8.42	20
Alliance of Farmers and the Countryside	296,547	4.11	0
Czechoslovak Social Democracy	296,165	4.11	0
Green Party	295,844	4.10	0
Czechoslovak Socialist Party	192,922	2.68	0
Free Bloc	75,242	1.04	0
People's Democratic Party–Rally for the Republic	72,048	1.00	0
Electoral Union of Interest Groups	60,354	0.84	0
Friends of Beer Party	43,632	0.61	0
Czechoslovak Democratic Forum	23,659	0.33	0
Total	7,211,047	100.00	200
Valid votes	7,211,047	98.73	
Invalid/blank votes	92,573	1.27	
Total votes	7,303,620	100.00	
Registered voters/turnout	7,553,477	96.69	
Source: Volby (votes)
