= Miklós Duray =

Slovak politician (1945–2022)

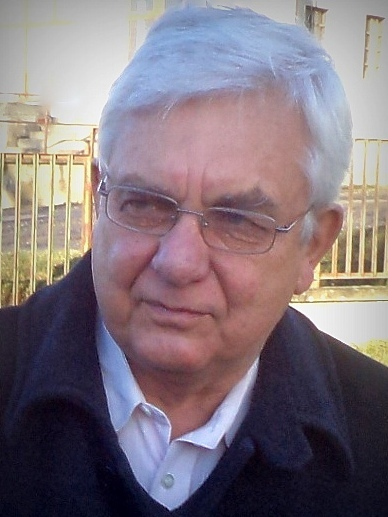

Member of the National Council
- In office 30 September 1994 – 8 July 2010

Personal details
- Born: 18 July 1945 Lučenec, Czechoslovakia
- Died: 30 December 2022 (aged 77) Lučenec, Slovakia
- Party: Hungarian Coalition Party
- Spouse: Zsuzsanna Szabó
- Children: 1
- Education: Comenius University

Miklós Duray (18 July 1945 – 30 December 2022) was an ethnic Hungarian politician active in Slovakia. He served as a Member of the National Council from 1994 to 2010. Previously he was a member of the Czechoslovak Federal Assembly from 1990 to 1994.

== Life before politics ==
Duray was born in Lučenec, but grew up in Fiľakovo. In 1963 he enrolled to study Geology at the Comenius University but his studies were interrupted by the Warsaw Pact invasion of Czechoslovakia in 1968. He eventually graduated in 1971. Following his graduation, he worked as a Researcher at the Slovak Academy of Sciences and an engineering geologist in the Doprastav company, focusing on bridge construction.

Already as a student, Duray was active in activism for the rights of Hungarian minority in Slovakia as well as human rights in general. In these activities, he cooperated with his fellow future MP László Nagy, with whom Duray co-founded the Committee for the Defense of Rights of Hungarians in Czechoslovakia. Duray signed the Charter 77 and was arrested twice by the Communist regime – in 1983 and in 1985. Right after the Velvet Revolution, he and Nagy co-founded the Hungarian Civic Party.

== Political career ==
In 1990 the Hungarian Civic Party ran on the umbrella anti-communist Public Against Violence ticket and Duray gained a seat in the Federal Assembly. In the 1992 election, the party received only about 2% of the vote and did not pass the representation threshold. To ensure the failure to meet the threshold, the Hungarian parties ran together on a ticket called the Hungarian Coalition. The electoral coalition received over 10% of vote and Duray became MP again, this time in the Slovak National Council.

In response to the efforts by the authoritarian government of Vladimír Mečiar's efforts to prevent electoral coalitions from competing in elections, the Hungarian Coalition transformed into a party called Hungarian Coalition Party. Duray remained an MP during the entire time the party was represented in the parliament. In 2010, with more liberal part leaving to form the Most–Híd party and more conservative part, including Duray, eventually rebranded itself as the Party of the Hungarian community, but failed to pass the electoral threshold.

== Controversy ==
Duray was associated with the hard-line of Hungarian ethnic politics. He was very close to the Fidesz party and its leader Viktor Orbán, whom he personally supported by giving a speech at a 2002 Fidesz election rally saying "Felvídek is with you, Felvídek supports you, Viktor". Felvídek is a name for the territory largely equal to the territory of the contemporary Slovakia used during the time when then land was a part of the Kingdom of Hungary. Duray statements were, therefore, interpreted by the Slovak media as a support for restoration of Hungarian sovereignty over Slovakia.

Duray was also notable for his conflicts with the Slovak National Party and in particular its leader Ján Slota, both of whom Duray considered Anti-Hungarian. In 2006 he called the Slovak National Party fascist in a radio interview, for which he was ordered apologize by a Bratislava district court. Duray issued the requested apology in Hungarian.

In 2006 and 2008 Duray refused to be subjected to a Breathalyzer test after breaking traffic regulations and causing a traffic accident, arguing it is his as an MP, which at the time had immunity from criminal prosecution, had a right to refuse the test. The refusal was widely criticized, including by members of Duray's own party.

== Personal life and death ==
Duray was married to the mathematician Zsuzsanna Szabó, who died in 2018. They had one son together. Duray was Roman Catholic.

Duray died on 30 December 2022, at the age of 77. He was buried on 17 January 2023 in Lučenec. The funeral was ecumenical – led by a Roman Catholic priest also in presence of Calvinist pastor in Lučenec Synagogue. The funeral participants included Viktor Orbán and László Kövér representing Hungary as well as the Speaker of the National Council Boris Kollár, Deputy Speaker Gábor Grendel, former Prime Minister Ján Čarnogurský, presidential candidate Gyula Bárdos as well as other mainly ethnic-Hungarian politicians including Krisztián Forró, György Gyimesi and Pál Csáky. A fierce political rival of Duray, Béla Bugár, did not attend the service. Following the service, the procession moved to a local cemetery, where Duray's remains were interred accompanied to tunes of folk songs, ballads and singing.
