= Coexistence (political party) =

Coexistence Együttélés-Spolužitie-Wspólnota-Soužití
- Abbreviation: COEX, EGY
- Leader: Miklós Duray
- Founded: 1990
- Dissolved: 18 March 1998
- Merged into: Party of the Hungarian Coalition
- Membership (1997): 6,000
- Ideology: Minority politics Hungarian nationalism
- Political position: Centre-left
- International affiliation: Liberal International
- Colours: Green

Coexistence (Slovak: Spolužitie, Hungarian: Együttélés, Polish: Wspólnota, Czech: Soužití) was a political party in Czechoslovakia and Slovakia between 1990 and 1998. Although largely a Hungarian minority party, its membership also included Germans, Poles, Ruthenians and Ukrainians. Their Czech sister party still exists.

== History ==
The party was established in February 1990 by Miklós Duray, and allied with the Hungarian Christian Democratic Movement to take part in the general elections that year. In the elections to the Czechoslovak Federal Assembly the two parties won five seats in the Chamber of the People and seven in the Chamber of the Nations. In the elections to the National Council of Slovakia the alliance won 14 seats.

The parties maintained their alliance for the 1992 elections, maintaining the same number of seats in the Federal Assembly and the Slovak National Council.

In 1994 Coexistence allied with the Hungarian Christian Democratic Movement and the Hungarian Civic Party to form the Hungarian Coalition. In the elections that year the alliance won seventeen seats (nine of which were Coexistence members), making it the third largest party in the National Council. The three parties officially merged into the Party of the Hungarian Coalition on 18 March 1998.
