= Róbert Halák =

Slovak actor and politician

Member of the National Council
- Incumbent
- Assumed office 20 March 2020

Personal details
- Born: 4 September 1977 (age 49) Šaľa, Czechoslovakia (now Slovakia)
- Party: Ordinary People and Independent Personalities

Róbert Halák (born 4 September 1977 in Šaľa) is a Slovak theater and television actor and politician. Since 2020 he has served as a member of the National Council in the Ordinary People and Independent Personalities party caucus.

== Acting career ==
Halák was born in Šala and grew up in the nearby small town of Vlčany. In 1997 he graduated from a conservatory in Bratislava. Already as a student, he was active as an actor at the New Scene theater. In 1997–2020 he played in various theatre and television productions, mainly soap operas. In 2008, Halák received the Literary Fund prize for playing Tony in the West Side Story musical.

== Political career ==
In 2020, he was elected to parliament on the Ordinary People and Independent Personalities list. In October 2022 he caused a disruption in parliamentary activity by destroying the parliament's computer and communication systems. The parliament session was suspected on 27 October as a result of ICT systems failure, which was originally blamed on a hacker attack. Nonetheless, in early October, the speaker, Boris Kollár announced the issue was caused by "incorrectly connected cables". Halák was later revealed as a culprit, although he denied sabotaging the equipment on purpose, stating he does not even own a computer and connected the cables only as a spontaneous reaction to seeing loose cables in a meeting room in the parliament building.
