= Christian and Democratic Union =

Christian and Democratic Union Křesťanská a demokratická unie
- Abbreviation: KDU
- Leader: Josef Bartončík
- Founded: 1990
- Dissolved: 1992
- Succeeded by: KDU–ČSL
- Ideology: Christian democracy
- Member parties: Czechoslovak People's Party; Christian Democratic Party; Free Peasant Party; Association of Czechoslovak Entrepreneurs; Moravian Civic Movement; Club of Pensioners

The Christian and Democratic Union was a political alliance in Czechoslovakia.

== History ==
The alliance was formed prior to the 1990 elections by the Czechoslovak People's Party, the Christian Democratic Party, the Free Peasant Party, the Association of Czechoslovak Entrepreneurs, the Moravian Civic Movement and the Club of Pensioners.

In the elections to the Czechoslovak Federal Assembly it won nine seats in the Chamber of the People and six in the Chamber of the Nations. In the elections to the National Council of the Czech Republic the party won 20 seats.

The alliance was dissolved before the 1992 elections; the Christian Democratic Party ran in an alliance with the Civic Democratic Party and the other parties ran alone. The Czechoslovak People's Party itself renamed as the Christian and Democratic Union – Czechoslovak People's Party.
