= Jan Urban (journalist) =

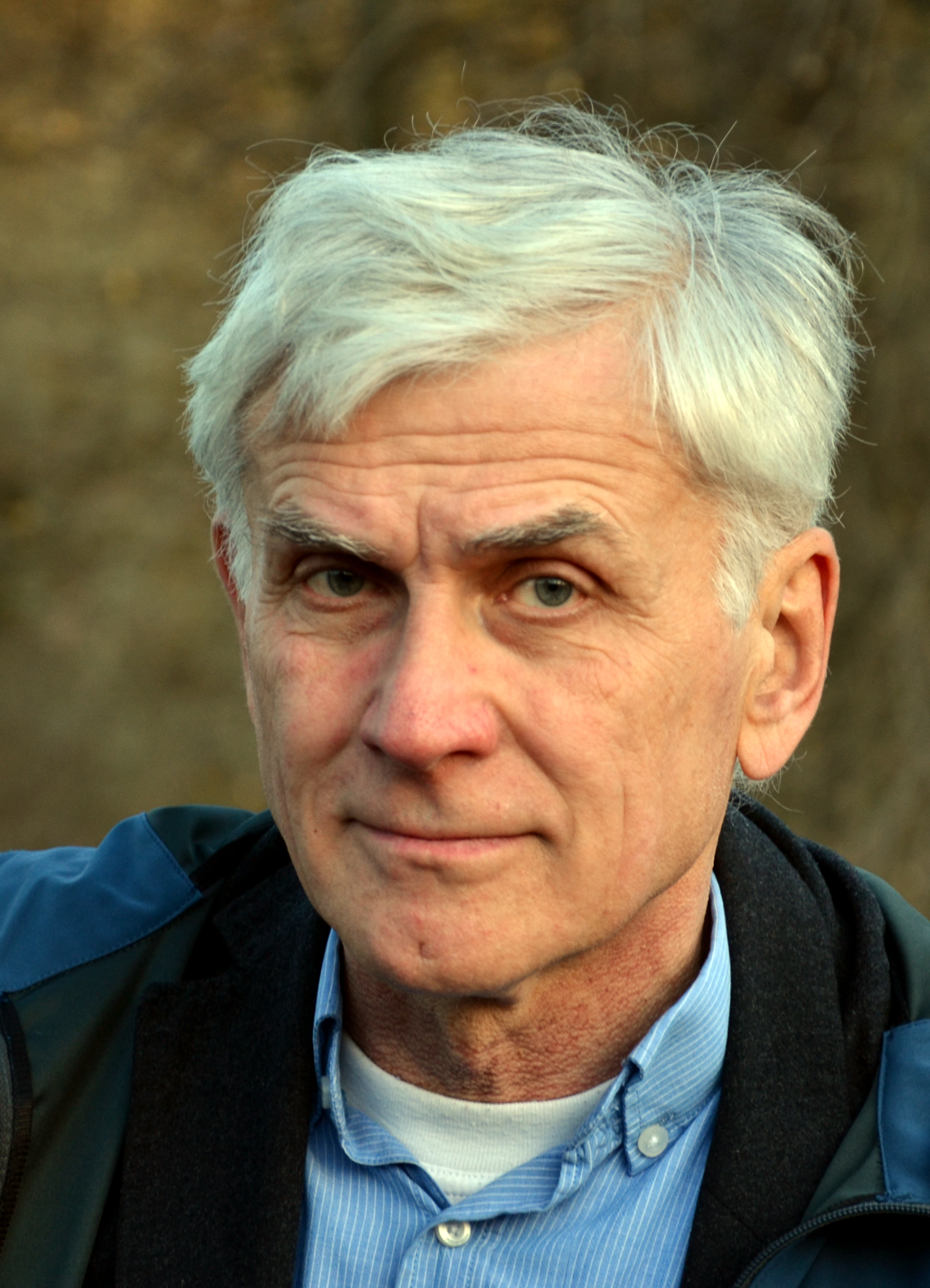
- Born: 27 March 1951 (age 75); Hradec Králové, Czechoslovakia
- Education: Charles University
- Occupations: Journalist; lecturer; politician
- Political party: Civic Forum (1989–1990)

Jan Urban (born 27 March 1951) is a Czech journalist, lecturer and former politician. He is known for leading the Civic Forum movement to victory in 1990 Czechoslovak parliamentary election, the first free elections in Czechoslovakia in 44 years.

== Life and career ==
Urban was born on 27 March 1951 in Hradec Králové, Czechoslovakia. He graduated from Charles University in 1974 with a degree in philosophy and history. He worked as a high school teacher until being removed due to refusing to sign a collective statement condemning Charter 77. He subsequently worked as a horse trainer and bricklayer, as well as a journalist with Radio Free Europe, and founded the underground East European Information Agency.

Urban participated in the 17 November 1989 demonstrations that began the Velvet Revolution, and subsequently helped start the students' and theater workers' strikes. He was a cofounder of Civic Forum, a movement which sought to overthrow the ruling Communist Party of Czechoslovakia, and worked closely with future president Václav Havel. Urban led Civic Forum in the 1990 Czechoslovak parliamentary election, which Civic Forum won with a large margin. He declined to become prime minister and resigned from politics the same year.

Afterwards, Urban continued to work as a journalist and lecturer. He is the author of three books and a play, and also shot a documentary.
