= Hungarian Christian Democratic Movement =

Hungarian Christian Democratic Movement Magyar Kereszténydemokrata Mozgalom Maďarské kresťanskodemokratické hnutie
- Abbreviation: MKDM/MKDH, MKH/MKM
- Leader: Béla Bugár
- Founded: 1990
- Dissolved: 18 March 1998
- Merged into: Party of the Hungarian Coalition
- Membership (1997): 30,000
- Ideology: Hungarian minority interests Christian democracy Conservatism
- Political position: Centre-right
- European affiliation: European People's Party (observer)

The Hungarian Christian Democratic Movement (Hungarian: Magyar Kereszténydemokrata Mozgalom, Slovak: Maďarské kresťanskodemokratické hnutie, MKDM) was a political party in Czechoslovakia and Slovakia between 1990 and 1998. The party was led by Béla Bugár.

== History ==
The party was established in 1990 and allied with Coexistence to take part in the general elections that year. In the elections to the Czechoslovak Federal Assembly the alliance won five seats in the Chamber of the People and seven in the Chamber of the Nations. In the elections to the National Council of Slovakia the alliance won 14 seats.

The parties maintained their alliance for the 1992 elections, maintaining the same number of seats in the Federal Assembly and the Slovak National Council.

In 1994 the party allied with Coexistence and the Hungarian Civic Party to form the Hungarian Coalition. In the elections that year the coalition won seventeen seats (seven of which were MKDM members), making it the third largest party in the National Council. The three parties officially merged into the Party of the Hungarian Coalition on 18 March 1998.
