= Ján Budaj =

Slovak politician

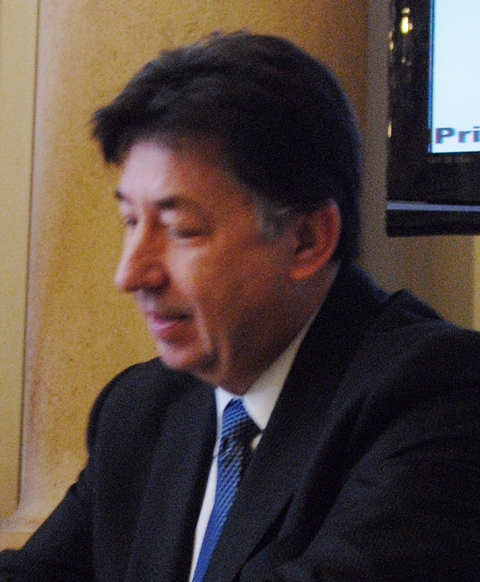
- Budaj in 2010

Minister of the Environment
- In office 21 March 2020 – 15 May 2023
- Prime Minister: Igor Matovič Eduard Heger
- Preceded by: Árpád Érsek
- Succeeded by: Milan Chrenko

Personal details
- Born: February 10, 1952 (age 74) Bratislava, Czechoslovakia
- Party: VPN (1989–1991) DEÚS (1994–1995) DÚ (1995–2000) Change from Below (2000–present)
- Other political affiliations: SDK (1998–2002) OĽaNO (2016–2022) Democrats (2023–present)

Ján Budaj (born 10 February 1952) is a Slovak politician and environmental activist. He is mostly known by his participation in the Velvet Revolution. He served as the Minister of Environment from 21 March 2020, in the cabinets of Igor Matovič and Eduard Heger until the dissolution of the Heger Cabinet on 15 May 2023.

At the end of the 1970s, he founded the Temporary Society of Intensive Experience (DISP) with one of the first signatories of Charter 77 in Slovakia, Tomáš Petřivý, and the poet Vladimír Archleb. Within the framework of DISP, they created various events in the streets of Bratislava: happenings, unauthorized musical events, unofficial exhibitions, etc. In the 1980s, he worked as an ecological and civic activist, and was the compiler of the samizdat publication Bratislava/voice, published in 1987.
