= Ján Čarnogurský =

Slovak politician (born 1944)

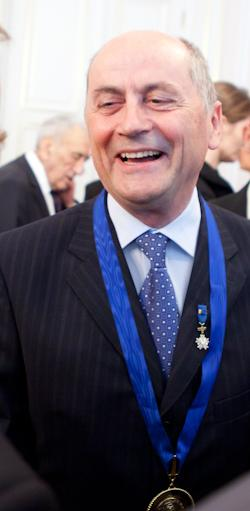
- Čarnogurský in 2011

4th Minister of Justice of Slovakia
- In office 30 October 1998 – 15 October 2002
- Preceded by: Jozef Liščák
- Succeeded by: Daniel Lipšic

Prime Minister of Slovakia
- In office 6 May 1991 – 24 June 1992
- Preceded by: Vladimír Mečiar
- Succeeded by: Vladimír Mečiar

Acting interior minister of Slovakia
- In office 2 November 1990 – 22 November 1990

Deputy Prime minister of Slovakia
- In office 27 June 1990 – 23 April 1991

Deputy Prime minister of Czechoslovakia
- In office 10 December 1989 – 27 June 1990

Personal details
- Born: 1 January 1944 (age 82) Bratislava, First Slovak Republic
- Party: Christian Democratic Movement

Ján Čarnogurský (born 1 January 1944) is a Slovak former politician, who served as the Prime Minister of Slovakia (1991–1992), the former chairman of the Christian Democratic Movement (1990–2000), author and columnist. Today he is chairman of Slovak-Russian association with headquarters in Bratislava.

== Before 1989 ==
He studied law at the Charles University in Prague (graduation in 1969) and at the Comenius University in Bratislava (Doctor's degree in 1971). From 1970 to 1981, first he was active as a junior attorney-at-law, then as an attorney-at-law in Bratislava, and was member of a section of the Center of Czech and Slovak attorneys-at-law. In 1981, he was deprived of his attorney-at-law licence by the Communist authorities, because he had defended a person in a political process. However, he continued to provide legal advice to opposition (Charta 77) and religious activists. Between 1982 and 1986 first he was active as a driver, then as a company lawyer. In 1987 he was fired and remained unemployed. He was an important figure in the secret church in Slovakia and, between 1987 and 1989, he published illegally the magazine Bratislavské listy (Bratislava Papers). He represented the Christian Democratic wing within the Anti-Communist opposition in Czechoslovakia.

== 1989–1992 ==
Shortly before the Velvet Revolution, on 14 August 1989, he was imprisoned and released only after the collapse of the Communist regime through a presidential amnesty on 25 November 1989. While there was widespread support for Čarnogurský, it is claimed that some leaders of the Revolution considered him an extremist. From December 1989 to April 1990 he was the first vice-prime minister, since April to June 1990 the vice-prime minister of Czechoslovakia. He was a co-founder and, since February 1990, the chairman of the Christian Democratic Movement of Slovakia. Since the Christian Democratic Movement was Slovakia's second largest party after the 1990 Slovak parliamentary election, Čarnogurský became the vice-prime minister of Slovakia and in June 1990. After the Movement for a Democratic Slovakia split from the Public against Violence, i.e. from the party that had won the 1990 elections, Čarnogurský took over the post of the prime minister of Slovakia in April 1991.

During this period characterized by quarrels between Czechs and Slovaks concerning the future of their co-existence he became famous by his statement that in the future Slovakia should have its own "little [European] star" in Europe, which at the time of existence of Czechoslovakia was a shocking statement.

== 1992–2002 ==
After the 1992 election he ceased to be prime minister and was a deputy to the National Council of the Slovak Republic (Slovak parliament) as an opposition member and strong Mečiar opponent from 1992 to 1998.

After the 1998 election he was the Minister of Justice of Slovakia from 1998 to 2002.

== After 2002 ==
In 2002, he retired from politics altogether and has been working as an attorney-at-law since. Pavol Hrušovský became the new chairman of the Christian Democratic Movement after him.

In 2017, he became the Chairman of the Coordinating Board of the International Association of Friends of Crimea, an informal organization funded by the Russian government.

On 6 November 2024, Čarnogurský received Russian Order of Honour from the Chairman of the State Council of the Republic of Crimea Vladimir Konstantinov. At the same time, Konstantinov awarded him the Order for Loyalty to Duty from the Republic of Crimea.

On 12 September 2026, he attended an event held by the far-right identitarian movement in Vienna, Austria.

== Private life ==
Ján Čarnogurský is the son of a former journalist and politician Pavol Čarnogurský Sr., who was a member of the Assembly of the Slovak Republic (1938–1945). He came from a family of five siblings: former politician Ivan, Pavol Jr., sinologist Marina, and a translator Olga. He married his wife Marta, fathering sons Ján Jr. and Peter. He is the godson of Slovak inter-war politician and journalist Karol Sidor.

== Secondary functions ==
- February 1990 – August 1990: chairman of the Legislative Council of the Czechoslovak government
- 2–22 November 1990: temporary leader of the Ministry of the Interior of Slovakia
- 1990–1991: chairman of the Slovak government Council for Information Policy and Mass media and chairman of the Slovak government Council for Nationalities and Ethnic Groups
- 1993–1994: vice-chairman of the Parliamentary Assembly of the CSCE
- December 1994 – October 1998: member of the Permanent Delegation of the National Council of the Slovak Republic at the Parliamentary Assembly of the CSCE
- 1991–(?)1998: member of the Permanent Delegation of the National Council of the Slovak Republic at the Parliamentary Assembly of the OSCE
- 1997 – ? (1998?/2002?): vice-president of the European Union of Christian Democrats (EUCD)
- 2002 – Member of the Advisory Board of the Global Panel Foundation – a NGO which works behind the scenes in crisis areas around the world. Global Panel has offices and satellites in Berlin, Copenhagen, New York, Prague, Sydney and Toronto.

Other Advisory Board Members include George Robertson (former NATO Secretary General and UK Defense Minister), Barbara McDougall (Former Minister of Foreign Affairs and Finance, Canada) and Stuart Eizenstat (former Deputy Treasury Secretary, Under-Secretary of State and Ambassador under President Bill Clinton) among others.

He is Knight of Honor of the Order of St. George.

== Works ==
- Trpeli za vieru (They suffered for the faith; 1991)
- Videné od Dunaja (Seen from the Danube; 1997): his speeches and articles
- The Fall of Communism in Czechoslovakia

== Honours and awards ==
Issuer	Honour	Medal Ribbon	Date	City
Republic of Crimea	Order for Loyalty to Duty		6 November 2024	Moscow
House of Habsburg-Lorraine	Order of St. George		February 2016	Milan
Russia	Order of Honour		6 November 2024	Moscow

Political offices
Preceded by Vladimír Mečiar	Prime Minister of Slovakia; 1991–1992	Succeeded by Vladimír Mečiar
