= Democratic Union (Slovakia) =

Slovak political party

- Founded: 1995
- Dissolved: 2000
- Merger of: Democratic Union of Slovakia, National-Democratic Party
- Merged into: SDKÚ
- Ideology: Liberalism
- Political position: Centre-right

The Democratic Union (Slovak: Demokratická únia, DÚ) was a liberal party in Slovakia.

== History ==
The party was established on 25 March 1995 by a merger of the Democratic Union of Slovakia and the National Democratic Party, and was led by was Eduard Kukan. In 1998, it joined the Slovak Democratic Coalition, and in 2000, it merged into the Slovak Democratic and Christian Union.
