= People's Party – Movement for a Democratic Slovakia =

People's Party – Movement for a Democratic Slovakia Ľudová strana – Hnutie za demokratické Slovensko
- Leader: Vladimír Mečiar (1991–2013)
- Founder: Vladimír Mečiar
- Founded: 27 April 1991
- Dissolved: 11 January 2014
- Split from: Public Against Violence
- Succeeded by: Party of Democratic Slovakia
- Headquarters: Tomášikova 32/A, Bratislava
- Youth wing: Democratic Youth Forum
- Membership (2013): 4,175
- Ideology: Conservatism; Nationalism; Populism
- Political position: Syncretic
- European affiliation: European Democratic Party (2009–2014)
- European Parliament group: Alliance of Liberals and Democrats for Europe (2009–2014)
- International affiliation: Alliance of Democrats
- Colours: Blue
- Anthem: "Vivat Slovakia"

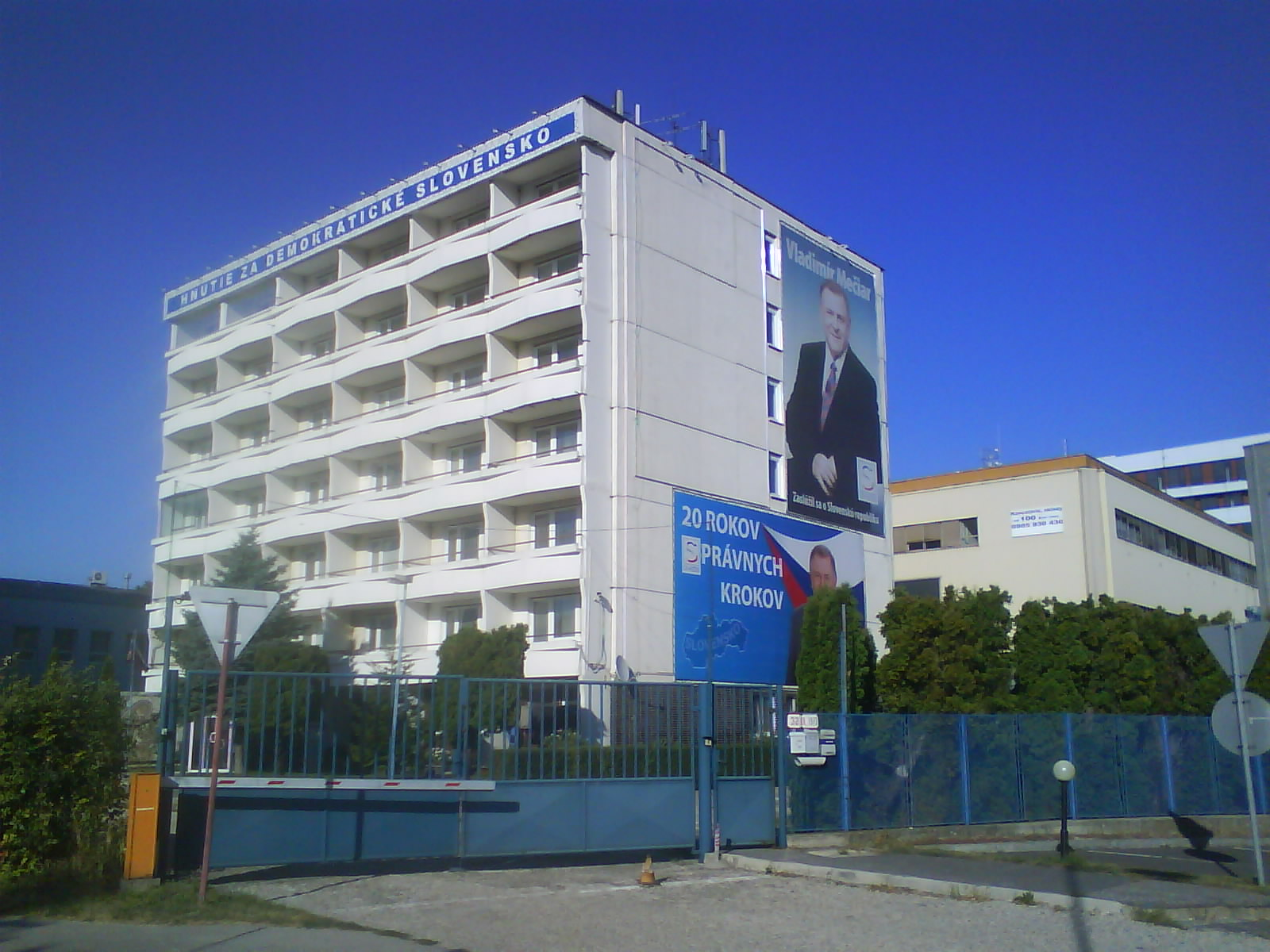
Former headquarters of the ĽS-HZDS political party at Tomášikova Street 32/A in Bratislava

The People's Party – Movement for a Democratic Slovakia (Slovak: Ľudová strana – Hnutie za demokratické Slovensko, ĽS–HZDS), known as the Movement for a Democratic Slovakia (Slovak: Hnutie za demokratické Slovensko, HZDS) until 2003, was a conservative and populist political party in Slovakia. It was founded in 1991 following a split from Public Against Violence and dissolved in 2014. Throughout its existence, the party was led by its founder, Vladimír Mečiar. HZDS was considered a personalistic party built around Mečiar's cult of the leader. At the same time, it was a mass party with over 70,000 members at its peak.

The party dominated Slovak politics from 1992 to 2002 and led two non-consecutive governments between 1992 and 1998. During its time in power, HZDS oversaw the peaceful dissolution of Czechoslovakia and the independent Slovakia state formation period. It also oversaw democratic backsliding, the growing influence of organized crime on the state, and the emergence of a Slovak business oligarchy.

Although uncategorized on the left–right spectrum, HZDS utilized nationalist and statist rhetoric to gain popular support. Its position toward European integration was considered ambiguous, evolving from soft Euroscepticism throughout the 1990s to self-proclaimed pro-Europeanism during the 2000s. On European level it was affiliated within the European Democratic Party and the Alliance of Liberals and Democrats for Europe group from 2009 until 2014. It was also a member of the Alliance of Democrats international.

== History ==
=== Velvet Revolution ===
The party was created as a Slovak nationalist faction of Public Against Violence (VPN), from which it seceded at an extraordinary VPN congress on 27 April 1991. Called 'Movement for a Democratic Slovakia' (HZDS), it was led by Vladimír Mečiar, who had been deposed as Slovak Prime Minister a month earlier, and composed mostly of the VPN's cabinet members. The HZDS claimed to represent Slovak national interest, and demanded a more decentralised Czechoslovak confederation. On 7 May 1992, the HZDS voted for a declaration of independence, but this was defeated 73-57.

At the first election in which it took part, on 5–6 June, the HZDS won an overwhelming victory, with 74 seats on the National Council: two short of an absolute majority. Mečiar was appointed prime minister on 24 June. Whereas the HZDS wanted a confederation, the Czech elections on the same day were won by Civic Democratic Party, which preferred a tighter federation. Recognising that these positions were irreconcilable, the National Council voted for Slovakia's Declaration of Independence by 113 votes to 24, and Mečiar concluded formal negotiations over the dissolution of Czechoslovakia.

=== Dominant party ===
The party adopted an economically populist position, and sought to slow the post-Soviet privatisation and liberalisation.

In the first elections after independence, in late 1994, the HZDS retained its dominant position, winning 58 seats (the Peasant's Party of Slovakia won a further 3 on its list).

=== Decline in opposition ===
Originally designating itself as a centre-left party, the party moved towards the mainstream right and, in March 2000, renamed itself the 'People's Party – Movement for a Democratic Slovakia' (ĽS-HZDS) to try to achieve membership of the European People's Party (EPP). However, lingering memories of former anti-Europeanism, conflicting rhetoric, and the presence of three Slovak parties already in the EPP prevented this. The ĽS-HZDS then looked to the Euro-integrationist European Democratic Party, which it joined in 2009.

The build-up to the 2002 election saw Mečiar exclude a number of prominent members from the party's list of candidates. Several of the excluded members, led by Ivan Gašparovič, split from the party and founded the similarly titled Movement for Democracy (HZD). The new party won 3.3% of the vote, eating significantly into the ĽS-HZDS's position, and contributing to it winning only 36 seats. By 2006, further divisions and splits had reduced it to only 21 MPs.

=== Back in government ===
In the parliamentary election of 17 June 2006, the party won 8.8% of the popular vote and 15 out of 150 seats.

Two ĽS-HZDS ministers were sworn in with the Robert Fico government on July 4, 2006:

- Štefan Harabin (deputy prime minister; minister of justice);
- Miroslav Jureňa (minister of agriculture).

In the 2010 election the party lost all its seats, after its share of the vote halved to below the 5% threshold for entering parliament.

== Election results ==
=== National Council ===
Election	Leader	Votes	%	Rank	Seats	+/–	Status
1992	Vladimír Mečiar	1,148,625	37.3%	1st	74 / 150		ĽS HZDS–SNS (1992–1994)
1992	Vladimír Mečiar	1,148,625	37.3%	1st	74 / 150		Opposition (1994)
1994	Vladimír Mečiar	1,005,488	34.9%	1st	58 / 150	▼16	ĽS HZDS–SNS–ZRS–RSS
1994	Vladimír Mečiar	In coalition with the Peasants' Party of Slovakia, which won 61 seats in total.					
1998	Vladimír Mečiar	907,103	27.0%	1st	43 / 150	▼15	Opposition
2002	Vladimír Mečiar	560,691	19.5%	1st	36 / 150	▼7	Opposition
2006	Vladimír Mečiar	202,540	8.8%	5th	15 / 150	▼21	Smer–SNS–ĽS HZDS
2010	Vladimír Mečiar	109,480	4.3%	8th	0 / 150	▼15	Extra-parliamentary
2012	Vladimír Mečiar	23,772	0.9%	13th	0 / 150	0	Extra-parliamentary

=== European Parliament ===
Year	Vote	Vote %	Seats	Place
2004	119,582	17.04	3 / 14	2nd
2009	74,241 ▼	8.97 ▼	1 / 13	5th ▼

=== Presidential ===
Election year	Candidate	1st round		2nd round	
Election year	Candidate	# of overall votes	% of overall vote	# of overall votes	% of overall vote
1999	Vladimír Mečiar	1,097,956	37.24% (#2)	1,293,642	42.82% (#2)
2004	Vladimír Mečiar	650,242	32.74% (#1)	722,368	40.09% (#2)
2009	Milan Melník	45,985	2.45% (#5)	Supported Ivan Gašparovič	

== See also ==
- Slovak politics
- Privatization in Slovakia
