= Friends of Beer Party =

Former political party in Czechia

Friends of Beer Party Strana přátel piva
- Founded: 1990
- Dissolved: 1998
- Merged into: Czech Social; Democratic Party
- Ideology: Frivolous political party Social democracy
- Political position: Centre-left

Website
- http://www.pratelepiva.cz/sdruzeni/

Friends of Beer Party (Czech: Strana přátel piva, abbreviated SPP) was a political party in the Czech Republic founded on January 16, 1990. Originally intended as a humorous commentary on the large number of new political parties that emerged after the Velvet Revolution in 1989, the party decided to run in the elections after receiving public attention. The party reached its peak in 1992 when it received 1.3%, but still failed to reach the threshold. In 1997 party cooperated with the Free Democrats – Liberal National Social Party (SD–LSNS). The party merged with the Czech Social Democratic Party (ČSSD) in 1998, and former members of the party created a Friends of Beer Club within ČSSD. The SPP now continues its activities as the Friends of Beer Association.
