= 1992 Slovak parliamentary election =

- 5–6 June 1992

All 150 seats in the Slovak National Council 76 seats needed for a majority
- Turnout: 84.17% (▼11.22 pp)
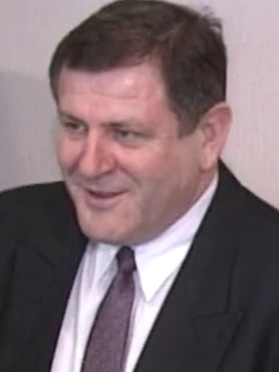

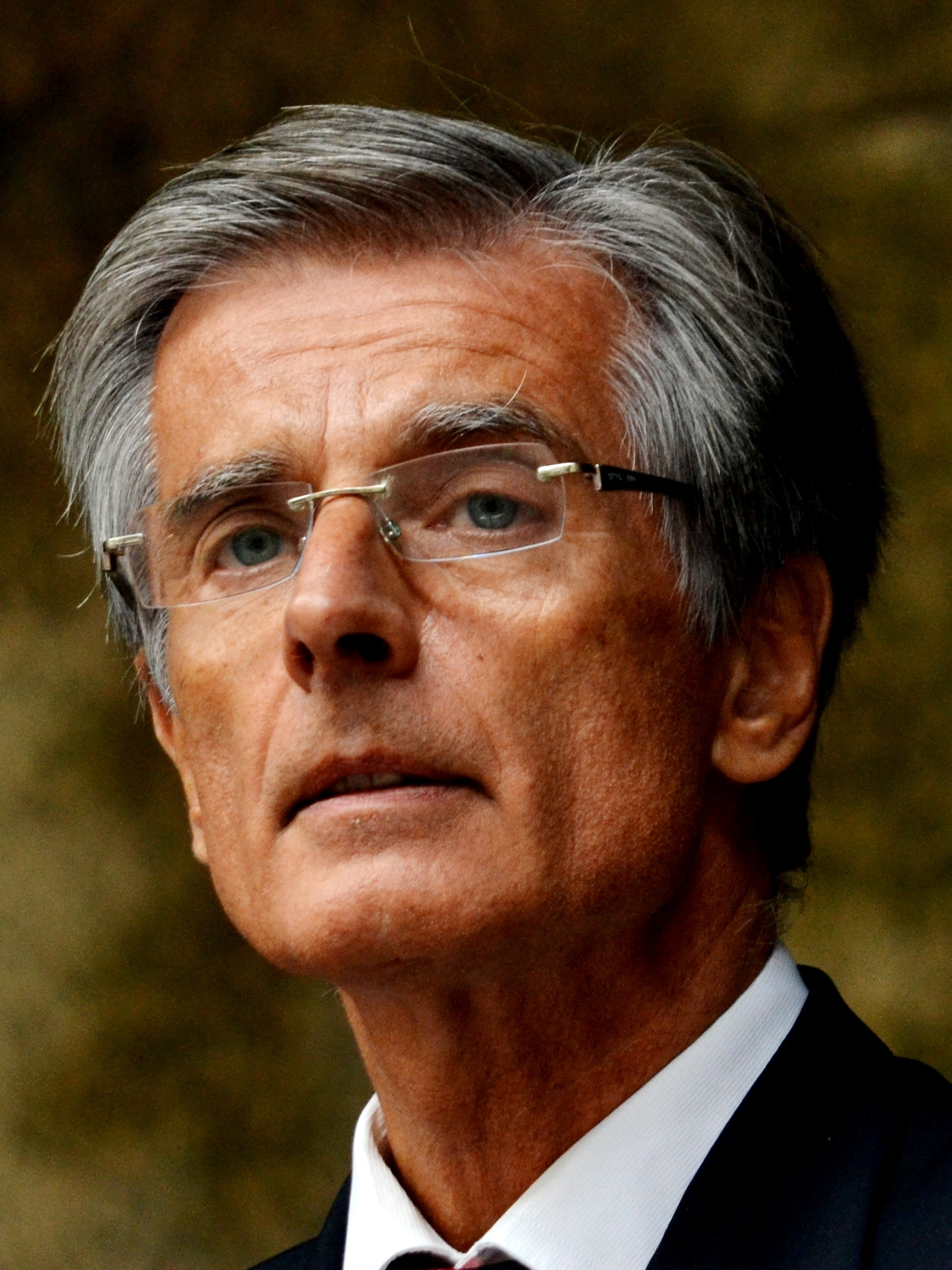

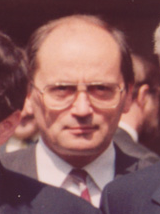

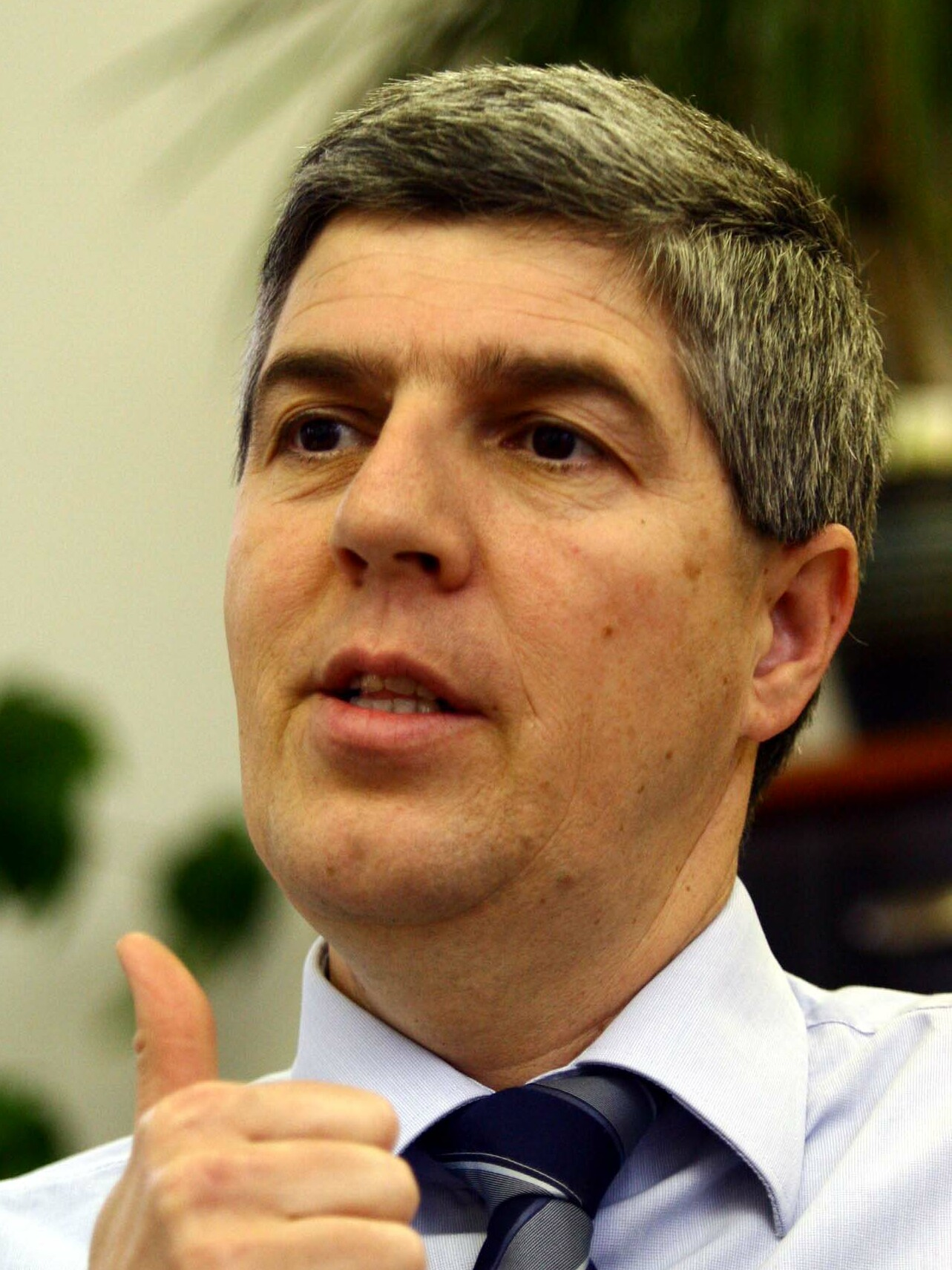
	First party	Second party	Third party
Leader	Vladimír Mečiar	Peter Weiss	Ján Čarnogurský
Party	HZDS	SDĽ	KDH
Last election	Did not exist	22 seats, 13.4%	31 seats, 19.2%
Seats won	74	29	18
Seat change	New	▲7	▼13
Popular vote	1,148,625	453,203	273,945
Percentage	37.3%	14.7%	8.9%
Swing	New	▲1.4 pp	▼10.3 pp
	Fourth party	Fifth party
Leader	Jozef Prokeš	Béla Bugár
Party	SNS	MKDM/MKDH
Alliance		MKDM/MKDH–EGY
Last election	22 seats, 13.9%	14 seats, 8.7%
Seats won	15	14
Seat change	▼7	0
Popular vote	244,527	228,885
Percentage	7.9%	7.4%
Swing	▼6.0 pp	▼1.2 pp
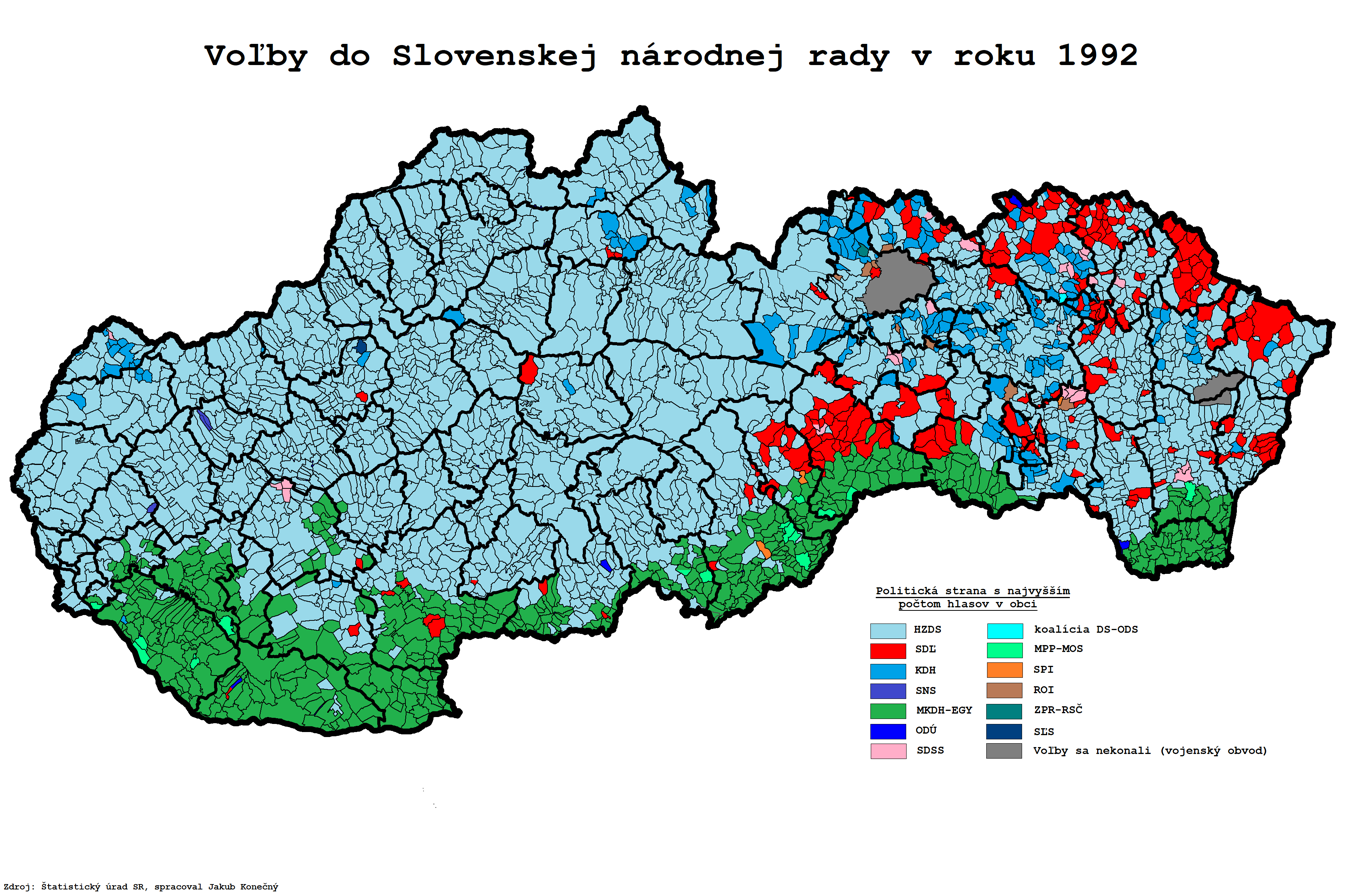
- Results of the election by municipalities
Prime Minister before election
Ján Čarnogurský
KDH
Elected Prime Minister
Vladimír Mečiar
HZDS

Parliamentary elections were held in Slovakia on 5 and 6 June 1992 alongside federal elections. The Movement for a Democratic Slovakia emerged as the largest party, winning 74 of the 150 seats in the National Council and forming a minority government under Vladimír Mečiar. The threshold had been raised from 3% (for the Slovak parliamentary election in 1990) to 5%.

In 1993, the Slovak National Party joined the government led by Prime Minister Mečiar. After a number of MPs left both parties of the ruling coalition, the Mečiar cabinet was brought down by a vote of non-confidence in March 1994. A coalition led by Jozef Moravčík, the former Czechoslovak and Slovak Foreign Minister, led the country to early elections.

== Contesting parties ==
Party	Ideology	Political position	Leader
Movement for a Democratic Slovakia (HZDS)	Conservatism	Syncretic	Vladimír Mečiar
Party of the Democratic Left (SDĽ)	Social democracy	Centre-left	Peter Weiss
Christian Democratic Movement (KDH)	Christian democracy	Centre-right	Ján Čarnogurský
Slovak National Party (SNS)	Ultranationalism	Far-right	Jozef Prokeš
Coexistence–Hungarian Christian Democratic Movement (EGY–MKDM/MKDH)	Hungarian minority interests	Centre-right	Béla Bugár

== Results ==
Party	Votes	%	+/–	Seats	+/–
Movement for a Democratic Slovakia	1,148,625	37.26	New	74	New
Party of the Democratic Left	453,203	14.70	+1.35	29	+7
Christian Democratic Movement	273,945	8.89	–10.32	18	–13
Slovak National Party	244,527	7.93	–6.01	15	–7
Hungarian Christian Democratic Movement–Coexistence	228,885	7.42	–1.24	14	0
Civic Democratic Union	124,503	4.04	New	0	New
Social Democratic Party of Slovakia	123,426	4.00	New	0	New
Democratic Party–Civic Democratic Party	102,058	3.31	–1.09	0	–7
Slovak Christian Democratic Movement	94,162	3.05	New	0	New
Hungarian Civic Party	70,689	2.29	New	0	New
Party of Greens in Slovakia	66,010	2.14	–1.35	0	–6
Party of Greens	33,372	1.08	New	0	New
Party of Labour and Security	29,818	0.97	New	0	New
Communist Party of Slovakia – 91	23,349	0.76	New	0	New
Roma Civic Initiative	18,343	0.60	New	0	New
Rally for the Republic – Republican Party of Czechoslovakia	10,069	0.33	+0.12	0	0
Slovak Party of Freedom–Party of National Unification	9,414	0.31	New	0	New
Slovak People's Party	9,129	0.30	New	0	New
Movement for Civil Freedom	7,169	0.23	New	0	New
Movement for Autonomous Democracy–Party for Moravia and Silesia	3,986	0.13	New	0	New
Movement for Social Justice	3,411	0.11	New	0	New
National Liberals	2,500	0.08	New	0	New
Movement for Freedom of Speech–Slovak Republican Union	2,103	0.07	New	0	New
Total	3,082,696	100.00	–	150	0
Valid votes	3,082,696	97.11			
Invalid/blank votes	91,740	2.89			
Total votes	3,174,436	100.00			
Registered voters/turnout	3,770,073	84.20			
Source: University of Essex
