= Christian Democratic Movement =

Slovak political party

Christian Democratic Movement Kresťanskodemokratické hnutie
- Abbreviation: KDH
- Leader: Milan Majerský
- Deputy Leaders: Marián Čaučík; Igor Janckulík; Ján Horecký
- General Secretary: Marek Michalčík
- Parliamentary caucus leader: Igor Janckulík
- Founder: Ján Čarnogurský
- Founded: 17 February 1990
- Headquarters: Šafárikovo námestie 77/4, 81102 Bratislava
- Youth wing: Christian Democratic Youth of Slovakia
- Membership (2024): ▲5,913
- Ideology: Christian democracy; Social conservatism
- Political position: Centre-right
- European affiliation: European People's Party
- European Parliament group: European People's Party Group
- International affiliation: Centrist Democrat International (observer)
- Colours: Blue; Red
- Slogan: Better (2023)
- Anthem: "Slovensko moje, otčina moja" ('My Slovakia, My Fatherland')
- National Council: 11 / 150
- European Parliament: 1 / 15
- Regional governors: 1 / 8
- Regional deputies (Note: Also with coalitions.): 62 / 419
- Mayors: 244 / 2,904
- Local councillors: 2,497 / 20,462

Website
- kdh.sk

The Christian Democratic Movement (Slovak: Kresťanskodemokratické hnutie, KDH) is a Christian democratic political party in Slovakia that is a member of the European People's Party (EPP) and an observer of the Centrist Democrat International.

== History ==
In the 2014 European elections, KDH came second place nationally, receiving 13.21% of the vote and electing 2 MEPs.

In the 2016 parliamentary election, the party only won 4.94% of the vote, losing all of its seats. This was the first time since its inception that the party did not reach the parliament. Following the electoral defeat, KDH elected Alojz Hlina its new leader.

== Party leaders ==
Leader		Year
1	Ján Čarnogurský	1990–2000
2	Pavol Hrušovský	2000–2009
3	Ján Figeľ	2009–2016
4	Alojz Hlina	2016–2020
5	Milan Majerský	2020–present

== Election results ==
=== Czechoslovak Parliament ===
Election	Leader	Chamber of People					Chamber of Nations					Government
Election	Leader	Votes	%	Seats	+/–	Position	Votes	%	Seats	+/–	Position	Government
1990	Ján Čarnogurský	644,008	6.05	11 / 150	▲11	▲4th	564,172	5.31	14 / 150	▲14	▲4th	Coalition
1992	Ján Čarnogurský	277,061	2.89	6 / 150	▼5	▼10th	272,100	2.84	8 / 150	▼6	▼7th	Opposition

=== Slovak National Council ===
Election	Leader	Votes	%	Rank	Seats	+/–	Government
1990	Ján Čarnogurský	648,782	19.2	▲2nd	31 / 150	▲31	VPN–KDH–DS
1992	Ján Čarnogurský	273,945	8.9	▼3rd	18 / 150	▼13	Opposition (1992–1994)
1992	Ján Čarnogurský	273,945	8.9	▼3rd	18 / 150	▼13	SDĽ–KDH–DEÚS–NDS (1994)

=== National Council ===
Election	Leader	Votes	%	Rank	Seats	+/–	Government
1994	Ján Čarnogurský	289,987	10.1	▼4th	17 / 150	▼1	Opposition
1998	Ján Čarnogurský	884,497	26.3	▲2nd	15 / 150	▼2	SDK–SDĽ–SMK–SOP
1998	Part of the Slovak Democratic Coalition (SDK), which won 42 seats in total						
2002	Pavol Hrušovský	237,202	8.3	▼5th	15 / 150	0	SDKÚ–SMK–KDH–ANO (2002–2006)
2002	Pavol Hrušovský	237,202	8.3	▼5th	15 / 150	0	Opposition (2006)
2006	Pavol Hrušovský	191,443	8.3	▼6th	14 / 150	▼1	Opposition
2010	Ján Figeľ	215,755	8.5	▲4th	15 / 150	▲1	SDKÚ–SaS–KDH–Bridge
2012	Ján Figeľ	225,361	8.8	▲2nd	16 / 150	▲1	Opposition
2016	Ján Figeľ	128,908	4.9	▼9th	0 / 150	▼16	No seats
2020	Alojz Hlina	134,099	4.7	▲8th	0 / 150	0	No seats
2023	Milan Majerský	202,515	6.8	▲5th	12 / 150	▲12	Opposition

=== European Parliament ===
Election	List leader	Votes	%	Rank	Seats	+/–	EP Group
2004	Anna Záborská	113,655	16.2	▲4th	3 / 14	▲3	EPP-ED
2009	Martin Fronc	89,905	10.9	4th	2 / 13	▼1	EPP
2014	Anna Záborská	74,108	13.2	▲2nd	2 / 13	0	EPP
2019	Ivan Štefanec	95,588	9.7	▼4th	2 / 14	0	EPP
2024	Miriam Lexmann	105,602	7.2	▼5th	1 / 15	▼1	EPP

=== President ===
Election	Candidate	First round			Second round		
Election	Candidate	Votes	%	Rank	Votes	%	Rank
1999	Endorsed; Rudolf Schuster	1,396,950	47.4	1st	1,727,48	57.2	1st
2004	František Mikloško	129,414	6.5	5th	not qualified		
2009	Endorsed; Iveta Radičová	713,735	38.1	2nd	988,808	44.5	2nd
2014	Pavol Hrušovský	63,298	3.3	6th	not qualified		
2019	Endorsed; František Mikloško	122,916	5.7	5th	not qualified		
2024	Endorsed; Ivan Korčok	958,393	42.5	1st	1,243,709	46.9	2nd

== See also ==
- Politics of Slovakia
- List of political parties in Slovakia
- Slovak Democratic and Christian Union – Democratic Party
