= Peasants' Party of Slovakia =

Peasants' Party of Slovakia Roľnícka strana Slovenska
- Abbreviation: RSS
- Leader: Pavel Delinga
- Founded: 1990
- Dissolved: 1997
- Merged into: New Agrarian Party
- Ideology: Agrarianism
- Political position: Centre

The Peasants' Party of Slovakia (Roľnícka strana Slovenska, RSS) was a political party in Slovakia from 1990 to 1997. It was established after the Velvet Revolution in October 1990.

After the 1994 Slovak parliamentary election the party entered parliament as part of a joint electoral list with the HZDS. The chairman of the party was Paul Delinga and the vice president Miroslav Maxon.

In 1997 the RSS got about 1-2% in the polls and it merged with the Movement of the Farmers of the Slovak Republic (Hnutím poľnohospodárov SR, HP SR). The name of the new Party was New Agrarian Party (Nová agrárna strana, NAS). Paul Delinga became Chairman of the NAS.

In 1998 the NAS merged with the then governing party HZDS.

== See also ==
- Politics of Slovakia
- List of political parties in Slovakia
