= Public Against Violence =

Public Against Violence Verejnosť proti násiliu
- Abbreviation: VPN
- Leader: Fedor Gál, Ján Budaj
- Founded: 19 November 1989
- Dissolved: 27 April 1991
- Succeeded by: Civic Democratic Union
- Headquarters: Bratislava, Czechoslovakia
- Ideology: Liberalism; Pro-Europeanism
- Political position: Centre

Public Against Violence (Slovak: Verejnosť proti násiliu, VPN) was a political movement established in Bratislava, Slovakia in November 1989. It was the Slovak counterpart of the Czech Civic Forum.

== Velvet Revolution ==
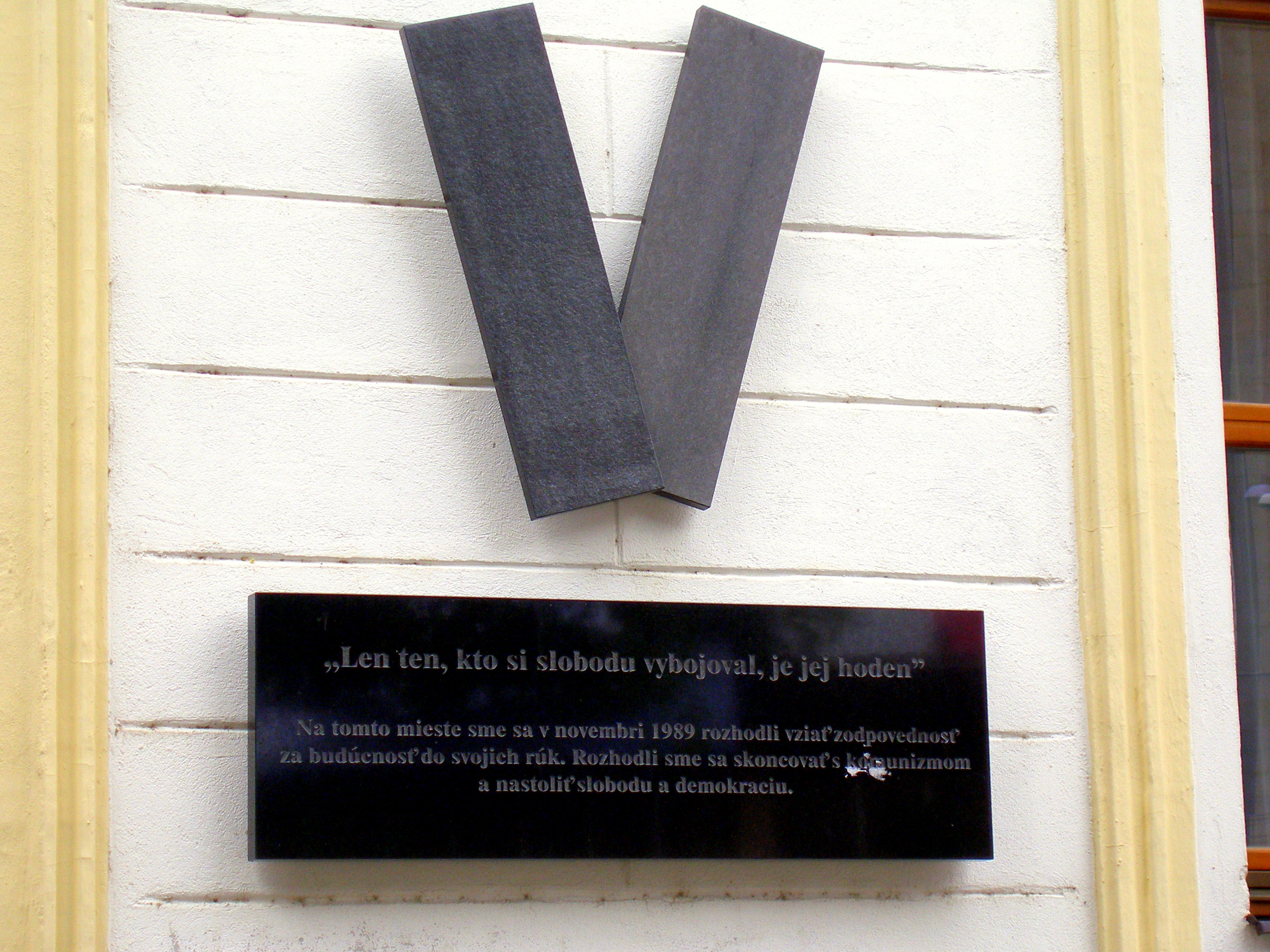
Memorial of the Velvet revolution in Bratislava (Námestie SNP)

Public Against Violence (VPN) was founded during the Velvet Revolution, which overthrew the Communist Party rule in Czechoslovakia. After riot police cracked down on a student demonstration in Prague on the 17 November 1989 a growing series of demonstrations were held in Czechoslovakia. On the 19 November Civic Forum was founded in Prague as a coalition of opposition groups demanding the removal of the Communist leadership. The same evening a meeting was held in Bratislava, Slovakia attended by about 500 people where Public Against Violence was founded. The following day a first meeting of the coordinating committee of Public Against Violence took place.

Public Against Violence was similar to Civic Forum in being a broad movement in opposition to Communism. The founders of Public Against Violence included actor Milan Kňažko, dissident Ján Budaj and sociologist Fedor Gál, and the movement included cultural figures, religious and intellectual dissidents. Other early leaders included Catholic dissident Ján Čarnogurský whose trial was stopped during the revolution, František Mikloško and Miroslav Kusy, Vladimír Mečiar and the ex-leader of the Communist Party during the Prague Spring Alexander Dubček. Like Civic Forum, Public Against Violence called for the dominant role of the Communist Party to be ended, with a provisional government composed both of Communists and the opposition, leading to free elections. However Public Against Violence also called for relations between the Czechs and Slovaks to be altered in a new democratic federation.

Protests spread across Slovakia in November 1989 with branches of Public Against Violence being founded in many towns. Civic Forum and Public Against Violence worked together in negotiations with the Communist government, with Ján Čarnogurský representing Public Against Violence at talks together with Václav Havel for Civic Forum. After a two-hour general strike on 27 November demonstrated support for the opposition, agreement was reached on the 29 November for the leading role of the Communist Party to be ended.

== Interim government ==
After the rejection by the opposition of an interim government which would have been largely Communist, another government of Czechoslovakia was formed on the 7 December 1989, with Slovak Communist Marián Čalfa as Prime Minister of Czechoslovakia. Čalfa went on to leave the Communist Party on the 18 January 1990 and would then join Public Against Violence. The government initially had an 11 to 10 majority of non-Communists, but this grew as people left the Communist party, while Václav Havel was elected President of Czechoslovakia and Alexander Dubček became the chair of the Federal Assembly.

In Slovakia a new government was also formed on the 12 December 1989 led by the Communist Minister of Justice Milan Čič, with equal numbers of Communists and non-Communists. Members of Public Against Violence formed part of the government, including Vladimír Mečiar as interior minister, and like Marián Čalfa nationally, Milan Čič would leave the Communist party in 1990 and joined Public Against Violence.

However Public Against Violence began to split even before the first democratic elections were held. At the beginning of 1990 Ján Čarnogurský and advocates of Christian democracy left Public Against Violence and founded the Christian Democratic Movement party in February 1990.

== 1990 elections ==
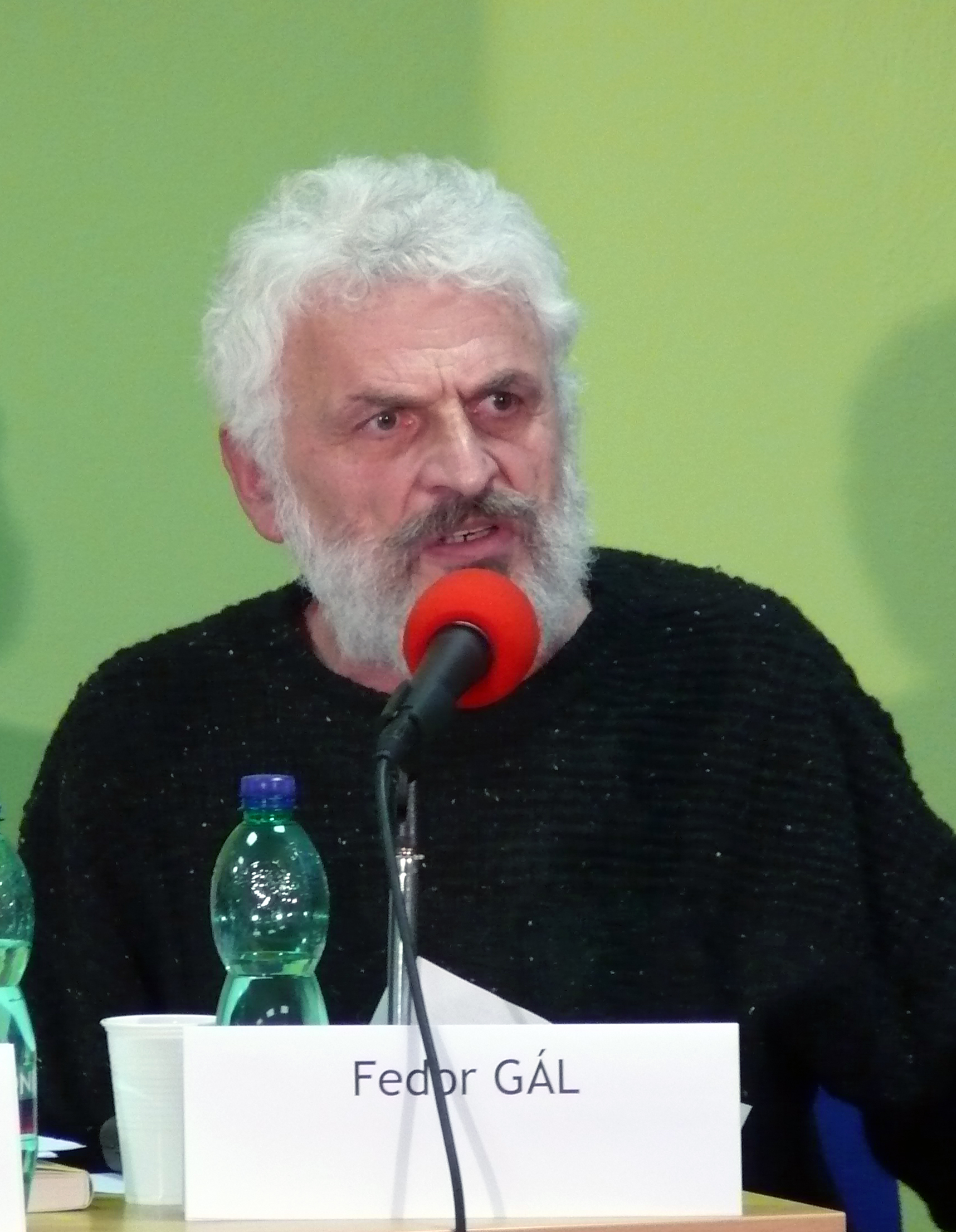
Chairman of Public Against Violence Fedor Gál

Going into the first free elections in June 1990 Public Against Violence wanted greater powers for Slovakia, but backed continuing the union between the Czechs and Slovaks. However they called for the emphasis to be on the economy and environment, rather than Slovak nationalism.

Candidates for Public Against Violence at the 1990 election included the prime minister of Czechoslovakia Marián Čalfa and Alexander Dubček, the ex-leader of the Communist Party during the Prague Spring.

In the lead up to the 1990 elections opinion polls showed Public Against Violence with between 18 and 25% support in Slovakia, behind the Christian Democratic Movement on 25 to 30%. Public Against Violence was reported to be suffering from an increase in Slovak nationalism and many rural voters saw intellectuals from Public Against Violence as alien to them. However Public Against Violence gained during the campaign on their anti-communist credentials with Václav Havel being well received when he campaigned in Slovakia. A poll on 1 June 1990 showed Public Against Violence ahead of the Christian Democratic Movement in Slovakia for the first time.

The election results saw Public Against Violence finish first in Slovakia, both in the federal and Slovak elections. In the federal election together the combination of Civic Forum and Public Against Violence won a majority, while in the Slovak election Public Against Violence came first but short of a majority. However, on election night one of the founders of Public Against Violence, deputy chairman Ján Budaj, announced his withdrawal from politics as he had been pressed to co-operate with the secret police in the 1970s.

Following the election Marián Čalfa of Public Against Violence continued to lead a coalition government nationally as Prime Minister of Czechoslovakia, while Vladimír Mečiar of Public Against Violence led a coalition government in Slovakia together with the Christian Democratic Movement.

== Split ==
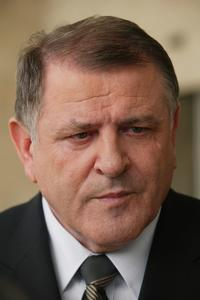
Vladimír Mečiar, who led the breakaway Movement for a Democratic Slovakia

As time passed from the Velvet Revolution, the approval rating for both Civic Forum and Public Against Violence dropped from 60% in February 1990 to 38% in October 1990. In local elections held in November 1990 Public Against Violence came second to the Christian Democratic Movement in Slovakia. Public Against Violence was reported to have won 20.4% of the vote in Slovakia, compared to 27.4% for the Christian Democratic Movement. An opinion poll in November 1990 also showed support for Public Against Violence had fallen to 17%.

Public Against Violence faced tensions over the amount of power that should be held centrally in Czechoslovakia and how much should be held in Slovakia. This led to a split in March 1991 when the prime minister of Slovakia Vladimír Mečiar walked out of a leadership meeting of Public Against Violence and formed a rival wing of the party called PAV-Platform for Democratic Slovakia. Mečiar and his supporters had accused the leadership, including the leader Fedor Gál of being too close to Prague and Mečiar called for economic reforms to be less vigorous due to fears that Slovakia would lose the most economically. However the leadership of Public Against Violence accused Mečiar of wanting an independent Slovakia and of joining with Communists.

On the 23 April 1991 Vladimír Mečiar was replaced as Prime Minister of Slovakia by the leader of the Christian Democratic Movement Ján Čarnogurský. This came after the majority of Public Against Violence joined with the Christian Democratic Movement to replace Mečiar.

At an extraordinary party congress held on 27 April 1991, a new party called Movement for a Democratic Slovakia split off from Public Against Violence.

== Decline and dissolution ==
Following the split the Movement for a Democratic Slovakia quickly became the most popular party in Slovakia and consistently led in the opinion polls in 1991 and 1992, while Mečiar was the most popular politician. Public Against Violence meanwhile dropped further in the polls to just 3% in July 1991, compared to 38% for the Movement for a Democratic Slovakia.

Also in July 1991 Alexander Dubček quit the Public Against Violence movement, accusing Public Against Violence of having moved too far to the right. Public Against Violence finally became a political party in October 1991 and renamed itself as Civic Democratic Union (Občianska demokratická únia, ODÚ) in March 1992.

The Civic Democratic Union contested the 1992 elections, but failed to win any seats. It won 4.0% of the Slovak vote for the House of the People, 4.0% for the House of Nations and 4.0% in the election for the Slovak National Council. The Civic Democratic Union finally dissolved in November 1992 and many former members of Civic Democratic Union would go on to join the Democratic Party in 1994.

Public Against Violence has been seen to have failed due to an inability to establish a popular constituency; instead concentrating on government and parliamentary activities. More nationalist politicians were able to exploit this and played on public distrust of a Public Against Violence, that was perceived to be composed of the elite.

== Election results ==
=== Federal Assembly ===
==== House of the People ====
Year	Vote	Vote %	Seats	Place	Position
1990	1,104,125	10,4	19 / 150	3rd	Majority Government

==== House of Nations ====
Year	Vote	Vote %	Seats	Places	Position
1990	1,262,278	11,9	33 / 150	3rd	Majority Government

=== National Council ===
Year	Vote	Vote %	Seats	Place	Cabinet
1990	991,285	29,35	48 / 150	1st	Mečiar I, Čarnogurský
