= National Council of Slovakia =

Legislature of Slovakia

Coordinates: 48°08′31″N 17°05′50″E

National Council of the Slovak Republic Národná rada Slovenskej republiky

Type
- Type: Unicameral

History
- Founded: 1 January 1993, 31 years ago
- Preceded by: • Slovak National Council • Federal Assembly

Leadership
- Speaker: Richard Raši, Hlas since 26 March 2025
- Deputy speakers: Andrej Danko, SNS since 25 October 2023
- Peter Žiga, Hlas since 25 October 2023
- Tibor Gašpar, Smer since 27 June 2024
- Martin Dubéci, PS since 18 June 2025

Structure
- Seats: 150
- Political groups: Government (Fico's Fourth Cabinet) (78): Smer (41); Hlas (25); SNS (8) (Note: SNS (5); Slovak Patriot (1); Smer (1); Independent (1)); Non-affiliated (4) (Note: Rural Party (3); Slovak Patriot (1)); Opposition (72): PS (33); S–ZĽ (12) (Note: Slovakia (10); ZĽ (1); NOVA (1)); KDH (12); SaS (12) (Note: Freedom and Solidarity (10); Civic Conservatives (1); Independent (1)); Non-affiliated (3) (Note: Democrats (1); KÚ (1); Independent (1))
- Committees: 19 Committees

Elections
- Voting system: Open list proportional representation with a 5% electoral threshold (7% for two-, three-party alliances; 10% for four-or-more party alliance) allocated under the largest remainder method with Hagenbach-Bischoff quota
- First election: 30 September – 1 October 1994
- Last election: 30 September 2023
- Next election: By 25 September 2027

Meeting place
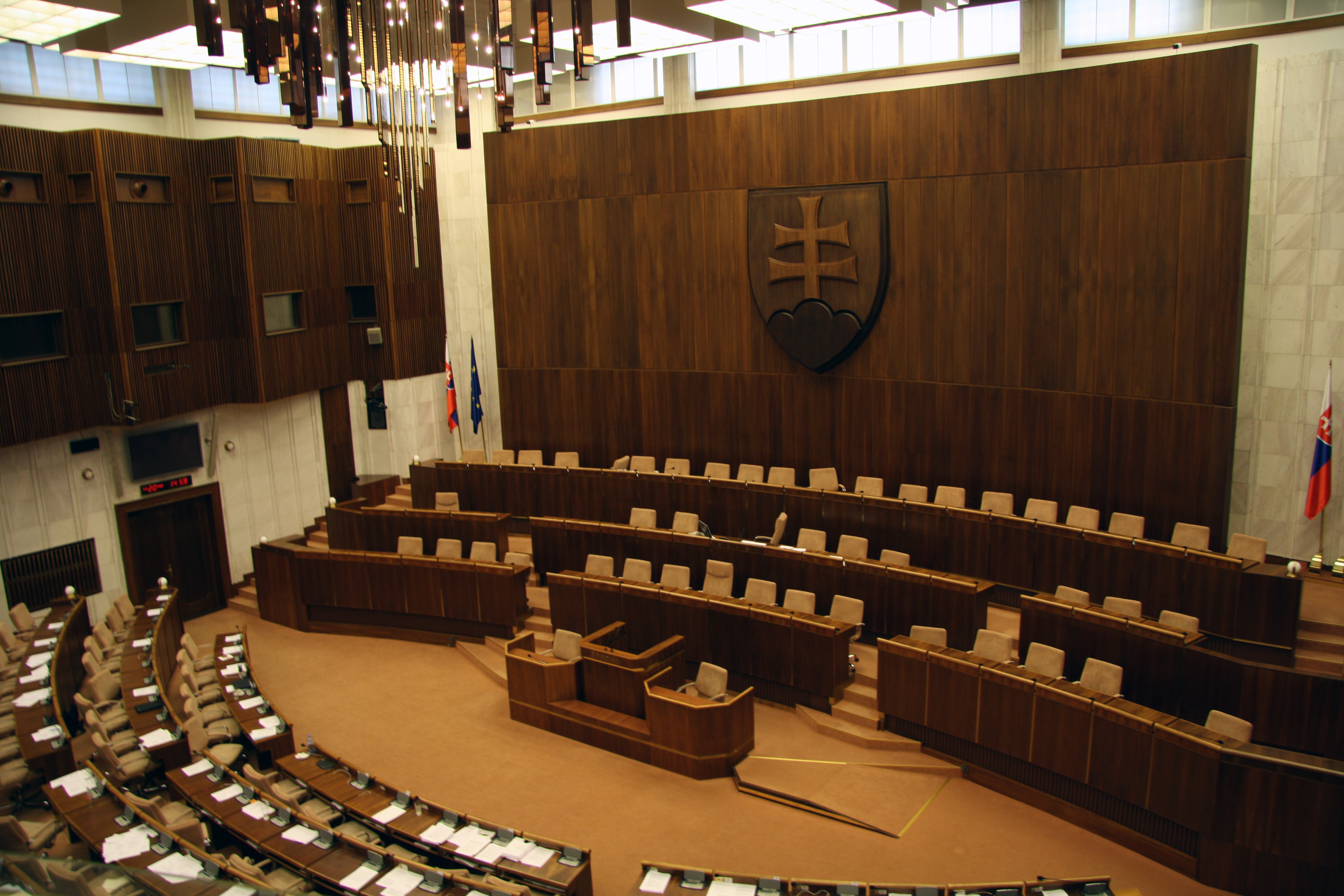
- Parliament Building, Bratislava

Website
- www.nrsr.sk

The National Council of the Slovak Republic (Slovak: Národná rada Slovenskej republiky, abbreviated to NR SR) is the national parliament of Slovakia. It is unicameral and consists of 150 members, who are elected by universal suffrage under proportional representation with seats distributed via largest remainder method with Hagenbach-Bischoff quota every four years.

Slovakia's parliament has been called the 'National Council' since 1 October 1992. From 1943 to 1992, its predecessor, the parliament of the Slovak part of Czechoslovakia, was called the Slovak National Council (Slovak: Slovenská národná rada).

The National Council approves domestic legislation, constitutional laws, and the annual budget. Its consent is required to ratify international treaties, and is responsible for approving military operations. It also elects individuals to some positions in the executive and judiciary, as specified by law.

The parliament building is in Bratislava, Slovakia's capital, next to Bratislava Castle in Alexander Dubček Square.

== Functions ==
The 150-seat unicameral National Council of the Slovak Republic is Slovakia's sole constitutional and legislative body. It considers and approves the constitution, constitutional amendments, and other legislation. It approves the state budget. It elects some officials specified by law, as well as justices of the Constitutional Court and the prosecutor general. Prior to their ratification, the parliament also should approve all important international treaties. Moreover, it gives consent for dispatching of military forces outside of Slovakia's territory and for the presence of foreign military forces on the territory of the Slovak Republic.

== Decision-making ==
The parliament may vote only if a majority of all its members (76) are present. To pass a decision, the approval of a simple majority of all MPs present is required. Almost all legal acts can be adopted by this relative majority. An absolute majority (76 votes) is required to pass a vote of no-confidence in the cabinet or its members, or to elect and recall the Council's speaker or the deputy speakers. A qualified majority of 3/5 of all deputies (at least 90 votes) is required for the adoption of a constitution or a constitutional statute.

== Committees of the National Council ==
Standing committees and current leadership are listed below.

Committee	Chairperson	Party
Mandate and Immunity Committee (Slovak: Mandátový a imunitný výbor)	Marián Saloň	Smer-SD
Function Incompatibility Committee (Slovak: Výbor pre nezlučiteľnosť funkcií)	Veronika Remišová	ZĽ
Committee for European Affairs (Slovak: Výbor pre európske záležitosti)	Ján Ferenčák	Hlas-SD
Constitutional Committee (Slovak: Ústavnoprávny výbor)	Miroslav Čellár	Smer-SD
Committee for Finance and Budget (Slovak: Výbor pre financie a rozpočet)	Ján Blcháč	Hlas-SD
Committee for Economic Affairs (Slovak: Výbor pre ekonomické záležitosti)	Róbert Puci	Hlas-SD
Committee for Agriculture and the Environment (Slovak: Výbor pre pôdohospodárstvo a životné prostredie)	Vacant	
Committee for Public Administration and Regional Development (Slovak: Výbor pre verejnú správu a regionálny rozvoj)	Michal Šipoš	Slovakia
Committee for Social Affairs (Slovak: Výbor pre sociálne veci)	Ján Richter	Smer-SD
Committee for Health (Slovak: Výbor pre zdravotníctvo)	Vladimir Baláž	Smer-SD
Committee for Defence and Security (Slovak: Výbor pre obranu a bezpečnosť)	Richard Glück	Smer-SD
Foreign Committee (Slovak: Zahraničný výbor)	Marián Kéry	Smer-SD
Committee for Education, Science, Youth and Sport (Slovak: Výbor pre vzdelávanie, vedu, mládež a šport)	Jozef Habánik	Smer-SD
Committee for Culture and Media (Slovak: Výbor pre kultúru a médiá)	Roman Michelko	SNS
Committee for Human Rights and National Minorities (Slovak: Výbor pre ľudské práva a národnostné menšiny)	Lucia Plaváková	PS
Special Control Committee to Control the Activities of the NBU (Slovak: Osobitný kontrolný výbor pre kontrolu čiinosti NBÚ)	Roman Mikulec	Slovakia
Special Control Committee to Control the Activities of the SIS (Slovak: Osobitný kontrolný výbor pre kontrolu čiinosti SIS)	Vacant	
Special Control Committee to Control the Activities of the Military Intelligence (Slovak: Osobitný kontrolný výbor pre kontrolu činnosti Vojenského Spravodajstva)	Tomáš Valášek	PS
Committee for Review of Decisions of the NBU (Slovak: Výbor na preskúmavanie rozhodnutí NBÚ)	Irena Bihariová	PS

== Speakers ==
Richard Raši has served as Speaker of the National Council of the Slovak Republic since 26 March, 2025.

== Structure of former legislatures ==
The length of the bars underneath represents each party's electoral performance. The difference in the total width of the bars is due to the election threshold of 5%; this threshold prevents a varying number of small parties from entering the National Council (most notably, after the 1994 election).

=== Slovak Parliament 1990–1992 ===
22	7	48	6	31	14	22
KSS	DS	VPN	SZ	KDH	Együttélés–MKDM	SNS

=== Slovak Parliament 1992–1994 ===
29	18	74	14	15
SDĽ	KDH	HZDS	Együttélés–MKDM	SNS

=== Slovak Parliament 1994–1998 ===
18	13	15	17	61	17	9
Common Choice	ZRS	DEÚS	KDH	HZDS–RSS	Hungarian Coalition	SNS

=== Slovak Parliament 1998–2002 ===
23	13	42	43	15	14
SDĽ	SOP	SDK	ĽS–HZDS	SMK–MKP	SNS

=== Slovak Parliament 2002–2006 ===
11	25	15	28	15	36	20
KSS	Smer	ANO	SDKÚ–DS	KDH	ĽS–HZDS	SMK–MKP

=== Slovak Parliament 2006–2010 ===
50	31	14	15	20	20
Smer	SDKÚ–DS	KDH	ĽS–HZDS	SMK–MKP	SNS

=== Slovak Parliament 2010–2012 ===
62	14	28	15	22	9
Smer	Most–Híd	SDKÚ–DS	KDH	SaS	SNS

=== Slovak Parliament 2012–2016 ===
83	13	11	16	16	11
Smer	Most–Híd	SDKÚ–DS	KDH	OĽaNO	SaS

=== Slovak Parliament 2016–2020 ===
49	10	11	19	21	11	15	14
Smer	Network	Most–Híd	OĽaNO–NOVA	SaS	We Are Family	SNS	ĽSNS

=== Slovak Parliament 2020–2023 ===
38	12	53	13	17	17
Smer	For the People	OĽaNO–NOVA–KÚ–ZZ	SaS	We Are Family	ĽSNS

=== Slovak Parliament 2023–2027 ===
42	27	32	16	11	12	10
Smer	Hlas	PS	OĽaNO	SaS	KDH	SNS

== Elections ==
Members of the parliament are elected directly for a 4-year term, under the proportional system. Although the suffrage is universal, only a citizen who has the right to vote, has attained 21 years of age and has permanent residency in the Slovak Republic is eligible to be elected. Similarly to the Netherlands and Israel, the whole country forms one multi-member constituency. The election threshold is 5%. Voters may indicate their preferences within the semi-open list. Parliamentary elections were last held in 2023.

=== Latest election ===
2023 Slovak Parliamentary Election

== Members (1990–present) ==
- List of members of the National Council of Slovakia, 1990–92
- List of members of the National Council of Slovakia, 1992–94
- List of members of the National Council of Slovakia, 1994–98
- List of members of the National Council of Slovakia, 1998–2002
- List of members of the National Council of Slovakia, 2002–06
- List of members of the National Council of Slovakia, 2006–10
- List of members of the National Council of Slovakia, 2010–12
- List of members of the National Council of Slovakia, 2012–2016
- List of members of the National Council of Slovakia, 2016–2020
- List of members of the National Council of Slovakia, 2020–2023
- List of members of the National Council of Slovakia, 2023–2027

== Buildings ==
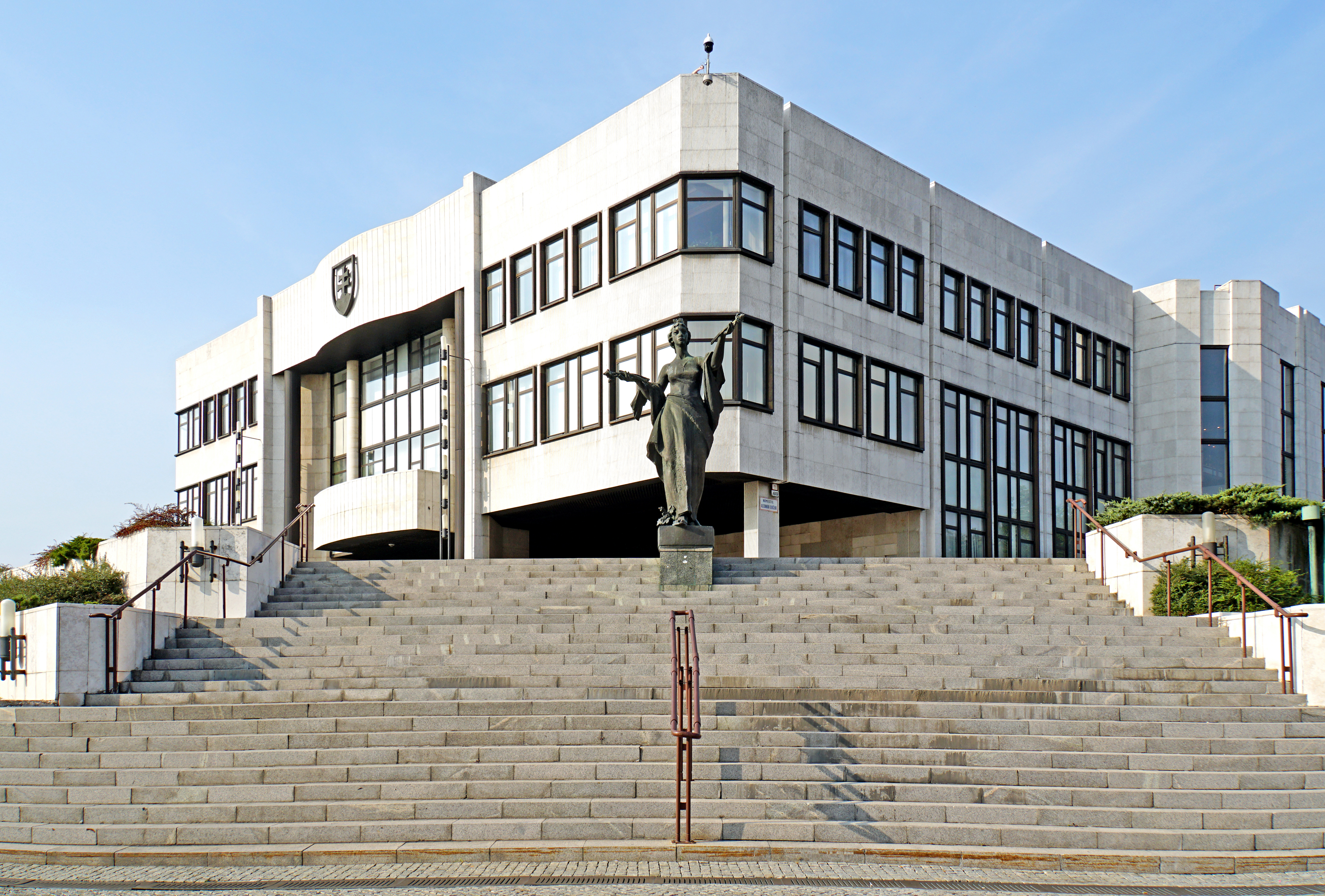
National Council of the Slovak Republic Building

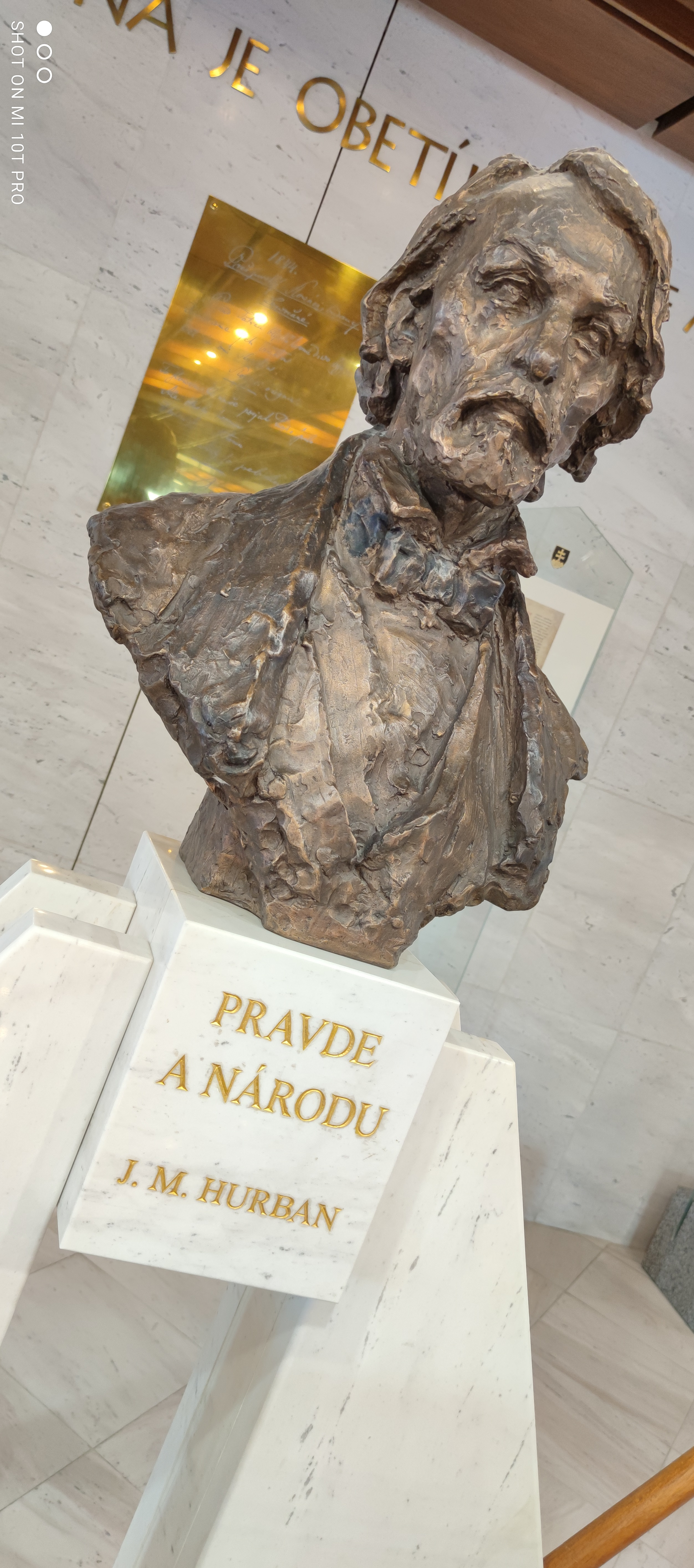
Bust of Jozef Miloslav Hurban, founder of the First Slovak National Council (1848) in the National Council of the Slovak Republic

The main parliament building is situated next to the Bratislava Castle on the castle hill. The building is insufficiently large to accommodate all officials and representatives. The construction started in 1986 when Slovakia was part of Czechoslovakia as a building for the Federal Parliament, which usually met in Prague. The secondary parliament building, the Zhupa house, which was the main building until 1994, is situated at Župné square next to the Trinitarian Church below the castle hill in Bratislava.
