= Democratic Union of Slovakia =

Democratic Union of Slovakia Demokratická únia Slovenska
- Abbreviation: DEÚS
- Leader: Jozef Moravčík
- Founded: 23 April 1994
- Dissolved: 25 March 1995
- Merger of: Alternative Political Realism and Alliance of Democrats of Slovakia
- Merged into: Democratic Union
- Ideology: Liberal conservatism
- Political position: Centre

The Democratic Union of Slovakia (Slovak: Demokratická únia Slovenska, DEÚS) was a political party in Slovakia led by Jozef Moravčík.

== History ==
The party was created on 23 April 1994 by a merger of Alternative Political Realism and the Alliance of Democrats of Slovakia. In the parliamentary elections in September/October that year the party received 9% of the vote, winning 15 of the National Council.

On 25 March 1995 the party merged with the National Democratic Party to form the Democratic Union.
