= Civic Conservative Party (Slovakia) =

Slovak political party

Civic Conservative Party Občianska konzervatívna strana
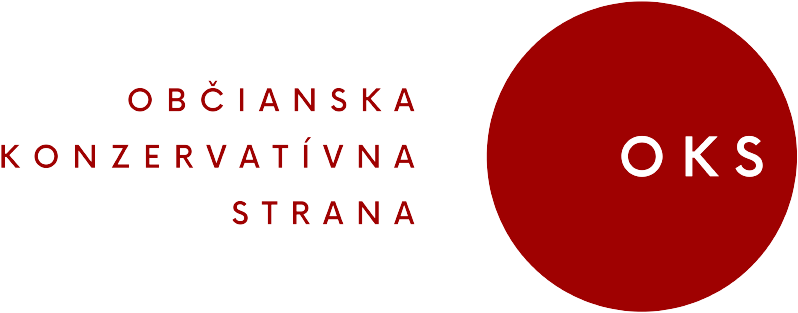
- Chairperson: Ondrej Dostál
- Presidium: Radovan Kazda; Zuzana Aufrichtová; Juraj Bakoš; Martin Mlýnek
- Founder: František Šebej
- Founded: 10 November 2001
- Split from: Democratic Party
- Headquarters: Panenská 671/26, 81103 Bratislava-Staré Mesto
- Membership (2022): ▲84
- Ideology: Liberal conservatism; Economic liberalism; Anti-communism
- Political position: Centre-right
- National affiliation: SaS
- Colours: Burgundy
- National Council: 1 / 150
- European Parliament: 0 / 15
- Regional governors: 0 / 8
- Regional deputies (Note: Also with coalitions.): 35 / 419
- Mayors (Note: Also with coalitions.): 3 / 2,904
- Local councillors (Note: Also with coalitions.): 84 / 20,462

Website
- oks.sk

The Civic Conservative Party (Slovak: Občianska konzervatívna strana, OKS) is a centre-right liberal conservative political party in Slovakia. It has one seat in the National Council, following the 2023 election. It has also representation at regional and local level.

The OKS was founded in November 2001 as a parliamentary schism from the Democratic Party. The party has relied on electoral alliances with other centre-right parties, including the Sloboda a Solidarita (SaS), Most–Híd and Conservative Democrats of Slovakia (KDS). The party won its best result, of 2.1%, in alliance with the KDS at the 2009 European election. The party won seats in the National Council for the first time in 2010, on the Most–Híd list. In 2016 the party won one seat in the National Council on the Sloboda a Solidarita list and in 2020 election the party won two seats also on the Sloboda a Solidarita list.

The OKS was a member of the Alliance of Conservatives and Reformists in Europe until 2022.

== History ==
The Civic Conservative Party was formed by Democratic Party (DS) members of the National Council on 10 November 2001. The DS initially offered the OKS and the Liberal-Democratic Union to run in the 2002 election, on a united list, but then withdrew and endorsed the Slovak Democratic and Christian Union. The OKS attempted to negotiate a joint list with the Christian Democratic Movement and Party of the Hungarian Coalition, but this failed to materialise. Undeterred, the OKS ran alone under the banner 'Call for Slovakia' (Výzva pre Slovensko) and gained 9,422 votes, or 0.32% of the national total.

In the December 2002 local elections, two mayors were elected for OKS. In addition, OKS took 20 deputy seats, or 0.1% of the seats nationwide. In July 2003, it was one of four parties across Europe endorsing the soft eurosceptic Prague Appeal, along with the British Conservative Party, Law and Justice of Poland, and the Czech Civic Democrats.

The OKS supported František Mikloško of the Christian Democratic Movement (KDH) in the 2004 presidential election. Mikloško was one of the few candidates not being former members of the Communist Party of Czechoslovakia, and ended up fifth with 6.51% share of the total vote. In the European election two months later, the party fielded Peter Osuský as its sole candidate. He received 7,016 votes: 1% share of the vote.

In the 2005 regional elections, the party gained three seats: František Šebej and Peter Tatár in Bratislava Region and Katarína Adamicová in Žilina Region. This represented 0.72% share nationwide.

OKS offered to run on the common candidate list with the Christian Democratic Movement in the 2006 parliamentary election. This offer was turned down by the KDH, the Civic Conservatives had to raise 500,000 korún as a fee for the party to participate. In March 2006, OKS member Ondrej Dostál applied to the Constitutional Court, considering the possible unconstitutionality of the election participation fee, saying the fee affects his right to run for office. In the election, former chairman of the Czechoslovak Constitutional Court Ernest Valko and former Minister of Health Rudolf Zajac appeared on the OKS list. The party obtained 6,262 votes which represented 0.27% share of the total vote.

In the 2009 regional elections, the OKS won four seats, up one from 2005: three in Bratislava Region and one in Žilina Region.

=== Parliamentary party ===
In the 2010 election, fourteen OKS members stood on the Most–Híd party list. Strongly defining themselves as against the left-wing nationalist coalition, four MPs were elected from the list, along with ten Most–Híd members. This gave the OKS its first parliamentary representation since 2002. Most–Híd entered a centre-right coalition government, which the Civic Conservatives supported, but the OKS did not join the government themselves, and remained separate from Most–Híd.

In August, the party objected to coalition plans for tax reform, calling instead for closing tax loopholes and funding lower taxes by cutting government spending. In October 2010, Peter Zajac called for Dobroslav Trnka to step down as General Prosecutor, after Trnka criticised Interior Minister Daniel Lipšic and other officials, saying that Trnka did not respect the law or the human rights of ethnic Hungarians. The party supported changes to the controversial State Language Act, but the OKS's Ondrej Dostál said the changes did not go far enough in allowing use of minority languages.

In March 2011, the party opposed the government's plans to increase taxes on the self-employed, and instead proposed funding cuts in payroll tax by cutting government spending. The four OKS MPs have proposed a law restricting the government's power to build highways on privately owned land, which had earlier been ruled unconstitutional.

In October 2011, the party opposed the government's commitment to the European Financial Stability Facility. In response, František Šebej left the OKS on 11 October and joined Most–Híd. After the subsequent fall of the government, the OKS attempted to renew their alliance with Most–Híd at the 2012 election, but were rejected. Instead, several OKS candidates were running on the Ordinary People list. However, they had left the list before the elections, in protest to the request of the leader of Ordinary People Igor Matovič, that all candidates from the list undertake polygraph test.

== Ideology ==
The party advocates respect for people regardless of their religion, race and nationality. Their aim is to pursue conservative values stemming from the inner need of individuals to live in a world whose highest value is personal freedom tempered by personal responsibility and an awareness of personal obligations towards society.

The OKS characterizes itself as a party of reforms. According to its platform, it rejects:

- all kinds of social engineering
- totalitarianism and autocracy
- historical, as well as current value relativism.

It respects the historical memory as a part of the national cultural identity and thus rejects lining up behind autocracy, communism and fascism.

The stated aim of the OKS is to pursue the system of European conservative values such as consistency, veracity, fairness, honesty, respectability, solidarity, and observance of written and non-written treaties and agreements.

== Election results ==
| Election | Leader | Votes | % | Rank | Seats | +/– | Status |
|---|---|---|---|---|---|---|---|
| 2002 | Peter Tatár | 9,422 | 0.33% | 17th | 0 / 150 | Steady | Opposition |
| 2006 | Peter Tatár | 6,262 | 0.27% | 14th | 0 / 150 | Steady | Opposition |
| 2010 | with Most–Híd | | | | 4 / 150 | ▲4 | SDKÚ-DS–SaS–KDH–Most–Híd |
| 2016 | with SaS | | | | 1 / 150 | ▲1 | Opposition |
| 2020 | with SaS | | | | 2 / 150 | ▲1 | OĽaNO–SR–SaS–ZĽ |
| 2023 | with SaS | | | | 1 / 150 | ▼1 | Opposition |

=== Elected representatives ===
The OKS had three members of regional parliaments in 2009–2013:

- Katarína Adamicová (Žilina)
- René Bílik (Bratislava)
- Ondrej Dostál (Bratislava)

A fourth member of a regional parliament, František Šebej (Bratislava), left the party in 2011.

In 2010–2012 OKS had four members of the National Council, embedded within the Most–Híd party list of candidates:

- Ondrej Dostál
- Peter Osuský
- František Šebej
- Peter Zajac

In 2012–2016 OKS did not have any Member of Parliament.

After 2016 parliamentary elections OKS had one Member of the National Council. Ondrej Dostál, party leader, was elected on the party list of Sloboda a Solidarita (SaS).

Since the 2020 parliamentary elections OKS has two Members of the National Council. Ondrej Dostál, party leader, and Radovan Kazda were elected on the party list of Sloboda a Solidarita (SaS).

== Leaders ==
- Peter Tatár (2001–2006)
- Collective leadership (2006–2007)
- Peter Zajac (2007–2012)
- Ondrej Dostál (2012–present)

== See also ==
- Category:Civic Conservative Party (Slovakia) politicians
