= Mečiar's First Cabinet =

Cabinet of Slovakia, 1992 to 1994

- 7th Cabinet of Slovakia (Czechoslovakia)
- 27 June 1990 – 22 April 1991
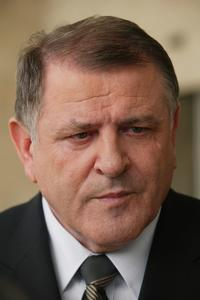
- Vladimír Mečiar in 2004
- Date formed: 27 June 1990
- Date dissolved: 22 April 1991

People and organisations
- Head of state: Václav Havel
- Head of government: Vladimír Mečiar
- No. of ministers: 18
- Ministers removed: 2
- Total no. of members: 20
- Member party: VPN; KDH; DS
- Status in legislature: Majority Grand Coalition
- Opposition party: SNS; KSS; MKDH
- Opposition leader: Víťazoslav Moric

History
- Election: 1990 Slovak parliamentary election
- Incoming formation: 1990
- Outgoing formation: 1991
- Predecessor: Čič's Cabinet
- Successor: Čarnogurský's Cabinet

Between 27 June 1990 and 22 April 1991, prime minister of Slovakia Vladimír Mečiar formed his first cabinet in his first term in this office although Ján Budaj led the elections. It was the first Slovak government formed after democratic election. On 22 April 1991, SNR parliament removed Prime Minister Vladimír Mečiar from the office and he was replaced by KDH leader Ján Čarnogurský.

== Government ministers ==
Office	Minister	Political Party	In office
Prime Minister	Vladimír Mečiar	VPN	27 June 1990 – 22 April 1991
Minister of Labour, Social Affairs and Family	Stanislav Novák	DS	27 June 1990 – 22 April 1991
Minister of Finance	Michal Kováč	VPN	27 June 1990 – 22 April 1991
Minister of Economy	Jozef Belcák	KDH	27 June 1990 – 22 April 1991
Minister of Agriculture	Michal Džatko	KDH	27 June 1990 – 22 April 1991
Minister of Interior	Anton Andráš	KDH	27 June 1990 – 22 November 1990
Minister of Interior	Ladislav Pittner	KDH	22 November 1990 – 22 April 1991
Minister of Justice	Ladislav Košťa	VPN	27 June 1990 – 22 April 1991
Minister of Education	Ladislav Kováč	VPN	27 June 1990 – 6 September 1990
Minister of Education	Ján Pišút	VPN	6 September 1990 – 22 April 1991
Minister of Culture	Ladislav Snopko	VPN	27 June 1990 – 22 April 1991
Minister of Health	Alojz Rakús	KDH	22 November 1990 – 22 April 1991
Minister of Foreign Affairs	Milan Kňažko	VPN	6 September 1990 – 22 April 1991
Minister for Administration and Privatisation of National Property	Augustín Marián Húska	VPN	27 June 1990 – 22 April 1991
Minister of Envirovment	Ivan Tirpák	KDH	27 June 1990 – 22 April 1991
Minister of Construction and Civil Engineering	Jozef Dubníček	DS	27 June 1990 – 22 April 1991
Minister of State Control	Martin Hvozdík	VPN	27 June 1990 – 22 April 1991
Minister of Industries	Ján Holčík	DS	27 June 1990 – 22 April 1991

=== Deputy Prime Ministers ===
Minister	Political Party	In office	Notes
Vladimír Ondruš	VPN	27 June 1990 – 22 April 1991	
Ján Čarnogurský	KDH	27 June 1990 – 22 April 1991	
Jozef Kučerák	VPN	27 June 1990 – 22 April 1991	
Gábor Zászlós	VPN	27 June 1990 – 22 April 1991	

== Party composition ==
Party	Ideology	Leader	Deputies	Ministers
VPN	Liberalism	Ján Budaj	48 / 150	11 / 18
KDH	Christian democracy	Ján Čarnogurský	31 / 150	6 / 18
DS	Conservatism	Ján Holčík	7 / 150	3 / 18
Total			86 / 150	20

== Issues ==
=== Conflicts and formation of HZDS ===
In 1990 the political landscape of the Czech Republic and Slovakia started to develop and many new political parties were formed, mainly from the Civic Forum and the VPN. By the end of 1990, some of Mečiar's partners in the VPN began distancing themselves from him. First, the party split into two fractions in early March 1991: Mečiar supporters (mostly members of his cabinet) and Mečiar opponents (led by the VPN chairman Fedor Gál). On 23 April 1991, the Presidium of the Slovak parliament (Slovak National Council) deposed him as Prime Minister of Slovakia and he was replaced by Ján Čarnogurský, the leader of the Christian Democratic Movement. Three days later, the VPN officially split in two: the Movement for a Democratic Slovakia (HZDS) and the remaining VPN (since October 1991 called ODÚ-VPN, later just ODÚ). Mečiar was elected as HZDS chairman in June 1991.
