= Ondrej Dostál =

Slovak politician

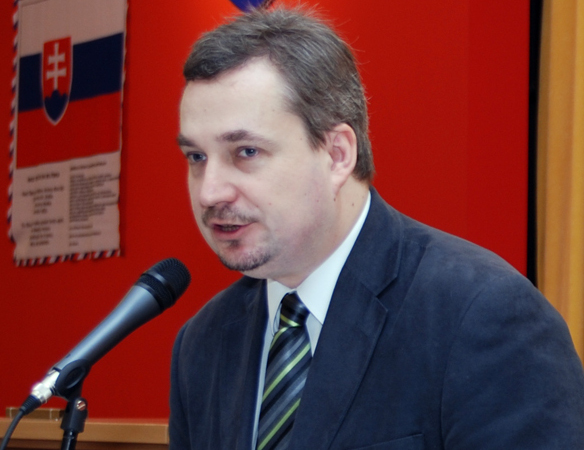

Member of the National Council of Slovakia
- Incumbent
- Assumed office 23 March 2016
- In office 8 July 2010 – 4 April 2012

Chairman of Civic Conservative Party
- Incumbent
- Assumed office 6 April 2012
- Preceded by: Peter Zajac

Personal details
- Born: 5 April 1971 (age 55) Bratislava, Czechoslovakia (now Slovakia)
- Party: Civic Conservative Party; Democratic Party
- Education: Comenius University

Ondrej Dostál (born 5 April 1971 in Bratislava) is a Slovak politician and former journalist, currently serving as member of the National Council of Slovakia in the caucus of Freedom and Solidarity and the chairman of the Civic Conservative Party.

== Early life ==
Dostál graduated from Philosophy and Sociology studies at the Comenius University in 1997. He worked as a journalist for Sme as a student. In late 2000s, Dostál later studied law at a Comenius University campus in Galanta, which was accused of allowing paying students to avoid university admission process and not having proper accreditation. He eventually graduated in 2013.

== Political career ==
Dostál was a member of the Democratic Party until 2001, after which he co-founded the Civic Conservative Party. Dostál was involved in regional and Bratislava city politics between 2002 and 2022.

In 2010, Dostál was elected to the National Council of the list of Most–Híd party. In 2016 and again in 2020, he was elected on the list of Freedom and Solidarity party. Between March and October 2022, he served as a State Secretary at the Ministry of Justice.
