= Peter Osuský =

Slovak politician (born 1953)

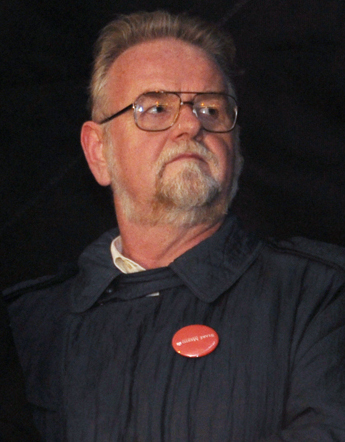

Member of the National Council
- Incumbent
- Assumed office 8 July 2010
- In office 29 October 1998 – 15 October 2002

Personal details
- Born: 11 October 1953 (age 72) Bratislava, Czechoslovakia (now Slovakia)
- Party: Democratic Party; Civic Conservative Party; Freedom and Solidarity
- Children: 4
- Education: Comenius University

Peter Osuský (born 11 October 1953 in Bratislava) is a Slovak politician, serving as the member of the National Council. In addition to being an MP, he is also a councilor in the Bratislava Old Town council, university professor and physician. Osuský is active as a co-editor of the Encyclopaedia Beliana.

Osuský was born to an intellectual Lutheran family. His grandfather was a bishop and theology professor. He studied medicine at the Comenius University, graduating in 1977. Following the graduation and compulsory military service, Osuský worked as a physician and university professor.

In the early 1990s, Osuský joined the Democratic Party. Between 1994 and 2001 served in the leadership of the party. In 1998 Slovak parliamentary election, ha gained a seat on the Slovak Democratic Coalition list.

When the Democratic Partymerged with the Slovak Democratic and Christian Union – Democratic Party, he left and co-founded the Civic Conservative Party, which he led between 2001 and 2011. In 2010, the party candidates ran on the Most–Híd list and Osuský was again elected to parliament.

In 2012, Osuský joined the Freedom and Solidarity party in rebelling against government support for European Stability Mechanism. Later that year, he left the Civic Conservative Party and became a Freedom and Solidarity member. In the 2012 Slovak parliamentary election, he again gained a seat in the National Council. Since then, has been a part of the Freedom and Solidarity caucus.

In 2014, Osuský became Freedom and Solidarity candidate in the 2014 Slovak presidential election. Nonetheless, shortly before election he withdrew his candidacy and endorsed Radoslav Procházka.

Osuský is married to a fellow doctor and has four children.
