= Civic Democratic Party (Slovakia) =

Civic Democratic Party Občianska demokratická strana
- Logo used by ODS from 1992 to 1994
- Abbreviation: ODS
- Leader: Ľudovít Kaník
- Founded: 1992
- Dissolved: 1993
- Merged into: Conservative Democratic Party
- Headquarters: Bratislava, Slovakia
- Ideology: Conservatism; Czechoslovak federalism
- Political position: Centre-right
- Colours: Blue

Civic Democratic Party (Slovak: Občianska demokratická strana, ODS) existed in Slovakia in 1992 and 1993. It was Slovak wing of Czech Civic Democratic Party. It was led by Ľudovít Kaník, with Iveta Radičová as its Press spokesperson. Václav Klaus formed Slovak ODS to prevent Dissolution of Czechoslovakia.

== History ==
In December 1991, the Czech Civic Democratic Party started to organise in Slovakia. The Slovak ODS was officially registered on 5 February 1992. Ľudovít Kaník became the leader of Slovak ODS. Strong influence had Iveta Radičová who was party's Press spokesperson. The Slovak ODS agreed to form a coalition with the Democratic Party, and also entered talks with the Civic Democratic Union (ODÚ) about a possible alliance, which were unsuccessful. ODS and ODÚ became rivals. The coalition of ODS and the Democratic Party ran in the 1992 parliamentary elections but failed to win any seats, which, along with the split of Czechoslovakia, led to the dissolution of Slovak ODS. In May 1993, its members established a new party called the Conservative Democratic Party (Slovak: Konzervatívna demokratická strana, KDS), whose chairman was Pavel Hagyari. KDS existed only a few months, before merging into the Democratic Party in March 1994.

== Election results ==
Year	Vote	Vote %	Seats	Place	Notes	Position
1992	102,058	3.3	0 / 150	8th	Participated in coalition with Democratic Party	extra-parliamentary
