= Jan Mühlfeit =

Czech manager

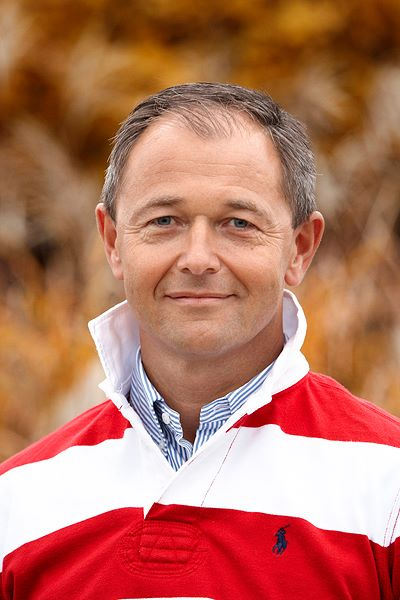
- Jan Mühlfeit
- Born: January 8, 1962 (age 64); Jihlava, Czech Republic
- Website: www.janmuhlfeit.com

Jan Mühlfeit (born January 8, 1962) is a Czech manager, global strategist, coach and mentor. He spent almost 22 years working for Microsoft, the last 15 of which were in top management. His last post before he left in 2014 was Chairman Europe of the Microsoft Corporation, a position he held from 2007. He acts as an advisor to a number of governmental and international organisations, such as AIESEC, the World Economic Forum, the European Commission, and the OECD.

== Biography ==
Mühlfeit was born on January 8, 1962, in Jihlava, Czech Republic. In 1986 he graduated from the Faculty of Electrical Engineering of the Czech Technical University in Prague with a degree in Information Technology.

During the era of the Czechoslovak Socialist Republic, before the Velvet Revolution, he worked in the scientific and technical intelligence service (First National Security Corps under State Security) and used the cover name Masopust (Carnival). In July 1989 he was promoted to senior officer. In 1990 he passed an evaluation by the screening commissions and, as a person with integrity, was recommended for further service with the Ministry of the Interior. The minister at the time, Ján Langoš, promoted Mühlfeit to First Lieutenant in 1991. Then, in 1991, he left to join the Czech software company Software602, where he served as International Sales and Marketing Director.

== Microsoft ==
He joined Microsoft in 1993 as Marketing Director. From February 1, 1998, until 2000 he worked for Microsoft as the Managing Director and CEO of the Czech branch. One controversial incident from his time there is the Mironet vs. Microsoft case, which concerns breach of copyright. According to the Mironet management, Mühlfeit, together with Czech Microsoft Sales Director Vladimír Smutný, allegedly influenced an investigation into Mironet's efforts in 1999 to sell computers without Microsoft Windows 98 pre-installed as the operating system.

Thanks to his sales results, in 2000 Mühlfeit became the director for the whole of the Central and Eastern Europe region and a member of the company's top management worldwide. On August 19, 2002, he was appointed vice-chairman for Europe, the Middle East and Africa (EMEA). Under his leadership, the CEE region, for which he was directly responsible, remained top in the Microsoft worldwide rankings for four years. From 2005 to 2006 he was vice-chairman for public administration in the region (EMEA) and was later appointed Chairman Europe of the Microsoft Corporation, a position he held until he left at the end of 2014. Mühlfeit was involved in formulating Microsoft's global strategies for the emerging markets and served as advisor to many governmental organisations and NGOs in the region (EMEA). During this time he represented his firm in dealings with the governments of the various European countries, key European institutions and the firm's biggest corporate clients and trading partners.

== Awards and public activities ==
Mühlfeit has received numerous awards, including:

- In recognition of his work, in 1994 Microsoft awarded him the prestigious "Presidential Award for Excellence".
- Thrice he has won the title "Czech Computer Science Personality of the Year", awarded at the Invex international trade fair – 1994, 1999, 2002.
- In the same year he was declared Personality of the Year by the Profit weekly journal.
- In 1996 he came top in a poll entitled Most Visible Personalities in Information Technology.
- "Czech Republic Best Manager in 1999", awarded by the Czech Prime Minister.
- "Czech Brain", awarded by the Czech Minister of Foreign Affairs.
- In 1999 he became a member of the international CRT association (Caux Round Table – the proposal to enrol him was filed by the administrative board of the Pangea Foundation at the request of the Caux Round Table secretariat in the Netherlands – Mühlfeit is the only representative of the Czech Republic in this organisation).

He continues to support a number of charitable projects, including "Computers Against Barriers", which is a joint initiative launched by Microsoft Czech Republic and Czech NGOs. In addition, he is on the supervisory board of the Charta 77 foundation. He has been a member of the board of directors of the European Academy of Business in Society (EABiS) and Junior Achievement Young Enterprise Europe (JAYE). He is still a member of the administrative board of AIESEC (Association Internationale des Etudiants en Sciences Economiques et Commerciales – a non-political, non-profit organisation fully run by international students).

During his career he has also appeared as a guest on global talk shows on CNN, CNBC, Bloomberg, Euronews, and has provided a series of interviews for prestigious media such as The New York Times, The Washington Post, the Financial Times, and La Tribune.
