= Pierre et Luce =

1920 novel by Romain Rolland

Pierre and Luce
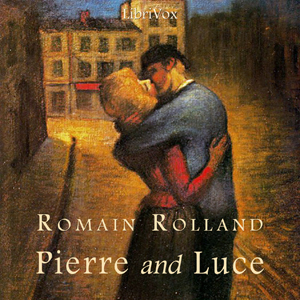
- Cover of LibriVox edition (2010)
- Author: Romain Rolland
- Original title: Pierre et Luce
- Translator: Charles DeKay
- Language: French
- Genre: Novel
- Publication date: 1920
- Publication place: France
- English publication date: 1922
- Media type: Print
- Pages: 136 pp (first English edition, hardcover)

Pierre et Luce is a 1920 novel by the Nobel Prize-winning French author Romain Rolland. It focuses on the impact of the First World War on two lovers, Pierre and Luce. The older brother of Pierre is off fighting on the Western Front. The novel also seems to depict the Paris Gun attack on the St-Gervais-et-St-Protais Church.

== Influences ==
Slovak composer Miro Bázlik wrote an opera "Peter a Lucia" in seven pictures between 1963 and 1966, based on Rolland's novel. Premiered in 1967 at the Slovak National Theatre, further renditions coming in 2022.

The 1968 Czechoslovak film adaptation starring Emília Vášáryová as Luce and Emil Horváth as Pierre.

Slovak progressive-rock musicians Dežo Ursiny and Jaro Filip recorded a demo in the 1970s with a set of songs for poems, written by Ján Štrasser, based on the novel. Due to other duties, they could not transform the demo songs into an intended musical until their deaths in 1995 and 2000 (resp.). Years later, Alta Vášová, author of the libretto for the musical, finally found a group of musicians, Talent Transport, with a skilled composer and arranger, Vladislav "Slnko" Šarišský, who succeeded in transforming the demo recording into complete arrangements for the intended songs while nicely pertaining to the minimalist musical style of their original authors. Accompanied by Jakub Ursiny, son of Dežo Ursiny, as Pierre, and Dorota Nvotová, daughter of Jaro Filip, as Luce, on vocals, Talent Transport recorded a studio recording named P+L with the arranged songs.

The German punk band Die Skeptiker wrote a song "Pierre und Luce" based on the novel.

== Editions ==
- Pierre and Luce, Ellicott City, MD: Mondial, 2007, paperback, ISBN 1-59569-060-3
- Pierre and Luce, London: Onesuch Press, 2011, paperback, ISBN 978-0987153258

== See also ==
- John Singer Sargent
- Paris Gun
- St-Gervais-et-St-Protais Church
