= 2010 Slovak political reform referendum =

Slovak political reform referendum in 2010

A referendum on political reform was held in Slovakia on 18 September 2010, following a successful petition started as a civil activity along with the foundation of Freedom and Solidarity (SaS). the referendum failed to meet the turnout threshold required under the constitution of slovakia, with only 22.8% of the electorate voting—far below the 50% required. large majorities voted in favour of all six proposals, with between 70% and 95% supporting each proposal.

== Background ==
The referendum was the initiative of SaS's leaders, who had promoted the campaign as "Referendum 2009". Its organizers aimed to hold the referendum at the same time as the first election SaS was contesting, the June 2009 European parliament election. A second target period was late May, during municipal elections in Slovakia. However, the referendum was ultimately held the following year.

== Referendum ==
Then Slovak president Ivan Gašparovič set the date for the referendum after SaS collected 401,126 signatures for it, 386,000 of which were found to be valid. The referendum asked six questions:

- to abolish the television licence (question 1);
- to limit parliamentary immunity (question 2);
- to lower the number of MPs from 150 to 100 by 2014 (question 3);
- to set a maximum price for limousines used by the government at €40,000 (question 4);
- to introduce electronic voting via the internet (question 5); and
- to change the Press Code by removing politicians' automatic right of reply (question 6).

The latter four demands had already been included in the new coalition agreement of the government formed after the 2010 parliamentary election, which included SaS.

== Results ==
All six proposals were approved by a supermajority of those who voted; however, a turnout of 50% or more was required for the referendum to be valid. Only 22.8% of voters cast a ballot for the referendum, rendering it invalid. Only one referendum in Slovak history has ever crossed the threshold: the 2003 vote on EU membership (51.5% turnout).

Question 1
Choice	Votes	%
For	870,864	90.63
Against	90,058	9.37
Total	960,922	100.00
Valid votes	960,922	96.27
Invalid/blank votes	37,220	3.73
Total votes	998,142	100.00
Registered voters/turnout	4,369,553	22.84
Turnout needed		50.00

Question 2
Choice	Votes	%
For	952,281	98.21
Against	17,333	1.79
Total	969,614	100.00
Valid votes	969,614	97.14
Invalid/blank votes	28,528	2.86
Total votes	998,142	100.00
Registered voters/turnout	4,369,553	22.84
Turnout needed		50.00

Question 3
Choice	Votes	%
For	925,888	96.01
Against	38,450	3.99
Total	964,338	100.00
Valid votes	964,338	96.61
Invalid/blank votes	33,804	3.39
Total votes	998,142	100.00
Registered voters/turnout	4,369,553	22.84
Turnout needed		50.00

Question 4
Choice	Votes	%
For	886,767	93.51
Against	61,532	6.49
Total	948,299	100.00
Valid votes	948,299	95.01
Invalid/blank votes	49,843	4.99
Total votes	998,142	100.00
Registered voters/turnout	4,369,553	22.84
Turnout needed		50.00

Question 5
Choice	Votes	%
For	703,336	76.02
Against	221,847	23.98
Total	925,183	100.00
Valid votes	925,183	92.69
Invalid/blank votes	72,959	7.31
Total votes	998,142	100.00
Registered voters/turnout	4,369,553	22.84
Turnout needed		50.00

Question 6
Choice	Votes	%
For	747,983	84.79
Against	134,163	15.21
Total	882,146	100.00
Valid votes	882,146	88.38
Invalid/blank votes	115,996	11.62
Total votes	998,142	100.00
Registered voters/turnout	4,369,553	22.84
Turnout needed		50.00
