= 2009 Slovak regional elections =

Elections were held in Slovakia's eight self-governing regions on 14 November 2009, at a cost of over €8.4 million.

Six of the regional presidencies were won by centre-left Direction – Social Democracy (Smer), with one being won by Smer's national conservative allies, the People's Party – Movement for a Democratic Slovakia (ĽS-HZDS). Bratislava was won by the centre-right Slovak Democratic and Christian Union – Democratic Party, having previously been held by ĽS-HZDS-backed Vladimír Bajan

== Results ==
=== Presidencies ===
Region	Winner	Party	Endorsing parties
Bratislava	Pavol Frešo	SDKÚ-DS	KDH, SMK, OKS, SaS
Trnava	Tibor Mikuš	Smer	ND, SNS, SZ
Trenčín	Pavol Sedláček	ĽS-HZDS	Smer, SNS
Nitra	Milan Belica	Smer	SDKÚ-DS, KDH
Žilina	Juraj Blanár	Smer	SNS, ĽS-HZDS, SZ, SF
Banská Bystrica	Vladimír Maňka	Smer	ĽS-HZDS
Prešov	Peter Chudík	Smer	ĽS-HZDS, HZD, SZS
Košice	Zdenko Trebuľa	Smer	SMK, ĽS-HZDS, SF, HZD, SOS, Most–Híd, Liga

=== Councils ===
Party	Bratislava	Trnava	Trenčín	Nitra	Žilina	Banská Bystrica	Prešov	Košice	Total	%
Smer	13	4	20	15	16	20	21	26	135 / 408	33.1
SDKÚ-DS	10	3	5	9	4	4	15	7	57 / 408	14.0
KDH	8	8	3	7	13	2	10	–	51 / 408	12.5
SMK	5	11	–	13	–	7	–	4	40 / 408	9.8
ĽS-HZDS	1	3	7	7	5	7	5	4	39 / 408	9.6
SNS	–	1	–	–	6	2	–	–	9 / 408	2.2
HZD	–	2	–	–	–	1	1	–	4 / 408	1.0
OKS	3	–	–	–	1	–	–	–	4 / 408	1.0
Most–Híd	1	1	–	–	–	–	–	–	2 / 408	0.5
SF	–	–	–	–	–	–	1	1	2 / 408	0.5
Other parties	1	1	–	–	1	1	3	2	9 / 408	2.2
Independents	2	6	10	3	11	5	6	13	56 / 408	13.7
Total	44	40	45	54	57	49	62	57	408	100

Nine further parties won one seat each.
