= József Nagy (politician) =

Slovak economist and politician

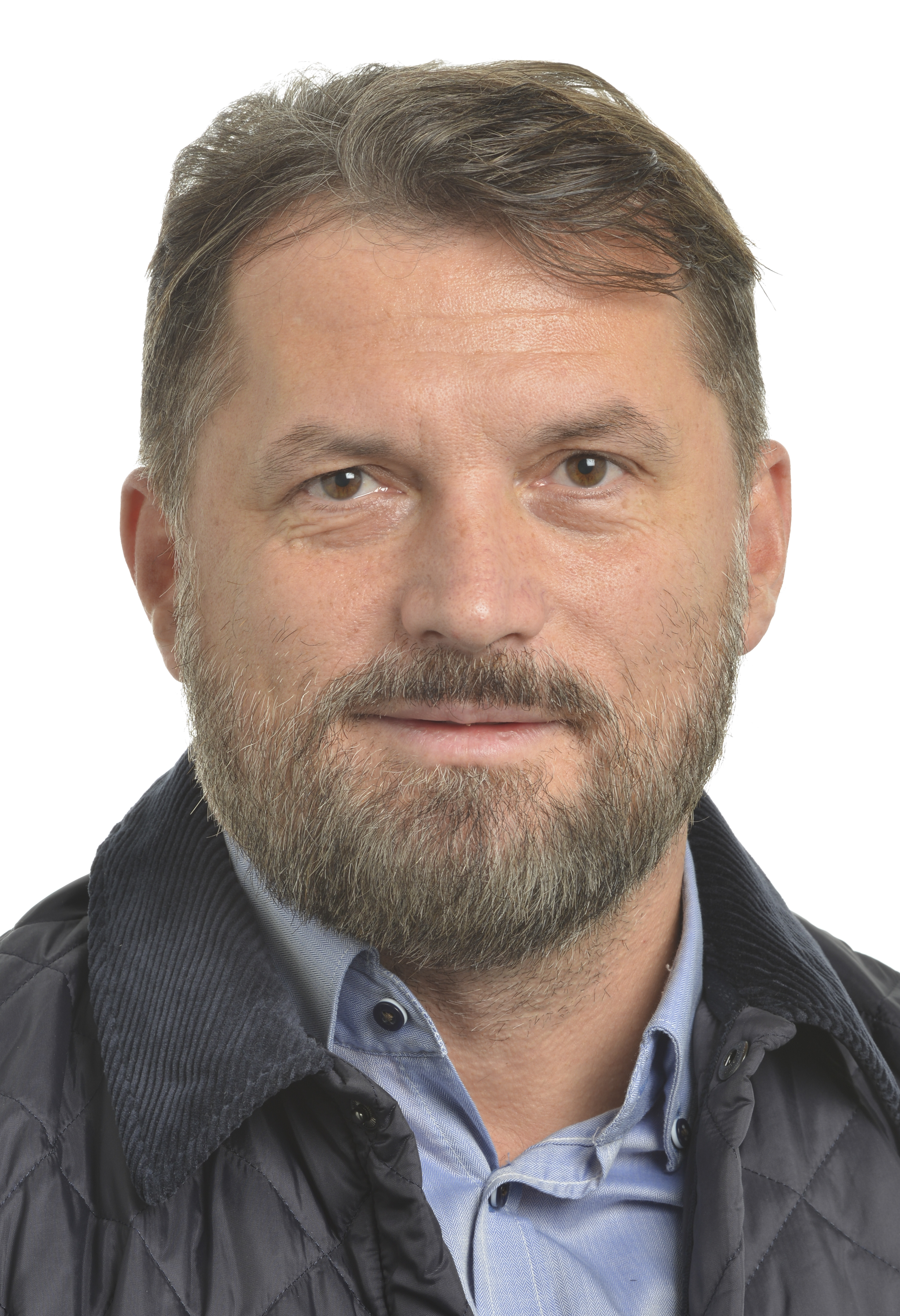

Minister of the Environment of Slovakia
- In office 2 November 2010 – 4 April 2012
- Preceded by: Jozef Medveď
- Succeeded by: Peter Žiga

Member of the European Parliament
- In office 1 July 2014 – 1 July 2019

Personal details
- Born: 11 March 1968 (age 58) Dunajská Streda, Czechoslovakia
- Party: Most–Híd
- Education: University of Economics in Bratislava
- Profession: Politician, Economist

József Nagy (born 11 March 1968) is a Slovak economist and politician. From 2010, he was briefly a member of the National Council of Slovakia, and later the Minister of the Environment. In the 2012 parliamentary elections, he ran for office on the Most–Híd candidate list, placed 14th. From 2014 to 2019, he served as a Member of the European Parliament.

== Early life ==
József Nagy was born on born 11 March 1968 in Dunajská Streda. He graduated from the University of Economics in Bratislava.

== Career ==
He worked as the director of Dunstav in Dunajská Streda, 4P publications, Therma, and as the chairman of the board at Agrostav Komárno and Therma.

=== Political career ===
After the 2010 parliamentary elections, he became a member of the National Council of Slovakia for the party Most–Híd. He resigned his mandate due to incompatibility of functions when he served as State Secretary at the Ministry of Agriculture.

In November 2010, Nagy was appointed Minister of the Environment following the re-establishment of the ministry as a separate entity from the Ministry of Agriculture.

József Nagy identified flood control measures as his priority. He stated that he would attempt to obtain an additional payment of 15 million euros for the sale of emissions quotas from Interblue Group, which was carried out by his predecessor Ján Chrbet.

As minister, he advocated for the so-called green tripartite, a collaboration between non-governmental organizations and municipalities to operate within the ministry's agenda.

In the regional elections in 2013, he ran for the regional council and received 8,794 votes.

He was subsequently elected as a Member of the European Parliament in 2014 and served until 2019.

== See also ==
- 2014 European Parliament election in Slovakia
