= Conservative Democratic Party (Slovakia) =

Conservative Democratic Party Konzervatívno demokratická strana
- Leader: Pavel Hagyari
- Founded: May 1993
- Dissolved: March 1994
- Merger of: Party of Conservative Democrats; Civic Democratic Party
- Merged into: Democratic Party
- Ideology: Conservatism
- Political position: Centre-right
- Colours: Blue

Conservative Democratic Party (Slovak: Konzervatívno demokratická strana, KDS) existed in Slovakia in 1993 and 1994. It was merger of Party of Conservative Democrats and Civic Democratic Party. It was led by Pavel Hagyari. In March 1994, party merged into Democratic Party.
