= František Šebej =

Slovak politician and academic

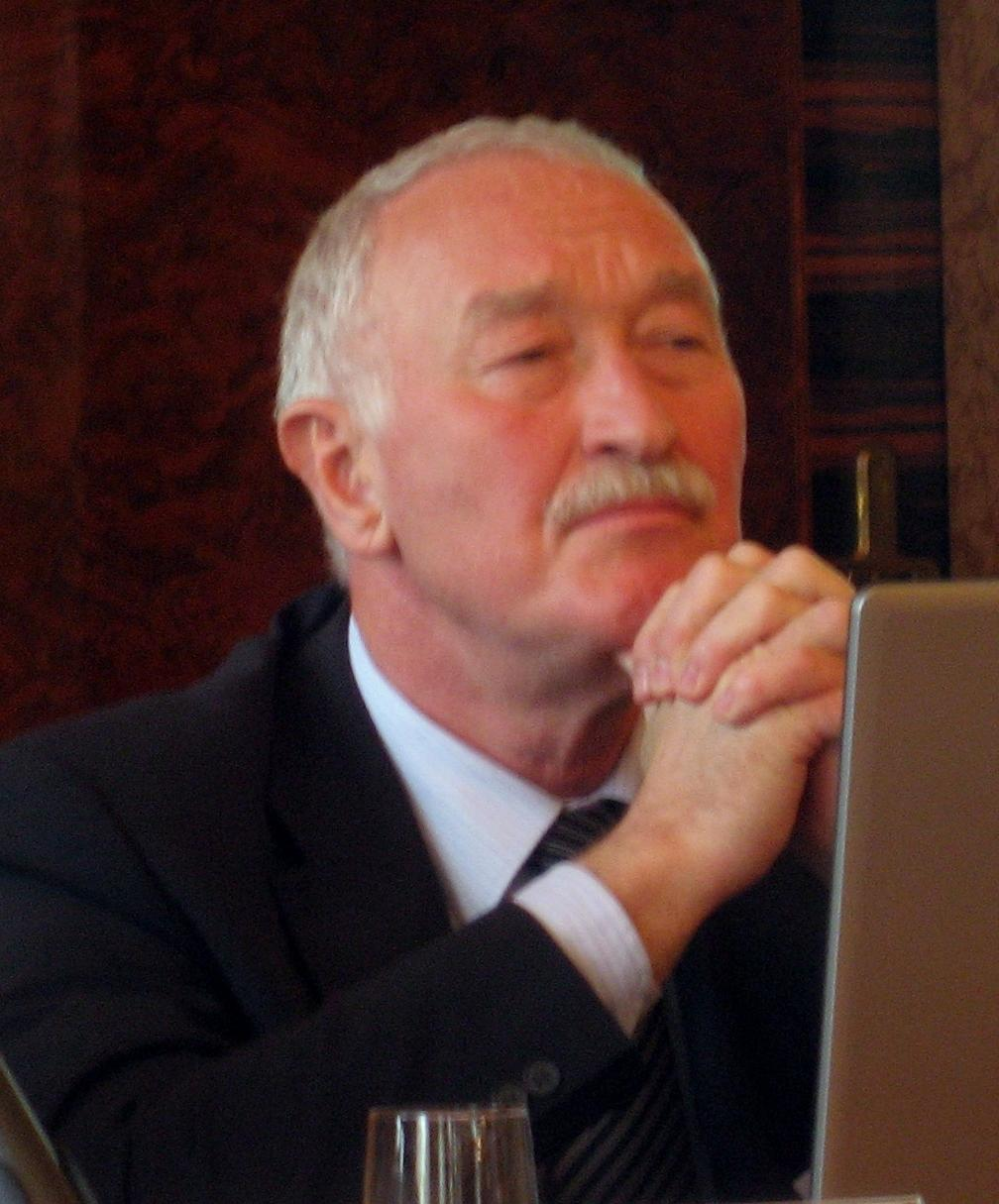

Member of the National Council
- In office 2010 – 15 March 2018
- In office 1998–2002

Member of the House of the Nation of the Federal Assembly of Czechoslovakia
- In office 7 June 1990 – 4 June 1992

Personal details
- Born: 11 May 1947 (age 77); Bratislava, Czechoslovakia
- Political party: Most–Híd (since 2010)

František Šebej (born 11 May 1947) is a Slovak politician and academic. He was member of the National Council of Slovakia between 1998 and 2002 and once more from 2010 until 2018. Between 1990 and 1992 he was member of the House of the Nation of the Federal Assembly of Czechoslovakia.

== Career ==
Šebej was born on 11 May 1947 in Bratislava. He worked at the Comenius University in Bratislava as a researcher at the Institute of Human Bioclimathology and Institute of Experimental psychology between 1971 and 1980.

Šebej was a member of the House of Nations of the Federal Assembly of Czechoslovakia between 7 June 1990 and 4 June 1992. He served first for the Public Against Violence (VPN) party from 26 September 1990 until 12 November 1991. Then for a combination of the VPN and the Civic Democratic Union between 3 December 1991 and 10 March 1992 and finally solely for the Civic Democratic Union until the end of his term. In 1995 he criticized the government of Slovak Prime Minister Vladimír Mečiar, saying the state was becoming more and more authoritarian.

Between 1998 and 2002 Šebej was member of the National Council of Slovakia. In 2010 he again became member of the National Council, being elected for Most–Híd in the 2010 Slovak parliamentary election. In the parliamentary elections of 2012 he was elected once again for Most–Híd. As of 2015 he chaired the Foreign Affairs committee in the National Council, he has done so since 2010.

In April 2014, during the Russo-Ukrainian war he disagreed with Slovak government policy on defence of Slovakia. He called for increased security efforts, including the possibility of stationing NATO troops in the country. On 15 March 2018 Šebej resigned from his seat in the National Council.

Šebej is member of the board of the Slovak Foreign Policy Association.

== Honors ==
- Order of the Rising Sun, 2nd Class, Gold and Silver Star (2017)
