= Ján Oravec =

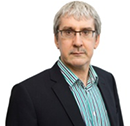

Economist

Personal details
- Born: 6 June 1964 (age 62) Senica, Czechoslovakia (now Slovakia)
- Education: Comenius University
- Profession: Economist
- Website: janoravec.sk

Ján Oravec (born 6 June 1964, in Senica) is a Slovak economist and former member of the National Council of Slovakia. He was among the members of the National Council of Slovakia between 2020 and 2023.

Oravec ran as a candidate for the Freedom and Solidarity party at the European Parliament elections in 2009 and 2014. He was one of two new Freedom and Solidarity deputies elected at the 2020 Slovak parliamentary election.

== External sources ==
- Reference from Latvia journal
- Jan Oravec about entrepreneurs in Slovakia
- Interview with Jan Oravec
