= Peter Zajac =

Slovak literary critic and politician

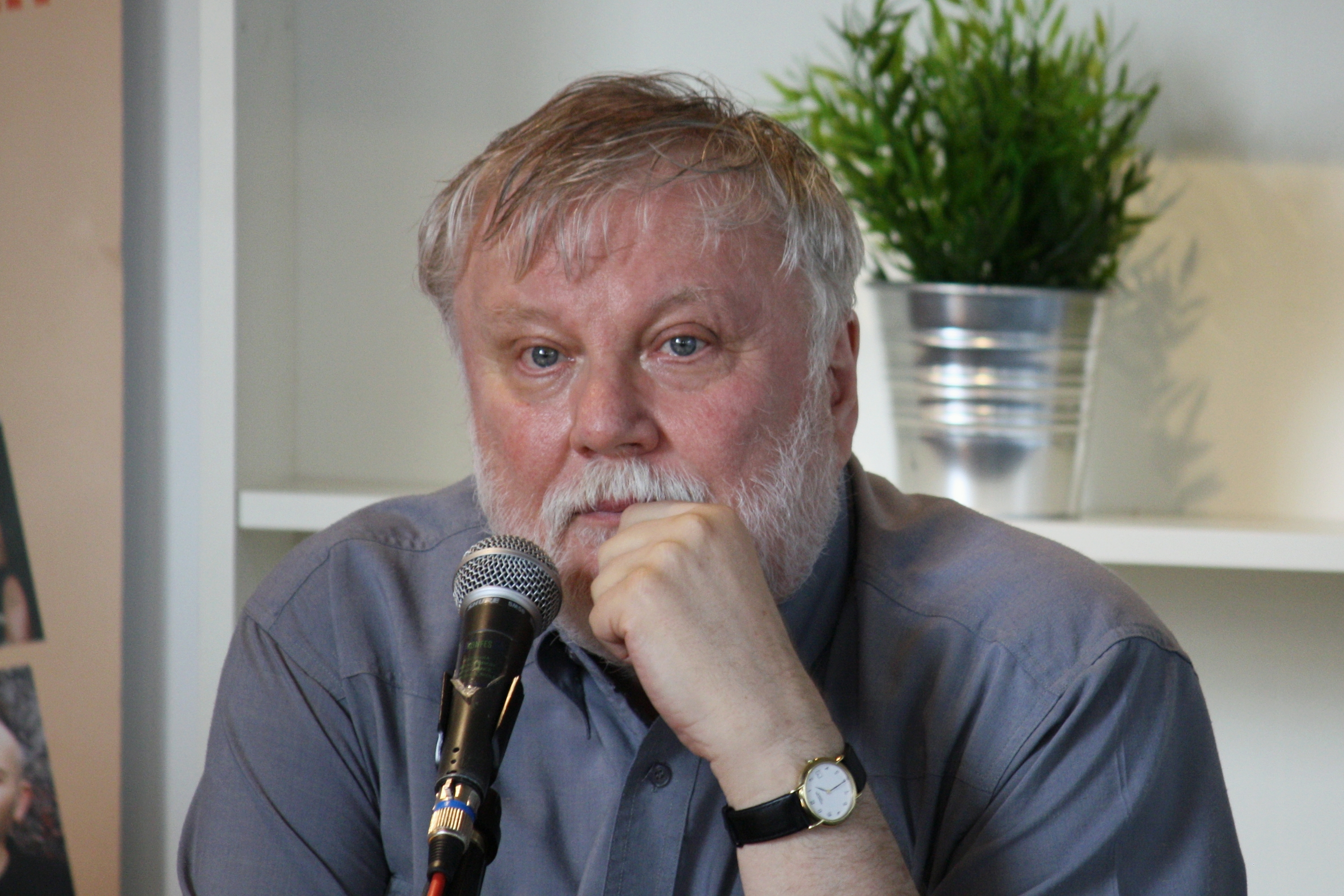

Member of the National Council
- In office 1998–2001
- In office 2010–2012

Personal details
- Born: 3 February 1946 (age 80) Bratislava, Czechoslovakia
- Party: Public Against Violence; Democratic Party, Civic Conservative Party
- Spouse: Alta Vášová
- Children: 2
- Education: Comenius University; University of Tübingen

Peter Zajac (born 3 February 1946) is a Slovak literary critic and politician who served as an MP of the National Council between 1998 and 2001 and again between 2010 and 2012. He is married to the science fiction writer Alta Vášová. In 2020 president Zuzana Čaputová awarded Peter Zajac Ľudovít Štúr Order, 1st class.

== Early life ==
Peter Zajac father was a theoretical physicist and his mother was a gynaecologist. He studied Slovak and German language at the Comenius University and at the University of Tübingen, graduating in 1968. Between 1968 and 1989 he worked as Faculty at the Constantine the Philosopher University in Nitra. He is currently active as a researcher at the Slovak Academy of Sciences and Professor Emeritus at the Humboldt University of Berlin.

Between 1990 and 1991, Zajac served as the first Chairman of the Slovak chapter of PEN International.

== Political career ==
Zajac is a Founding Member of the Public Against Violence party. Between 1995 and 1999, he was a member of the Democratic Party, which was in 1998 incorporated in Slovak Democratic Coalition. Between 1998 and 2001 he was an MP of the National Council in the Slovak Democratic Coalition caucus. In 2001, he became a founding member of the Civic Conservative Party, serving as its chairman between 2007 and 2012. On 2010, the Civic Conservative Party ran on the Most–Híd party list. Zajac was again elected an MP, serving until the 2012 Slovak parliamentary election.
