= Jana Bittó Cigániková =

Slovak politician (born 1983)

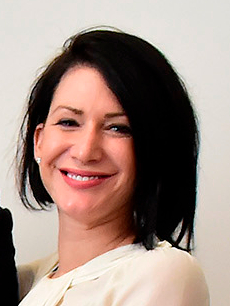

Member of the National Council
- Incumbent
- Assumed office 23 March 2016

Personal details
- Born: 15 September 1983 (age 42) Bratislava, Czechoslovakia
- Party: Freedom and Solidarity (until 2026); Independent (2026-)
- Spouse: Daniel Bittó
- Children: 2
- Education: School of Economics and Management in Public Administration in Bratislava

Jana Bittó Cigániková (née Jana Cigániková, born 15 September 1983) is a Slovak politician, serving as an MP of the National Council since 2016. She was a member of the Freedom and Solidarity (SaS) party until April 2026.

== Early life ==
Cigániková studied Public Administration at the School of Economics and Management in Public Administration in Bratislava and Healthcare Management at the Central European Management Institute in Prague, graduating in 2018. She established a network of private kindergartens called Happy in 2009.

== Political career ==
Cigániková gained an MP seat in the National Council in the 2016 and 2020 parliamentary elections, focusing on Healthcare and Abortion rights. In September 2022, she filed charges against fellow MP, Romana Tabak, accusing her of assault in a nightclub. The police rejected the criminal charge, but issued a 30 euro fine to Tabak for a misdemeanor.

In April 2026, Cigániková was expelled from SaS, with the party citing her long-standing criticism against it.

== Personal life ==
Cigániková married former reality show contestant Daniel Bittó in 2020. She has two sons from her previous marriage.
