= Peter Tatár =

Slovak politician

Peter Tatár (born September 10, 1953) became in 1990 a member of the Slovak National Council, i.e. Slovak parliament. He was reelected in 1998–2002 term. He was leader of the Civic Conservative Party from 2001 until 2006.
