= Alojz Hlina =

Slovak politician

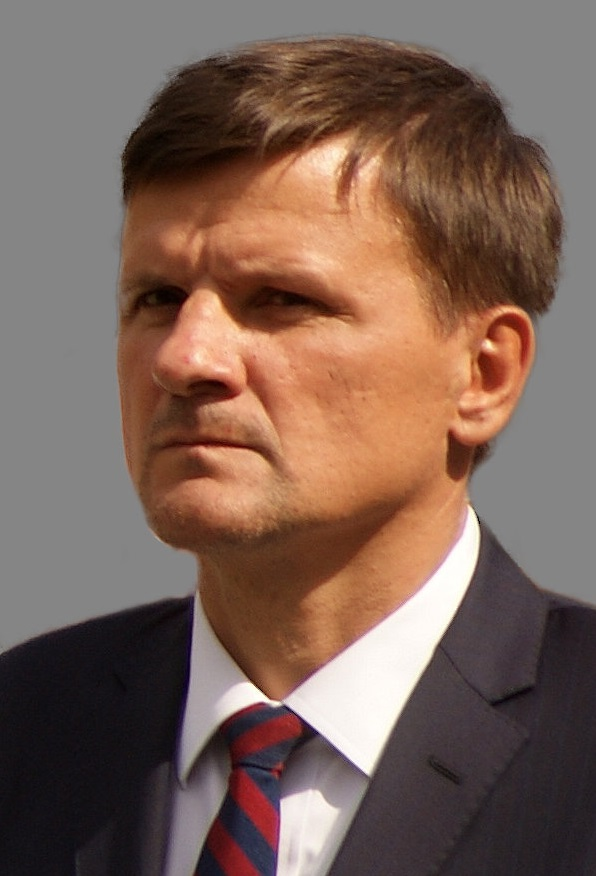
- Born: 22 October 1970 (age 54); Liptovský Mikuláš, Czechoslovakia (now Slovakia)
- Occupations: politician; businessman
- Known for: independent member of National Council; former chairman of KDH

Alojz Hlina (born 22 October 1970) is a Slovak businessman and politician. He is an independent member of National Council elected through SASKA list. Hlina was also a member from 2012 to 2014 independent from OL'aNO list and was chairman of KDH from 2016 to 2020.

== Early life and education ==
Hlina began studying at Slovak University of Agriculture in Nitra. After the Velvet Revolution, he became the first manager of the Slovak University Union. Hlina later engaged in business in the field of gastronomy.

== Political career ==
Between 1998 and 2005, Hlina was a statutory member of the SMD, occasionally organised protest actions on current topics with his fellow members.

Hlina was elected member of National Council during the 2012 Slovak parliamentary election. He ran for the position from the ninth place candidate of the OĽaNO party as a manager, farmer, and activist. However, the same year in October, Hlina resigned from the parliamentary club and worked as an unclassified deputy. On 2 September 2014, he became a member of the Citizens of Slovakia party.

=== Christian Democratic Movement ===
Hlina joined Christian Democratic Movement in 2015 and finished 70th place during the parliamentary elections one year later. However, the movement did not make it to the parliament for the first time.

In June 2016, Hlina became chairman of KDH, receiving 220 votes at the party congress. Two years later, he defended his position when he received 233 votes against Richard Vašečka's 101 votes. Hlina resigned from the position of party chairman on 2 March 2020 after KDH was eliminated the parliamentary elections, when it only received 4.65% votes and did not advance to the Slovak National Council.

=== Civic activist ===
On 31 August 2012, Hlina brought a historic Soviet tank to the villa where Vasil Biľak lived. He alluded to Biľak's signature on said invitation letter, which is related to the entry of Warsaw Pact troops into their territory on 21 August 1968.

On 15 September 2015, Pohotovosť started to build a wall in front of the non-bank company in Bratislava. According to his lawyer, Hlina acted according to the institute of extreme emergency, in which there is no criminal liability. However, the police detained him on the spot and accused him of the criminal act of "unauthorized interference with the right to a house, apartment, and non-residential space in conjunction with the crime of restricting personal freedom." Later, Hlina accused the General Prosecutor Office for being prosecuted.

== Personal life ==
Hlina is married to his wife, Martina, with two daughters. Hlina is Roman Catholic.
