= Ján Langoš =

Slovak politician (1946–2006)

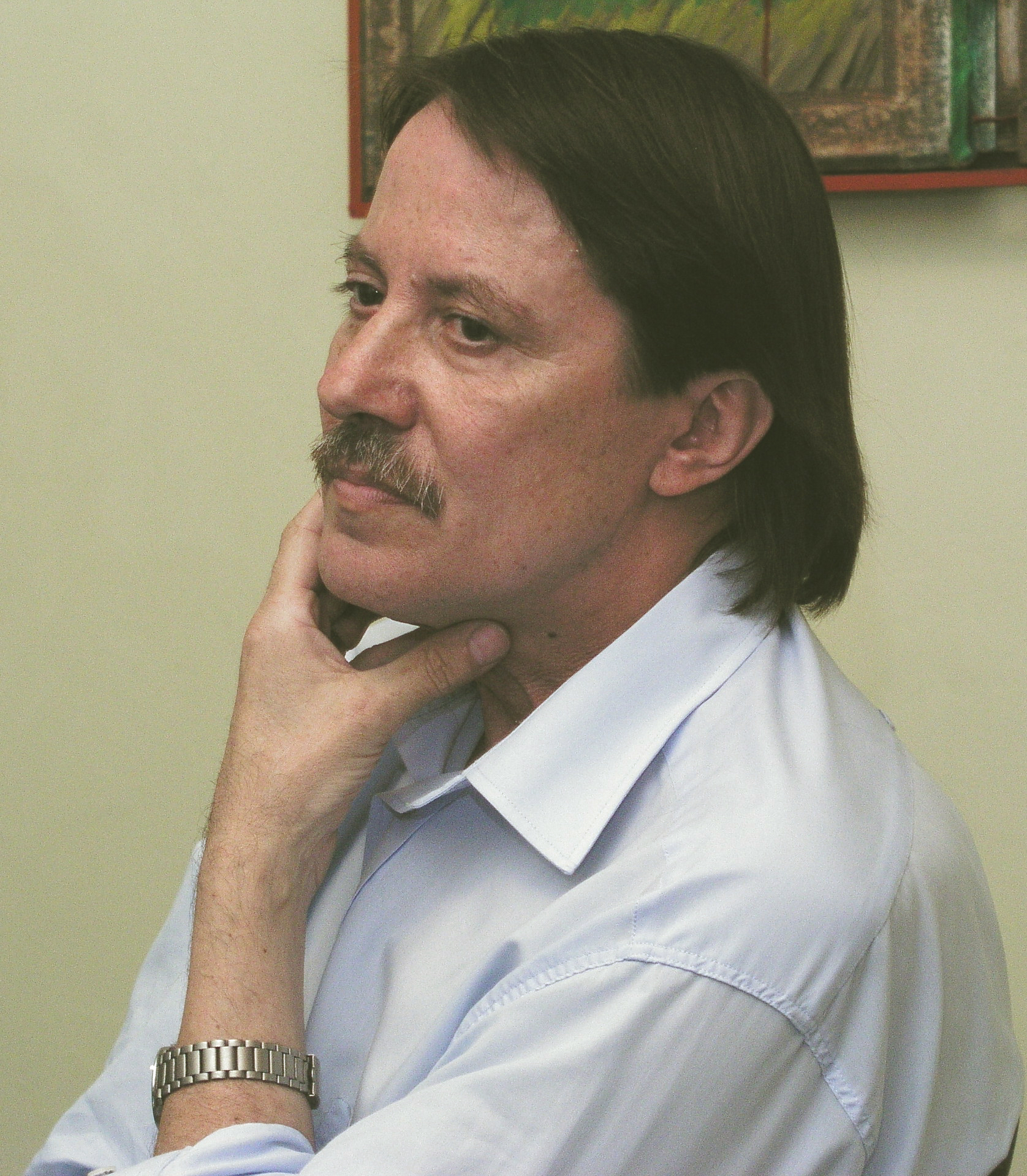
Ján Langoš

Ján Langoš (2 August 1946 in Banská Bystrica – 15 June 2006 in Drienovec) was a Slovak politician associated with the Slovakia Democratic Party.

He was one of the key dissidents during the era of Communist Czechoslovakia. He served as a minister at Department of Home Affairs (1990–1992) of former Czech and Slovak Federative Republic, appointed by president Václav Havel. After the dissolution of Czechoslovakia he was a member of Parliament and established the Democratic Party. After many years of conviction he succeeded in establishing the National Memory Institute. After finding documentations of crimes of several influential people and trying to open these to the public, he died in a suspicious car accident.

The 14th Dalai Lama of Tibet was awarded the Ján Langoš Human Rights award in Bratislava, Slovakia by Jan Langos Foundation on 9 September 2009. The Foundation was established by his wife, Gabriela Langošová and his two daughters, Nina and Bipula.
