= Alta Vášová =

Slovak writer

- Born: 27 May 1939 (age 87); Nagyszőlős, Hungary (now Vynohradiv, Ukraine)
- Education: Comenius University
- Occupation: Writer
- Spouse(s): Dimitrij Jurkovič; Peter Zajac
- Children: 4
- Writing career
- Language: Slovak
- Genres: Sci-fi, children tales, Television and Movie scripts

Alta Vášová (born 27 May 1939 in Nagyszőlős) in a Slovak sci-fi writer, film and television writer and child stories author.

== Life ==
Vášová studied Mathematics and Physics Teaching at the Comenius University (then called Higher School of Pedagogy in Bratislava). In addition to writing, she worked as writer in Koliba, Bratislava and Barrandov, Prague. She also worked as a cleaner and guide at the Zvíkov Castle. Between 1968 - 1973 she was a dramaturgist at the Slovak Public Television.

Vášová lives in Bratislava. She was formerly married to the architect Dimitrij Jurkovič. The marriage resulted in twins Ilja and Dušan. Her second husband is the literature critic Peter Zajac with whom she has twins Marek and Matúš.

== Works ==
Vášová published in literature magazines Mladá Tvorba, Romboid and Slovenské rozhľady. She focuses on civilizational, ecological, biographic and sci-fi genres as well as relationships between children and parents. She received Anasoft litera prize for her 2008 novel Ostrovy nepamäti (Islands of unmemory) and Dominik Tatarka prize for 2019 novel Odlety (Departures). In 2018, the president of Slovakia Andrej Kiska awarded her the Order of Ľudovít Štúr, 2nd class.

She wrote the script of the popular television fairy tale Neberte nám princeznú (Let the Princess Stay with Us).
