= Freedom and Solidarity =

Centre-right liberal political party in Slovakia

Freedom and Solidarity Sloboda a Solidarita
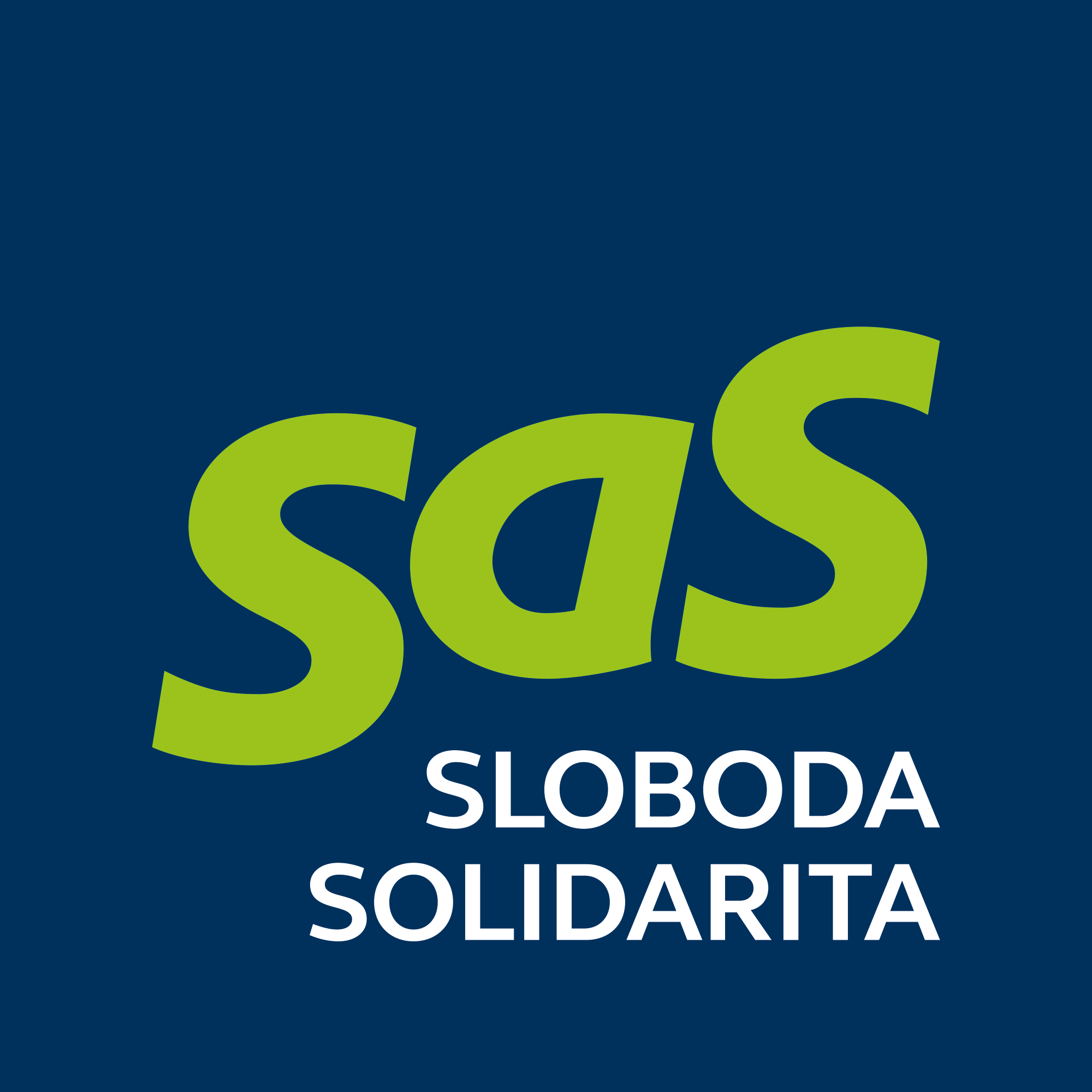
- Abbreviation: SaS
- Chair: Branislav Gröhling
- Vice Chairs: See list: Juraj Droba; Mária Kolíková; Marián Viskupič
- General Manager: Roman Foltin
- Founder: Richard Sulík
- Founded: 28 February 2009; 17 years ago
- Headquarters: Priemyselná 8, 821 09 Bratislava
- Newspaper: SaS Daily
- Youth wing: Mladí SaSkári
- Membership (2022): ▲250
- Ideology: Right-libertarianism; Classical liberalism Conservative liberalism
- Political position: Centre-right
- European affiliation: European Conservatives and Reformists Party
- European Parliament group: ALDE Group (2014); ECR Group (2014–2024)
- Colours: Green; Dark blue
- Slogan: Vote strong economy (2023)
- National Council: 10 / 150
- European Parliament: 0 / 15
- Regional governors: 1 / 8
- Regional deputies (Note: Also with coalitions): 81 / 419
- Mayors (Note: Also with coalitions): 47 / 2,904
- Local councillors (Note: Also with coalitions): 619 / 20,462

Website
- sas.sk
- Politics of Slovakia; Political parties; Elections; A: The party has been described as centrist by some and as right-wing by others.

Freedom and Solidarity (Slovak: Sloboda a Solidarita, SaS), also called Saska, is a centre-right libertarian political party in Slovakia. Established in 2009, SaS was founded by economist Richard Sulík, who designed Slovakia's flat tax system. It generally holds anti-state and neoliberal positions. It is led by businessman Branislav Gröhling.

SaS is a soft Eurosceptic party, and demands reforms of the European Union (EU) but declares that membership in the EU is key for the future of Slovakia. However, since Branislav Gröhling's takeover, the party has become more pro-European. The party holds civil libertarian positions including support for drug liberalisation, same-sex marriage, and LGBT rights, and advocates economically liberal policies rooted in the ideas of the Austrian School. The party launched a campaign called Referendum 2009 to hold a referendum on reforming and cutting the cost of politics. SaS also makes heavy use of the Internet, such during the 2010 Slovak parliamentary election through Facebook and Twitter, with the party having 68,000 fans on Facebook by the election.

SaS narrowly failed to cross the 5% threshold at the 2009 European Parliament election in Slovakia but came fourth, winning 22 seats, at the 2010 Slovak parliamentary election. It became part of the four-party centre-right coalition government, holding four cabinet positions, with Sulík elected the Speaker of the National Council. In the 2012 Slovak parliamentary election, the party suffered a major setback and lost half its 22 seats, and held four positions in the government of Slovakia before the election. In the 2019 European Parliament election in Slovakia, the party returned two Members of the European Parliament (MEPs). The party is a member of the European Conservatives and Reformists Party. Sulík left the Alliance of Liberals and Democrats for Europe group (ALDE group) in the European Parliament to sit with the European Conservatives and Reformists (ECR group) on 2 October 2014. After the 2020 Slovak parliamentary election, the party lost several seats in the National Council but became part of the coalition government (Matovič's Cabinet) with Ordinary People and Independent Personalities–NOVA–Christian Union–Change from Below, For the People, and We Are Family.

== History ==
=== Beginnings ===
Original party logo

Richard Sulík was special adviser to Ivan Mikloš and Ján Počiatek, the country's two Ministers of Finance, with whom he worked to simplify the tax system and implement Slovakia's 19% flat tax. He announced his intention to found Freedom and Solidarity on 10 October 2008, calling for a party dedicated to economic freedom and questioning the commitment of the Slovak Democratic and Christian Union – Democratic Party (SDKÚ–DS) to that objective. Analysts cited a lack of any liberal party in the country. After securing the 10,000 signatures required to found a party, SaS made its public debut in February 2009, ahead of the 2009 European Parliament election on 6 June. The party set publicly declared goals of entering the National Council of Slovakia in 2010 and entering government in 2014.

At SaS's founding congress in Bratislava on 28 February 2009, Sulík was elected as Chairman and Jana Kiššová as General Manager. SaS selected economist Ján Oravec, to be its candidate for the 2009 European Parliament election in Slovakia. The party supported the SDKÚ–DS candidate Iveta Radičová in the 2009 Slovak presidential election in March and April; she was defeated in the second round. With others, Sulík was approached by Declan Ganley to join the Libertas.eu alliance of Eurosceptic parties for the European elections but turned down the invitation in order to remain independent. While he was also a sceptic of the Lisbon Treaty and more generally a critic of European intransparency and bureaucracy, he did not share the isolationist position of Libertas. In the 2009 European Parliament election, SaS received 4.7% of the votes, just missing the 5% election threshold; SDKÚ–DS accused SaS of unnecessarily furthering the fragmentation of the political right in Slovakia. In the 2009 Slovak regional elections, SaS won one seat in Bratislava.

=== 2009 referendum and 2010 parliamentary election ===
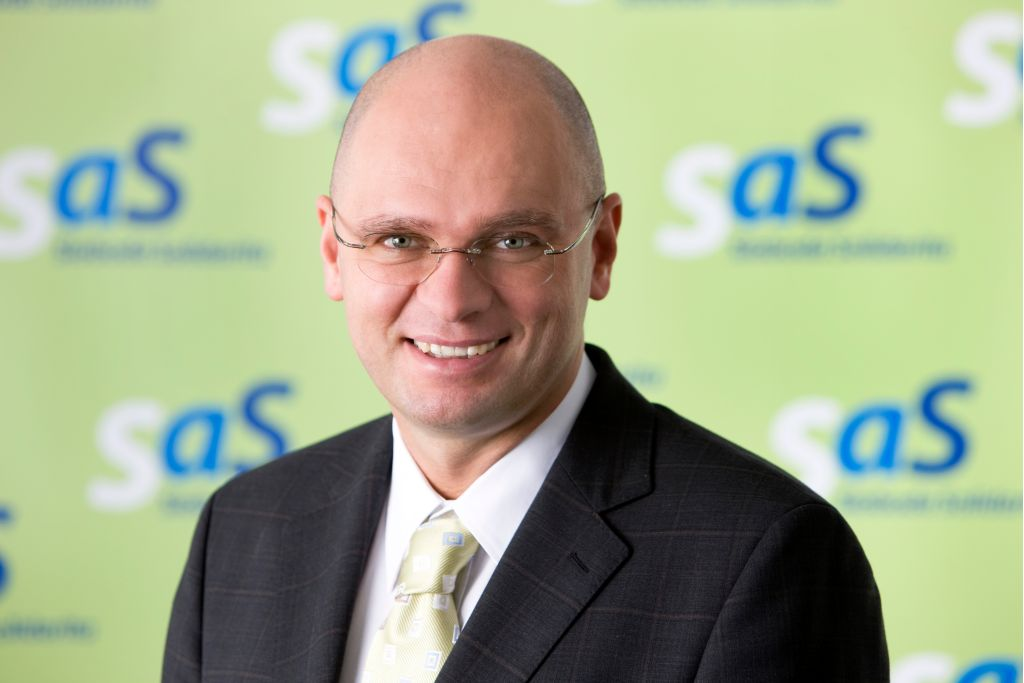
Richard Sulík founded SaS in 2009 to advance the ideas that he had proposed as counsellor to the Finance Ministry.

In late 2009, SaS promoted a referendum striving for major cuts to politicians' privileges. The demands included downsizing the Slovak parliament from 150 to 100 MPs, scrapping their immunity from criminal prosecution and limits to be placed on the public finances spent on government officials' cars. Furthermore, they demanded that the radio and television market should be further liberalized, abolishing concessionary fees, and public officials' right to comment and reply to media coverage should be removed from the press law. In January 2010, SaS announced that by the end of 2009 it had managed to collect the 350,000 signatures needed in order to call a referendum. SaS forwarded the signatures to the Slovak president Ivan Gašparovič, requesting him to schedule the referendum for the date of the parliamentary election on 12 June 2010.

In March 2010, people reported Sulík to the police for the content of the manifesto for the 2010 Slovak parliamentary election, arguing that the party's manifesto commitment to legalisation of cannabis constituted the criminal offence of "spread of addiction". This was thrown out by the prosecutors, who refused to press charges. The party's candidates were the most open about the state of their personal wealth. In the election to the National Council, SaS received 12.1%, coming third, and won 22 seats. The party was the only one in opposition that took votes from Direction – Social Democracy (Smer–SD), although it was estimated that more of its votes came from former SDKÚ–DS voters.

The party entered into coalition negotiations with three centre-right parties, namely the Slovak Democratic and Christian Union (SDKÚ–DS), Christian Democratic Movement (KDH) and Most–Híd. The parties agreed a common programme and allocated ministries, with SaS controlling four ministries as well as choosing the Speaker of the National Council. During the negotiations, Igor Matovič, one of the four MPs elected on the SaS list from the Ordinary People faction, alleged that he had been offered a bribe to destabilise the talks, prompting Sulík to make a formal complaint to the prosecutor. On 29 June 2010, the President decided that the 2009 referendum petition met the requirements and the vote would go ahead on 18 September 2010. Four of the six issues in the referendum were part of the agreed programme of the new coalition government. In the 2010 Slovak political reform referendum, the turnout fell far below the 50% required.

=== 2012 and 2016 parliamentary elections ===
In February 2011, Igor Matovič was ejected from the caucus for voting for Smer–SD's proposed restrictions on dual nationality. Ordinary People filed to become an independent political party on 28 October 2011 and run as a separate list, along with two small conservative parties. In the 2012 Slovak parliamentary election, SaS received 5.9% of the vote, placing it the sixth-largest party in the National Council with 11 deputies. In the 2014 European Parliament election in Slovakia, SaS came in sixth place nationally, receiving 6.7% of the vote and had one member elected as a Member of the European Parliament. In the 2016 Slovak parliamentary election, the party received 12.1% of the vote, coming in as the second-largest party in the National Council with 21 deputies, exceeding expectations and making it the most successful election in SaS history.

=== In the European Parliament ===
Following the 2014 European Parliament election, Sulík questioned the involvement of SaS within the Alliance of Liberals and Democrats for Europe group (ALDE group), with speculation that the party could instead switch groups to join the European Conservatives and Reformists (ECR group). While Sulík joined the ALDE group as Member of European Parliament for the start of the 8th European Parliament, he later defected to the ECR group on 2 October 2014.

== Ideology and platform ==
On the political spectrum, SaS is considered to be centrist, centre-right, and right-wing. The party has been described as libertarian, liberal, classical liberal, conservative liberal, and libertarian right. The party supports cultural liberalism and economic liberalism in its policies. Economically rooted in neoliberalism, laissez-faire, and the Austrian School, the party believes in economic liberalisation, as well as fiscal conservatism, being led by the father of Slovakia's flat tax, and SaS prides itself on economic expertise; Sulík himself has also been described national liberal. In the 2010 parliamentary election, the party emphasised that it had economic policies completely opposed to those of Fico's First Cabinet and ruled out cooperating with him. The party cites a need to close the budget deficit, and advocates reforming the social insurance system. Sulík's proposal for a welfare and tax system reform, the Contribution Bonus, is based on a combination of flat tax, basic income, and negative income tax; it aims to streamline the system and cut unnecessary expenses and bureaucratic overhead. SaS is notably civil libertarian, being the only major party to campaign for same-sex marriage or for the decriminalisation of cannabis, which put it at odds with its socially conservative past coalition partner, the Christian Democratic Movement (KDH). SaS is also notable for being the only party to be opposed to minimum wage increase, advocating instead for its abolition.

In regards to European Union (EU) politics, SaS is considered to be Eurosceptic, or soft Eurosceptic, something to which the party has shifted the focus from its economic liberal, cultural liberal campaign with strong anti-corruption rhetoric, when Sulík opposed involvement in the Greek government-debt crisis and an EU bailout. The party characterizes itself as Eurorealist and opposes the bureaucratic machinery of the EU as presently organized. SaS opposed the Treaty of Lisbon, the EU economic harmonisation, and an increased EU budget; it is particularly wary of the EU restricting the free market. SaS opposed the European Central Bank's bailout of Greece during the euro area crisis, while Sulík has proposed drawing up plans to withdraw Slovakia from the Eurozone, in case of extraordinary circumstances in the monetary union. Sulík has also been a loud critic of the mandatory refugee relocation EU programme, as well as further European integration at the expense of nation-states. The party supports a liberal position on drug laws and same-sex marriage. It rejects any tough measures to combat climate change.

In the European Parliament, SaS is a member of the European Conservatives and Reformists (ECR group), which does not completely reject the idea of common Europe; party members consider the EU to be a good project, which requires reforms. As a response to Brexit, the party prepared a manifesto with several proposals to reform the European Union.

== Election results ==
=== National Council ===
Election	Leader	Votes	%	Rank	Seats	+/–	Status
2010	Richard Sulík	307,287	12.2	3rd	22 / 150		SDKÚ DS–SaS–KDH–Most Híd
2012	Richard Sulík	150,266	5.9	6th	11 / 150	▼11	Opposition
2016	Richard Sulík	315,558	12.1	2nd	21 / 150	▲10	Opposition
2016	Including one Civic Conservative Party member elected within the party list.						
2020	Richard Sulík	179,246	6.2	6th	13 / 150	▼8	OĽaNO–NOVA–KÚ–ZZ–We Are Family–SaS–For the People (2020–2022)
2020	Richard Sulík	179,246	6.2	6th	13 / 150	▼8	Opposition (2022–2023)
2020	Including two Civic Conservative Party members elected within the party list.						
2023	Richard Sulík	187,911	6.3	6th	11 / 150	▼2	Opposition

=== European Parliament ===
Election	List leader	Votes	%	Rank	Seats	+/–	EP Group
2009	Ján Oravec	39,016	4.7	7th	0 / 13		
2014	Ján Oravec	37,376	6.7	6th	1 / 13	▲1	ALDE (2014)
2014	Ján Oravec	37,376	6.7	6th	1 / 13	▲1	ECR (2014–2019)
2019	Eugen Jurzyca	94,839	9.6	5th	2 / 14	▲1	ECR
2024	Richard Sulík	72,703	4.9	6th	0 / 15	▼2	–

=== Presidential ===
Election	Candidate	First round			Second round		
Election	Candidate	Votes	%	Rank	Votes	%	Rank
2009	Endorsed; Iveta Radičová	713,735	38.1	2nd	988,808	44.5	2nd
2014	Endorsed; Radoslav Procházka	403,548	21.3	3rd	not qualified		
2019	Endorsed; Zuzana Čaputová	870,415	40.6	1st	1,056,582	58.4	1st
2024	Endorsed; Ivan Korčok	958,393	42.5	1st	1,243,709	46.9	2nd

== Party leaders ==
=== Chairman ===
Leader		Year
1	Richard Sulík	2009–2024
2	Branislav Gröhling	2024–present

=== Honorary Chairman ===
Leader		Year
1	Richard Sulík	2024–2026

== Elected representatives ==
=== 2023–2027 ===
After the 2023 Slovak parliamentary election, SaS had 11 members in the National Council, including:

- Richard Sulík
- Mária Kolíková
- Branislav Gröhling
- Vladimíra Marcinková
- Jana Bittó Cigániková
- Marián Viskupič
- Ondrej Dostál (elected as a member of OKS on the SaS party list)
- Alojz Hlina
- Vladimír Ledecký
- Juraj Droba
- Tomáš Szalay
