= Ľudovít Kaník =

Slovak politician (born 1965)

Minister of Labour, Social Affairs, and Family
- In office 16 October 2002 – 17 October 2005
- Succeeded by: Iveta Radičová

Personal details
- Born: 1 September 1965 (age 61) Hnúšťa, Czechoslovakia
- Party: Democratic Party
- Education: University of Economics in Bratislava

Ľudovít Kaník (born 1 September 1965 in Hnúšťa) is a Slovak politician and member of the Democratic Party of Slovakia. He also led Slovak Civic Democratic Party.

Kaník was formerly the Minister of Labour, Social Affairs, and Family.
