= New Democracy (Slovakia) =

The New Democracy (Slovak: Nová Demokracia), abbreviated to ND, was a political party in Slovakia. It split out from the People's Party – Movement for a Democratic Slovakia and its leader was Tibor Mikuš, then chairman of the Trnava self-governing region. It was registered at Interior ministry of Slovakia by 12 January 2009. Establishing assembly was held on 28 March 2009. The party ceased to exist in 2016.
