= 2010 Slovak parliamentary election =

- 12 June 2010

All 150 seats in the National Council 76 seats needed for a majority
- Turnout: 58.65% (▲3.98 pp)
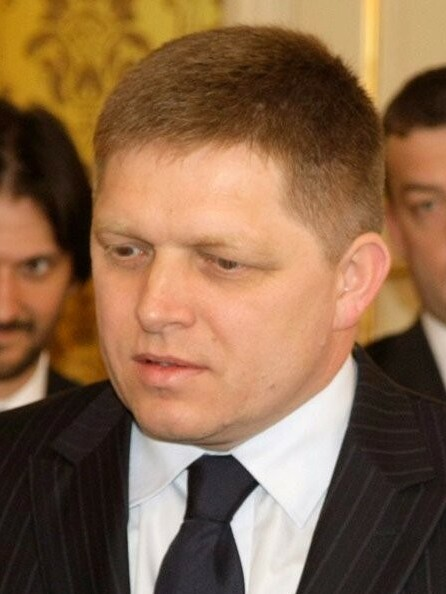

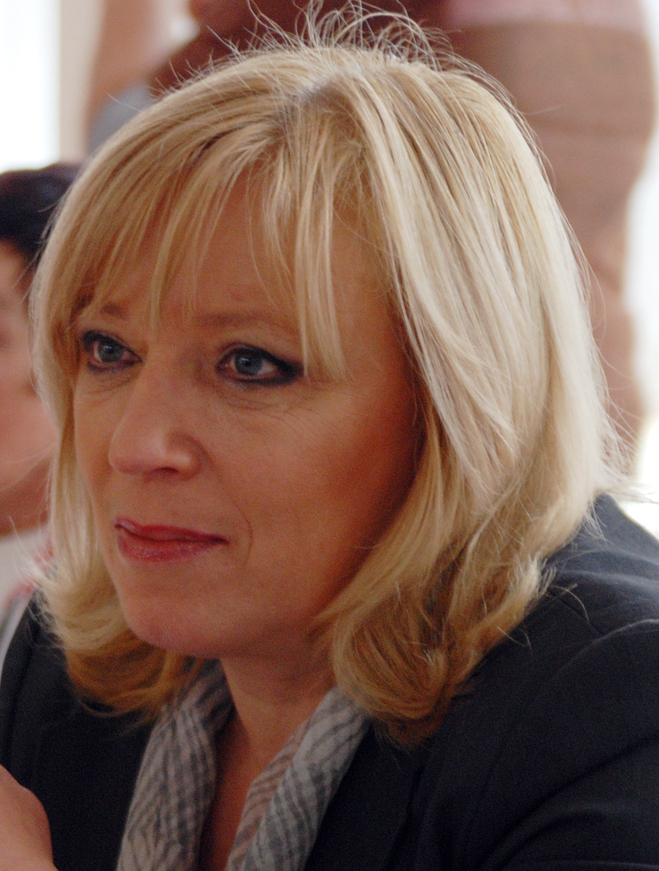

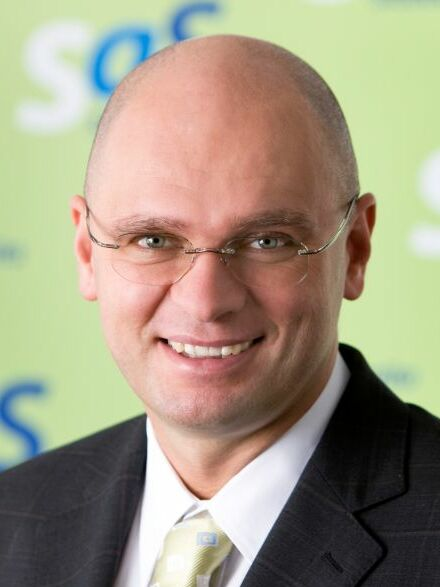

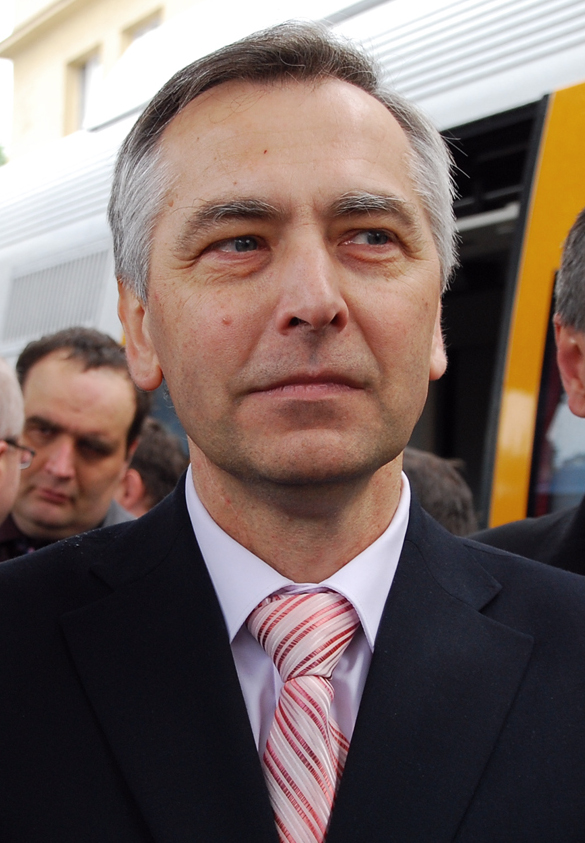

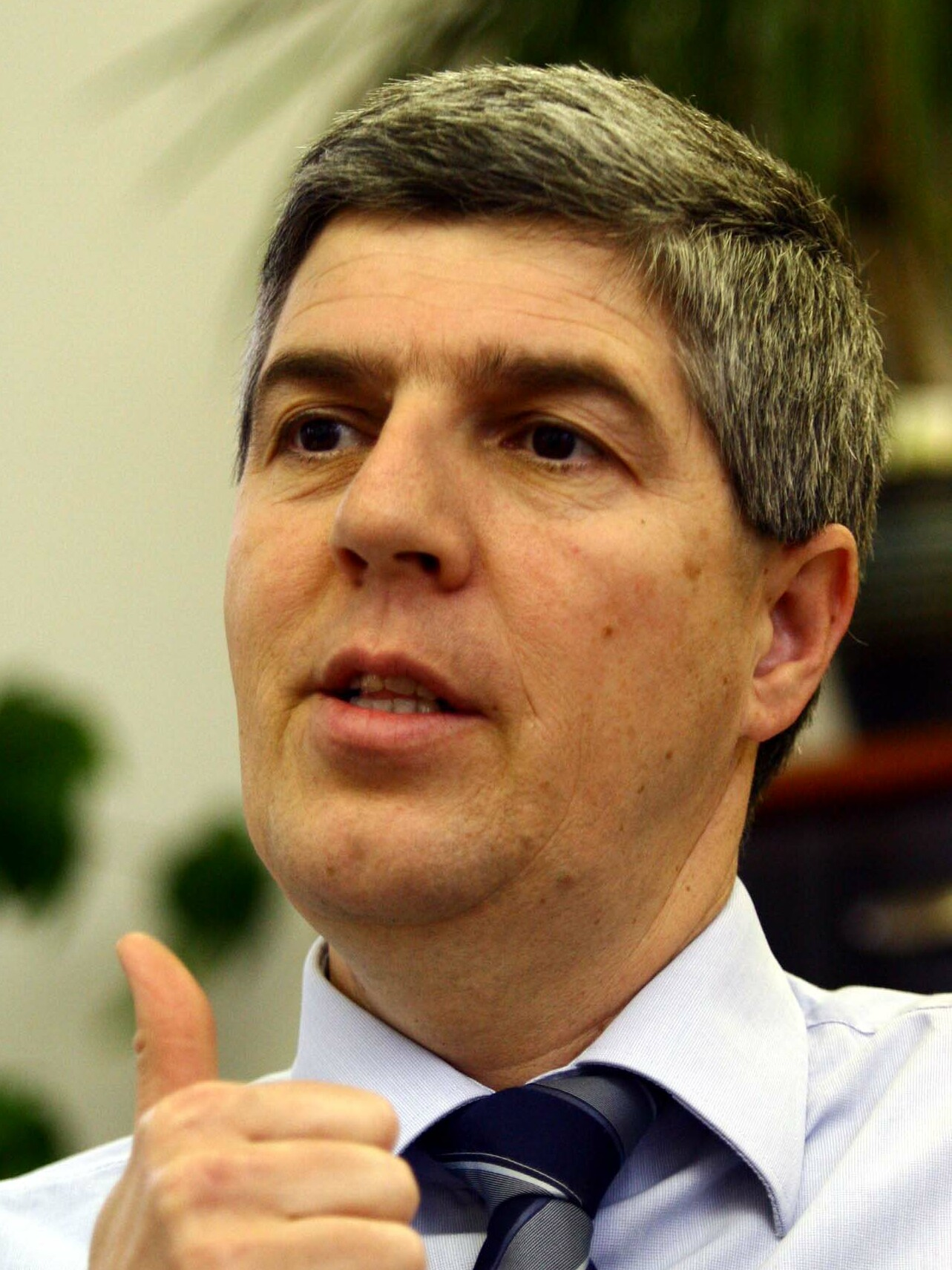

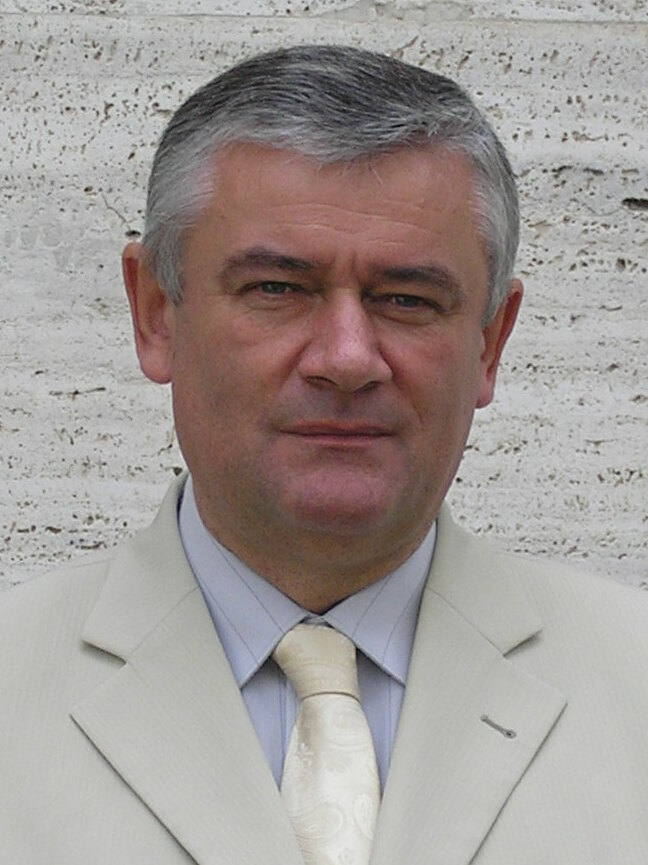
| | First party | Second party | Third party |
|---|---|---|---|
| Leader | Robert Fico | Iveta Radičová | Richard Sulík |
| Party | Smer | SDKÚ–DS | SaS |
| Last election | 50 seats, 29.1% | 31 seats, 18.4% | Did not exist |
| Seats won | 62 | 28 | 22 |
| Seat change | ▲12 | ▼3 | New |
| Popular vote | 880,111 | 390,042 | 307,287 |
| Percentage | 34.8% | 15.42% | 12.1% |
| Swing | ▲5.7 pp | ▼2.9 pp | New |
| | Fourth party | Fifth party | Sixth party |
| Leader | Ján Figeľ | Béla Bugár | Ján Slota |
| Party | KDH | Most–Híd | SNS |
| Last election | 14 seats, 8.3% | Did not exist | 20 seats, 11.7% |
| Seats won | 15 | 14 | 9 |
| Seat change | ▲1 | New | ▼11 |
| Popular vote | 215,755 | 205,538 | 128,490 |
| Percentage | 8.5% | 8.1% | 5.1% |
| Swing | ▲0.2 pp | New | ▼6.7 pp |
- Results of the election, showing vote strength by district.
Prime Minister before election
Robert Fico
Smer
Elected Prime Minister
Iveta Radičová
SDKÚ–DS

Parliamentary elections were held in Slovakia on 12 June 2010. The elections were contested by eighteen parties, six of which passed the 5% threshold for sitting in parliament. Despite the incumbent Smer of Prime Minister Robert Fico winning a plurality, the new government consisted of a coalition led by the Slovak Democratic and Christian Union – Democratic Party's Iveta Radičová and included KDH, SaS and Most-Hid. However, her government fell on 11 October 2011 following a vote of no confidence with a new election called for 10 March 2012.

== Background ==
A total of 2,401 candidates applied to contest the 150 seats.

Polls in February 2010 had indicated that the current governing party Smer-SD (Direction – Social Democracy) would win a plurality with a margin of 25%. However the five opposition right-wing parties – the Slovak Democratic and Christian Union (SDKÚ-DS), the Christian Democratic Movement (KDH), the Party of the Hungarian Coalition (SMK-MKP), Most–Híd, and Freedom and Solidarity (SaS) – could together gain a majority. There were conflicting reports during the campaign as to whether some of these parties would consider joining with Fico. During pre-election campaigning, reports indicated that the "Christian Democrats and the two ethnic Hungarian parties had not ruled out working with Fico." Rumours were reported that prime minister Robert Fico might have secretly agreed not to enter a coalition with the Slovak nationalists again, unless he had no other choice. A later poll by of the Czech News Agency suggested that the governing coalition would lose its majority, and that one of Fico's allies (HZDS) would struggle with the 5% barrier.

== Participating parties ==
| Party | Ideology | Political position | Leader |
|---|---|---|---|
| Direction – Social Democracy (Smer) | Social democracy Left-wing populism | Centre-left | Robert Fico |
| Slovak Democratic and Christian Union – Democratic Party (SDKÚ–DS) | Liberal conservatism Christian democracy | Centre-right | Iveta Radičová |
| Freedom and Solidarity (SaS) | Liberalism; Right-libertarianism | Centre-right | Richard Sulík |
| Christian Democratic Movement (KDH) | Christian democracy Social conservatism | Centre-right | Ján Figeľ |
| Bridge (Most–Híd) | Hungarian minority interests Christian democracy | Centre-right | Béla Bugár |
| Slovak National Party (SNS) | Ultranationalism; Right-wing populism | Far-right | Ján Slota |

== Campaign ==
During the parliamentary elections the SDKÚ-DS ran on a platform of fiscal discipline and pledging to reinvigorate the economy.

== Opinion polls ==
View source data.

According to polling agency Focus in May 2010, eight parties would cross the 5% threshold needed for participation in parliament.

| Party | January 2010 | February 2010 | March 2010 | April 2010 | May 2010 | June 2010 |
|---|---|---|---|---|---|---|
| Direction – Social Democracy | 41.4% | 38.6% | 38.4% | 36.8% | 35.3% | 29.5% |
| Slovak National Party | 6.2% | 6.2% | 6.3% | 8.6% | 6.1% | 7.7% |
| People's Party – Movement for a Democratic Slovakia | 6.5% | 5.8% | 5.4% | 5.4% | 5.1% | 5% |
| Slovak Democratic and Christian Union – Democratic Party | 15.2% | 11.3% | 14.3% | 13.6% | 14% | 12.1% |
| Freedom and Solidarity | 5.1% | 9.6% | 8.6% | 11.5% | 13.3% | 12.4% |
| Christian Democratic Movement | 9.0% | 9.6% | 9.7% | 8.6% | 8.3% | 9.2% |
| Most–Híd | 5.2% | 5.6% | 6.9% | 5.1% | 5.6% | 6.5% |
| Party of the Hungarian Coalition | 5.6% | 5.1% | 5.2% | 5.1% | 5.9% | 5.2% |

According to a poll of the Institute of public affairs (IVO) the voter participation would be about 50 to 60%.

== Results ==
| Party | Votes | % | +/– | Seats | +/– |
|---|---|---|---|---|---|
| Direction – Social Democracy | 880,111 | 34.80 | +5.65 | 62 | +12 |
| Slovak Democratic and Christian Union – Democratic Party | 390,042 | 15.42 | −2.93 | 28 | −3 |
| Freedom and Solidarity | 307,287 | 12.15 | New | 22 | New |
| Christian Democratic Movement | 215,755 | 8.53 | +0.21 | 15 | +1 |
| Most–Híd | 205,538 | 8.13 | New | 14 | New |
| Slovak National Party | 128,490 | 5.08 | −6.66 | 9 | −11 |
| Party of the Hungarian Coalition | 109,638 | 4.33 | −7.35 | 0 | −20 |
| People's Party – Movement for a Democratic Slovakia | 109,480 | 4.33 | −4.47 | 0 | −15 |
| Party of the Democratic Left | 61,137 | 2.42 | +2.3 | 0 | 0 |
| People's Party Our Slovakia | 33,724 | 1.33 | New | 0 | New |
| Communist Party of Slovakia | 21,104 | 0.83 | −3.07 | 0 | 0 |
| Union – Party for Slovakia (Free Forum–+1 Voice) | 17,741 | 0.70 | −2.77 | 0 | 0 |
| Paliho Kapurková, Cheerful Political Party | 14,576 | 0.58 | New | 0 | New |
| European Democratic Party | 10,332 | 0.41 | New | 0 | New |
| New Democracy | 7,962 | 0.31 | New | 0 | New |
| Party of the Roma Coalition | 6,947 | 0.27 | New | 0 | New |
| Union of the Workers of Slovakia | 6,196 | 0.24 | −0.06 | 0 | 0 |
| AZEN – Alliance for Europe of the Nations | 3,325 | 0.13 | New | 0 | New |
| Total | 2,529,385 | 100.00 | – | 150 | 0 |
| Valid votes | 2,529,385 | 98.86 | | | |
| Invalid/blank votes | 29,180 | 1.14 | | | |
| Total votes | 2,558,565 | 100.00 | | | |
| Registered voters/turnout | 4,362,369 | 58.65 | | | |
Source: Volby, IFES

=== Results by region ===
| Region | Smer | SDKÚ–DS | SaS | KDH | Most–Híd | SNS | SMK–MKP | ĽS-HZDS | SDĽ | ĽSNS | Other parties |
|---|---|---|---|---|---|---|---|---|---|---|---|
| Bratislava Region | 25.11 | 27.58 | 18.03 | 7.99 | 8.25 | 3.85 | 0.95 | 2.69 | 2.04 | 0.64 | |
| Trnava Region | 26.98 | 13.68 | 10.88 | 7.09 | 18.18 | 3.67 | 10.28 | 3.27 | 1.98 | 0.89 | |
| Trenčín Region | 44.78 | 12.97 | 12.63 | 7.97 | 1.41 | 7.11 | 0.02 | 5.93 | 2.78 | 1.09 | |
| Nitra Region | 30.70 | 11.81 | 9.12 | 5.25 | 17.26 | 4.44 | 12.90 | 3.16 | 1.93 | 1.03 | |
| Žilina Region | 42.45 | 12.61 | 12.75 | 10.98 | 1.40 | 9.07 | 0.02 | 4.36 | 2.59 | 0.93 | |
| Banská Bystrica Region | 35.15 | 14.22 | 12.68 | 5.44 | 7.18 | 5.06 | 5.41 | 5.40 | 2.79 | 2.18 | |
| Prešov Region | 41.68 | 13.66 | 9.91 | 14.97 | 1.67 | 3.75 | 0.05 | 4.59 | 2.60 | 2.08 | |
| Košice Region | 31.61 | 16.07 | 11.02 | 8.16 | 10.13 | 3.64 | 5.31 | 5.36 | 2.60 | 1.79 | |
| Total in Slovakia | 34.80 | 15.42 | 12.15 | 8.53 | 8.13 | 5.08 | 4.33 | 4.33 | 2.42 | 1.33 | |
| Cities | 32.46 | 19.68 | 15.03 | 7.98 | 7.20 | 4.62 | 2.43 | 3.56 | 2.39 | 1.34 | |
| Villages | 37.64 | 10.20 | 8.62 | 9.19 | 9.25 | 5.63 | 6.65 | 5.26 | 2.44 | 1.32 | |

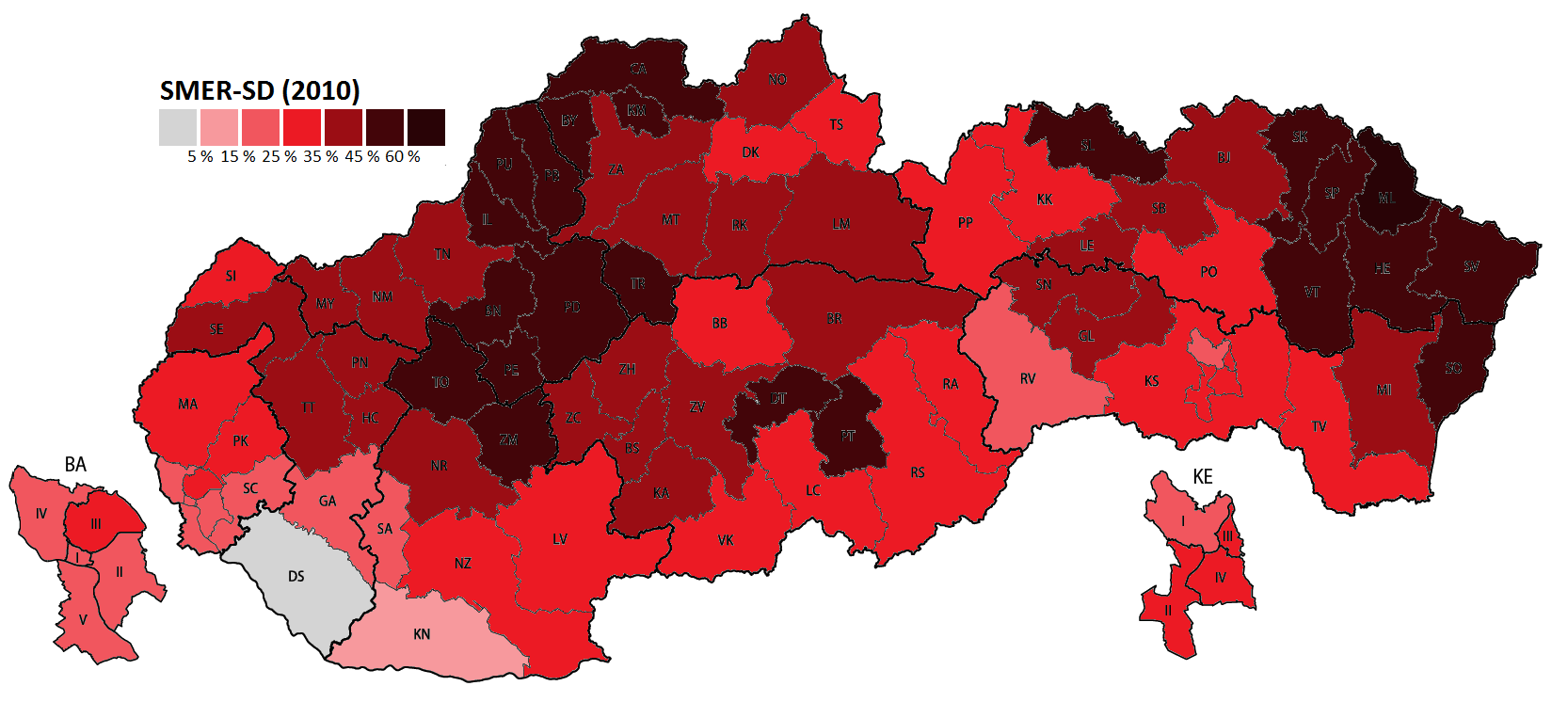
Smer

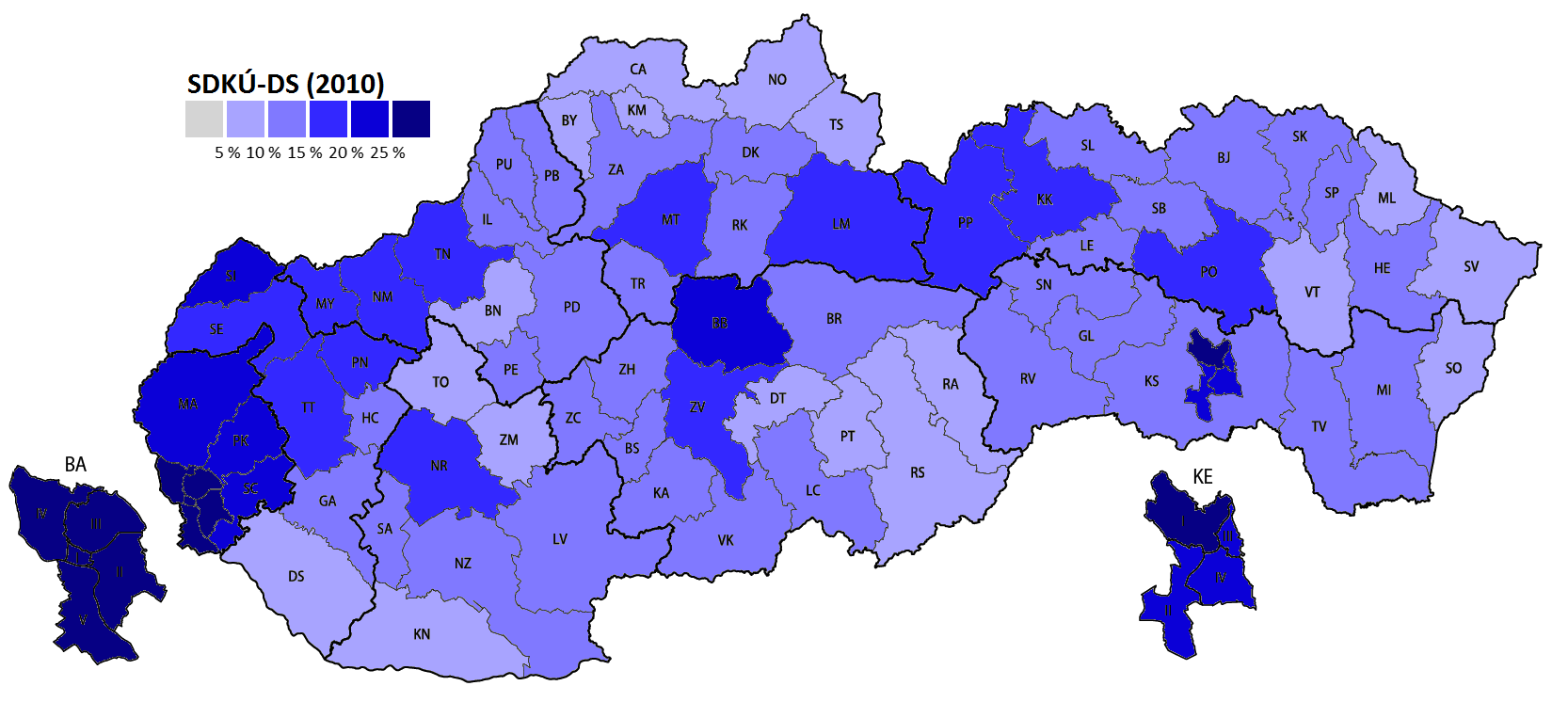
SDKÚ-DS

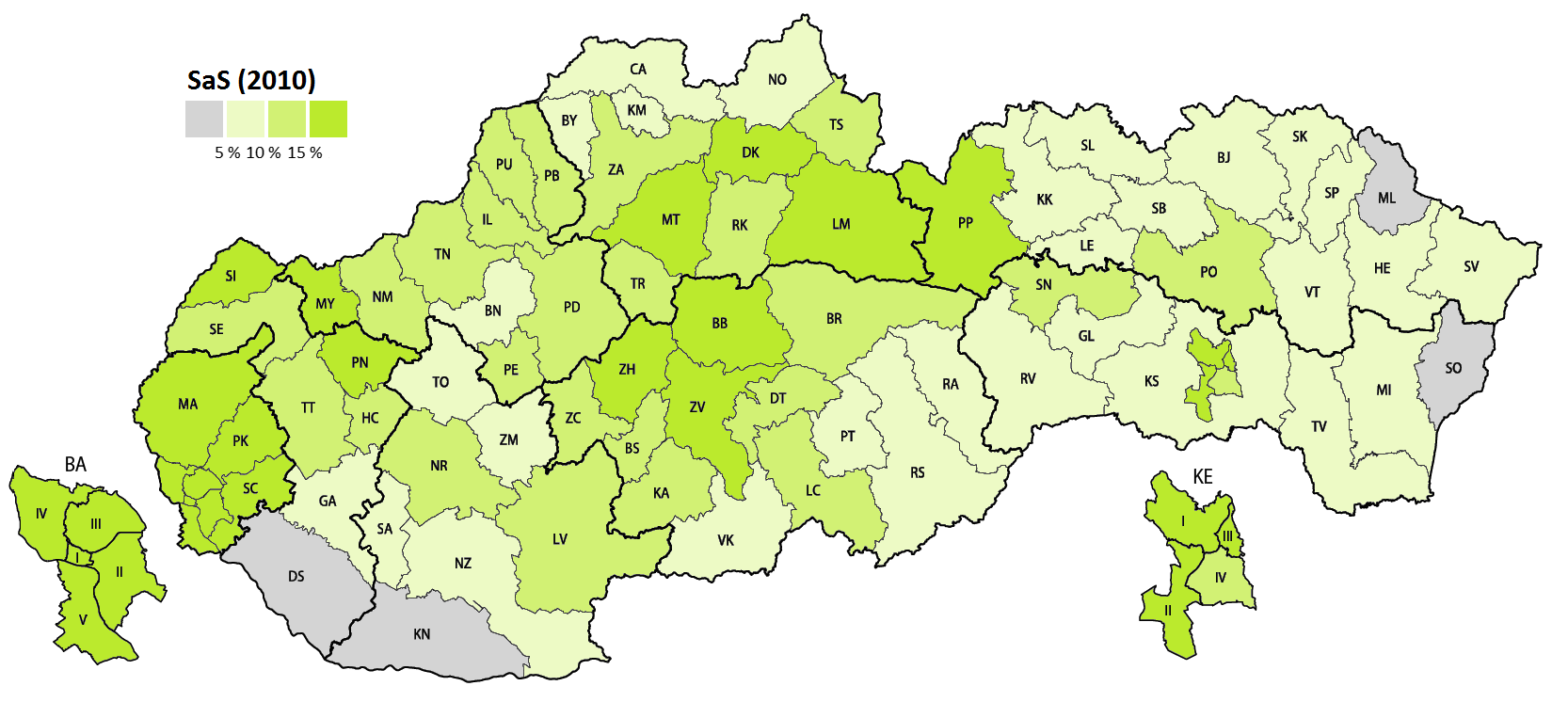
SaS

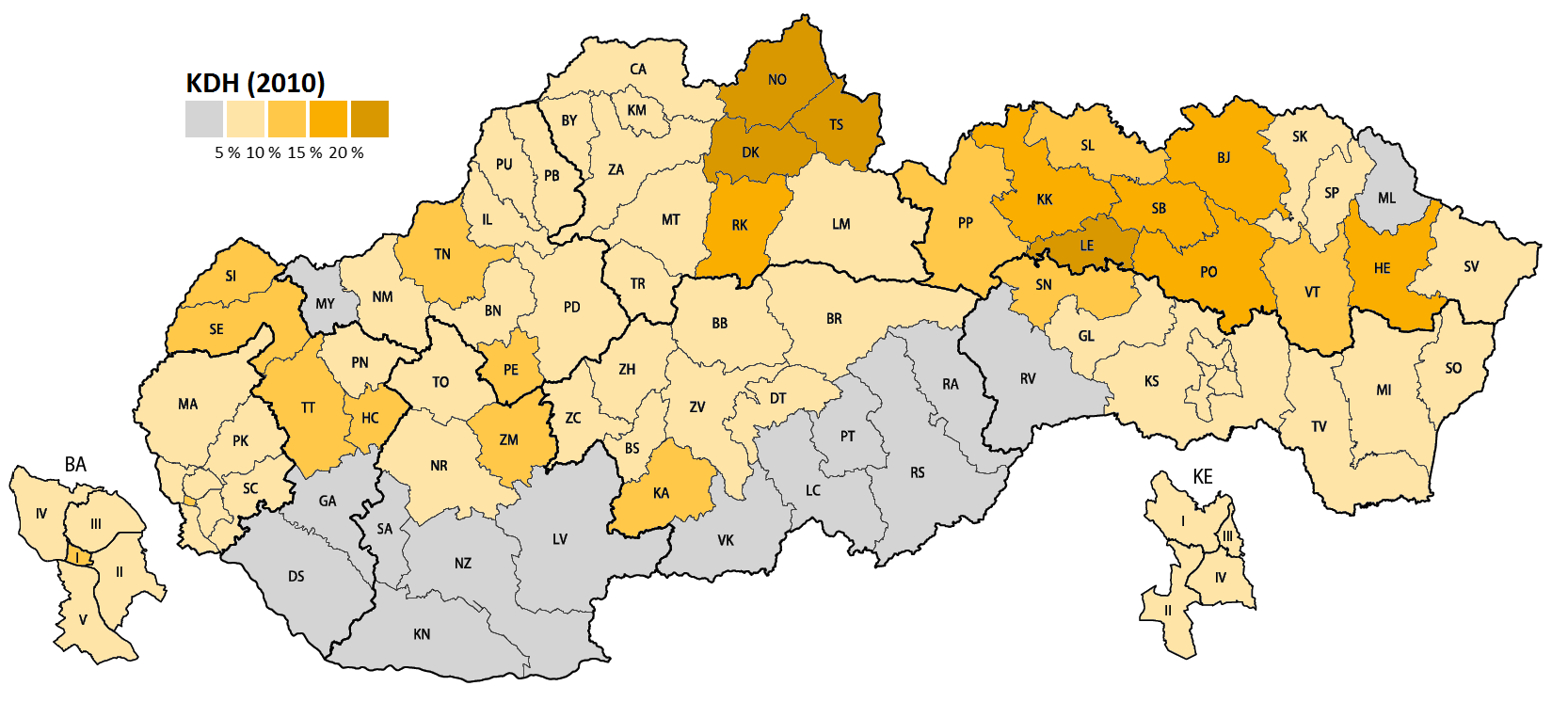
KDH

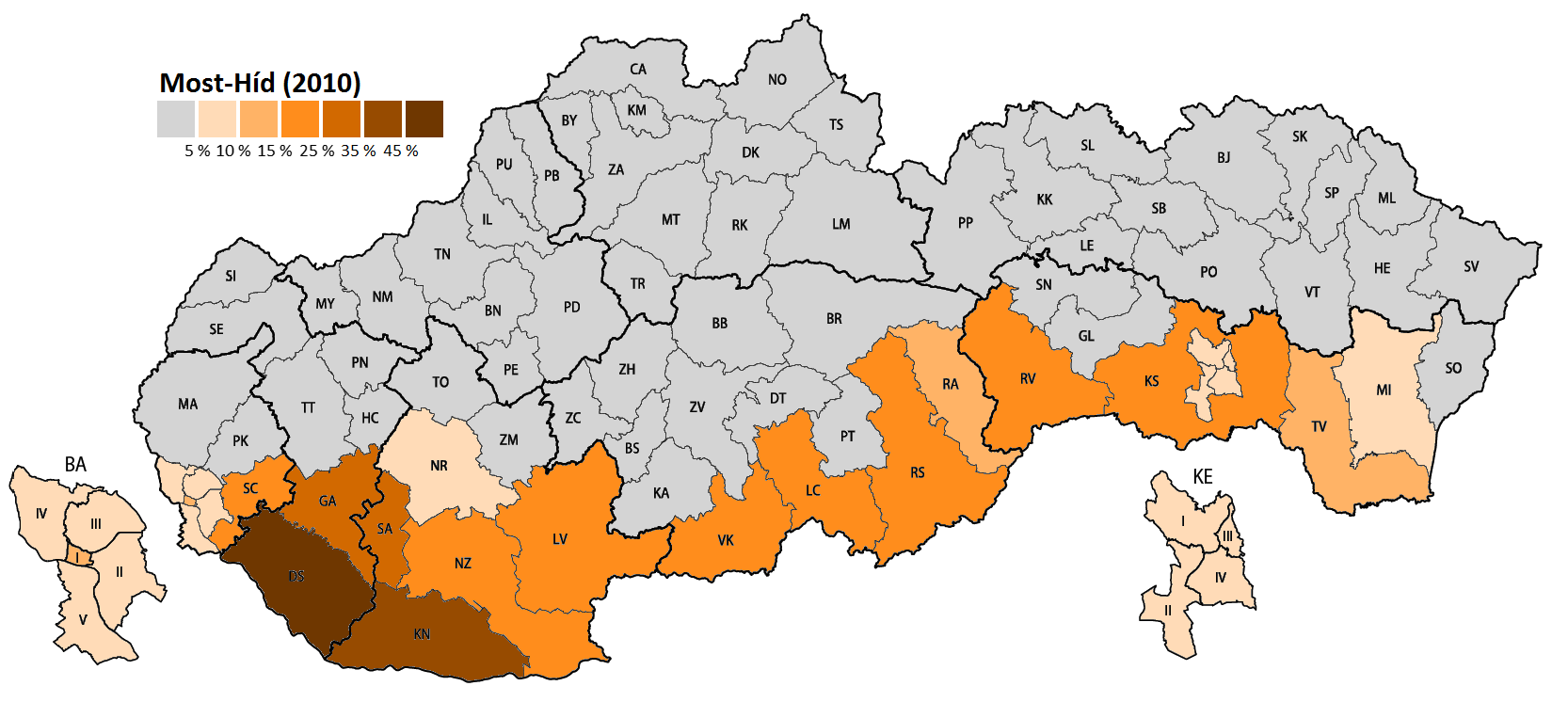
Most-Híd

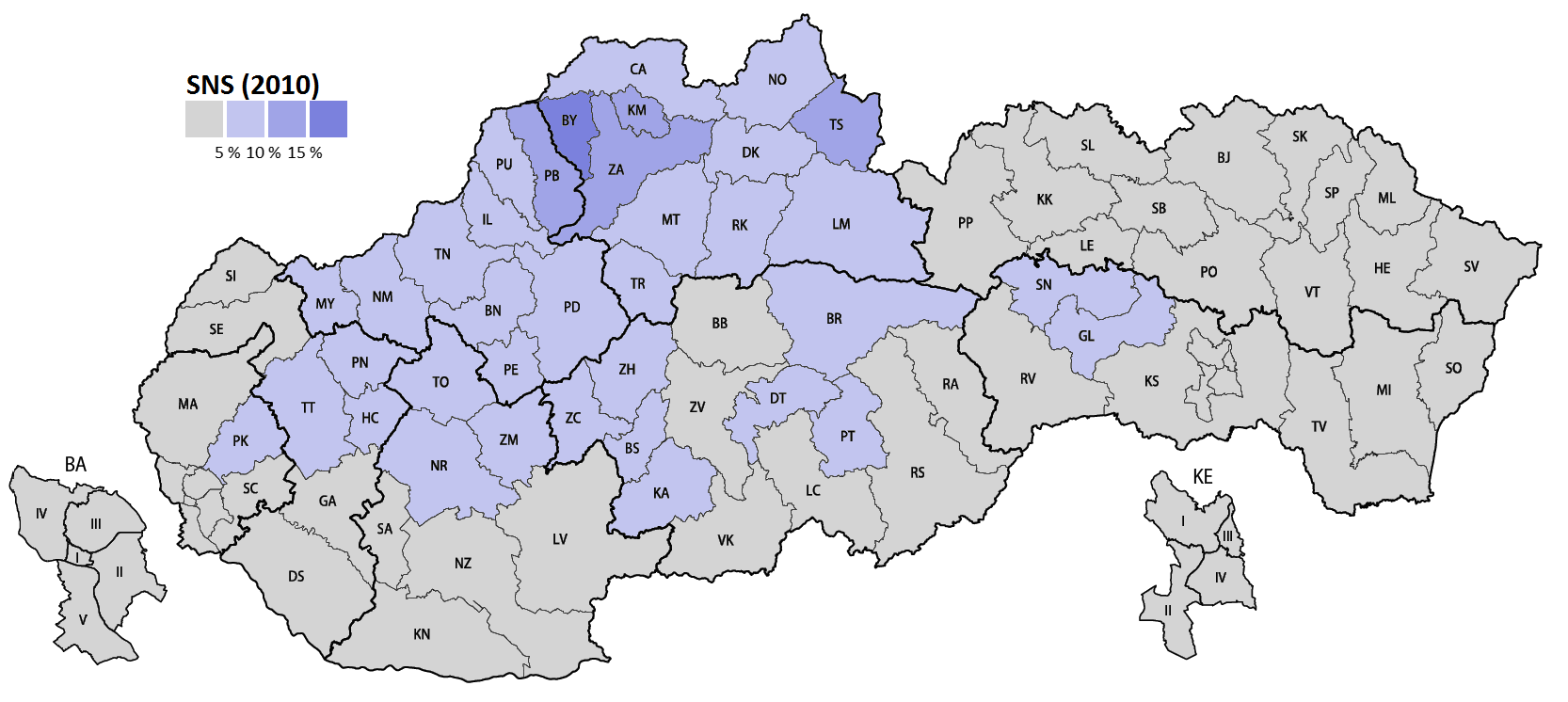
SNS

== New government ==
Incumbent Prime Minister Robert Fico's Direction – Social Democracy (Smer) party increased its seat share by 12 to 62. However, Fico faced an uphill battle to remain prime minister, as his coalition partners were decimated. The Slovak National Party barely passed the 5% vote threshold required for parliamentary representation while losing 11 of their 20 seats, while the People's Party – Movement for a Democratic Slovakia was shut out of the chamber altogether. Despite the setback, Fico said that he wanted to try to form a cabinet even though his leftist coalition could only command 71 of the 150 parliament seats and would thus force the need for at least one of the opposing centre-right parties. This has been described as an unlikely, but possible, occurrence, because opposition parties stated during the election that they would not enter government with Fico. One analyst said that he "strictly rule[d] out that any of the centre-right parties could team up with Smer."

The Slovak President, Ivan Gasparovic, asked Fico to attempt to form a government stating that "I believe that the party that won such support from the people deserves the chance."

The second placed Slovak Democratic and Christian Union – Democratic Party had coalition talks with the Christian Democratic Movement, Freedom and Solidarity and Most–Híd. On 16 June it was reported that the four opposition parties which had won seats in the parliament had agreed to form a government under the leadership of Radičová.

An agreement on the distribution of ministries was reached on 28 June 2010. Radičová was then sworn in as PM on 8 July 2010, after her coalition (comprising SDKU, KDH, SaS and Most-Hid) secured a majority of 79 seats in the 150-seat parliament and Fico and his cabinet tendered their resignations. The new government pledged to cut state spending and the budget deficit and to attract more foreign investment, while steering clear of tax rises. "We are ready to take responsibility over the country at a time when it is coping with the impact of a deep economic crisis and the irresponsible decisions of our political predecessors." They have also sought, through Most-Hid, to rebuild links with Hungary that were badly damaged by the adoption of contentious language and citizenship laws.

=== Fall of government ===
On 11 October 2011, parliament voted to approve the expansion of the European Financial Stability Fund on the grounds, according to the Freedom and Solidarity, that Slovakia, the second poorest eurozone country, should not bailout richer countries such as Greece and for bank re-capitalisation. As Slovakia was the last eurozone country to vote on the measure, Radičová made it a no confidence vote. The measure then failed by 21 votes after both Freedom and Solidarity and Smer abstained. However, another vote was expected with Smer rumoured to support it should there be a new election and more stringent terms. Smer came to an agreement with the governing coalition to support the measure in what Fico called "the most important document of this period." He also explained the first round rejection of the measure as "saying 'no' to a rightist government, but we're saying 'yes' to the rescue fund." As per the agreement between the two parties, Minister of Foreign and European Affairs Mikulas Dzurinda said that a snap election had been called: "We decided that as the first point of [Thursday's] parliamentary session, we will work on a proposal to shorten the voting period, with the goal of organising an election on 10 March. Immediately after [13 October or 14 October] we will debate proposals related to the EFSF."
