= Civic Democratic Union (Slovakia) =

Civic Democratic Union Občianska demokratická únia
- Abbreviation: ODÚ
- Founded: October 1991
- Dissolved: March 1994
- Preceded by: Public Against Violence
- Merged into: Democratic Party
- Ideology: Liberalism; Liberal conservatism
- Political position: Centre to centre-right

The Civic Democratic Union (Slovak: Občianska demokratická únia) was a liberal political party in Slovakia between 1991 and 1994. It was founded as the Civic Democratic Union–Public Against Violence (Slovak: Občianska demokratická únia–Verejnosť proti násilu) as a new political party succeeding the former political movement Public Against Violence (VPN). During his term as Prime Minister of Czechoslovakia, Marián Čalfa joined the party and became one of the leading members. In the 1992 Slovak parliamentary election, the party failed to gain any seats in parliament. In 1994, the party merged into the Democratic Party.
