= Democratic Party (Slovakia, 1989) =

Democratic Party Demokratická strana
- Abbreviation: DS
- Founded: 23 January 1990
- Dissolved: 13 February 2006
- Preceded by: Party of Slovak Revival
- Merged into: SDKÚ-DS
- Headquarters: Bratislava, Slovakia
- Ideology: Conservative liberalism Liberal conservatism Conservatism; Economic liberalism
- Political position: Centre-right
- National affiliation: Slovak Democratic Coalition (1997–2000)
- Colours: Blue

The Democratic Party (Slovak: Demokratická strana, DS) was a political party in Slovakia, active between 1989 and 2006.

== History ==
The party emerged from the Democratic Party Party of Slovak Revival (SSO) which had been a bloc party within the communist-dominated National Front of the ČSSR since 1948. In December 1989, at the end of the Velvet Revolution that ended the communist rule in Czechoslovakia, the SSO decided to change its name to Democratic Party, claiming to be a continuation of the historical Democratic Party that had existed from 1944 to 1948 and had been the strongest party in Slovakia during the immediate post-war period before the communist takeover.

The DS won 7 seats out of 150 in the Slovak parliament (Slovak National Council) and no seats in the federal parliament in 1990, but no seats in any parliament in 1992.

In 1994, the party was "recreated" by a merge with the parties:

- Občiansko-demokratická únia (ODÚ, Civic Democratic Union, i.e. the remnants of the former Public Against Violence party)
- Občianska demokratická strana Slovenska (Civic Democratic Party of Slovakia)
- Demokrati 92 (Democrats 92)
- Hnutie česko-slovenského porozumenia (Movement of Czech-Slovak comprehension)
- Zelená liga (The Green League)

The new chairman of the party was P. Hagyari, and the vice-chairman was Ivan Mikloš, the finance minister of Slovakia in 2010 - 2012.

In the 1994 parliamentary election, the party run for parliamentary seats together with the Strana podnikateľov a živnostníkov (Party of Entrepreneurs and businessmen), but again won no seats. Hagyari was replaced by Ján Langoš, the former minister of the interior of Czechoslovakia, in 1995.

In the 1998 election, the party run for parliamentary seats within the coalition (later party) Slovak Democratic Coalition (SDK), so that many candidates of the Democratic Party got into the parliament as candidates of the SDK. In the course of the subsequent dissolution of the Slovak Democratic Coalition in 2001, some members left the Democratic Party (Ivan Mikloš, for example, became a chairman of the newly founded Slovak Democratic and Christian Union), and František Šebej became the new chairman for short time and was quickly replaced by Ľudovít Kaník.

In the 2002 election, the party run for parliamentary seats together with the parties Civic Conservative Party (OKS, led by Ján Langoš) and Liberal-Democratic Union (LDÚ, led by Ján Budaj), both of which arose in the course of the dissolution of the SDK. Shortly before the election however the party withdraw its candidature and recommended its voters to vote for the Slovak Democratic and Christian Union (SDKÚ) of Mikuláš Dzurinda. This was due to an agreement with the SDKÚ, according to which Ľudovít Kaník, the chairman of the Democratic Party, received one seat in the new 2002 government - the seat of the minister of social affairs and family. After a scandal, however, Kaník left the government in October 2005 and talks about a merge of the Democratic Party with the SDKÚ were announced.

The extraordinary party congress held on December 17, 2005, approved that the party would merge with the SDKÚ (whose name then changed to SDKÚ-DS). The merger was approved by a SDKÚ congress held on January 21, 2006.

== Election results ==
=== Federal Assembly ===
Year	Leader	Vote	Vote %	Seats	Place	Government
1990	Ján Holčík	149,310	1.4	0 / 150	13th	extra-parliamentary
1990	Ján Holčík	124,561	1.2	0 / 150	13th	extra-parliamentary
1992	Ján Holčík	122,226	1.2	0 / 150	19th	extra-parliamentary
1992	Ján Holčík	113,176	1.2	0 / 150	19th	extra-parliamentary

=== National Council ===
Year	Leader	Vote	Vote %	Seats	Place	Government
1990	Ján Holčík	148,567	4.40	7 / 150	6th	Yes
1992	Ján Holčík	102,058 ▼	3.91 ▼	0 / 150	8th ▼	extra-parliamentary
1994	Anton Ďuriš	98,555 ▼	3.4 ▼	0 / 150	8th	extra-parliamentary
1998	Mikuláš Dzurinda	884,497 ▲	26.33 ▲	42 / 150	2nd ▲	Yes
2002	Ľudovít Kaník	Withdrew	0.0 ▼	0 / 150	Did not run	Did not run
