= 2017 Slovak regional elections =

2017 Slovak regional election
- 4 November 2017
- All 416 seats in regional parliaments All 8 seats for regional governors
- Turnout: 1,348,114 (29.95%) ▲9.84 pp
Party	Leader	Vote %	Seats	+/–
Regional deputies
Independents	Vacant	38.7	165	+92
Smer–SD	Robert Fico	21.4	89	−72
KDH	Alojz Hlina	11.1	47	−10
SMK	József Menyhárt	7.9	33	−4
OĽaNO	Igor Matovič	5.5	21	+21
SaS	Richard Sulík	3.6	15	+6
SNS	Andrej Danko	3.6	15	+10
Most	Béla Bugár	2.4	10	−7
NOVA	Gábor Grendel	1.7	7	+2
ZZ–DÚ	Ján Budaj	1.2	5	+3
Šanca	Viliam Novotný	0.5	2	+2
ĽSNS	Marian Kotleba	0.5	2	+2
OKS	Ondrej Dostál	0.2	1	−1
NF	Tomáš Černý	0.2	1	0
DD	Vladimír Chovan	0.2	1	+1
ŠKV	Igor Sidor	0.2	1	+1
Regional governors
Independents	Vacant	25.0	2	+2
Smer–SD	Robert Fico	25.0	2	−4
OĽaNO	Igor Matovič	25.0	2	+2
KDH	Alojz Hlina	12.5	1	+1
SaS	Richard Sulík	12.5	1	+1
This lists parties that won seats. See the complete results below.

Elections were held in Slovakia's 8 self-governing regions on 4 November 2017.

In 2017, deputies of the Slovak National Council voted to extend the term of governors from 4 years to 5 years, and change from a 2-round election to only 1 round.

The turnout was around 30%, biggest in the history of Slovak regional elections.

Governor of Banská Bystrica Region and leader of the far-right People's Party – Our Slovakia, Marian Kotleba was defeated in the Slovak regional elections of 2017 by an independent candidate, Ján Lunter.

== Results ==
=== Bratislava Region ===
Summary of the 4 November 2017 regional elections in Bratislava Region
Presidency			Regional government		
Candidate	Votes	%	Diagram	Parties and coalitions	Seats
Juraj Droba (Center-right coalition)	36,864	20.42		Independent candidates (NEKA)	25
Rudolf Kusý (NEKA)	33,489	18.55		Centre-right coalition (Note: SaS, OĽaNO, SMK-MKP, NOVA, OKS, Zmena zdola, DÚ)	17
Milan Ftáčnik (NEKA)	31,638	17.52		Coalition of Smer-SD, SDKU-DS, Most-Hid and others	6
Ján Mrva (NEKA)	28,842	15.97		Doma dobre	1
Pavol Frešo (NEKA)	19,640	10.88		Nezávislé forum	1
Daniel Krajcer (SKOK-ELD, Most-Hid, SZ)	13,934	7.72			
Others	16,083	8.91			
Total	180,490				50
Valid votes	180,490	98.44			
Invalid votes	2,852	1.56			
Votes cast / turnout	183,342	31.34			
Registered voters	584,995				

=== Trnava Region ===
Summary of the 4 November 2017 regional elections in Trnava Region
Presidency			Regional government		
Candidate	Votes	%	Diagram	Parties and coalitions	Seats
Jozef Viskupič (OĽaNO, SaS, KDH and others (Note: OĽaNO, SaS, KDH, OKS, Zmena zdola, DÚ))	48,584	42.90		Independent candidates (NEKA)	14
Tibor Mikuš (NEKA)	34,601	30.55		SMK-MKP	13
Jozsef Berenyi (SMK-MKP)	19,414	17.14		Centre-right coalition	11
Konrád Rigó (Most-Hid)	6,362	5.61		Direction – Social Democracy	1
Márius Novák (NEKA)	2,268	2.00		Most-Hid	1
Jaroslav Cehlárik (NEKA)	2,000	1.76			
Total	113,229				40
Valid votes	113,229	96.57			
Invalid votes	4,023	3.43			
Votes cast / turnout	117,252	24.74			
Registered voters	473,880				

=== Trenčín Region ===
Summary of the 4 November 2017 regional elections in Trenčín Region
Presidency			Regional government		
Candidate	Votes	%	Diagram	Parties and coalitions	Seats
Jaroslav Baška (SMER-SD, SNS, Most-Hid, SZ)	62,807	49.98		Independent candidates (NEKA)	22
Renáta Kaščáková (SaS, OĽaNO, KDH and others (Note: SaS, OĽaNO, KDH, NOVA, OKS, Zmena zdola, DÚ))	31,580	25.13		Coalition of SMER, SNS, Most-Hid and SZ	16
Štefan Škultéty (NEKA)	17,403	13.85		Centre-right coalition	9
Petra Hajšelová (We Are Family)	6,032	4.80			
Ferdinand Vavrík (NEKA)	4,079	3.24			
Nora Pániková (SZS)	2,477	1.97			
Igor Valko (New Parliament)	1,274	1.01			
Total	125,652				47
Valid votes	125,652	96.70			
Invalid votes	4,288	3.30			
Votes cast / turnout	129,940	26.31			
Registered voters	493,851				

=== Nitra Region ===
Summary of the 4 November 2017 regional elections in Nitra Region
Presidency			Regional government		
Candidate	Votes	%	Diagram	Parties and coalitions	Seats
Milan Belica (SMER-SD, SNS, Most-Hid)	52,184	34.10		Coalition of SMER, SNS and Most-Hid	17
Ján Greššo (SaS, OĽaNO, KDH and others (Note: SaS, OĽaNO, KDH, NOVA, OKS, Šanca, DÚ))	26,382	17.24		Independent candidates (NEKA)	15
Milan Uhrík (ĽSNS)	23,502	15.36		Party of the Hungarian Community	11
Peter Oremus (NEKA)	22,827	14.92		Centre-right coalition	10
Iván Farkas (SMK-MKP)	21,084	13.78		People's Party Our Slovakia	1
Others	7,014	4.58			
Total	152,993				54
Valid votes	152,993	97.90			
Invalid votes	3,275	2.10			
Votes cast / turnout	156,268	26.84			
Registered voters	582,228				

=== Žilina Region ===
Summary of the 4 November 2017 regional elections in Žilina Region
Presidency			Regional government		
Candidate	Votes	%	Diagram	Parties and coalitions	Seats
Erika Jurinová (OĽaNO, SaS, KDH, NOVA, OKS)	82,034	43.67		Independent candidates (NEKA)	25
Juraj Blanár (SMER-SD)	55,931	29.77		Coalition of OĽaNO, SaS, KDH, NOVA, OKS	17
Marián Murín (NEKA)	19,425	10.34		Direction – Social Democracy	10
Peter Sagan (ĽSNS)	14,323	7.62		Slovak National Party	5
Anton Martvoň (NEKA)	6,615	3.52			
Others	9,492	4.58			
Total	187,820				57
Valid votes	187,820	97.59			
Invalid votes	4,639	2.41			
Votes cast / turnout	192,459	33.84			
Registered voters	568,708				

=== Banská Bystrica Region ===
Summary of the 4 November 2017 regional elections in Banská Bystrica Region
Presidency			Regional government		
Candidate	Votes	%	Diagram	Parties and coalitions	Seats
Ján Lunter (NEKA)	99,169	48.53		Independent candidates (NEKA)	22
Marian Kotleba (ĽSNS)	47,502	23.24		Direction – Social Democracy	15
Igor Kašper (NEKA)	21,741	10.64		Party of the Hungarian Community	5
Martin Juhaniak (NEKA)	19,785	9.68		Coalition of KDH, SaS, OĽaNO, NOVA, OKS	4
Milan Urbáni (SMS)	2,478	1.21		People's Party Our Slovakia	1
Pavel Greksa (NEKA)	2,271	1.11		Most-Híd	1
Others	11,375	5.57		Slovak National Party	1
Total	204,321				49
Valid votes	204,321	96.21			
Invalid votes	8,039	3.79			
Votes cast / turnout	212,360	40.30			
Registered voters	526,978				

=== Prešov Region ===
Summary of the 4 November 2017 regional elections in Prešov Region
Presidency			Regional government		
Candidate	Votes	%	Diagram	Parties and coalitions	Seats
Milan Majerský (KDH, SaS, OĽaNO, NOVA)	72,366	40.36		Independent candidates (NEKA)	22
Peter Chudík (SMER-SD)	54,914	30.62		Coalition of KDH, SaS, OĽaNO, NOVA	21
Jozef Mihalčin (ĽSNS)	12,688	7.07		Direction – Social Democracy	16
Ján Garaj (NEKA)	10,615	5.92		Slovak National Party	2
Andrej Gmitter (NEKA)	8,335	4.64		Dawn	1
František Oľha (Chance)	5,832	3.25			
Others	14,539	4.58			
Total	179,289				62
Valid votes	179,289	95.38			
Invalid votes	8,694	4.62			
Votes cast / turnout	187,983	29.40			
Registered voters	639,324				

=== Košice Region ===
Summary of the 4 November 2017 regional elections in Košice Region
Presidency			Regional government		
Candidate	Votes	%	Diagram	Parties and coalitions	Seats
Rastislav Trnka (SaS, KDH, OĽaNO, NOVA, Chance)	59,599	37.80		Independent candidates (NEKA)	16
Richard Raši (SMER-SD, SMK-MKP, SZS, STANK)	58,724	37.24		Direction – Social Democracy	16
Karol Pataky (Most-Híd, SKOK-ELD)	14,843	9.41		Coalition of SaS, KDH, OĽaNO, NOVA	16
Štefan Surmánek (ĽSNS)	7,375	4.67		Most-Hid	6
Róbert Bačinský (NEKA)	4,903	3.11		Slovak National Party	1
Jarmila Tkáčová (SNS)	3,638	2.30		Party of the Hungarian Community	1
Others	8,569	5.44		Sport for Košice and the East	1
Total	157,651				57
Valid votes	157,651	93.59			
Invalid votes	10,803	6.41			
Votes cast / turnout	168,454	26.73			
Registered voters	630,178				

== Polls ==
=== Banská Bystrica governorship ===
Date	Polling firm	Sample size	Marian Kotleba (ĽSNS)	Martin Klus (SaS)	Milan Urbáni (SMS)	Ján Lunter (independent)	Stanislav Mičev (independent)	Igor Kašper (independent)	Martin Juhaniak (independent)	Ivan Saktor (independent)	Lead
6-18 October 2017	AKO	1,000	21.9%	N/A	2.5%	51.2%	N/A	5.0%	9.4%	1.6%	29.7%
18-26 September 2017	Focus	1,023	22.2%	11.0%	1.0%	30.9%	10.4%	2.7%	8.7%	1.5%	8.7%
31-10 July/August 2017	Focus	1,033	21.1%	14.4%	4.2%	21.8%	10.1%	2.7%	10.9%	4.2%	0.7%
6-15 June 2017	Focus	1,002	25.9%	16.2%	4.8%	20.0%	12.9%	2.8%	10.4%	6.6%	5.9%
24-7 January/February 2017	AKO	1,000	21.6%	10.1%	7.1%	9.3%	14.0%	7.9%	?	?	7.6%

=== Bratislava governorship ===
Date	Polling firm	Sample size	Milan Ftáčnik (independent)	Rudolf Kusý (independent)	Pavol Frešo (independent)	Juraj Droba (SaS)	Daniel Krajcer (SKOK)	Ján Mrva (independent)	Jozef Uhler (independent)	Natália Hanulíková (Greens)	Lead
6-18 October 2017	AKO	1,000	24.0%	18.5%	18.8%	14.6%	5.8%	8.5%	?%	?%	5.5%
28-6 September/October 2017	Focus	1,014	25.5%	19.0%	16.4%	14.1%	7.1%	6.1%	4.1%	2.0%	6.5%
13-18 September 2017	AKO	1,000	21.7%	15.0%	15.0%	15.2%	7.1%	6.7%	4.4%	3.6%	6.5%

=== Trnava governorship ===
Date	Polling firm	Sample size	Tibor Mikuš (SMER-SD)	Jozef Viskupič (OĽANO)	József Berényi (SMK)	Konrád Rigó (MOST)	Jaroslav Cehlárik (independent)	Lead
October 2017	AKO	1,000	40.8%	30.5%	12.1%	10.1%	6.5%	10.3%
