= 2013 Slovak regional elections =

Elections were held in Slovakia's eight self-governing regions on 9 November 2013. Elected were Regional Governors and City Councilors.

It was held on basis of 2 rounds if candidate haven't gained 50% of votes, if he gained the required percents, there would not be runoff. Only three candidates got elected in the first round, in Prešov, Žilina, and Trenčín Regions. There was runoff in Košice, Banská Bystrica, Nitra, Trnava, and Bratislava Regions.

Six of the regional presidencies were won by centre-left Direction – Social Democracy (Smer), with Bratislava Region being carried on by incumbent Governor Pavol Frešo of Slovak Democratic and Christian Union – Democratic Party.

The biggest surprise came in Banská Bystrica Region, where leader of the far-right People's Party – Our Slovakia, Marian Kotleba, got to the second round of elections to face off with incumbent Governor Vladimír Maňka of Smer. He then defeated Vladimír Maňka in the second round and won the runoff by 55,5 % (71 397 Regional votes) and became Governor of Banská Bystrica Region, and also ended as candidate with most votes to City Council of Banská Bystrica (8678 votes).

== Results ==
=== Presidencies ===
Region	Winner	Party	Endorsing parties
Bratislava	Pavol Frešo	SDKÚ-DS	KDH, Most–Híd, SaS, SMK, OKS, SZ
Trnava	Tibor Mikuš	Smer	SNS, KSS
Trenčín	Jaroslav Baška	Smer	Won the first round with over 50%.
Nitra	Milan Belica	Smer	SNS, ASV
Žilina	Juraj Blanár	Smer	Won the first round with over 50%.
Banská Bystrica	Marian Kotleba	ĽSNS	No endorsing parties.
Prešov	Peter Chudík	Smer	Won the first round with over 50%.
Košice	Zdenko Trebuľa	Smer	Most–Híd, SMK

=== Councils ===
Party	Bratislava	Trnava	Trenčín	Nitra	Žilina	Banská Bystrica	Prešov	Košice	Total	%
Smer	1	12	25	19	19	24	35	26	161 / 408	39.5
SDKÚ-DS	6	3	3	1	5	–	8	5	31 / 408	7.6
KDH	9	4	2	13	11	1	10	7	57 / 408	14.0
SMK	3	11	–	14	–	5	–	4	37 / 408	9.1
HZDS	–	–	–	–	2	1	–	–	3 / 408	0.7
SNS	–	–	–	1	3	1	–	–	5 / 408	1.2
ĽSNS	–	–	–	–	–	1	–	–	1 / 408	0.2
OKS	2	–	–	–	–	–	–	–	2 / 408	0.5
SaS	7	–	1	–	–	1	–	–	9 / 408	2.2
Most–Híd	7	4	1	1	–	–	1	3	17 / 408	4.2
NOVA	–	–	1	1	1	1	1	–	5 / 408	1.2
Other parties	3	–	1	–	–	1	1	1	7 / 408	1.7
Independents	6	6	11	4	16	13	6	11	73 / 408	17.9
Total	44	40	45	54	57	49	62	57	408	100
