= Grendel (disambiguation) =

Grendel is the antagonist in the Anglo-Saxon epic poem Beowulf.

Grendel or Grendal may also refer to:

In literature:

- "Grendel" (short story) by Larry Niven, written in 1968
- Grendel (novel), by John Gardner (1971) that retells Beowulf from Grendel's point of view
- Grendel (comics), a long-running series by Matt Wagner that started in the 1980s, featuring a fictional assassin called Grendel
- Grendel (Marvel Comics), an alien symbiote appearing in Marvel Comics
- Grendels, predatory alien species in the science-fiction novels The Legacy of Heorot (1987) and Beowulf's Children (1995)

In music:

- Grendel (band), a Netherlands-based dark electro/hard EBM band
- Grendel (opera), an opera composed by Elliot Goldenthal and directed by Julie Taymor
- "Grendel", a song by Marillion, B-side to their first single "Market Square Heroes"
- "Grendel", a song on the album Diary by Sunny Day Real Estate

In media:

- Grendel (film), a made-for-television motion picture adaptation of the Beowulf poem produced by the Sci Fi Channel
- Grendel Grendel Grendel, a 1981 animated film based on John Gardner's novel and starring Peter Ustinov
- Beowulf & Grendel, a 2005 film
- Grendel, the Holy City in the Scrapped Princess anime

In computing:

- Grendel, a species in the artificial life computer program Creatures
- Mozilla Grendel, a Java-based e-mail and Usenet client
- The NSDF designation given to the Soviet bomber class ship in Battlezone
- Grendal, a character in the computer game Mace: The Dark Age
- Grendel, a character in the computer game Warframe

People:

- Erik Grendel, Slovak footballer
- Gábor Grendel, Slovak politician
- Lajos Grendel, Slovak writer (1948 – 2018)
- Grendel Briarton, pseudonym for author Reginald Bretnor

Other uses:

- Grendel, a superheavyweight combat robot in BattleBots
- 6.5mm Grendel, a rifle cartridge developed by Alexander Arms
- Grendel Inc., a United States firearms manufacturer which produced among others:
  - Grendel P30
  - Grendel S16
- Grendel's Den, a bar and restaurant in Cambridge, Massachusetts, U.S.
- Mount Grendal, a mountain in Antarctica

== See also ==
- Beowulf (disambiguation)
- List of artistic depictions of Grendel
