= Anna Andrejuvová =

Slovak politician

Member of the National Council
- In office 20 March 2020 – 25 October 2023

Personal details
- Born: 5 January 1980 (age 46) Svidník, Czechoslovakia (now Slovakia)
- Party: NOVA; Ordinary People and Independent Personalities
- Education: University of Trnava; Pan-European University

Anna Andrejuvová (born 5 January 1980 in Svidník) is a Slovak politician serving as a member of the National Council in the Ordinary People and Independent Personalities caucus since 2020.

== Early life ==
Andrejuvová grew up in Svidník and Bardejov. In 2004 she graduated in political science at the University of Trnava. In 2009 she graduated in law at the Pan-European University.

== Political career ==
From 2012 to 2020 she served as an aide to MP Daniel Lipšic. In the 2020 Slovak parliamentary election, she was elected an MP on the Ordinary People and Independent Personalities list.
