= Juraj Šeliga =

Slovak politician

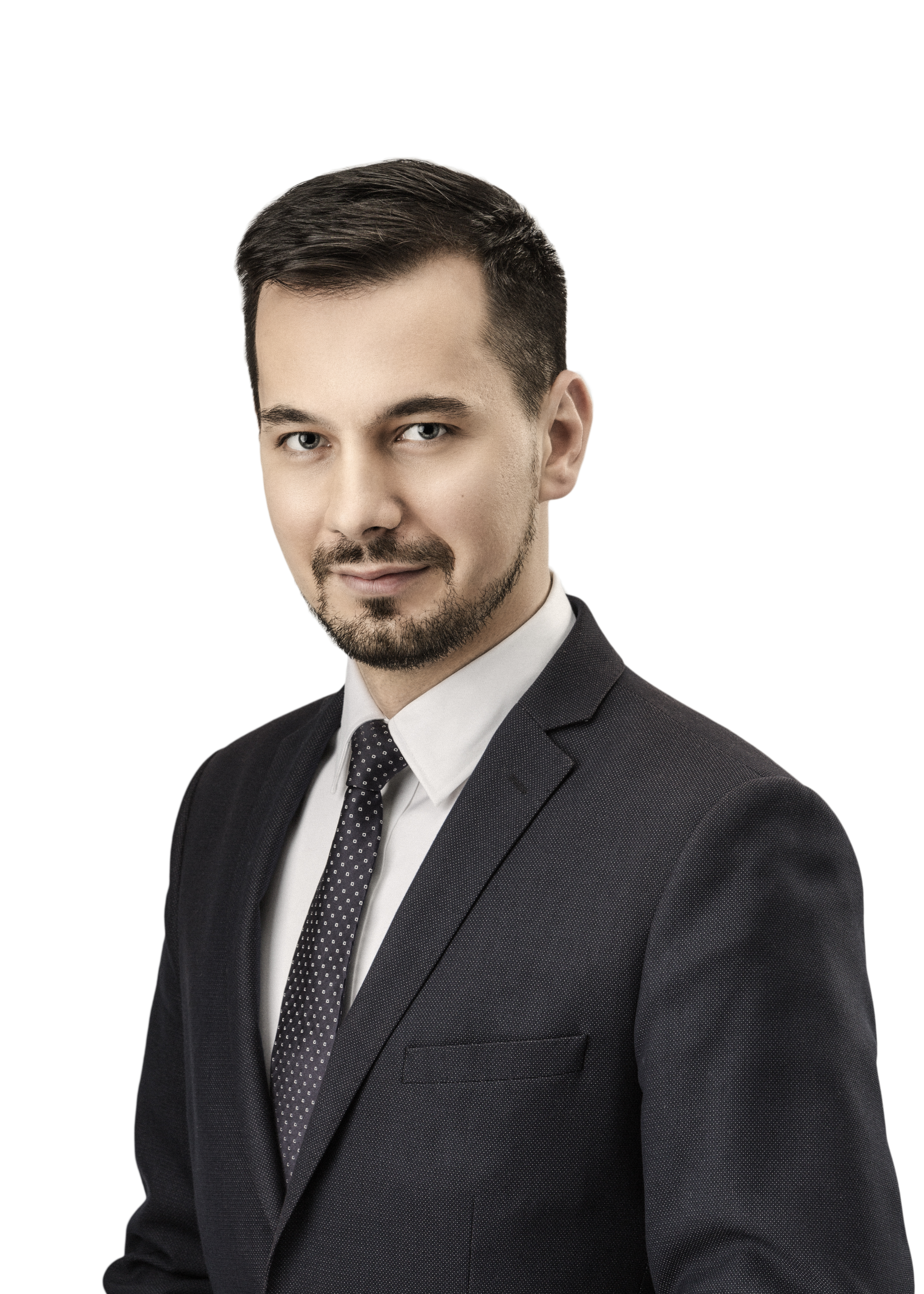

Member of the Slovak National Council
- In office 20 March 2020 – 25 October 2023

Deputy Speaker of the Slovak National Council
- In office 20 March 2020 – 5 May 2021 Serving with Gábor Grendel, Milan Laurenčík and Peter Pellegrini
- Speaker: Boris Kollár

Personal details
- Born: 16 August 1990 (age 34); Dolný Kubín, Czechoslovakia
- Political party: For the People (2019–2023); Democrats (2023–)
- Education: University of Trnava

Juraj Šeliga (born 16 August 1990) is a Slovak politician, activist and lawyer. He served as a Member of the National Council from 2020 until 2023, as well as Deputy Speaker of the council between 2020 and 2021.

== Early life ==
Born 16 August 1990 Dolný Kubín, Šeliga studied law at the University of Trnava, where he obtained a PhD degree. As a student, Šeliga worked as an aide to the MP Pavel Abrhan.

== Activism ==
Šeliga worked with the NGO Via Juris to improve the functioning of judiciary in Slovakia. In 2017, he founded the civic initiative Remember (Slovak: Pamätaj) to oppose the weakening of the National Memory Institute and promote the study of crimes of totalitarian regime. Following the murder of Ján Kuciak, Šeliga was one of the main organizers of massive anti-government protests where he refused any political ambitions in the future.

== Political career ==
In June 2019, Šeliga was one of the co-founders of For the People led by the president Andrej Kiska, serving as deputy chairman until March 2023. He became deputy speaker in the 2020 Slovak parliamentary election.

In May 2021, Šeliga resigned as Deputy Speakership after pictures of him, his fellow MP Jana Žitňanská, and the governor of the Bratislava region Juraj Droba spending time together in a restaurant that should have been deleted due to the COVID-19 pandemic were published by the tabloid press.

Šeliga faced particular criticism of his conduct because he had been a staunch defender of the anti-pandemic policies of the government.

In March 2023, Šeliga and Žitňanská left the For the People, later joining Democrats party by Eduard Heger.
