= Ján Lunter =

Slovak entrepreneur and politician (born 1951)

Governor of Banská Bystrica Region
- Incumbent
- Assumed office 4 December 2017
- Preceded by: Marian Kotleba

Personal details
- Born: 15 July 1951 (age 75) Telgárt, Czechoslovakia
- Party: Independent
- Spouse: Etela
- Children: Ján; Jakub; Juraj; Ondrej; Anna; Mária
- Education: School of Electrical Engineering at the Slovak University of Technology in Bratislava

Ján Lunter (born 15 July 1951) is a Slovak entrepreneur, owner of a family food company and, following the November 2017 elections, governor of the Banská Bystrica Region.

== Biography ==
Lunter studied Cybernetics at the School of Electrical Engineering at the Slovak University of Technology in Bratislava. Following the gentle revolution, he started a firm producing computer software and hardware, called Proces, and later started a food processing company called Alfa-Bio. In 2016 Alfa-Bio produced 160 tons of tofu and 100 tons of spreads.

== Candidacy ==
Lunter announced plans to run for governor of the Banská Bystrica Region in January and officially entered the race in April 2017. By the end of August, Lunter had gained the support of Peter Pellegrini of Direction - Social Democracy, and later won support from Most–Híd and Progressive Slovakia. As candidates from other parties withdrew, many gave support to Lunter, including Martin Klus, who withdrew on 3 October; and Viliam Baňák, who withdrew on 4 October. By November, Lunter had support of all parties excluding the far-right Kotleba - People's Party Our Slovakia (the party of incumbent governor Marian Kotleba).
