= Slovak Togetherness =

Far-right organization in Slovakia

Slovak Togetherness – National Party Slovenská pospolitosť – Národná strana
- Abbreviation: SP-NS
- Leader: Marian Kotleba
- Founded: 1996 (as movement)
- Registered: 18 January 2005 (as party)
- Banned: 14 March 2006
- Succeeded by: People's Party Our Slovakia
- Headquarters: Kráľovohoľská 6150/5, 97411 Banská Bystrica
- Newspaper: Hlas národnej stráže, Prúty
- Ideology: Slovak nationalism Pan-European nationalism Anti-communism; Antiziganism; Anti-Zionism; Euroscepticism; Neo-Nazism; Neo-Fascism
- Political position: Far-right
- European affiliation: European National Front (associate)
- Colours: Dark blue White
- Slogan: Na stráž

Party flag

Website
- pospolitost.org pospolitost.wordpress.com

The Slovak Togetherness (Slovak: Slovenská pospolitosť) was a civil society group in Slovakia. The group has been characterised as "extremist."

== History ==
=== Creation ===
Slovenská pospolitosť was formed in 1996 to bring together sections of the local far right population and place them under the leadership of more astute ideologues. The group has links to the International Third Position and has posted details of its activities on their websites.

=== Governmental suppression ===
The movement has come under increasing pressure from the government of Slovakia in 2005, to the extent where the leading member Ján Kopunek has claimed that the Slovak police have been ordered to crush the group entirely. Since then, Marian Kotleba has been charged with hate crimes in absentia. Later, Kotleba was charged for finishing one of his speeches with "Na stráž!" the phrase used in the fascist Hlinka Guard. After that the charges were dropped as it "couldn't be proven that the phrase itself constitutes the promotion of fascism". However the American embassy in Bratislava characterised the group's activities as "commemorating the wartime fascist state and to spread messages of intolerance against ethnic and religious minorities."

=== Dissolution and continuance ===
In 2006, Kotleba tried to transform the group into a political party (Slovak Togetherness - National Party). The party was dissolved by the Supreme Court because of its non-compliance with the Constitution (restriction of universal suffrage by replacement of the party system with corporatism, with national minorities being represented into a category grouping all minorities, and have Parliament representation only if their home country had a Slovak parlementiary representation) as the first and yet only dissolved political party in the modern history of Slovakia. The group then continued to exist as a civil society. Also in this form it was temporarily banned by the Interior Ministry for "activities that incite hatred and national, racial, religious as well as political intolerance", but the Slovak Supreme Court reinstated the group, claiming that "the legal conditions for disbanding Slovenská Pospolitosť had not been met."

The group resumes operation unhindered.

== Controversy ==
In August 2009 the group led a march in protest at the local Roma community during which members threw rocks and bottles at police, resulting in over 30 arrests and seven injuries.

== Foreign relations ==
They have been associated with the European National Front and support their ideas of Pan-European nationalist unity. They hosted a meeting for some affiliated groups in 2004.
