= Na stráž =

Czech and Slovak phrase

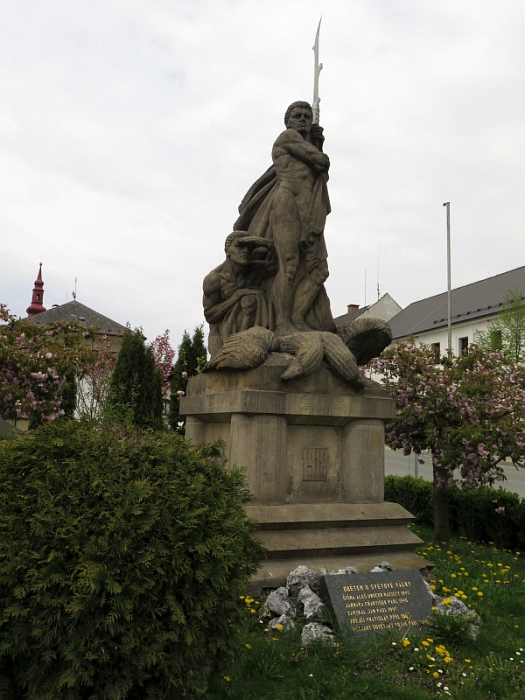
"Na stráž" memorial to fallen soldiers in Třeština, Czech Republic.

The Slovak phrase na stráž (meaning "on guard") is sometimes associated with far-right politics in Slovakia. It has been described as "the Slovak version of Heil Hitler".

During the era of the Slovak State, the phrase was used informally as a greeting by Hlinka Guard members. The phrase was also used by Slovak Ústredie slovenských katolíckych skautov (Headquarters of Slovak Catholic Scouts) and Czech Sokol movement at the beginning of the 20th century. The Sokol badge from 1907 became the most widespread Sokol badge.

Marian Kotleba habitually employed the phrase during his early political career. In 2014, his party tried to register the civic organization "Ľudová stráž", which was rejected due to its far right connotation. In January 2020, Kotleba Party candidate Anton Grňo was fined 5,000 euros for voicing the greeting at a 2018 demonstration in front of the Supreme Court of Slovakia, because the court considered this equivalent to voicing support for the Slovak State regime. He appealed.

== See also ==
- Za dom spremni, a Croatian fascist slogan
