= Rovné, Rimavská Sobota District =

Rovné Rónapatak
- Municipality
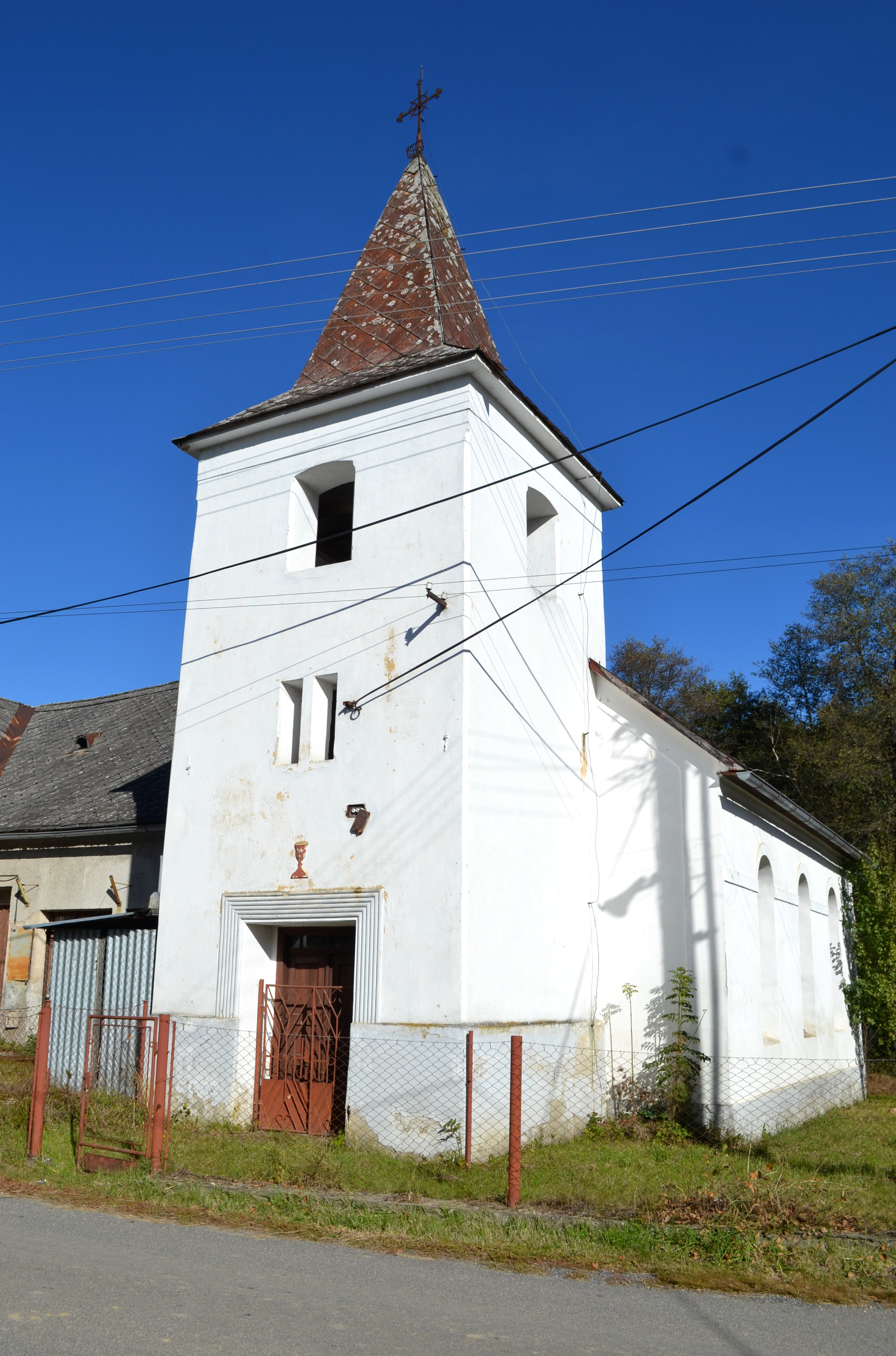

- Flag

- Location of Rovné in the Banská Bystrica Region Location of Rovné in Slovakia
- Coordinates: 48.50°N 20.05°E
- Country: Slovakia
- Region: Banská Bystrica Region
- District: Rimavská Sobota District
- First mentioned: 1413

Area
  - Total: 9.15 km^{2} (3.53 sq mi)
- Elevation: 383 m (1,257 ft)

Population (2025)
  - Total: 103
- Time zone: UTC+1 (CET)
  - Summer (DST): UTC+2 (CEST)
- Postal code: 982 67
- Area code: +421 47
- Vehicle registration plate (until 2022): RS
- Website: www.obecrovne.sk

Rovné (Hungarian: Rónapatak) is a village and municipality in the Rimavská Sobota District of the Banská Bystrica Region of southern Slovakia. It is located in the northern part of the district, about 14 km from Hnúšťa. A magnesite mine had been working in Rovné. In the village is a post office, foodstuff store and a football pitch.

== Ratkovská Zdychava ==
The previously independent nearby village of Ratkovská Zdychava was merged into Rovné in 1960.

== Population ==
Population statistic (10 years)
Year	1995	2005	2015	2025
Count	179	155	130	103
Difference		−13.40%	−16.12%	−20.76%

Population statistic
Year	2024	2025
Count	106	103
Difference		−2.83%

It has a population of 103 people (31 December 2025).

=== Ethnicity ===
Census 2021 (1+ %)
Ethnicity	Number	Fraction
Slovak	117	99.15%
Total	118	

In year 2021 was 118 people by ethnicity 117 as Slovak, 1 as Romani and 1 as Not found out.

Note on population: The difference values of population numbers in the table "Population statistic" and in the sections "Ethnicity" & "Religion" is caused by the use of various statistical methods.

=== Religion ===
Census 2021 (1+ %)
Religion	Number	Fraction
Evangelical Church	45	38.14%
None	45	38.14%
Roman Catholic Church	23	19.49%
Not found out	4	3.39%
Total	118	

In year 2021 was 118 people by religion 45 from Evangelical Church, 45 from None, 23 from Roman Catholic Church, 4 from Not found out and 1 from Church of the Brethren.

== Notable people ==
- Milan Urbáni (1944–2024) - politician
