= Jana Žitňanská =

Slovak politician

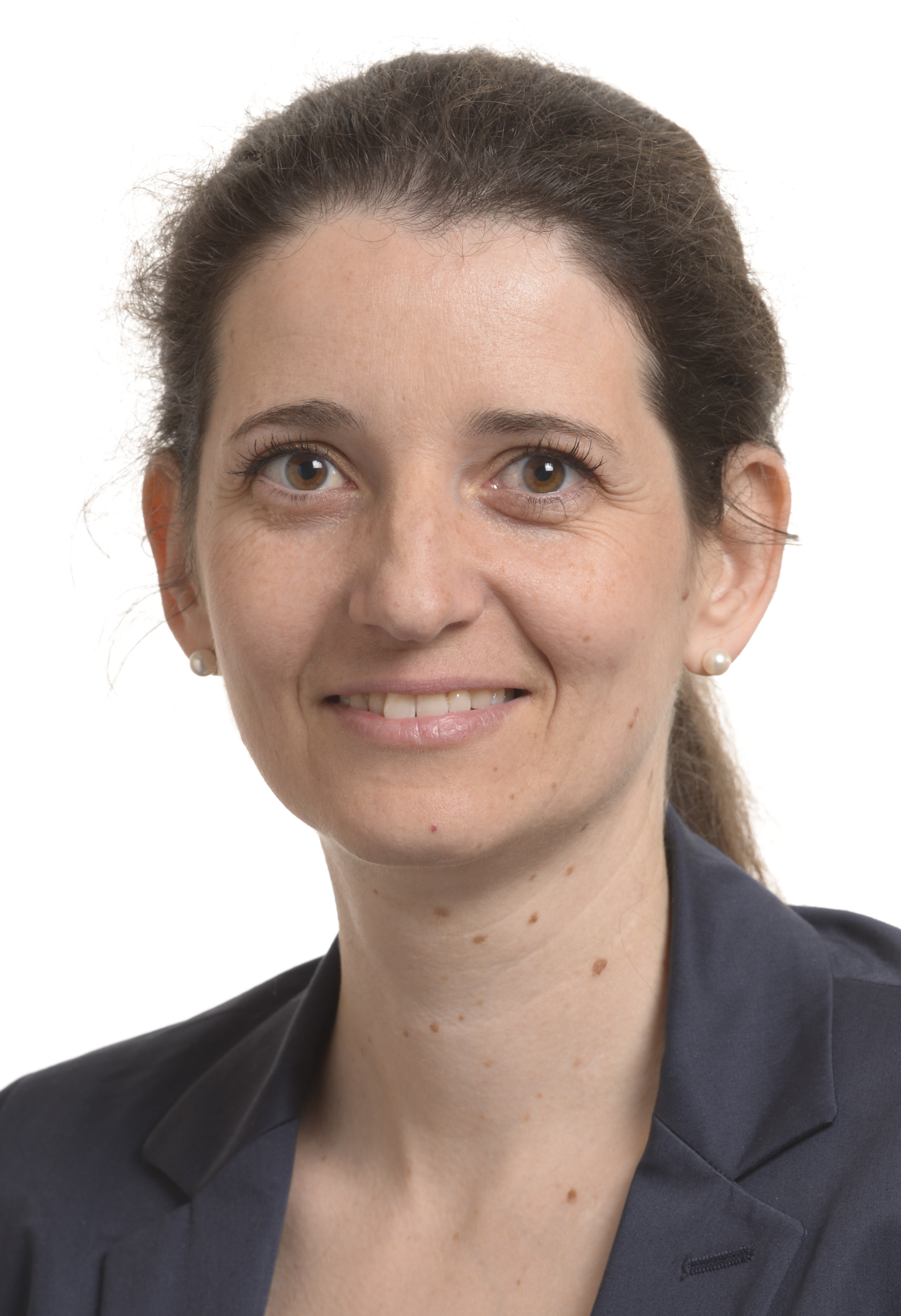

Member of the European Parliament for Slovakia
- In office 2 July 2014 – 1 July 2019

Member of the National Council
- In office 20 March 2020 – 25 October 2023
- In office 8 July 2010 – 1 July 2014

Personal details
- Born: 17 May 1974 (age 51) Bratislava, Czechoslovakia (now Slovakia)
- Party: Democrats (from 2023)
- Other political affiliations: Christian Democratic Movement (1998–2012); New Majority (2012–2019); For the People (2019–2023)
- Occupation: Politician
- Profession: Journalist

Jana Žitňanská (born 17 May 1974) is a Slovak journalist and politician. She has been a Member of the European Parliament since 2014 as well as the European Conservatives and Reformists (ECR). Žitňanská worked as a member of the Broadcasting and Retransmission Council between 2001 and 2007.

== Political career ==
=== Early political career ===
Žitňanská held the position of vice-president of KDH until from 1998 until 28 May 2012, after which she joined Gábor Grendel with establishing the political party NOVA and served as vice-president.

In the 2014 European Parliament election, Žitňanská ran in second place as a candidate for the coalition of parties NOVA, KDS, and OKS. On 12 February 2019, Žitňanská announced that she would not run again in the EP elections in European Parliament election that year, citing her desire to change Slovakia's approach to disabled people and their families.

=== For the People and Democrats ===
In 2019, Žitňanská joined For the People, a newly-established party of former president Andrej Kiska. She was elected vice-president of the party at its constituent assembly on 28 September 2019. Žitňanská ran from fourth place of For the People candidate in the 2020 Slovak parliamentary election, receiving 50,646 preferential votes and moved to third place. Upon the dissolution of the parliamentary club, Žitňanská continued to work as an unaffiliated member of the party until 31 March 2023, when she resigned from the party together with deputy Juraj Šeliga.

Both Žitňanská and Šeliga joined Democrats upon leaving For the People, with the former being an unclassified member of the Democrats in the National Council of the Slovakia. Democrats won 2.93% of the votes in the parliamentary elections in September 2023 and did not make it to the council; Žitňanská received 19,686 preferential votes.
