= Milan Urbáni =

Slovak politician (1944–2024)

Member of the National Council
- In office 15 October 2002 – 8 July 2010

Personal details
- Born: 21 August 1944 Ratkovská Zdychava, Slovak Republic
- Died: 17 June 2024 (aged 79) Banská Bystrica, Slovakia
- Party: Movement for a Democratic Slovakia
- Education: Pavol Jozef Šafárik University

Milan Urbáni (21 August 1944 – 17 June 2024) was a Slovak physician and politician. From 2002 to 2010, he served as an MP of the National Council of Slovakia.

== Biography ==
Milan Urbáni was born on 21 August 1944 in the village of Ratkovská Zdychava in the Rimavská Sobota district. He studied medicine at the Pavol Jozef Šafárik University, graduating in 1967. Following his graduation he practiced as a gynecologist in Banská Bystrica. In the 1970s and 1980s, he practiced medicine in Zambia and Libya. In 1991, he returned to Banská Bystrica, where he practiced until his death.

In the 2002 Slovak parliamentary election, Urbáni won a seat in the National Council of the electoral list of the Movement for a Democratic Slovakia (HZDS). In 2009, Urbáni was implicated in a corruption scandal and subsequently expelled from HZDS. He served as an independent MP for the rest of his term, until the 2010 Slovak parliamentary election.

Urbáni ran in the 2017 Slovak regional elections for the position of the Governor of the Banská Bystrica Region, but only received 1.21% of the vote.

== Death ==
Urbáni died on 17 June 2024, at the age of 79.
