= Double Cross Vodka =

Slovak spirit brand

- Type: Vodka
- Manufacturer: DCV Investors, LLC
- Origin: Slovak Republic
- Introduced: 2008
- Proof (US): 80
- Related products: List of vodkas
- Website: doublecrossvodka.com

Double Cross Vodka is a brand of distilled spirit produced in the town of Stará Ľubovňa, located in the Tatra Mountains in northeastern Slovakia.

== Production ==
Double Cross Vodka is produced in Stará Ľubovňa in northeastern Slovakia using estate-grown winter wheat and natural spring water from the Tatra Mountains. The vodka is distilled seven times and filtered seven times, including a diamond-dust filtration stage designed to achieve high purity and a clean finish.

== Accolades ==
Both the vodka and the bottle design have earned a variety of awards and attention in the consumer and business press.

In 2008, Double Cross won a gold medal for taste and a gold medal for package design at the San Francisco World Spirits Competition.

Wine Enthusiast gave Double Cross a rare 95-point "Highly Recommended" review and also included Double Cross in it selection of "Top 50 Spirits from 2009 F. Paul Pacult, in his industry publication Spirit Journal, gave Double Cross a 4-star/”Highly Recommended” review. while Anthony Dias Blue gave Double Cross an “Outstanding” review in the Tasting Panel Magazine.

Playboy magazine said "rare that we single out a vodka for praise, but we'll make an exception for Double Cross."

== History ==
The company was founded by Malcolm Lloyd and John Gellner who began working with Jan Krak, a master distiller in Slovakia near the Polish border. The Slovak end of the business was developed by Eduard Heger, who is now prime minister, and Juraj Droba, who is now governor of the Bratislava region.

== Brand revival (2024–present) ==
In 2024, Double Cross Vodka announced a change in ownership and leadership as part of a broader strategic revival. The brand was acquired by DCV Investors, LLC, and Harry McKaig was appointed Chief Executive Officer.

The company introduced a renewed market strategy focusing on key U.S. states including New York, New Jersey, and Florida, along with expanded digital and e-commerce initiatives designed to increase consumer access.

The revival emphasized maintaining the brand’s Slovak production heritage, including its use of local winter wheat, Tatra Mountain spring water, and its seven-times distillation and seven-times filtration process.

== News ==
Dr. Malcolm Lloyd, the 42-year-old CEO of Old Nassau Imports and Double Cross Vodka, died in a car crash in Miami Beach on Thursday, April 24, 2014.
