= Renáta Kaščáková =

Slovak politician (born 1965)

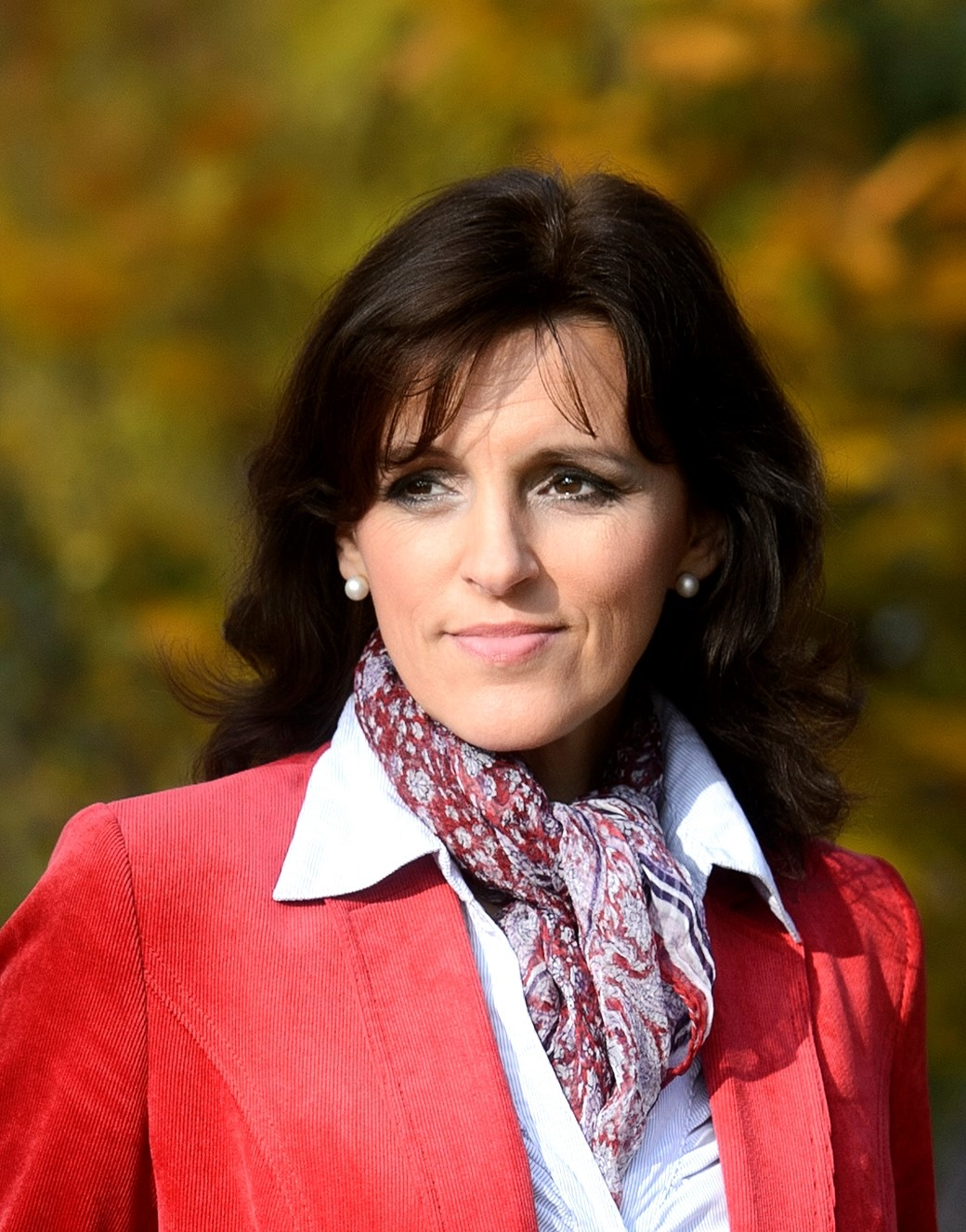

Member of the National Council
- In office 23 March 2016 – 20 February 2020

Personal details
- Born: 28 October 1965 (age 60) Trenčín, Czechoslovakia
- Party: Freedom and Solidarity
- Education: Comenius University

Renáta Kaščáková (born 28 October 1965) is a Slovak politician. She served as a member of the National Council from 2016 to 2020 representing the Freedom and Solidarity party.

== Early life ==
Kaščáková was born in Trenčín. She studied English and Italian language at the Comenius University. After graduation she worked as an interpreter. Between 2003 and 2016, she worked in the Trenčín municipality.

== Political career ==
In 2009 Kaščáková was a founding member of the Freedom and Solidarity party. In 2010 she successfully ran in the municipal elections in Trenčín. From 2011 to 2012 she served as the deputy mayor of Trenčín. In 2012, she was elected to the Trenčín Region assembly.

In the 2016 Slovak parliamentary election, Kaščáková won a parliamentary seat.

Kaščáková ran in the 2017 Slovak regional elections for the position of Governor of the Trenčín region as the candidate of united opposition, but was defeated in a landslide by the incombent Jaroslav Baška.

In 2019 she left the party along with nine other MPs and joined the Democratic Party. In the 2020 Slovak parliamentary election, she ran on the Democratic party ticket but failed to retain her seat as the party received only 0.15% of the vote.
