= Lajos Grendel =

Slovak writer (1948–2018)

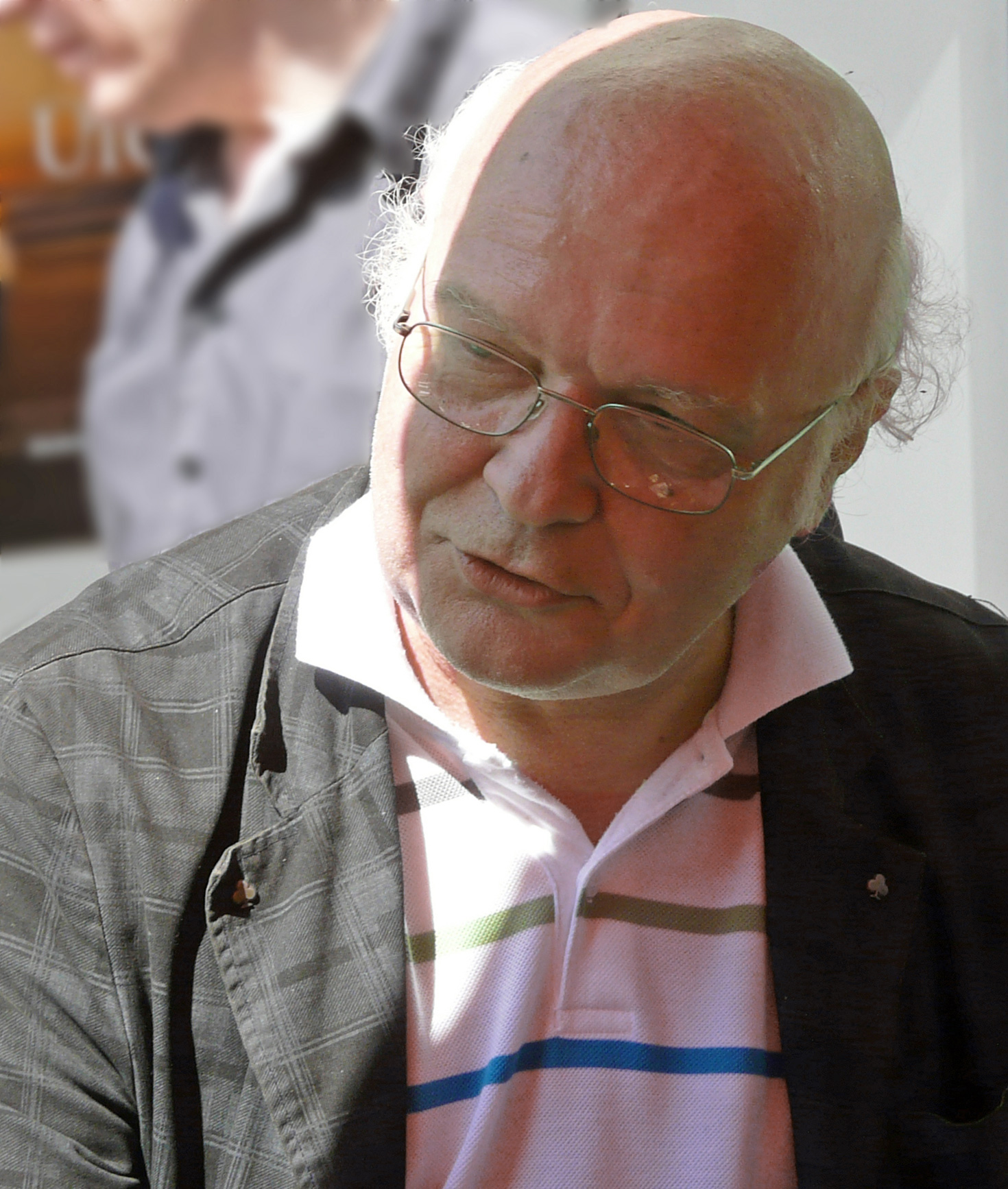
- Grendel in 2010
- Born: 6 April 1948 Levice, Czechoslovakia
- Died: 18 December 2018 (aged 70)
- Education: Comenius University
- Genre: Novel
- Spouse: Ágota Grendel
- Children: Zsuzsa Grendel; Gábor Grendel

Lajos Grendel (6 April 1948 – 18 December 2018) was a Slovak writer of Hungarian ethnicity. He published chiefly in his native Hungarian language and was among the most prominent representatives of Hungarian literature in Slovakia.

In his writing, Grendel heavily utilized humor, irony and absurdity, taking inspiration from magic realism. Several of his stories take place in the factious village of New Hont, where the mundane daily struggles of the locals are juxtaposed with major historical events.

Grendel studied Hungarian and English at the Comenius University. Following his graduation, he was employed in the Madach Hungarian-language publishing house. Following the Velvet Revolution, he became politically active, serving as an MP of the final term of the Third Slovak National Council (1990–1992). In 1994, he became the editor of the Kalligram publishing house. He also taught at the Comenius University.

The 541982 Grendel minor planet discovered in 2012 is named after Lajos Grendel.

He was married to the journalist Ágota Grendel (née Sebők). They had two children – Zsuzsa and Gábor.
