= Daniel Lipšic =

Slovak politician and jurist

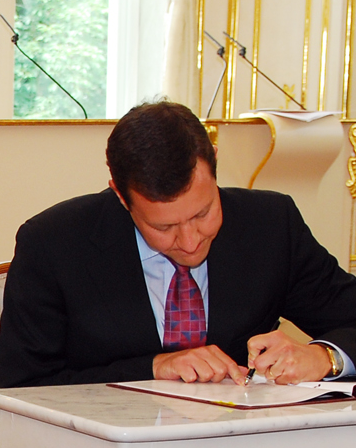

Minister of Justice
- In office 15 October 2002 – 7 February 2006
- Prime Minister: Mikuláš Dzurinda
- Preceded by: Ján Čarnogurský
- Succeeded by: Lucia Žitňanská

Minister of Interior
- In office 8 July 2010 – 4 April 2012
- Prime Minister: Iveta Radičová
- Preceded by: Robert Kaliňák
- Succeeded by: Robert Kaliňák

Special Prosecutor of Slovakia
- In office 15 February 2021 – 20 March 2024
- Preceded by: Dušan Kováčik
- Succeeded by: Office abolished

Member of the National Council
- In office 4 April 2012 – 1 October 2016
- In office 7 February 2006 – 8 July 2010

Chairman of New Majority
- In office 25 October 2012 – 30 January 2017
- Preceded by: Office established
- Succeeded by: Gábor Grendel

Personal details
- Born: 8 July 1973 (age 53) Bratislava, Czechoslovakia
- Party: Christian Democratic Movement (1998-2012); New Majority (2012-2017)
- Spouse: Beáta Oravcová
- Children: Alexander; Peter
- Education: Comenius University in Bratislava; University of Minnesota; Georgetown University; Harvard Law School
- Website: www.lipsic.sk

Daniel Lipšic (born 8 July 1973) is a Slovak politician and Jurist. He is a former Deputy Prime Minister, Minister of Justice and former Minister of Interior. Until 28 May 2012 he was a member of the Christian Democratic Movement (KDH), in which he served as vice-president and a Member of Parliament. Through his legal and political career, he is noted for his hard-line stance regarding officials from the former communist Czechoslovak regime, as well as crimes committed during this period. A public anti-corruption activist, he is outspoken against perceived corruption in the political or financial sphere.

In May 2012, in the aftermath of the electoral defeat of the Radičová cabinet, Lipšic together with Jana Žitňanská and Gabor Grendel, left the KDH and formed a new political party called NOVA (Slovak: Nová väčšina – Dohoda). He currently serves as its president.

== Early life ==
Daniel Lipšic was born on 8 July 1973 in Bratislava into a family of physicians and doctors. Both his parents, along with his twin brother Erik and all of his cousins are medical doctors, and Lipšic grew up aspiring to be a doctor, saying:"I always thought I would be a doctor too, since during communism a career in law was restricted. But after the Velvet revolution things changed."

=== Education ===
He attended secondary school (Slovak: Gymnazium) at the Grösslingová 18 Upper Secondary School. He enrolled at the Law Faculty at the Comenius University in Bratislava in 1991, graduating in 1996.

During his time in University he also spent time at the University of Minnesota Law School in Minneapolis and Georgetown University Law Center in Washington DC. In 1998 he attended Harvard Law School on a Fulbright scholarship, graduating in 2000 with a Master of Laws or LL.M.

== Legal career ==
During his mandatory military service between 1997 and 1998 he served at the District Military Prosecutor's Office in Prešov. After his military service, he was employed at the Law Firm Valko & Partners, as an expert in bankruptcy law. In 1999, he was appointed as Head of the Legal Office at the Ministry of Justice by then Minister Jan Carnogursky, where he was tasked with documenting and investigating crimes from the former Czechoslovak communist regime, which contained over 70.0000 individual cases. He was an outspoken proponent of the prosecuting the Slovak politicians responsible for the Warsaw Pact invasion of Czechoslovakia, which he called "the greatest crime in the past 50 years of Slovak history." Specifically he targeted former hardline communist leader Vasiľ Biľak, who was accused of signing the official document "inviting" soviet forces to invade. Bil'ak, died in 2014 aged 94, his trial stopped due to lack of witnesses.

He was also tasked with authoring laws, enabling the government to effectively combat organized crime, as well as legislation introducing stiffer penalties for violent criminals, including a Three-strikes law system which will send people convicted of three violent crimes to jail for life without parole. Commenting on this, Lipsic stated that some developed western countries had given up trying to re-educate violent criminals, and were concentrating instead on "protecting society from serious criminals." In addition, Lipšic authored anti-corruption legislation which gave tougher penalties on graft and outlawed bribery for the first time in Slovakia.

On 1 April 2002, Daniel Lipšic resigned from his post as the head of the Legal Office at the Justice Ministry. This was due to a revised State Service Law which took effect that day, banning state bureaucrats below the level of deputy minister from being members of political parties. Lipšic, a member of the ruling coalition Christian Democrats (KDH), chose to remain with the party, and resigned.

== Political career ==
While still studying law at the university, he served as the President of the right-wing youth organization Civic Democratic Youth, which was established in 1991. As chairman of the CDY, he was also present at the 6th National Congress of the Christian Democratic Movement (KDH), which took place on 23–24 October 1993 in Ruzomberok. On 1998, he became a member of the party.

=== Minister of Justice ===
In the 2002 Slovak parliamentary election he was placed 6th on the party list and received 42,727 preferential votes (18.01% share ), that placed fourth behind Pavol Hrusovsky, Ján Figel 'and Vladimír Palko. His mandate did not apply because he became a member of the Government as a cabinet minister following the election. From 15 October 2002 he held the post of Deputy Prime Minister and Minister of Justice.

During his reign, the District Court of Bratislava 1 issued a preliminary measure declaring that the railway strike in February 2003 was illegal and needed to be ended immediately. However, the Constitutional Court later affirmed the right of railway workers to strike. Article 37 of the Slovak Republic's Constitution, within the section on Economic, Social, and Cultural Rights, guarantees citizens the right to freedom of association for their economic and social interests and ensures the right to strike.

Continuing anti-communist policies of his predecessor, Lipsic unsuccessfully attempted to introduce a law, banning Judges who had worked under the former communist regime from the judiciary. He also attempted to prosecute members of the judiciary who had ruled in political trials under the communist regime. The plan was unequivocally rejected by Slovakia's top judicial authorities, who argued that the law, if passed, would come much too late.

In connection with the withdrawal of KDH from the ruling coalition on 7 February 2006, all KDH cabinet ministers resigned. Subsequently, on 8 February he was replaced as of Minister of Justice by Lucia Zitnanska from the SDKU. This political move KDH was associated with disapproval of the draft contract between the Slovak Republic and the Holy See regarding the right to objection of conscience, which concerns the armed forces, health, education and training, legal services and labor relations. In early parliamentary elections, held on 17 June 2006, the KDH became part of the opposition. Lipšic in these elections received the second highest number of preferential votes - 86,536 (45.20%).

=== Minister of the Interior ===
After the parliamentary elections in 2010, and the resignation of the Fico Cabinet on 9 July. Lipšic became a member of the cabinet of Iveta Radičová as Minister of the Interior. After the 2012 Slovak parliamentary election which saw the governing coalition fell, Lipšic resigned.

While at the Ministry of the Interior, an anonymous source alleged that Lipšic had connections with an Israeli secret agent. This led to "an outburst of antisemitic and anti-Israeli comments in the media". It has been considered the first antisemitic attack on an influential politician in the history of the Slovak Republic.

== Personal life ==
He currently resides in Bratislava with his family. Along with his native Slovak, Lipšic speaks English, German and Russian.

=== Family ===
He is married to television presenter Beata Lipšicová (née Oravcová). Together they have sons Alexander, and Peter. He has a twin brother named Erik, who is a specialist in internal medicine and is currently working as a cardiologist in Groningen in the Netherlands.

=== Involvement in fatal car accident ===
On 19 September 2016, while driving home from work through the Bratislava III neighborhood, his Skoda Superb struck a 72- year old pedestrian crossing the street. The man was transported to the hospital, but he later succumbed to his injuries at University Hospital Bratislava. A test carried out at the place of the accident proved Lipšic was not under the influence of alcohol when driving. Lipšic expressed his regret and offered help to the man's family. He confirmed that he was driving the car, saying he was not driving fast. He noticed the man shortly before the incident. Days later Lipsic announced that he would resign his parliamentary seat due to the case being under police investigation, saying "I would not be able to do my job fully anymore", On 23 January 2017, the Bratislava Police confirmed that Lipsic would be charged with unlawful killing following the accident.

== Bibliography ==
- Lipšic, Daniel. Bicameral parliamentary system (Slovak: Dvojkomorový parlamentný systém). Bratislava : Inštitút pre verejné otázky, 2000. 43 s. ISBN 80-8893-516-4.
- Lipšic, Daniel. Slovakia needs a decent leadership (Slovak: Slušné Slovensko potrebuje lídra). Bratislava : NOVA, 2013. 174 s. ISBN 978-80-89402-62-5.
