= People's Party Our Slovakia =

Far-right Slovak political party

Kotlebists – People's Party Our Slovakia Kotlebovci – Ľudová strana naše Slovensko
- Abbreviation: ĽSNS
- Leader: Marian Kotleba
- Founded: 22 February 2010; 16 years ago
- Preceded by: Slovak Togetherness
- Headquarters: Nový svet 5667/63, Banská Bystrica
- Newspaper: Naše Slovensko (Our Slovakia)
- Youth wing: Ľudová mládež (People's Youth)
- Membership (2025): 1,483 (▲523)
- Ideology: Neo-Nazism; Right-wing populism; Ultranationalism; Anti-Americanism; Hard Euroscepticism; Russophilia
- Political position: Far-right
- European affiliation: Alliance for Peace and Freedom
- European Parliament group: Non-Inscrits (2019–2024)
- Colours: Green
- Slogan: S Odvahou Proti Systému ('With Courage Against the System')
- Anthem: "Hej, Slováci" ('Hey, Slovaks')full song
- National Council: 0 / 150
- European Parliament: 0 / 15
- Regional Presidents: 0 / 8
- Regional parliaments: 0 / 408
- Mayors (Note: Includes electoral coalition candidates based on 2018 electoral performance): 1 / 2,904
- Local councillors (Note: Includes electoral coalition candidates based on 2018 electoral performance): 75 / 20,686

Party flag

Website
- kotlebovci.sk

Kotlebists – People's Party Our Slovakia (Slovak: Kotlebovci – Ľudová strana naše Slovensko, ĽSNS) is a far-right, neo-Nazi political party in Slovakia. The party claims to derive its origin from the legacy of Andrej Hlinka and Jozef Tiso.

Positioned on the far-right of the political spectrum, Kotlebists – People's Party Our Slovakia's political platform describes itself as an anti-establishment, anti-oligarchic party. Opposition to the party have described their party as fascist, expressing xenophobic and antiziganist rhetoric. Some key policies of the party include interest-free national loans, replacement of the euro currency with the Slovak koruna, strengthening of law and order, rejection and criminalization of same-sex civil unions and LGBT rights, and strong anti-establishment sentiment, most notably against Slovakia's current foreign and domestic policy.

The party proposes to reduce the number of MPs from 150 to 100, restrict the expression of "degenerate material" in media, establish a home guard militia with the goal of cracking down on "gypsy criminality", promote a corporatist mixed economy, prohibit abortion conducted in the second and third trimester, institute a national health service, subsidize families in accordance to their fertility and race, and withdraw the Slovak military from foreign operations. In addition, it advocates for Slovakia's departure from the European Union, the European Monetary Union, and NATO; instead favouring closer ties with the Russian Federation and the CSTO.

== Party's names ==
- 20 October 2000 – 18 May 2009: Party of the Friends of Wine (Slovak: Strana priateľov vína)
- 18 May 2009 – 22 February 2010: People's Party of Social Solidarity (Slovak: Ľudová strana sociálnej solidarity)
- 22 February 2010 – 9 November 2015: People's Party Our Slovakia (Slovak: Ľudová strana Naše Slovensko)
- 9 November 2015 – 12 November 2019: Kotleba – People's Party Our Slovakia (Slovak: Kotleba – Ľudová strana Naše Slovensko)
- From 12 November 2019: Kotlebists – People's Party Our Slovakia (Slovak: Kotlebovci – Ľudová strana Naše Slovensko)

== History ==
The origins of the party are closely related to the ultra-nationalist Slovak Togetherness organization, which has been accused by opposition of holding racist and anti-semitic positions. The members of the movement tried to run in the 2006 elections under the name Slovak Togetherness – National Party, which was forcibly dissolved by the Supreme Court on grounds of anti-constitutional and anti-democratic activities.

Instead of founding an entirely new party, former members of Slovak Togetherness, under the leadership of Marian Kotleba, infiltrated the tiny Party of the Friends of Wine that had existed since 2000, changed its name to People's Party of Social Solidarity in May 2009, and then finally altered it to People's Party – Our Slovakia in early 2010. This was done to avoid the legal difficulties with registering a new party under this name given that a different party called Our Slovakia already existed.

Milan Uhrík and a few other ĽSNS representatives would leave the LSNS and form the Republic Movement in 2021 after disagreements over the declining support for the party.

== Ties to fascism and far-right extremism ==
From top: Hlinka's Slovak People's Party flag, Kotleba's former flag and Kotleba's current flag. The flag of Kotleba - ĽSNS is strongly identical to that of Andrej Hlinka's Slovak People's Party.

The party is classified by politicians, academics, media outlets, and political scientists as being fascist in nature. This is due to several members of the party being connected to extremist movements such as the Slovak Brotherhood, including leader Marian Kotleba. Party MPs requested a minute of silence for Jozef Tiso to be held in parliament. This request was denied. Tiso was the president of the Slovak State, a clero-fascist republic which existed during the Second World War and served as a satellite state to Nazi Germany. He supported and institute discriminatory laws against Jews, and the Slovak State paid Nazi Germany to deport Slovak Jews during the Holocaust in Slovakia. The party still celebrates 14 March, the anniversary of the founding of the Slovak State.

Kotleba attended a march while dressed in a uniform resembling the ones worn by the Hlinka Guard, described Jews as "devils in human skin", and promoted the conspiracy theory of the Zionist Occupation Government. The party distanced itself from its nostalgia for the Slovak State following failure during the 2006 elections, and instead focused on Anti-Romani comments. Kotleba and his party was also described by both the Slovak President Andrej Kiska and Czech President Miloš Zeman as fascist. The party denies any connection to fascism. Members of the party have been repeatedly charged with Holocaust denial, which is a felony in Slovakia.

During the 2016 Slovak parliamentary election, the party nominated several controversial and extremist candidates to the National Council, such as an ex-singer of neo-Nazi music bands Krátky proces and Juden Mord and a candidate who openly admired Adolf Hitler and promoted Hlinka's historical clero-fascist Slovak People's Party. In May 2017, the General Prosecutor's Office of the Slovak Republic made a proposal to the Supreme Court, requesting the dissolution of the party. The General Prosecutor's Office reasoned this step by pointing to the pro-fascist tendencies of the party, violation of the constitution of the Slovak Republic and violation of Slovak and international laws. The Supreme Court rejected this bid, ruling that the prosecution did not produce sufficient evidence to support the dissolution of the party.

During the party's congress meeting on 29 March 2018, a new logo was proposed which replaced the old logo depicting a straight Slovak double-cross which bore a strong resemblance to the logo used by HSĽS and the Hlinka Guard during the First Slovak Republic with the new logo that depicts the classic Slovak double-cross standing atop the Tatra Mountains. The party claimed that they changed the logo to distance themselves from fascism, Nazism, or any form of right-wing extremism.

In 2019, party MP Milan Mazurek was convicted by the Supreme Court for the racist anti-Roma statements he made on the radio station Rádio Frontinus in 2016. He thus became the first Slovak MP to lose his parliamentary seat as a consequence of being convicted of a deliberate crime, and had to pay a €10,000 fine. Mazurek was re-elected in 2020.

As of 2020, the party spokesperson was Ondrej Ďurica, a former member of the neo-Nazi band Biely Odpor ('White Resistance'). 2020 candidate Andrej Medvecký was convicted of attacking a black man while shouting racist slurs, while another candidate, Anton Grňo, was fined for making a fascist salute (na stráž). Party leader Marian Kotleba was sentenced by a first-degree court to four years and four months in a lowest-security prison for giving cheques in the sum of €1,488, a reference to the Fourteen Words, to three families at a charity event held on 14 March 2017 (the crime of supporting and propagating a movement whose aim is the repression of human rights and freedoms, and doing so publicly). He appealed against the verdict.

== Ideology and agenda ==
In the manifesto of Kotleba – People's Party Our Slovakia, the party states it wants a "functioning state" that is free from corruption, foreign influences and "larceny of public finance". It seeks to give the general public the power to recall any member of the parliament and it wishes to decrease the total number of seats within the National Council from 150 to 100. Additionally, it wants to introduce a flat tax rate of 15% and stop the financing of campaigns for political parties from the state budget, withhold welfare funds for those who refuse to work, and end the financing of NGOs. Moreover, the party advocates for the protection of the environment from pollution and exploitation by implementing conservationist laws and regulations and supporting the research and development of renewable energy.

The party sees the EU and NATO as "undermining the sovereignty of the Slovak nation", and wants to leave these organizations in order to "give Slovakia complete sovereignty and not be part of American war crimes and a toy in the hands of foreign superpowers". The party rejects the proposed Transatlantic Trade and Investment Partnership (TTIP) free trade agreement, advocates a departure from the European Monetary Union, and seeks to re-establish the previous currency, the Slovak koruna, in order to give the state and the central bank authority to decide on the country's monetary policy.

As for internal security, the party wants to establish a home guard with the intention of "protecting the people in areas where legitimate police forces are not adequate at stopping Gypsy extremists who steal, rape and murder decent people", while also advocating the arming of the populace for the "protection of personal life and private property". The party also wants to make politicians responsible for any criminal or corrupt activity they partake in while being a public servant and to be punished accordingly. In addition, ĽSNS also intends to make police forces undergo training in "illegal settlements" inhabited by the resident Romani populace and "demolish any illegal structures, whether they are black settlements or palaces of the rich". The party seeks to re-establish border controls on each segment of the country's borders and give the parliament the ability to use the army to secure and patrol these borders if necessary.

Due to the country's armed forces being small and ill-prepared as a result of conscription being abolished, ĽSNS sees it as necessary to modernize, renew, and increase the size of the Slovak Armed Forces to be able to "effectively protect the nation from any foreign threats when it leaves NATO", to "prevent the hordes of Muslim immigrants from coming to Slovakia", and to "protect Christianity and European culture from Islamization". Furthermore, the party wants to teach children traditionalist and fundamentalist Christian values, to "protect them from violent media", and to ban the operation of gambling machines in the country, while supporting and subsidizing domestic culture and artists to prevent Slovakia from "descending into a degenerate society made up by consumerism, secularism and empty liberalism". ĽSNS has also made proposals in parliament for the banning of abortion conducted in the second and third trimester and contraception in Slovakia, and is staunchly opposed to LGBTQ rights, denouncing the LGBTQ community as "freaks and perverts" and pushing for an active crackdown on LGBTQ activists and media, and the party also supports a constitutional ban on LGBTQ partnerships.

The party plans to give jobs to the long-term unemployed through public works programs. These jobs would consist of the maintenance of roads, schools, national memorials, hospitals and construction of housing as part of their social policy. The retirement age would be lowered to 60 years and the government would increase financial benefits for mothers with children, with rentable housing being provided to "law-abiding and decent families" and benefits to "non-working gypsy thieves" and "asocials" being cancelled.

The party also seeks to nationalize the healthcare system in order to provide universal comprehensive healthcare for the citizens of Slovakia, as written in the Constitution of Slovakia, and to create one national health insurance organization. Additionally, the party wants to return to a centralized emergency service and to make sure that every ambulance has a physician on board to administer appropriate medical care.

The party also seeks to subsidize tertiary education through taxes and eliminate college tuition, effectively introducing free college in Slovakia. In regards to the financial sector, the party intends to nationalize all private banks in the country and create one state-run central bank under the control of the government. The party also wants to nationalize all strategic industries of the country, such as powerplants, steel and automobile manufacturing, mining, agriculture, railways, or public transport. The party wants to assure energy and food self-sufficiency to make the country less dependent on imports by rebuilding the agricultural industry and placing a strong emphasis on locally produced goods. In addition, the party seeks to get rid of bureaucracy and red tape in business to increase growth of domestic companies.

The party is vocally opposed to liberalism and Atlanticism, and harbours strong anti-establishment sentiment, rejecting the standard left-right classification and positioning itself as a syncretic movement. Other policies include opposition to gun control and protesting NATO convoys passing through Slovakia. In 2019, the party resumed its notorious campaign to collect enough petition signatures to leave NATO.

=== Views on Roma and migrants ===
The party sees and describes the unintegrated groups of Romani people as being a drain on the social security system due to large Roma families allegedly receiving a significantly higher amount of benefits for children compared to ethnic Slovaks. This especially applies to illegal and segregated Roma settlements, where these "gypsy extremists", as the party calls them, often reside in. Occasionally, the party has said that it wants to crack down on "Gypsy terror", and uses the Krásna Hôrka Castle fire of 2012 as an example of "gypsy criminality", whilst using rhetoric that describes the "gypsy extremists" as "social parasites and extremists that steal, rape and murder decent people".

According to the party, immigrants from third world countries are "invaders who are supported by globalists to destroy the old continent of Europe". The party is against the acceptance of even a single refugee, stating that "even one is too much", while blaming the EU and the Schengen Agreement for alleged "immigrant invasion".

== Pro-Russian activities ==
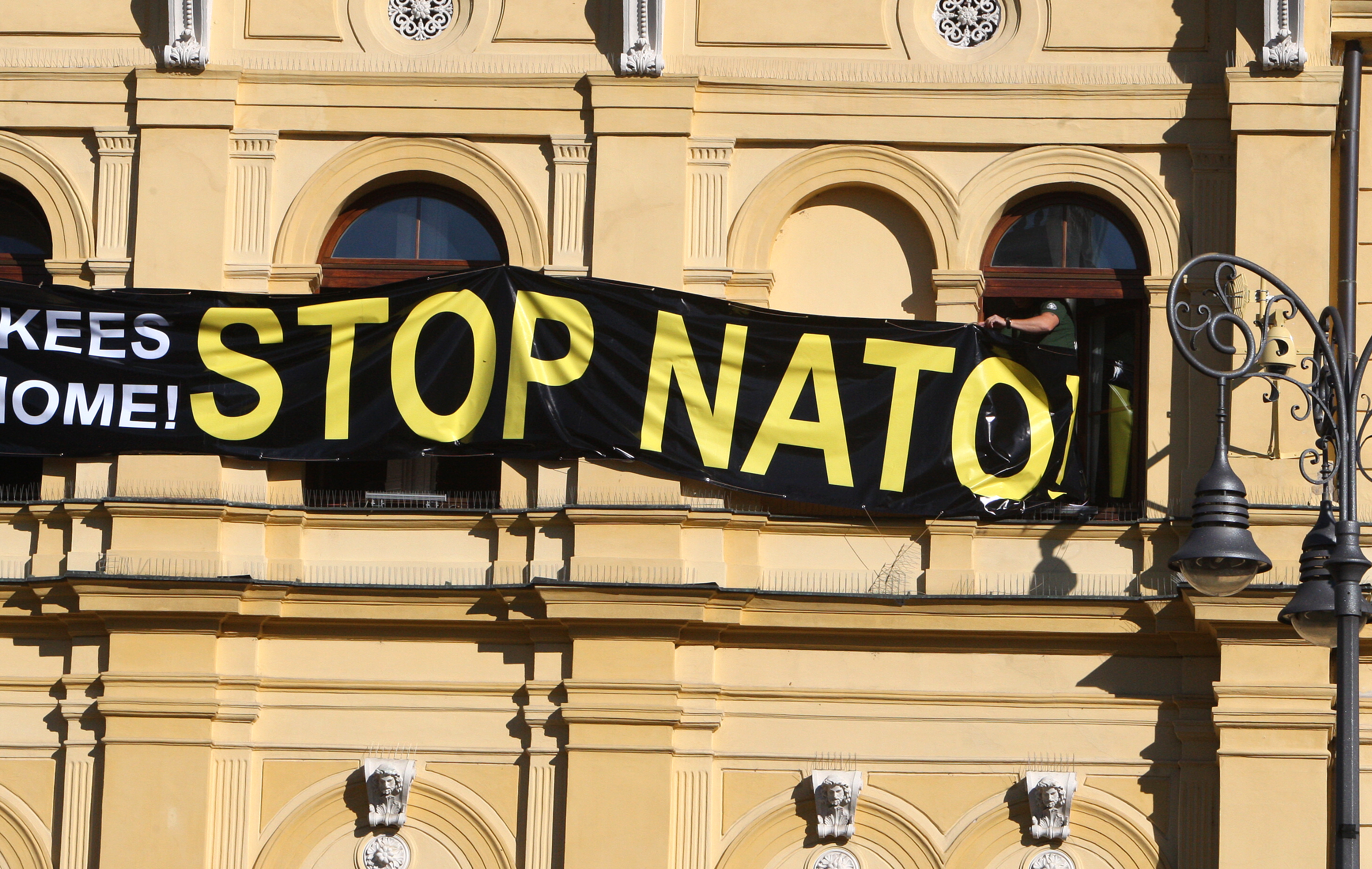
An anti-NATO and anti-American sign that was hung on the governor's building during Kotleba's rule in 2014. Kotleba - ĽSNS is well known for its virulent anti-Americanism and opposition to NATO and the European Union.

On 31 January 2014, during Kotleba's governorship of the Banská Bystrica region, Marian Kotleba sent a personal letter to Viktor Yanukovych during the Euromaidan revolution in Ukraine, urging him as a "fellow Slav" not to "surrender his country to EU interests, markets and NATO aggression, to stay vigilant against foreign coup d'etats, and to remember what happened to Serbian national heroes such as Slobodan Milošević".

On 29 August 2014, Marian Kotleba hung up a sign saying "Yankees go home! STOP NATO!" on the governor's building in Banská Bystrica, demonstrating the party's anti-Americanism.

On 5 May 2016, the ĽSNS branch located in the Banská Bystrica region hung up a Russian flag in the city of Banská Bystrica, to show solidarity with the Russian community in the city and the Night Wolves biker club. which came to commemorate the Russian victory over fascism. The party also sent three people, including one MP, to commemorate the Slovak National Uprising at the SNP monument and museum. However, party leader Marian Kotleba denounced the Allied campaign during the Uprising and indirectly endorsed the pro-Axis Slovak State.

Several media outlets such as Pluska and Denník N accused the party of being financed by Russian intelligence services. The Polish Internal Security Agency was the first to come with this evidence after the arrest of Mateusz Piskorski. The party denied all of these claims, describing the party's position of neutrality in regards to the United States and Russia, but firmly opposing any aggression against Russia or its government, accusing the US of being the main sponsor of terrorism across the world and NATO of being an actual aggressor against Russia. The foreign policy of the United States is cited by the party as one of the reasons for why the party wants Slovakia to leave NATO. Another reason is the NATO bombing of Yugoslavia in 1999.

On 2 February 2017, Kotleba and his party spoke against sending a contingent of 152 Slovak soldiers on a NATO training mission in Latvia near the Russian border, stating that it was a clear provocation of the Russian Federation by NATO. During a voting session on this issue in the Slovak parliament, only his party and We Are Family voted against sending troops on the NATO mission, while every other party supported it. He also accused the government and opposition of acting like the Nazis and Adolf Hitler in 1941 when he was preparing to attack the Soviet Union before Operation Barbarossa.

On 2 June 2017, the party was accused of being financed by Alexander Usovskij from Belarus, after his emails were leaked to the public and were reported on by German broadcaster ZDF. It is said that he was supplying money from the Russian Federation to Eastern European countries, including Slovakia, to support pro-Russian activities and political parties, even mentioning that Usovskij is supporting ĽSNS work. Usovskij denied that he was in any contact with ĽSNS, but said that he sympathises with the party's activities, agreeing with their bid for a referendum to leave NATO. ZDF also added that he may have been looking for investors that could help the party's campaign in said referendum. An investigation by the National Criminal Agency found no evidence that ĽSNS was being funded by the Russian government.

During his presidential campaign, Kotleba frequently deployed slogans such as "For Slavic brotherhood, against a war with Russia!" on his campaign billboards. Moreover, the party's candidates for the European Parliament, such as Milan Mazurek, uttered the phrase "For cooperation with Russia, against the sanctions!" during their respective campaigns. The Party firmly supports the complete cancellation of all sanctions against the Russian Federation.

A rally of ĽSNS members conducted in 2019.

On 16 May 2019, the Russian Foreign Ministry criticized the extremist policies and tactics of Kotleba-ĽSNS.

Many members of the party are known for their sympathy towards the Russian Federation and its allies. Party leader Marian Kotleba is known for his sympathy towards the Russian Federation and the Syrian Arab Republic, as evidenced by his repeated use of pro-Russian slogans during his presidential campaign and his declaration on national television that Bashar al-Assad is "a hero of the Middle-East". Kotleba also made trips to Syria, having met with the Syrian Speaker of the House and the Foreign Minister of Syria.

It was revealed from the documents found within the governor's office upon Kotleba's departure from Banská Bystrica's governorship that he wanted to send a letter to the Russian ambassador, in which he asked for assistance and personally wrote about his intention to buy a Russian car. MEP Milan Uhrík visited the People's Republic of China on one occasion and spoke in support of their authoritarian government. Milan Mazurek and Miroslav Radačovský are also known for their Russophilic views.

On 13 October 2019, Milan Uhrík made a speech in the European Parliament about the situation in Ukraine and the war in Donbas, blaming the United States for orchestrating an alleged coup d'état in Kyiv during the Euromaidan protests and the 2014 Ukrainian Revolution which ousted Viktor Yanukovych, and then proceeded to condemn the United States and other western nations for allegedly supporting a war between Slavic countries such as Ukraine and Russia, stating: "We Slavs are not stupid and we don't need American agents, their advice or their wars".

== Supporter demographics ==
People's Party Our Slovakia support in 2020 election

The party has little to no support in Bratislava, Košice, Nitra, Komárno, Poprad, and other major cities. However, the party's message resonates more in smaller towns and rural areas where people feel left behind and disliked by political elites.

== Election results ==
=== National Council ===
Election	Leader	Votes	%	Seats	+/–	Government
2010	Marian Kotleba	33,724	1.33 (#10)	0 / 150		Extra-parliamentary
2012	Marian Kotleba	40,460	1.58 (#10)	0 / 150	Steady	Extra-parliamentary
2016	Marian Kotleba	209,779	8.04 (#5)	14 / 150	▲14	Opposition
2020	Marian Kotleba	229,581	7.97 (#4)	17 / 150	▲3	Opposition
2023	Marian Kotleba	25,003	0.84 (#12)	0 / 150	▼17	Extra-parliamentary

=== European Parliament ===
Election	List leader	Votes	%	Rank	Seats	+/–	EP Group
2014	Martin Beluský	9,749	1.73%	11th	0 / 13	New	–
2019	Martin Beluský	118,995	12.07%	3rd	2 / 14	▲2	NI
2024	Marian Kotleba	7,103	0.48%	13th	0 / 15	▼2	–

=== Presidential ===
Election	Candidate	First round		Second round		Result
Election	Candidate	Votes	%	Votes	%	Result
2019	Marian Kotleba	222,935	10.39			Lost
2024	Marian Kotleba	12,771	0.57			Lost

=== Regional ===
Election	Bratislava	Trnava	Trenčín	Nitra	Žilina	Banská Bystrica	Prešov	Košice	Total
2013	0 / 44	0 / 40	0 / 45	0 / 54	0 / 57	1 / 49	0 / 62	0 / 57	1 / 408
2017	0 / 44	0 / 40	0 / 45	1 / 54	0 / 57	1 / 49	0 / 62	0 / 57	2 / 408
2022	0 / 44	0 / 40	0 / 45	0 / 54	0 / 57	0 / 49	0 / 62	0 / 57	0 / 408

== See also ==
- Marian Kotleba
- List of political parties in Slovakia
- National Council (Slovakia)
- Slovak Brotherhood
- Republic (Slovakia)
