= Juraj Droba =

Slovak politician and businessman

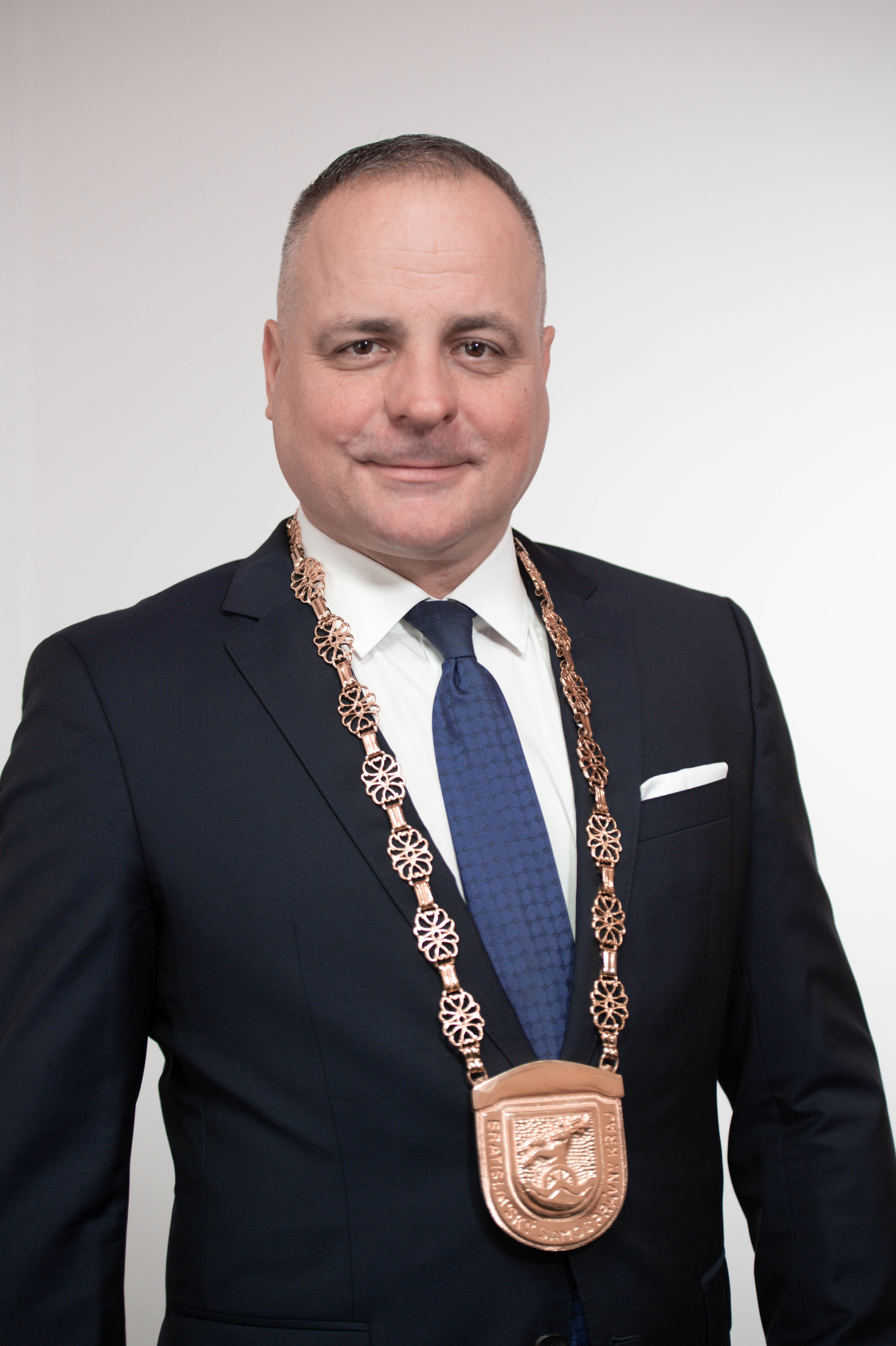

Governor of Bratislava Region
- Incumbent
- Assumed office 4 December 2017
- Preceded by: Pavol Frešo

Member of the National Council
- In office 8 July 2010 – 4 December 2017

Personal details
- Born: 25 May 1971 (age 54) Bratislava, Czechoslovakia (now Slovakia)
- Party: Freedom and Solidarity
- Spouse(s): Gabriela Drobová (m. 2001; div. 2007) Lucia Piteková (m. 2022)
- Children: 2
- Education: Comenius University in Bratislava; George Washington University; University of Pittsburgh

Juraj Droba (born 25 May 1971) is a Slovak politician and businessman serving as Governor of Bratislava region since 4 December 2017. Between 2010 and 2018, he was an MP in the National Council of Slovakia. He is a founding member of the Freedom and Solidarity party.

== Early life ==
Droba graduated in English and Physical Education teaching at the Comenius University in Bratislava in 1996, after which he enrolled in the Executive MBA programme at the Comenius University in Bratislava, organised in cooperation with the University of Pittsburgh. Whilst pursuing his MBA, Droba became a partner at a local communication firm called Omnipublic. In 2001, he went to the United States to enroll at the Graduate School of Political Management of the George Washington University in Washington D.C. During his stay in the United States, Droba befriended Eduard Heger, later Prime Minister of Slovakia. After graduating from GWU, Droba returned to Slovakia and served as a Board Member and Director of External Communication division at Slovak Telekom. In 2007, he and Heger teamed up with a group of American investors to start Old Nassau, the producer of premium Slovak export vodka brand Double Cross Vodka.

== Political career ==
=== Member of Parliament ===
Droba was elected to parliament in 2010 and again in 2012 on the liberal Freedom and Solidarity (SaS) party list. He left the party with four other MPs in 2013 due to disagreement with the leadership of the party's chairman Richard Sulík. The defectors subsequently founded the liberal wing of the Nova party led by former Minister of Interior Affairs Daniel Lipšic. Droba ran for the MEP seat on the New Majority list in 2014, but was not elected. He later found himself at odds with conservative members on the New Majority and expressed the desire to rejoin SaS, but was not allowed back by the party members despite Sulík's support. Despite the rejection, Droba and another MP Eugen Jurzyca, who had previously defected from the Slovak Democratic and Christian Union – Democratic Party, joined with the loyalist SaS MPs to reestablish the SaS parliamentary faction, which had been previously dissolved as the remaining number of MPs after the defection was too low to warrant a faction.

=== Governor of Bratislava region ===
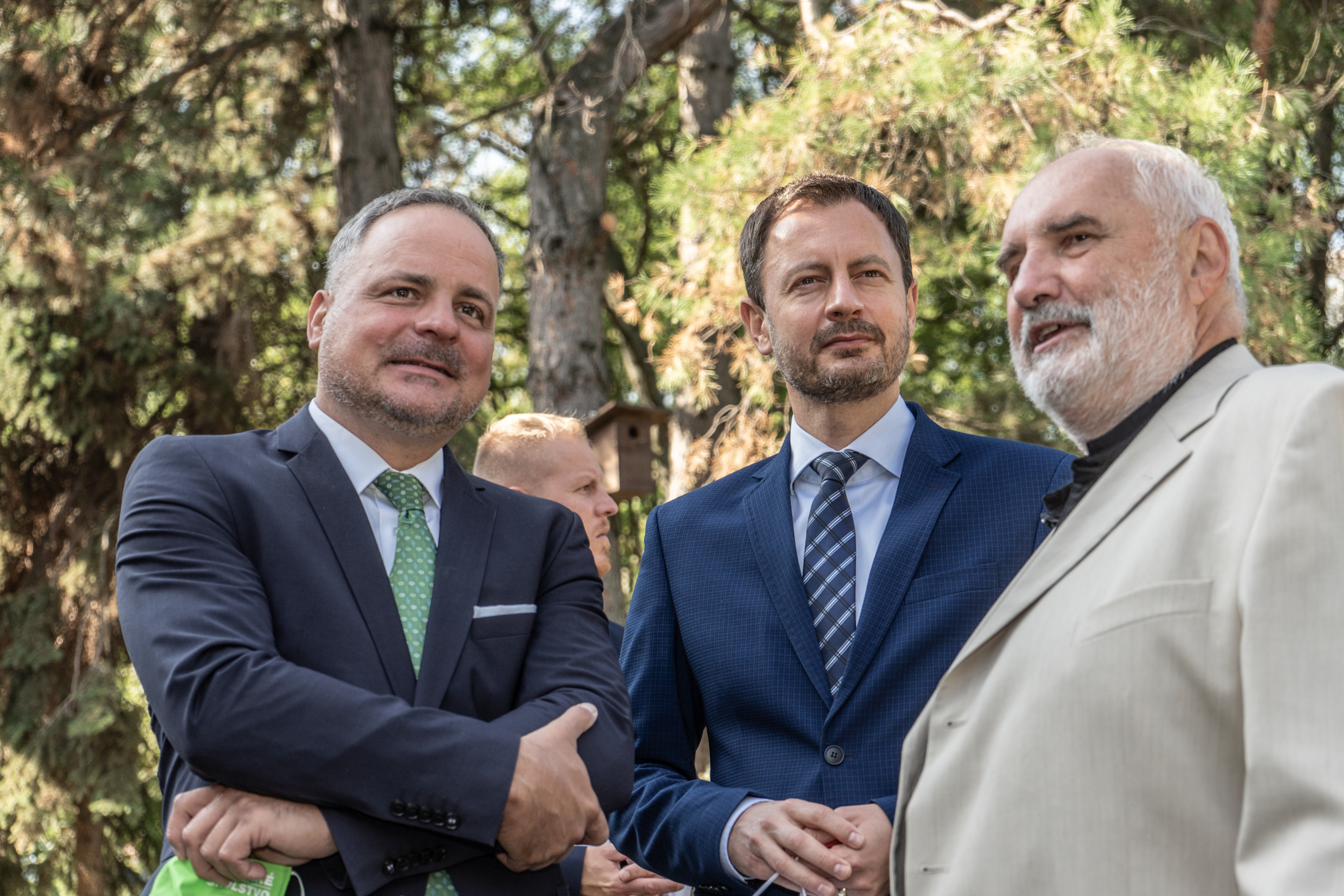
Juraj Droba and Prime Minister Eduard Heger opening a school in the Bratislava region

Droba was elected Governor of the Bratislava region in 2017 but he gave up his MP seat. He rejoined the Freedom and Solidarity in 2019. and ran on the party list in the 2020 Slovak parliamentary election. Despite being elected, Droba did not take his seat, claiming he only ran to support the party.

Droba won praise for prudently moving fast to close the schools in the Bratislava region following the outbreak of the COVID-19 pandemic in March 2020. He was criticised for disruption in the regional bus service following the change in the company operating the bus lines in 2021. Droba blamed the Arriva company who took over the lines for disruption and claimed he spared no effort to rectify the situation as soon as possible.

== Personal life ==
Droba married TV executive Gabriela Drobová between 2001 and 2007, with whom he did not have any children. In 2012, he had a son from a relationship Katarína Lešková, also named Juraj. In 2022, Droba married Lucia Piteková, the director of Slovak representation at the Dubai Expo. Their son was born in September 2023.
