= NOVA (Slovakia) =

Slovak political party

New Majority Nová Väčšina
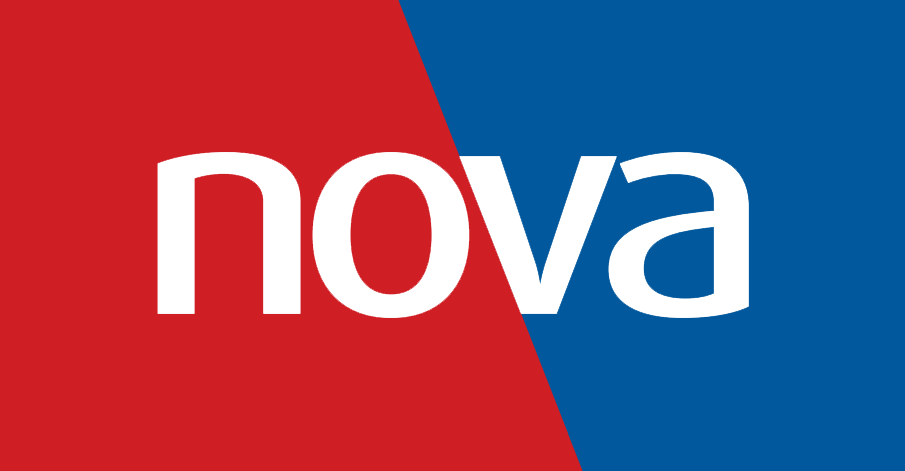
- Leader: Gábor Grendel
- Presidium: Anna Andrejuvová; Marcel Klimek; Ján Lazar
- Founders: Daniel Lipšic; Jana Žitňanská
- Founded: 2 September 2012; 13 years ago
- Split from: KDH
- Headquarters: Palárikova 31, 811 04 Bratislava
- Membership (2022): ▼573
- Ideology: Conservatism; Christian democracy
- Political position: Centre-right
- National affiliation: OĽaNO and Friends
- European affiliation: European Conservatives and Reformists Party (2014–2021)
- European Parliament group: European Conservatives and Reformists (2014–2019)
- Colours: Blue Red
- National Council: 1 / 150
- European Parliament: 0 / 15
- Regional governors: 0 / 8
- Regional deputies: 7 / 416
- Mayors: 30 / 2,904

Website
- nova.sk

New Majority (Slovak: Nová väčšina, NOVA) is a conservative political party in Slovakia.

The ideology of this political party is liberalism and Christian democracy.

== Naming history ==
- 2 September – December 2012: New Majority (Slovak: Nová väčšina; NOVA)
- December 2012 – July 2013: New Majority (Daniel Lipšic) (Slovak: Nová väčšina (Daniel Lipšic); NOVA)
- July 2013 – 28 June 2014: New Majority – Agreement (D. Lipšic) (Slovak: Nová väčšina – Dohoda (D. Lipšic); NOVA)
- From 28 June 2014: NEW (Slovak: NOVA)

== History ==
The party was established on 2 September 2012 by Daniel Lipšic and Jana Žitňanská, representatives of Slovak national council, who had previously left the Christian Democratic Movement (KDH). Daniel Lipšic, who had also been the vice-president of his former party, was elected its president. They represent a conservative faction of party. In May 2013, five representatives of Freedom and Solidarity (SaS) Jozef Kollár, Juraj Droba, Daniel Krajcer, Juraj Miškov, and Martin Chren left the party, joining New Majority. They represent a liberal faction of the party.

In the 2014 European elections, New Majority came in fifth place nationally, receiving 6.83% of the vote and electing 1 MEP.

In the 2016 parliamentary elections NOVA ran its candidates on a common list with Ordinary People, getting two of them elected.

== Election results ==
=== National Council ===
Election	Leader	Votes	%	Rank	Seats	+/–	Status
2016	Daniel Lipšic	OĽaNO–NOVA			2 / 150		Opposition
2020	Gábor Grendel	OĽaNO–NOVA–KÚ–ZZ			2 / 150	0	OĽaNO–We Are Family–SaS–For the People (2020–2022)
2020	Gábor Grendel	OĽaNO–NOVA–KÚ–ZZ			2 / 150	0	OĽaNO–We Are Family–For the People (2022–2023)
2020	Gábor Grendel	OĽaNO–NOVA–KÚ–ZZ			2 / 150	0	Opposition (2023)
2023	Gábor Grendel	OĽaNO–KÚ–For the People			1 / 150	▼1	Opposition

=== European Parliament ===
Election	List leader	Votes	%	Rank	Seats	+/–	EP Group
2014 (Note: Run in a joint list with KDS and OKS)	Jozef Kollár	38,316	6.83%	5th	1 / 13	New	ECR
2019	Did not contest				0 / 14	▼1	–
2024 (Note: Run in a joint list with Slovakia and ZĽ.)	Peter Pollák	29,385	1.99%	9th	0 / 15	0	–
