= Gábor Grendel =

Slovak politician

Deputy Speaker of the National Council
- In office 20 March 2020 – 25 October 2023 Serving with Peter Pellegrini, Milan Laurenčík and Juraj Šeliga
- Speaker: Boris Kollár

Member of the National Council
- Incumbent
- Assumed office 23 March 2016

Chairman of New Majority
- Incumbent
- Assumed office 3 June 2017
- Preceded by: Daniel Lipšic

Personal details
- Born: 15 June 1980 (age 45) Bratislava, Czechoslovakia
- Party: New Majority
- Education: Comenius University

Gábor Grendel (born 15 July 1980) is a Slovak journalist and politician. Since 2016 he has served as a Member of the National Council. In addition, he has been a Deputy Speaker of the Council since 2020. Between 2017 and 2019, he was the Chairman of the NOVA party.

== Early life ==
Grendel was born on 15 July 1980 in Bratislava, Czechoslovakia (now Slovakia) to an intellectual family of Hungarian ethnicity. His father, Lajos Grendel, was a prominent writer and his mother, Ágota Grendel, a journalist.

In 2003, he graduated in Journalism and Hungarian language at the Comenius University.

== Journalism career ==
Following his graduation, Grendel worked as a journalist for the Új Szó daily, Twist radio as well as TA3 and Markíza TV Channels. In 2010, he became the spokesman for the Interior Affairs minister Daniel Lipšic.

== Political career ==
Grender was among the founders of the New Majority (NOVA) party headed by Lipšic. In the 2016 Slovak parliamentary election, NOVA ran in coalition with the Ordinary People and Independent Personalities (OĽaNO) movement. Grender was elected an MP. He retained his seat in the 2020 Slovak parliamentary election, once again on the joint list with OĽaNO.

In 2017, he succeeded Lipšic as the Chairman of NOVA. He resigned in 2019 due to disagreements with other party leaders about strategic direction of the party.
