= Marian Kotleba =

Slovak politician and economist

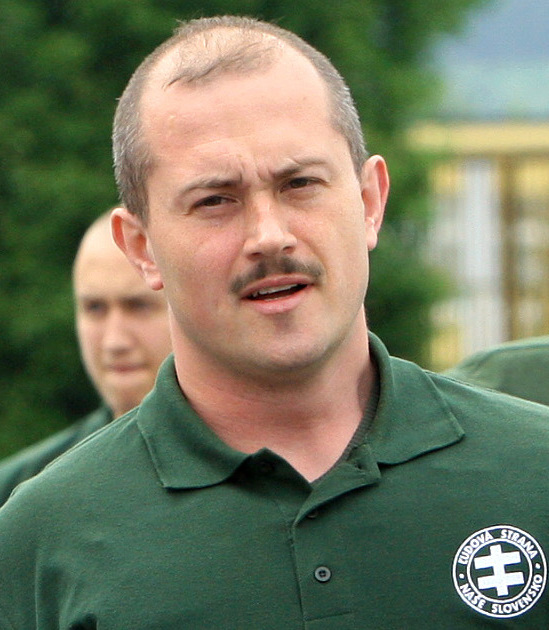

Governor of Banská Bystrica Region
- In office 24 November 2013 – 4 December 2017
- Preceded by: Vladimír Maňka
- Succeeded by: Ján Lunter

Member of the National Council
- In office 2016–2022

Personal details
- Born: 7 April 1977 (age 49) Banská Bystrica, Czechoslovakia (now Slovakia)
- Party: People's Party Our Slovakia
- Spouse: Frederika Pospíšilová (div. 2019)
- Education: Matej Bel University

Marian Kotleba (Slovak: [ˈmari.aŋ ˈkɔtleba]; born 7 April 1977) is a Slovak politician and leader of the far-right, neo-Nazi political party Kotlebists – People's Party Our Slovakia (Slovak: Kotlebovci – Ľudová strana Naše Slovensko).

He served as the governor of Banská Bystrica Region from 2013 to 2017. He was a presidential candidate in the 2019 election, in which he finished fourth.

== Early life and education ==
Born in Banská Bystrica in what was then Czechoslovakia, Kotleba attended the local Jozef Murgas High School. After finishing his education at a Grammar School he enrolled at the Matej Bel University receiving a Master's Degree in Pedagogics, later he once again enrolled at the Economics faculty at the same university and graduated with a master's degree in Economics. After studies he taught at the Sports Grammar School (Slovak: Športové gymnázium Banská Bystrica) specialising in sports.

== Political views ==
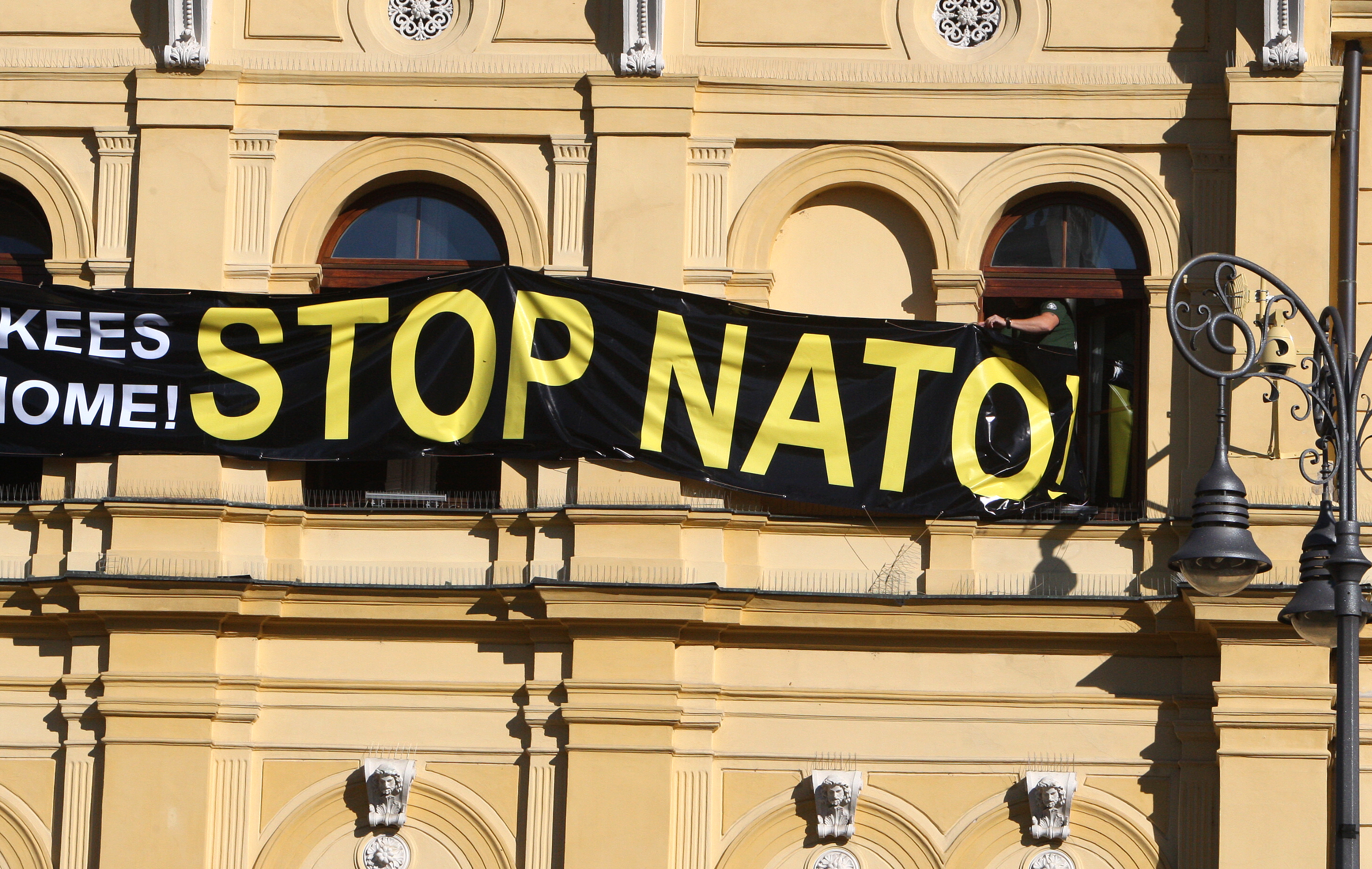
Banner at the Banská Bystrica administration building put up by Kotleba, 'Yankees go home! Stop NATO!'

Kotleba supports Jozef Tiso and the First Slovak Republic, and he is openly against Roma people, the Slovak National Uprising, NATO, the United States, and the European Union. According to Hospodárske noviny, his position on the Holocaust is unclear. The BBC and The Economist have described him as a neo-Nazi. Kotleba has promoted the Zionist Occupation Government conspiracy theory and described Jews as "devils in human skin".

Kotleba has had a negative reception from the Slovak and foreign media due to his political views. Outlets such as Pravda, Denník SME, and Aktuality have characterized him as "extremist", "fascist", and "neo-Nazi".

=== Russia and Syria ===
Kotleba is known for his sympathy towards Russia and the ousted Assad regime of Syria, having slogans during his presidential campaign in 2019 such as "For Slavic unity, against war with Russia" and declaring on national television that "Bashar al-Assad is a hero of the Middle-East". Kotleba also made trips to Syria, having met with its speaker of parliament and foreign minister. It was revealed upon his departure from the Banská Bystrica governorship from the documents found there, that he wanted to send a letter to the Russian ambassador, in which he asked for assistance and profoundly wrote about his intention to buy a Russian car. He also spoke critically of American intervention in Iraq, Afghanistan, Yugoslavia, Libya, and Syria, once reading all of United States involvement in regime change in the Slovak Parliament.

== Political career ==
In 2003, Kotleba founded the far-right political party Slovak Togetherness (Slovak: Slovenská Pospolitosť). In 2007 the Slovak interior ministry banned the party from running and campaigning in elections, however it still functioned as a civic organisation. In 2009 he ran for the post of Governor of the Banská Bystrica region and received 10% of the votes. In the 2013 local elections he ran again and this time received approximately 20% of the votes, thereby securing a run-off against favourite Vladimír Maňka. Kotleba won the run-off by receiving 55% of the votes.

Kotleba's win was described as a "shock" by political analysts, who attributed it to deep anti-Romani sentiments in the region. Observers originally had said that they saw almost no chance for Kotleba to succeed in the second round against Maňka, but nonetheless found his strong showing "disturbing".

Prior to the 2016 election to the National Council, he renamed his party Ľudová strana Naše Slovensko (English: People's Party Our Slovakia) to Kotleba – Ľudová strana Naše Slovensko. Despite the polls suggesting the 1.5–3.5% gain of votes, the party entered parliament with a gain of over 8% of the vote. Despite elements of Neo-Nazism, the post-electoral polls suggest that his success was a result of dissatisfaction with the running of Slovakia and was seen as a protest vote against the ruling Smer – Sociálna demokracia and the fractured right. It was also linked to the fall of the Christian Democratic Movement, the Christian conservative party, and the European migrant crisis.

He was defeated in the Slovak regional elections of 2017 by an independent candidate, Ján Lunter.

In the 2020 parliamentary election his party gained 7.97%, which gave them 17 seats.

On 5 April 2022, Kotleba automatically lost his mandate of MP in the National Council as a consequence of being found guilty of demonstrating sympathy for a movement directed at suppression of fundamental rights and freedoms by the Supreme Court.

In the 2023 parliamentary election, his party lost all their seats.

== €1,488 cheques court case ==
Kotleba was charged with demonstrating sympathy for a movement directed at suppression of fundamental rights and freedoms by publicly donating €1,488 cheques to various families. The number "1488" is commonly used as a dog whistle among numerous neo-Nazi communities.

On 12 October 2020, a first-degree court found him guilty of a more serious crime than he was charged with (supporting and propagating a movement whose aim is the repression of human rights and freedoms, and doing so publicly). He was sentenced to four years and four months in a lowest-security prison. Kotleba appealed against the verdict.

On 5 April 2022, the Supreme Court of the Slovak Republic changed the ruling of the first-degree court and found Kotleba guilty of the crime he was originally charged with. He received a suspended sentence of 6 months in prison.

== Electoral history ==
=== Presidential ===
Election	First round			
Election	Votes	%	Place	Result
2019	222,935	10.39	4th	Lost
2024	12,771	0.57	8th	Lost
