= Marcela Gbúrová =

Slovak politician and political scientist

Member of the National Council
- In office 23 June 1992 – 29 October 1998

Personal details
- Born: 24 May 1954 (age 71) Čierna Lehota, Czechoslovakia (now Slovakia)
- Party: Communist Party of Czechoslovakia; Public Against Violence; Movement for a Democratic Slovakia; Social Democratic Party of Slovakia; Party of the Democratic Left; Party of Civic Understanding
- Spouse: Ján Gbúr
- Children: 1
- Education: University of Prešov

Marcela Gbúrová (née Marcela Komáromiová, born 24 May 1954 in Čierna Lehota) is a Slovak political scientist and politician who served as a member of the National Council in 1992–1998.

== Academic career ==
Gbúrová studied history and philosophy at the University of Prešov, graduating in 1977. In 1987 she completed post-gradual education at the Higher School of Marxism-Leninism in Bratislava. In her dissertation, she discussed nationalism in the Czechoslovak Socialist Republic of the 1960s. In 1996, she finished her habilitation and in 2006 she became a Professor of Political Science at the University of Prešov. In 2010, she established the Department of Political Science at the Pavol Jozef Šafárik University in Košice which received accreditation, despite serious concerns about the quality of the program, expressed by rectors of Slovak universities, the higher education accreditation authority and politician Miroslav Beblavý, who argued Gbúrová never published in any international scientific journals.

As of 2022, she is still a professor in the political science department.

== Political career ==
Before the Velvet Revolution, Gbúrová was a member of the Communist Party of Czechoslovakia. After the revolution she joined the Public Against Violence movement and later the Movement for a Democratic Slovakia, on which list she was elected in the 1992 Slovak parliamentary election. In 1994 she joined the Social Democratic Party of Slovakia, becoming the party's sole MP.

In 1994 Slovak parliamentary election she ran on the Common Choice coalition list and again gained a mandate. After failing her bid to become the Chairwoman of the Social Democratic Party of Slovakia, she again left the party and joined the Party of the Democratic Left caucus. Nonetheless, when the party refused to put her on the list for the 1998 Slovak parliamentary election, she joined the newly formed Party of Civic Understanding, once again becoming the sole MP of her party. Just before election, the party decided to pull Gbúrová from its election list, due to her publicly expressed sympathies for autocratic rule of Vladimír Mečiar.
