= 1998 Slovak presidential election =

1998 Slovak Presidential election
- 20 January to 17 December 1998
President before election
Michal Kováč
Elected President
none

The 1998 Slovak Presidential elections were held from 20 January to 17 December 1998. The Slovak parliament failed to elect the new president of Slovakia which led to the introduction of a direct election in 1999. A candidate would have needed to receive 90 votes to be elected.

== Voting ==
=== First Ballot ===
20 January and 6 February	Štefan Markuš (SDK)	Juraj Hraško (SDĽ)	Augustín Kurek
First Round	33	22	14
Second Round	37	27	eliminated

=== Second Ballot ===
5 and 19 March	Ladislav Ballek (SDĽ)	Milan Fogaš
First Round	49	5
Second Round	50	suspended

=== Third Ballot ===
16 and 30 April	Milan Sečánsky (ĽS–HZDS)	Brigita Schmögnerová (SDĽ)	Zdeno Šuška
First Round	59	43	5
Second Round	72	47	eliminated

=== Fourth Ballot ===
9 May	Vladimír Abrahám
First Round	13
Second Round	suspended

=== Fifth Ballot ===
9 July	Otto Tomeček (ĽS–HZDS, SNS, ZRS)
First Round	86
Second Round	86

=== Remaining Ballots ===
There were another 4 ballots in which no candidate was registered. The last ballot was on 17 December.
