= Ján Ľupták =

Slovak politician (1946–2025)

Deputy Speaker of the National Council
- In office 3 November 1994 – 24 September 1998 Serving with Augustín Marián Húska, Marián Andel and Rudolf Filkus
- Speaker: Ivan Gašparovič

Member of the National Council
- In office 23 June 1992 – 24 September 1998

Personal details
- Born: 24 February 1946 Radzovce, Czechoslovakia
- Died: 19 June 2025 (aged 79)
- Party: Union of the Workers of Slovakia
- Other political affiliations: Party of the Democratic Left (1990–1994)

Ján Ľupták (24 February 1946 – 19 June 2025) was a Slovak politician. From 1992 to 1998 he served as a Member of the National Council of Slovakia.

== Early life ==
Ján Ľupták was born on 24 February 1946 in the village of Radzovce in Lučenec District. He apprenticed as a mason and from 1969 until his entry to politics in 1990 he worked as a construction worker.

== Political career ==
Ľupták represented the Party of the Democratic Left in the National Council from 1990. He was reelected in 1992. Unlike many politicians in the newly independent Slovakia, who stressed their educational accomplishments and prominent background, Ľupták presented himself as a voice of ordinary blue-collar workers. Shortly before the 1994 Slovak parliamentary election, he established himself as the most popular politician in Slovakia. Ľupták capitalized on his popularity by leaving the Party of the Democratic Left and establishing his own party, the Union of the Workers of Slovakia, which received over 7% of the vote, in spite of lack of recognizable candidates, other than Ľupták himself.

Although Ľupták campaigned on populist rhetoric and sharply criticized rival parties before the election, advocating radical pro-worker legislation, his stance shifted after the vote. His party became a key supporter of the increasingly authoritarian government led by Vladimír Mečiar. Ľupták was appointed deputy speaker of the Slovak parliament—a prestigious role that held little executive authority. His coarse demeanor and limited grasp of parliamentary procedure quickly undermined his credibility, earning him a reputation as a political caricature rather than a serious statesman.

The alliance with Mečiar was marked by ideological contradictions. While Ľupták claimed to represent the working class, Mečiar's power base increasingly relied on emerging Slovak oligarchs whose interests clashed with labor-friendly policies. Despite this tension, Ľupták neither wielded the political strength nor demonstrated the resolve needed to influence the government's direction.

Ľupták's key election promise was to stop privatization of state enterprises. After the election Ľupták's close ally, Štefan Gavorník, was named the chair of the National Wealth Fund, which was given exclusive authority over privatization. However, rather than stopping privatization, the Fund engaged in widespread privatization to insiders and gross mismanagement of state-owned property. The installation of Ľupták's mother-in-law, previously an accountant, on the board of a major bank became synonymous with nepotistic practices of the government.

Ľupták's popularity quickly vanished and the Union of the Workers of Slovakia received only 1.3% of the vote in the 1998 Slovak parliamentary election and even less afterward. Likewise, Ľupták's attempt to return to the parliament on the list of the Communist Party of Slovakia was unsuccessful.

== Personal life and death ==
Ľupták was married and had two children. After the end of his political career, he worked as a sales representative for a brickmaker. He died on 19 June 2025, at the age of 79.
