= List of political parties in Slovakia =

This article lists political parties in Slovakia. Slovakia has a democratic multi-party system with numerous political parties, established after the fall of communism in 1989 and shaped into the present form with Slovakia's independence in 1993. Since 1989 there has been altogether 236 registered political parties in the country, 61 are active as of March 2012. Today they have 58 active parties

In the Slovak political system usually no one party has a chance of gaining power alone, and parties must work with each other to form coalition governments, an exception being the parliamentary elections in 2012.

Political party system map of Slovakia, 1990–2026

== Political party system change over time ==
Since the reintroduction of elections in 1990, Slovakia's political party system has experienced significant changes including many splits and mergers and the ongoing emergence of genuinely new political parties. Relatively few of the parties in Slovakia's trace their origins back to the 1990s (the Christian Democratic Movement and the Slovak National Party). Others emerged fully in the 2000s (Smer-Social Democracy and Freedom and Solidarity), in the 2010s (Ordinary People and Independent Personalities, now Slovensko) and Progressive Slovakia) and in the 2020s (Hlas-SD and Republika).

== Active political parties ==
=== Parties with representation in the National Council and European Parliament ===
Party		Leader	Ideology	Previous election		Current seats	MEPs
Party		Leader	Ideology	Votes (%)	Seats	Current seats	MEPs
Direction – Social Democracy; Smer – sociálna demokracia	Smer	Robert Fico	Social democracy Left-conservatism	22.95%	42 / 150	42 / 150	5 / 15
Progressive Slovakia; Progresívne Slovensko	PS	Michal Šimečka	Liberalism; Pro-Europeanism	17.96%	32 / 150	33 / 150	6 / 15
Voice – Social Democracy; Hlas – sociálna demokracia	Hlas	Matúš Šutaj Eštok	Social democracy Left-wing nationalism	14.70%	27 / 150	26 / 150	1 / 15
Slovakia Movement; Hnutie Slovensko	Slovakia	Igor Matovič	Populism; National conservatism	8.90%	16 / 150	10 / 150	0 / 15
Christian Democratic Movement; Kresťanskodemokratické hnutie	KDH	Milan Majerský	Christian democracy Social conservatism	6.82%	12 / 150	11 / 150	1 / 15
Freedom and Solidarity; Sloboda a Solidarita	SaS	Branislav Gröhling	Right-libertarianism; Classical liberalism	6.32%	11 / 150	11 / 150	0 / 15
Slovak National Party; Slovenská národná strana	SNS	Andrej Danko	Ultranationalism; Right-wing populism	5.63%	10 / 150	6 / 150	0 / 15
Republic Movement; Hnutie Republika	Republika	Milan Uhrík	Neo-fascism; Ultranationalism	4.75%	0 / 150	0 / 150	2 / 15

=== Extra-parliamentary parties ===
Name	Founded	Leader	Misc.
Change from Below	2000	Ján Budaj	
Together Citizens of Slovakia (sk)	2023	Tibor Hanuliak	
Communist Party of Slovakia	1991	Jozef Hrdlička	The party has not been represented in parliament since 2006
Dawn	2005	Luciana Hoptová	The party split from the Communist Party of Slovakia
Democrats	2018	Eduard Heger	Until 2023 it was named TOGETHER – Civic Democracy.
Democrats of Slovakia	2005	Ľudovít Kaník	Until 2015 was named Prosperity of Slovakia.
Forum	2019	Zsolt Simon	From 2019 to 2024 it was named Hungarian Forum.
Home National Party	2005	Pavol Slota	
Hungarian Alliance	2019	Krisztián Forró	From 2019 to 2021 it was named Hungarian Community Togetherness. From 2021 to 2023 it was named Alliance.
Let's try another way	2019	Veronika Gajdošová Ladňáková	In 2019 the party was named To the right. Until 2022 the party was named The voice of the right.
Life - National Party	2019	Tomáš Taraba	
Mayors and Independent Candidates	2009	František Gőgh	From 2011 to 2014 it was named Party +1 Vote
Movement Citizen Nation Justice	2014	Ivan Stanovič	The party was named JEDNOTA - the left-wing party of Slovakia.
WeSlovakia (sk)	2015	Štefan Panenka	From 2015 to 2019 it was named Slovak Civic Coalition. From 2019 to 2023 it was named SOLIDARITY – Working Poverty Movement.
Nation and Justice – Our Party	2011	Anna Belousovová	The party split from Slovak National Party (SNS), until 2011 it was named Nation and Justice.
Rural Party	2010	Rudolf Huliak	From 2010 to 2013 the party was named Paliho Kapurková, Cheerful Political Party
ODS – Civic Democrats of Slovakia	2014	Pavel Macko	Until 2022 the party was named Trebiš's Voice.
Party of Modern Slovakia	2008	Milan Urbáni	The party split from the Movement for a Democratic Slovakia
Party of municipalities and cities - I AM SLOVAKIA	2022	Jozef Krúpa	
Party of the Roma Coalition	2009	Gejza Adam	
Patriotic bloc (sk)	2014	Ivan Stanovič	Until 2022 it was named JEDNOTA – The left-wing party of Slovakia.
People's Party Fortress Slovakia	1995	Martin Beluský	Until 2017 it was named People's Party.
People's Party Our Slovakia	2010	Marian Kotleba	
Pirate Party Slovakia	2010	Michal Pírek	Until 2015 it was named Our Region.
Republic Movement	2021	Milan Uhrík	
Slovak Democratic and Christian Union – Democratic Party	2000	Milan Roman	
Slovak Revival Movement (sk)	2004	Róbert Švec	
Srdce - Slovak National Unity - the party of patriots	1991	Vladimír Zeman	Until 2014 the party was named Slovak National Unityx
Socialisti.sk	2019	Artur Bekmatov	
The Blues – ES	2023	Mikuláš Dzurinda	
The work of the Slovak nation	2010	Roman Stopka	Until 2013 the party was named Slovak Democratic Alliance. From 2013 to 2016 the party was named HLAS - Democratic Alliance of Slovakia.
Union of the Slovak Self-Employed	2004	Vladimír Krivjaník	
United Slovak National Party	2003	Peter Lisý	Until 2004 the party was named Unitary Slovak National Party
We Are Family	2015	Boris Kollár	

== Inactive and defunct political parties ==
=== Parties in liquidation ===
There are dozens of political parties currently in the process of being liquidated.

=== Defunct parties (1989 – present) ===
- 99 Percent – Civic Voice - founded in 2011. Dissolved in 2023.
- Agrarian Countryside Party (Agrárna Strana Vidieka) - founded in 2003. Dissolved in 2022.
- Alliance of the New Citizen (Aliancia nového občana) – founded in 2001, government participation between 2002–05, extra-parliamentary since 2006, inactive in the late-2000s, legally succeeded by the 'Free Word Party of Nora Mojsejová' in 2011 and IDEA since 2013
- Christian People's Party (Kresťanská ľudová strana, KLS) - founded in 1998. Dissolved in 2018.
- Chance (ŠANCA) - founded in 2015. Dissolved in 2024. Merged into Democrats.
- Civic Democratic Union (Občianska demokratická únia) - arose in 1991, its members are now in the Democratic Party and the small Civic Conservative Party (Občianska konzervatívna strana)
- Civic Liberals (Občianski liberáli) - founded in 2004. Dissolved in 2020.
- Common Sense (Zdravý Rozum) - founded in 2013. From 2013 to 2024 it was named The Magnificent 7 Is the Way. Leader was Ján Baránek. Dissolved in 2026.
- Conservative Democrats of Slovakia (Konzervatívni demokrati Slovenska) - Dissolved in 2014.
- Democratic Party (Demokratická Strana)- founded in 2006. Until 2007 it was named Democratic Party Slovakia. Dissolved in 2024.
- Democratic Union (Demokratická únia) - in the government between 1998 and 2002, now part of the Slovak Democratic and Christian Union
- Direct Democracy (Priama Demokracia) - founded in 2008. Until 2013 it was named New Slovak Alternative, Civic-Liberal Party. Dissolved in 2022.
- European Democratic Party (Európska Demokratická Strana) - founded in 2006. Dissolved in 2019.
- Good Choice - Founded in 2019. Merged with Voice – Social Democracy in 2023.
- Green Party (Strana zelených) - Dissolved in 2022.
- Greens - Party of National Prosperity (Zelení-Strana národnej prosperity) - founded in 1990. Leader was Rudolf Pardubský. Until 2006 the party was named Party of National Prosperity. Dissolved in 2017.
- Green Wave (Zelená vlna) - founded in 2009 as AZEN – Alliance for Europe of Nations. Dissolved in 2017.
- Homeland (VLASŤ) - founded in 2011. Until 2019 it was named Civic Party TODAY. Dissolved in 2021.
- Labor Party (Strana práce) - founded in 1991. The party was active only in Košice and surrounding areas. Dissolved in 2022.
- Law and Justice (Právo a spravodlivosť) - founded in 2011. Leader was Peter Puškár. Dissolved in 2017.
- Left Bloc (Ľavicový blok) - merged into Direction - Social Democracy in 2007/2008
- Liberal Party - Formerly People's Union, the party split from the Movement for a Democratic Slovakia (HZDS) in 2003. Dissolved in 2021.
- Magnificat Slovakia - founded in 2012. Leader was Anton Selecký. The party is affiliated with the Christian NGO OZ Magnificat Slovakia. Dissolved in 2016.
- Modern Slovak Society (Slovenská moderná spoločnosť) - founded in 2001 as Independent Party of the Unemployed. Dissolved in 2017.
- Most-Híd - merged into Alliance (Slovak political party) in 2021.
- Most-Híd 2023 - founded in 2004 as Regions Party of Slovakia. From 2011 to 2013 it was named Party of Entrepreneurs of Slovakia. From 2013 to 2023 it was named Hungarian Christian Democratic Alliance. Dissolved in 2026.
- New Democracy (Nová Demokracia) - The party split from the Movement for a Democratic Slovakia in 2009. Leader was Tibor Mikuš. Dissolved in 2016.
- Ordinary People˙ (Obyčajní ľudia) - founded in 2005. Leader was Víťazoslav Moric.
- Party of Civic Understanding (Strana občianskeho porozumenia, SOP) - in the government between 1998 and 2002
- Party of the Democratic Left (Strana demokratickej ľavice) - before 2002, arose in 1990 from the Communist Party of Slovakia
- Party of the Democratic Left (Strana demokratickej ľavice, SDĽ) - Dissolved in 2015.
- Party of the Hungarian Community - merged into Alliance (Slovak political party) in 2021.
- Party of Patriots (Strana patriotov) - founded in 2010. Dissolved in 2018.
- Principle (PRINCÍP) - founded in 2010. Until 2016 it was named Party of the Roma Union in Slovakia. Dissolved in 2024.
- Public against Violence (Verejnosť proti násiliu) - the first party after the fall of the Communists in late 1989, ceased in 1991, split into the Movement for a Democratic Slovakia (HZDS) and the Civic Democratic Union (Občianska demokratická únia, ODU).
- Roma initiative of Slovakia (Rómska iniciatíva Slovenska) - founded in 1996. Until 2000 the party was named Roma Intelligence for Co-Habitation in the Slovak Republic. Dissolved in 2022.
- Slovak Conservative Party (Slovenská konzervatívna strana) - founded in 2014 as Network. In 2021 merged into Christian Democratic Movement. Dissolved in 2022.
- Slovak Democratic Coalition (Slovenská demokratická koalícia) - in existence from 1997 (as a coalition) / 1998 (as a party) to (?)2001, in the government from 1998 to 2001
- Slovak Green Party (Strana zelených Slovenska) - Dissolved in 2022.
- Initiative of Minorities (Slovenská Iniciatíva Menšín) - founded in 2022, dissolved in 2026.
- Slovak league (Slovenská liga) - founded in 2005 as Socialists. From 2005 to 2011 it was named Party of Civil Solidarity. From 2011 to 2019 it was named New Parliament. Dissolved in 2022.
- Slovak PATRIOT (Slovenský PATRIOT) - founded in 2021. Leader was Miroslav Radačovský. Dissolved in 2026.
- Slovak People's Party Andrej Hlinka (Slovenská ľudová strana Andreja Hlinku) - founded in 1990. From 1994 to 1995 the party was named SĽS - Slovak People's Bloc. Dissolved in 2024.
- Social Democratic Alternative (Sociálnodemokratická alternatíva)
- Social Democratic Party of Slovakia (Sociálnodemokratická strana Slovenska) - arose in 1990, see also Alexander Dubček
- The Blues – ES (Modrí – ES) - founded by Mikuláš Dzurinda in 2023. Dissolved in 2025.
- True Slovak National Party (Pravá Slovenská národná strana) - Founded by Ján Slota in 2001 after being forced out of the Slovak National Party (SNS) by Anna Belousovová (at that time called Anna Malíková), the two parties re-merged in 2005 after both failing to get seats in the Parliament.
- Union of the Workers of Slovakia (druženie robotníkov Slovenska) - Founded by Ján Ľupták in 1994 after split from the Party of the Democratic Left (SDĽ) by Peter Weiss. Part of the government between 1994 and 1998, the party dissolved in November 2017.
- United Slovakia (Jednotné Slovensko) - founded in 2000. Dissolved in 2018.
- We are Doing It for the Children - Free Forum - Dissolved in 2016.
- We Have Had Enough! (Máme toho dosť!) - Dissolved in 2022.

=== Political parties in Slovakia (1948–1989) ===
- Communist Party of Slovakia (1939) - leading force between 1948 and 1989
- Party of Slovak Revival (Strana slovenskej obrody) - arose in 1948 from the Democratic Party (see above, see also National Front (Czechoslovakia)), ceased in late 1989 when the new Democratic Party was founded (see above)

=== Political parties in Slovakia (1945–1948) ===
- Democratic Party (Demokratická strana) - an important party between 1944 and 1948, a new DS arose in 1989, since January 2006 part of the Slovak Democratic and Christian Union - Democratic Party
- Freedom Party (Strana slobody) - Christian Republican party led by Vavro Šrobár.
- Labour Party (Strana práce) - formed by Social Democrats who opposed cooperation with the Communist Party.

== See also ==
- Politics of Slovakia
- Lists of political parties
- Politics of Communist Czechoslovakia
- List of political parties in Czechoslovakia
