= Diana Štrofová =

Slovak politician

State Secretary at the Ministry of Foreign and European Affairs
- In office 4 July 2006 – 8 July 2010
- Prime Minister: Robert Fico
- Minister: Ján Kubiš; Miroslav Lajčák

Member of the National Council
- In office 4 July 2006 – 29 October 1998

Personal details
- Born: Diana Dubovská; 1 September 1973 (age 52) Bratislava, Czechoslovakia
- Party: Party of Civic Understanding (1998–2001); Movement for a Democratic Slovakia (2001-2010)
- Spouse(s): Jozef Majský (m. 1999; div. 2003) Jan Štrof (m. 2003; div. 2007)
- Children: 1

Diana Štrofová (née Dubovská; born 1 September 1973) is a Slovak politician. From 2006 to 2010 she served as the State Secretary at the Ministry of Foreign and European Affairs. From 1998 to 2006 she was an MP of the National Council.

== Biography ==
Diana Štrofová was born on 1 September 1973 in Bratislava as Diana Dubovská. As a 17 years old, she competed in Miss Slovakia contest. After graduating from high school, she worked as an air stewardess. From 1996 she worked at the company Sipox Holding, owned by the oligarch Jozef Majský, whom she married in 1999 bur retained her maiden name.

In 1998 Slovak presidential election, Dubovská won a seat on the list of the Party of Civic Understanding (SOP), financed by Majský. In 2001, she quit SOP. Right before the 2002 Slovak parliamentary election she joined the Movement for a Democratic Slovakia (HZDS), also funded by Majský. When some HZDS members protested that Dubovská, who just joined the party was given a more prominent position on the electoral list than some long-term members, the party leader Vladimír Mečiar argued Dubovská worked to the benefit of HZDS by undermining her former party from within.

Soon after the 2002 election, where Dubovská retained her seat, her husband Majský was accused of a large scale fraud and corruption. In October 2002, he was arrested at the border with Austria, apparently attempting to flee the country in a car with Dubovská using her diplomatic passport. According to some reports, Dubovská attempted to smuggle Majský hidden in her car trunk.

In 2003 Dubovská divorced the jailed Majský and started a relationship with the Czech businessman Jan Štrof. Dubovská married Štrof in 2004, taking his surname. In 2005 they had a daughter.

After 2006 Slovak parliamentary election, when HZDS joined the governing coalition, Štrofová became a government member as a state secretary at the Ministry of Foreign Affairs. In this capacity, she served until 2010. Meanwhile, she divorced Štrof but retained the surname Štrofová.

Following the 2010 Slovak parliamentary election, HZDS failed to pass the representation threshold, resulting in the end of Štrofová's political career. Subsequently, she returned to the private sector, becoming a communication manager in the renewable energy sector. In 2025, she became romantically involved with the philosopher Eduard Chmelár.
