= Communist Party of Slovakia – 91 =

Communist Party of Slovakia – 91 Komunistická strana Slovenska – 91
- Leader: Július Feješ
- Founded: 6 March 1991
- Dissolved: 29 August 1992
- Split from: Party of the Democratic Left
- Merged into: Communist Party of Slovakia
- Ideology: Communism; Marxism-Leninism

The Communist Party of Slovakia (Slovak: Komunistická strana Slovenska – 91, KSS '91) was a communist party in Slovakia from 1991 to 1992.

KSS '91 was formed by orthodox elements of the original Communist Party of Slovakia (KSS), which opposed the mutation of KSS into the Party of the Democratic Left. KSS '91 was registered at the Slovak authorities on 6 March 1991.

The first party conference was held on 29–30 June 1991 in Zvolen.

KSS '91 contested the 1992 elections in the Czech and Slovak Federative Republic. KSS '91 promoted keeping the unity of Czechoslovakia.

The party developed links to the Communist League of Slovakia (ZKS). In 1992, KSS '91 and ZKS merged to form the new Communist Party of Slovakia.
