= 1994 Slovak parliamentary election =

- 30 September–1 October 1994

All 150 seats in the National Council 76 seats needed for a majority
- Turnout: 75.65% (▼8.52 pp)
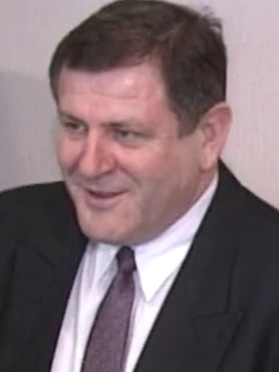

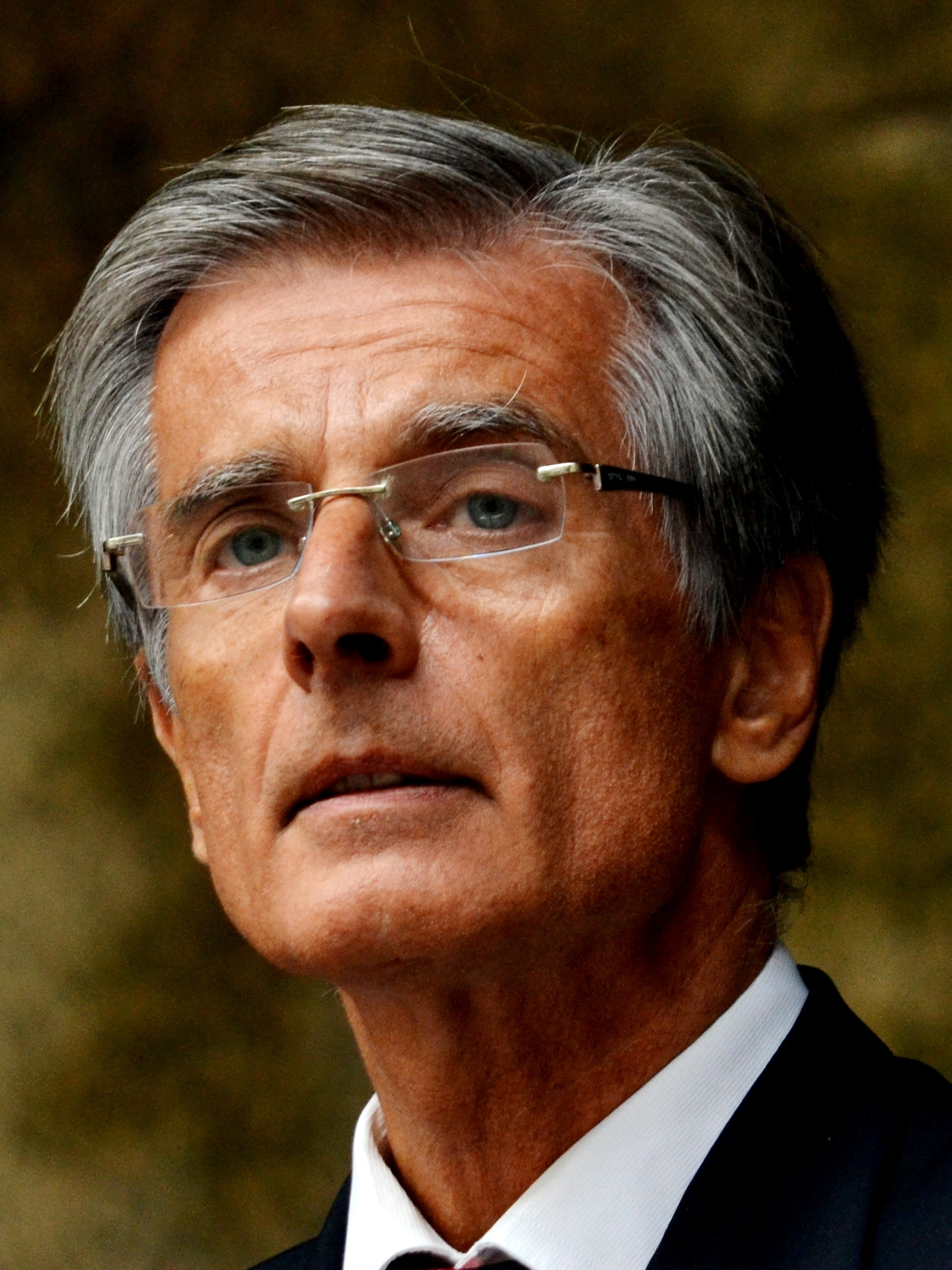

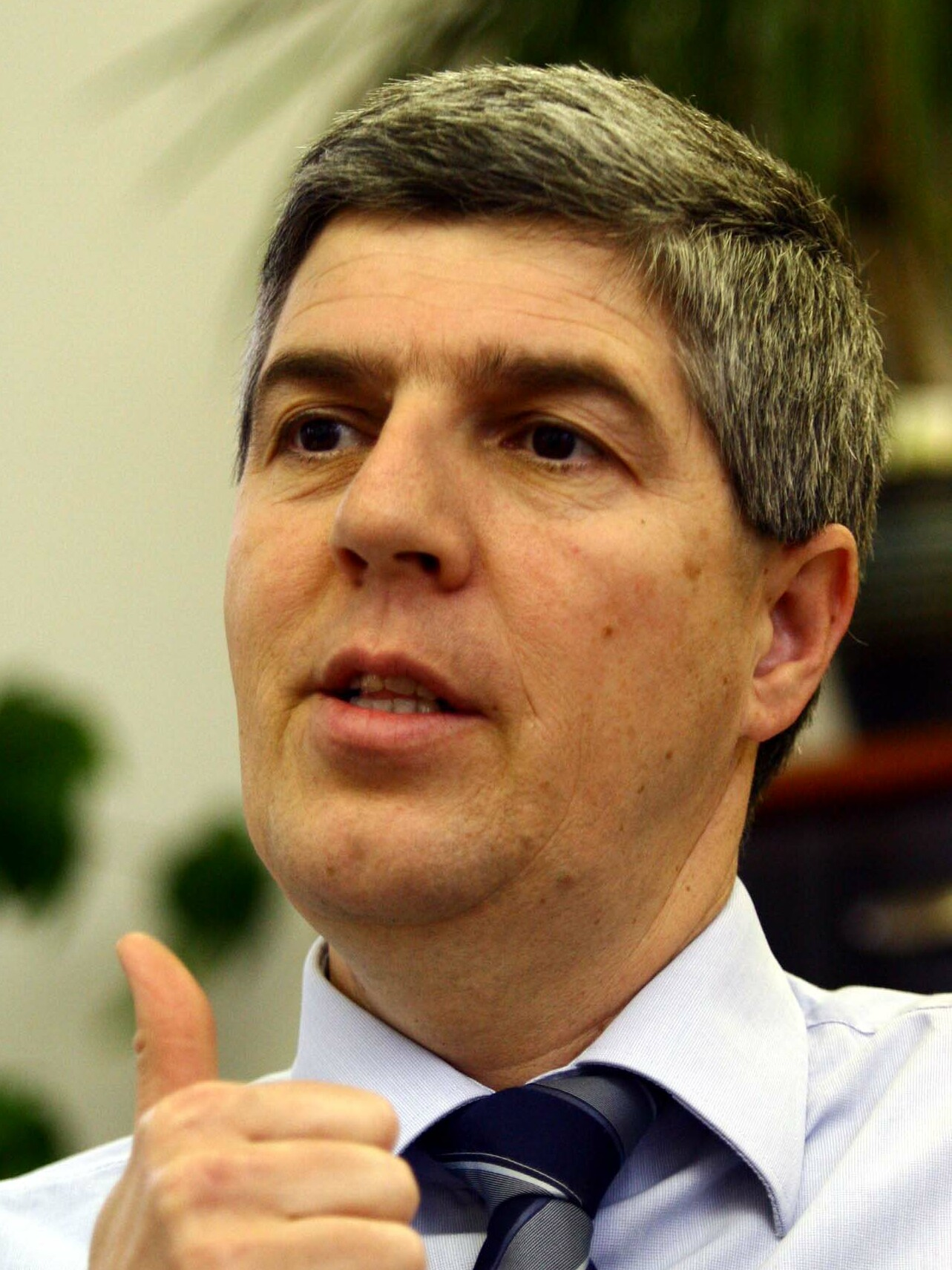

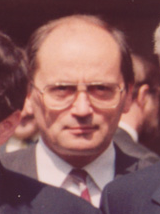

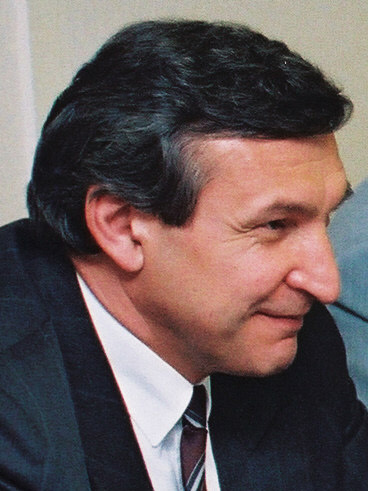

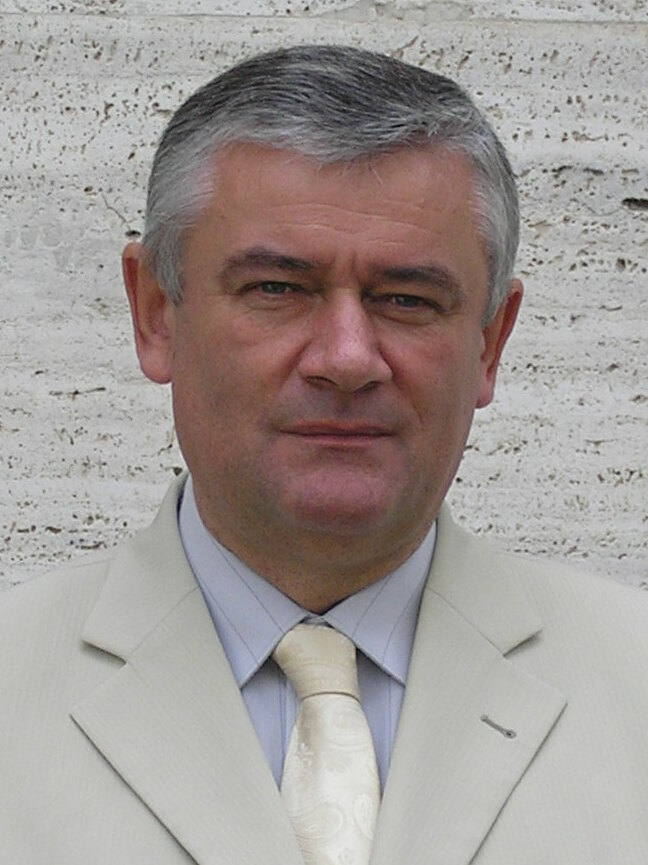
	First party	Second party	Third party
Leader	Vladimír Mečiar	Peter Weiss	Béla Bugár
Party	HZDS	SDĽ	MKDM/MKDH
Alliance	HZDS–RSS	SV	MK
Last election	74 seats, 37.3%	29 seats, 19.8% (Note: Combined results of the 1992 election for SDĽ (29 seats, 14.7%), and the non-parliamentary SDSS, SZ, and HP.)	14 seats, 9.7%
Seats won	61	18	17
Seat change	▼13	▼11	▲3
Popular vote	1,005,488	299,496	292,936
Percentage	35.0%	10.4%	10.2%
Swing	▼2.3 pp	▼9.4 pp	▲0.5 pp
	Fourth party	Fifth party	Sixth party
Leader	Ján Čarnogurský	Jozef Moravčík	Ján Ľupták
Party	KDH	DEÚS	ZRS
Last election	18 seats, 8.9 %	Did not exist	Did not exist
Seats won	17	15	13
Seat change	▼1	New	New
Popular vote	289,987	246,444	211,321
Percentage	10.1%	8.6%	7.4%
Swing	▲1.2 pp	New	New
	Seventh party
Leader	Ján Slota
Party	SNS
Last election	15 seats, 8.0%
Seats won	9
Seat change	▼6
Popular vote	155,359
Percentage	5.4%
Swing	▼2.5 pp
Prime Minister before election
Jozef Moravčík
DEÚS
Elected Prime Minister
Vladimír Mečiar
HZDS

Early parliamentary elections were held in Slovakia on 30 September and 1 October 1994, the first after the country's independence on 1 January 1993. Regular elections were scheduled to be held in 1996. However, in March 1994 the government of Vladimír Mečiar lost a no-confidence vote, and a temporary coalition government led by Jozef Moravčík took over. The Party of the Democratic Left (SDĽ), the most dominant member of the coalition, had pushed for snap elections, expecting to benefit from favourable opinion polls.

The Movement for a Democratic Slovakia (HZDS), running in a coalition with the Peasants' Party of Slovakia (RSS), secured fewer seats than in the 1992 federal-era election, but remained the largest party in the National Council. The second-placed Common Choice (SV), a centre-left alliance, severely underperformed its pre-election polling and barely crossed the 10% threshold for coalitions of four or more parties. Following the election, the HZDS formed a majority governing coalition with the Union of the Workers of Slovakia (ZRS) and the Slovak National Party (SNS).

== Participating parties ==
Party	Ideology	Political position	Leader
Movement for a Democratic Slovakia (HZDS)	Conservatism	Syncretic	Vladimír Mečiar
Common Choice (SV)	Social democracy	Centre-left	Peter Weiss
Hungarian Coalition (MKDM/MKDH–EGY–MPP)	Hungarian minority interests	Centre-right	Béla Bugár
Christian Democratic Movement (KDH)	Christian democracy	Centre-right	Ján Čarnogurský
Democratic Union of Slovakia (DEÚS)	Liberal conservatism	Centre	Jozef Moravčík
Union of the Workers of Slovakia (ZRS)	Left-wing populism	Far-left	Ján Ľupták
Slovak National Party (SNS)	Ultranationalism	Far-right	Ján Slota

== Results ==
Party	Votes	%	+/–	Seats	+/–
Movement for a Democratic Slovakia–Peasants' Party of Slovakia	1,005,488	34.97	–2.29	61	–13
Common Choice	299,496	10.42	–9.36	18	–11
Hungarian Coalition (MKM–E–MPP)	292,936	10.19	+0.47	17	+3
Christian Democratic Movement	289,987	10.08	+1.20	17	–1
Democratic Union of Slovakia	246,444	8.57	New	15	New
Union of the Workers of Slovakia	211,321	7.35	New	13	New
Slovak National Party	155,359	5.40	–2.53	9	–6
Democratic Party	98,555	3.43	+0.12	0	0
Communist Party of Slovakia	78,419	2.73	+1.97	0	0
Christian Social Union	59,217	2.06	–0.99	0	0
New Slovakia	38,369	1.33	New	0	New
Anti-Corruption Party	37,929	1.32	New	0	New
Movement for a Prosperous Czech Republic and Slovakia	30,292	1.05	New	0	New
Roma Civic Initiative	19,542	0.68	+0.08	0	0
Social Democracy	7,121	0.25	New	0	New
Real Social Democratic Party of Slovaks	3,573	0.12	New	0	New
Rally for the Republic–The Republicans	1,410	0.05	–0.28	0	0
Total	2,875,458	100.00	–	150	0
Valid votes	2,875,458	98.05			
Invalid/blank votes	57,211	1.95			
Total votes	2,932,669	100.00			
Registered voters/turnout	3,876,555	75.65			
Source: Nohlen & Stöver
