= Union of Communists of Slovakia =

Union of Communists of Slovakia Zväz komunistov Slovenska
- Leader: Juraj Janošovský
- Founded: 19 March 1991
- Dissolved: 29 August 1992
- Split from: Party of the Democratic Left
- Merged into: Communist Party of Slovakia
- Headquarters: Bratislava
- Ideology: Communism

The Union of Communists of Slovakia (Slovak: Zväz komunistov Slovenska, ZKS) was a communist party in Slovakia (Czech and Slovak Federative Republic) in 1991–1992. Juraj Janošovský was the party chairman.

== Formation of the party ==
ZKS emerged from the Communist Refoundation Platform of KSS (Platforma komunistickej obnovy KSS, PKO), a faction formed inside the Communist Party of Slovakia (KSS) in 1990. In March 1991 PKO formed ZKS as a new party. ZKS was registered with the Ministry of Interior of the Slovak Republic in Bratislava on March 19, 1991.

== Political line ==
The formation of the party was announced at a press conference held in Bratislava on April 17, 1991. The chairman of the preparatory committee of the party was Pavel Koyš, former Minister of Culture. ZKS did not position itself as a successor party of the erstwhile Communist Party of Slovakia (KSS), and rejected what it labelled as 'Stalinist and neo-Stalinist' practices of the earlier communist government. ZKS pledged to apply Marxism-Leninism creatively, rejecting the notion of the Dictatorship of the Proletariat and the role of the vanguard party. The party favoured an equal federation between the Czech Lands and Slovakia. ZKS positioned itself as a leftist alternative to the mainstream post-communist Party of the Democratic Left (SDL). The party had a significant number of former members of the Slovak Academy of Sciences amongst its ranks.

== Alliances ==
Ahead of the 1992 elections ZKS, Communist Party of Slovakia – 91 (KSS '91), the Bratislava Left Alternative (LA), the Workers Forum (FR) and the Party of Romani Integration formed a Slovak 'left bloc'. ZKS and KSS '91 were close, but there were certain key differences. KSS '91 adhered to the political line of Alexander Dubček, whilst ZKS sought to distance itself from the previous regime. Moreover, KSS '91 was politically close to the Communist Party of Bohemia and Moravia (KSČM) and obtained material support from their Czech brother party. ZKS had contacts with KSČM, and KSČM appealed to both ZKS and KSS '91 to join the KSČM-SDL Federation.

== 1992 elections ==
ZKS and KSS '91 decided to contest the elections jointly. However, the electoral legislation did not allow two parties to pool their votes together to reach the electoral threshold. ZKS and KSS '91 opted for a Solomonic solution, contesting under the KSS '91 banner for the Slovak parliamentary election and under the ZKS banner for the federal parliamentary election. The ZKS-KSS '91 alliance in the federal election, participating with the ZKS registration, fielded 28 candidates for the House of the Peoples and 26 candidates for the House of the Nations. The ZKS candidature obtained 23,487 votes (0.76% of the votes in Slovakia).

== Unification Congress ==
Following the June 1992 elections, ZKS and KSS '91 speeded up the process of uniting the two parties. At an unification congress held in Banská Bystrica held on August 29, 1992 (anniversary of the Slovak National Uprising), ZKS and KSS '91 merged into a new Communist Party of Slovakia (KSS). The new KSS inherited the legal personality of ZKS. Vladimír Ďaďo of KSS '91 became the chairman of the new party and Ladislav Jača of ZKS the General Secretary.
