= Juraj Hraško =

Slovak soil scientist and politician (1931–2026)

Minister of Environment of Slovakia
- In office 15 March 1994 – 13 December 1994
- Preceded by: Jozef Zlocha
- Succeeded by: Jozef Zlocha

Member of the National Council
- In office 1992–1994

Personal details
- Born: 14 May 1931 Točnica, Czechoslovakia
- Died: 27 September 2026 (aged 95)
- Party: Party of the Democratic Left
- Education: V. V. Dokuchaev Agricultural Institute, Kharkiv
- Occupation: Pedologist, academic, politician, diplomat
- Awards: Klement Gottwald State Prize (1984); Order of Ľudovít Štúr, 1st class (2001)

Juraj Hraško (14 May 1931 – 27 September 2026) was a Slovak soil scientist, academic and politician. Regarded as the founder of modern Slovak pedology, he established and long directed the Research Institute of Soil Science and Plant Nutrition in Bratislava, was a full member of the Slovak Academy of Sciences, and served as Minister of Environment in 1994 and later as Slovak ambassador to Switzerland.

== Early life and education ==
Hraško was born in Točnica, Lučenec District, on 14 May 1931, into a smallholder farming family. He studied at the Faculty of Soil Science and Agrochemistry of the V. V. Dokuchaev Agricultural Institute in Kharkiv, graduating in 1955. He obtained the CSc. degree in 1964 and the DrSc. in 1974, was a Humboldt Foundation fellow at the Institute of Soil Science of the University of Bonn (1966–1967), and was appointed professor of pedology in 1982.

== Scientific career ==
After returning from the Soviet Union, Hraško headed the soil science and agrochemistry department of the Central Agricultural Control and Testing Institute (ÚKSUP) in Bratislava. In 1960 he was tasked with setting up a soil science laboratory of the Czechoslovak Academy of Agricultural Sciences, which developed into the Research Institute of Soil Science and Plant Nutrition, the predecessor of today's Soil Science and Conservation Research Institute. He was its founding director until 1987 and then directed the Soil Fertility Research Centre (1987–1988). He also taught at the Faculty of Natural Sciences of Comenius University (1981–1989), was a visiting professor in Bonn (1989–1990), and worked at the Institute of Forest Ecology of the Slovak Academy of Sciences (1989–1991).

His research dealt with soil genesis, soil chemistry, soil classification and soil geography. He was elected a corresponding member of the Slovak Academy of Sciences in 1980 and of the Czechoslovak Academy of Sciences in 1981, and a full member of the Slovak Academy of Sciences in 1987. Internationally, he sat on the council of the International Society of Soil Science (1972–1988).

From 1995 to 1998 he was professor and the first head of the Department of Sustainable Development at the Slovak University of Agriculture in Nitra.

== Political and diplomatic career ==
From 1976 to 1990 Hraško was Czechoslovakia's government plenipotentiary for the protection of ecosystems and landscape in the Council for Mutual Economic Assistance. He entered parliamentary politics in 1992 as a member of the National Council of the Slovak Republic for the Party of the Democratic Left (SDĽ), serving as vice-chair of its environment committee and chair of the committee on the Gabčíkovo waterworks dispute. He was Minister of Environment in the Jozef Moravčík government from 15 March to 13 December 1994. In 1999 he was appointed Slovak ambassador to Switzerland.

== Death ==
Hraško died on 27 September 2026, at the age of 95. His death was announced by the Slovak University of Agriculture in Nitra on 28 September.

== Honours ==
- Klement Gottwald State Prize (1984)
- Order of Ľudovít Štúr, 1st class (2001), awarded by president Rudolf Schuster for Hraško's lifetime scientific work in pedology

== Selected works ==
- Rozbory pôd [Soil analyses] (1962)
- Černozeme Podunajskej nížiny: problémy ich genézy a klasifikácie [Chernozems of the Danubian Lowland: problems of their genesis and classification] (Slovak Academy of Sciences, 1966)
- Základy pedológie a pedogenézy [Fundamentals of pedology and pedogenesis] (Comenius University, 1983)
