= Strana zelených =

Strana zelených can refer to one of several Green parties:

- For Czech Republic, see Green Party (Czech Republic)
- For Slovakia, see Green Party (Slovakia)
