= Petrak =

Petrak or Petrák is a surname derived from the given name Peter. Notable people with the surname include:

- Bernard Petrák (born 1999), Slovak footballer
- Franz Petrak (1886–1973), Austrian-Czech mycologist
- Ľubomír Petrák (1961–2021), Slovak politician
- Oliver Petrak (born 1991), Croatian footballer
- Ondřej Petrák (born 1992), Czech footballer
