= Jozef Hrdlička =

Slovak politician

Leader of the Communist Party of Slovakia
- Incumbent
- Assumed office 6 September 2008
- Preceded by: Vladimír Ďaďo

Personal details
- Born: 29 July 1977 (age 48) Czechoslovakia
- Party: Communist Party of Slovakia

Jozef Hrdlička (born 29 July 1977) is a Slovak politician and leader of the Communist Party of Slovakia (KSS). He was elected as a Member of the National Council in the 2002 parliamentary election, remaining in parliament until 2006.
