= Union of the Workers of Slovakia =

Union of the Workers of Slovakia Združenie robotníkov Slovenska
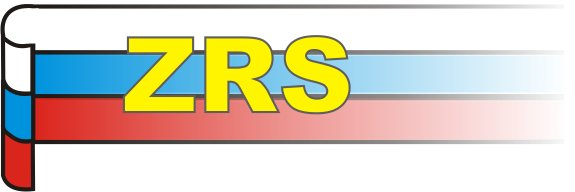
- Abbreviation: ZRS
- Leader: Ján Ľupták
- Founded: 26 April 1994
- Dissolved: 28 November 2017
- Split from: Party of the Democratic Left
- Headquarters: Nám. Š. Moysesa 31/3, Banská Bystrica
- Membership (2008): ▼32
- Ideology: Left-wing populism
- Political position: Far-left
- Colours: Red

The Union of the Workers of Slovakia (Slovak: Združenie robotníkov Slovenska, ZRS) was a far-left political party in Slovakia.

== History ==
The Union of the Workers of Slovakia (Združenie robotníkov Slovenska, ZRS) split from the Party of the Democratic Left (SDL) in 1994. In the 1994 parliamentary election the party gained 7.34% of the votes and 13 seats. It entered the coalition of the People's Party – Movement for a Democratic Slovakia and the Slovak National Party. The ZRS occupied the Ministry of Privatization to ensure that key industries remained under state control. The ZRS stated on its webpage that it had prevented privatizations in the gas industry, energy sector, telecommunications, banks and insurance.

The ZRS had no international affiliations and did not run in the 2004 or 2009 European Parliament elections.

In the 1998 parliamentary election the ZRS received 1.30% of the votes. The ZRS received 0.54% of the vote in 2002 and 0.29% in 2006. In the 2010 parliamentary election the party received 0.24% of the votes – below the poll's error margin of 0.6%.

The president of the ZRS was Ján Ľupták.

The party dissolved in November 2017.
