= Green Party (Slovakia) =

Green Party Strana zelených
- Leader: Pavel Petrik
- Founded: 9 November 1989
- Dissolved: 23 March 2022
- Headquarters: Sienkiewiczova 4 Bratislava; 811 09
- Membership (2020): 15
- Ideology: Green politics Pro-Europeanism
- Political position: Centre-left
- National affiliation: Common Choice (1994–1997); Slovak Democratic Coalition (1997–2000)
- International affiliation: Global Greens
- Colours: Green

The Green Party (Slovak: Strana zelených, SZ), between October 1991 and January 2006 called the Green Party in Slovakia (Slovak: Strana zelených na Slovensku), was an environmentalist political party in Slovakia without parliamentary representation.

== History ==
The Green Party was founded on 9 December 1989 as a Czechoslovakia-wide party, and was the second green party in post-communist countries. It was registered on 3 February 1990 and three branches were set up – Bohemian, Moravian-Silesian and Slovak. The first congress of the Slovak branch was held in February 1990 in Banská Bystrica, with Juraj Mesík elected as chairman.

In the 1990 Slovak elections the party received 3.1% of the vote, winning six of the 150 seats in the National Council. The combined party failed to win any seats in the nationwide elections. On 21 October 1991 the Slovak branch of the party was officially registered as a separate party with the Ministry of the Interior as the Green Party in Slovakia.

In the 1992 Slovak elections the party's vote share fell to 2.1% and it lost all six seats. Prior to the 1994 elections the party joined the Common Choice alliance. The alliance finished in second place, winning 18 seats, of which two were taken by the Greens.

In June 1995 the party became the 28th full member of the European Green Party but is no member anymore in 2020.

It joined the Slovak Democratic Coalition (SDK) in the buildup to the 1998 elections. With the SDK winning 42 seats, the Greens took four seats. The party contested the 2002 elections alone, but received only 1% of the vote and failing to win a seat.

In 2006 it changed its name from the Green Party of Slovakia to the Green Party. It had some candidates on the Free Forum list in the 2006 elections, but failed to win a seat. In the 2010 elections it had candidates on the Party of the Democratic Left list, again failing to win a seat. They contested the 2012 elections alone, receiving 0.4% of the vote, remaining seatless.

== See also ==
- Green party
- Green politics
- List of environmental organizations
