= Radzovce =

Radzovce Ragyolc
- Municipality
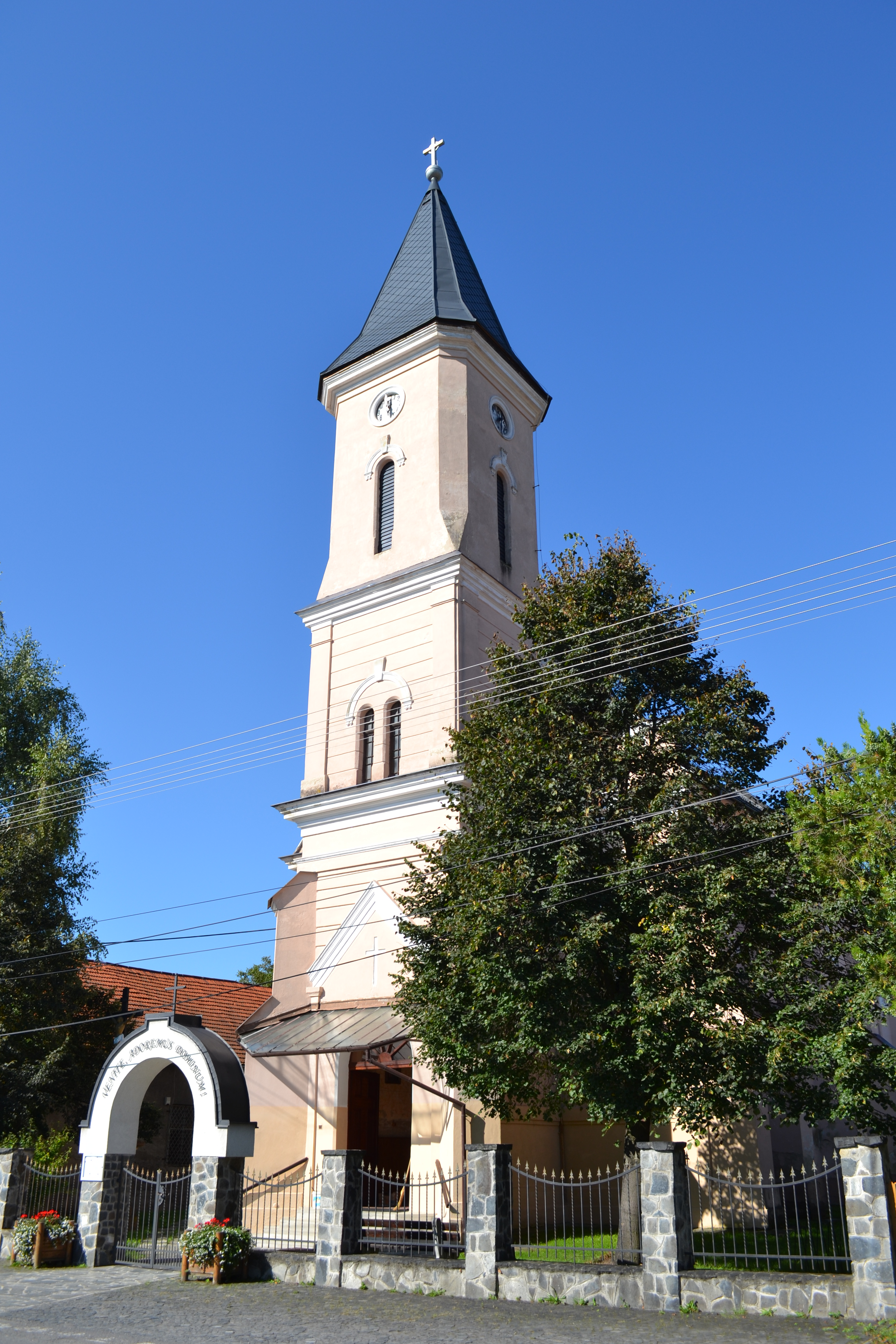

- Flag Coat of arms

- Location of Radzovce in the Banská Bystrica Region Location of Radzovce in Slovakia
- Coordinates: 48.22°N 19.83°E
- Country: Slovakia
- Region: Banská Bystrica Region
- District: Lučenec District
- First mentioned: 1246

Area
  - Total: 18.78 km^{2} (7.25 sq mi)
- Elevation: 261 m (856 ft)

Population (2025)
  - Total: 1,562
- Time zone: UTC+1 (CET)
  - Summer (DST): UTC+2 (CEST)
- Postal code: 985 58
- Area code: +421 47
- Vehicle registration plate (until 2022): LC
- Website: www.radzovce.sk

Radzovce (Hungarian: Ragyolc) is a village and municipality in the Lučenec District in the Banská Bystrica Region of Slovakia. The zip code of the village is 98558. The population nationality consist of 80% Hungarian and 20% Slovak.

== Geography ==
The municipality lies at an altitude of 261 metres (856 ft) and covers an area of 18.78 km^{2} (7.25 sq mi) (2025).

== Population ==
Population statistic (10 years)
Year	1995	2005	2015	2025
Count	1621	1610	1551	1562
Difference		−0.67%	−3.66%	+0.70%

Population statistic
Year	2024	2025
Count	1557	1562
Difference		+0.32%

It has a population of 1562 people (31 December 2025).

=== Ethnicity ===
Census 2021 (1+%)
Ethnicity	Number	Fraction
Hungarian	1112	69.41%
Slovak	523	32.64%
Not found out	38	2.37%
Romani	35	2.18%
Total	1602	

In year 2021 was 1602 people by ethnicity 1112 as Hungarian, 523 as Slovak, 38 as Not found out, 35 as Romani, 6 as Czech, 1 as Russian, 1 as Romanian, 1 as Polish, 1 as German and 1 as Other.

Note on population: The difference values of population numbers in the table "Population statistic" and in the sections "Ethnicity" & "Religion" is caused by the use of various statistical methods.

=== Religion ===
Census 2021 (1+%)
Religion	Number	Fraction
Roman Catholic Church	1262	78.78%
None	228	14.23%
Not found out	34	2.12%
Christian Congregations in Slovakia	19	1.19%
Evangelical Church	16	1%
Total	1602	

In year 2021 was 1602 people by religion 1262 from Roman Catholic Church, 228 from None, 34 from Not found out, 19 from Christian Congregations in Slovakia, 16 from Evangelical Church, 14 from Greek Catholic Church, 7 from Calvinist Church, 6 from Old Catholic Church, 6 from Seventh-day Adventist Church, 5 from Jehovah's Witnesses, 2 from Other, 1 from Eastern Orthodox Church, 1 from Other and not ascertained christian church and 1 from Hinduism.

== Notable people ==
- Ján Ľupták (1946–2025), politician
