= Ľubomír Petrák =

Slovak politician (1961–2021)

Member of the National Council of the Slovak Republic
- In office 2006–2021

Former mayor of Hurbanova Ves
- In office 1992–2021

Personal details
- Born: 6 August 1961 Myjava, Czechoslovakia
- Died: 20 February 2021 (aged 59) Bratislava, Slovakia
- Party: SDĽ (until 2004); SMER-SD
- Education: Slovak University of Technology in Bratislava

Ľubomír Petrák (6 August 1961 – 20 February 2021) was a Slovak politician, a member of the National Council of the Slovak Republic for SMER-SD and the mayor of Hurbanova Ves.

== Biography ==
Petrák graduated from the Faculty of Mechanical Engineering at the Slovak University of Technology in Bratislava.

=== Political career ===
Ľubomír Petrák was the mayor of the small village Hurbanova Ves in the Senec District.

In 2002, he became the last chairman of the Party of the Democratic Left (SDĽ). On 4 December 2004, at the 10th Congress of the SDĽ in Banská Bystrica, the dissolution of the party was approved by merging with SMER as of 31 December 2004.

He was a member of the National Council of the Slovak Republic for SMER-SD continuously since 2006. In 2016, he became the chairman of the committee for education, science, youth, and sports, and was a member of the committee for European affairs.

Petrák died on 20 February 2021.
