= Točnica =

Točnica Tósár
- Municipality
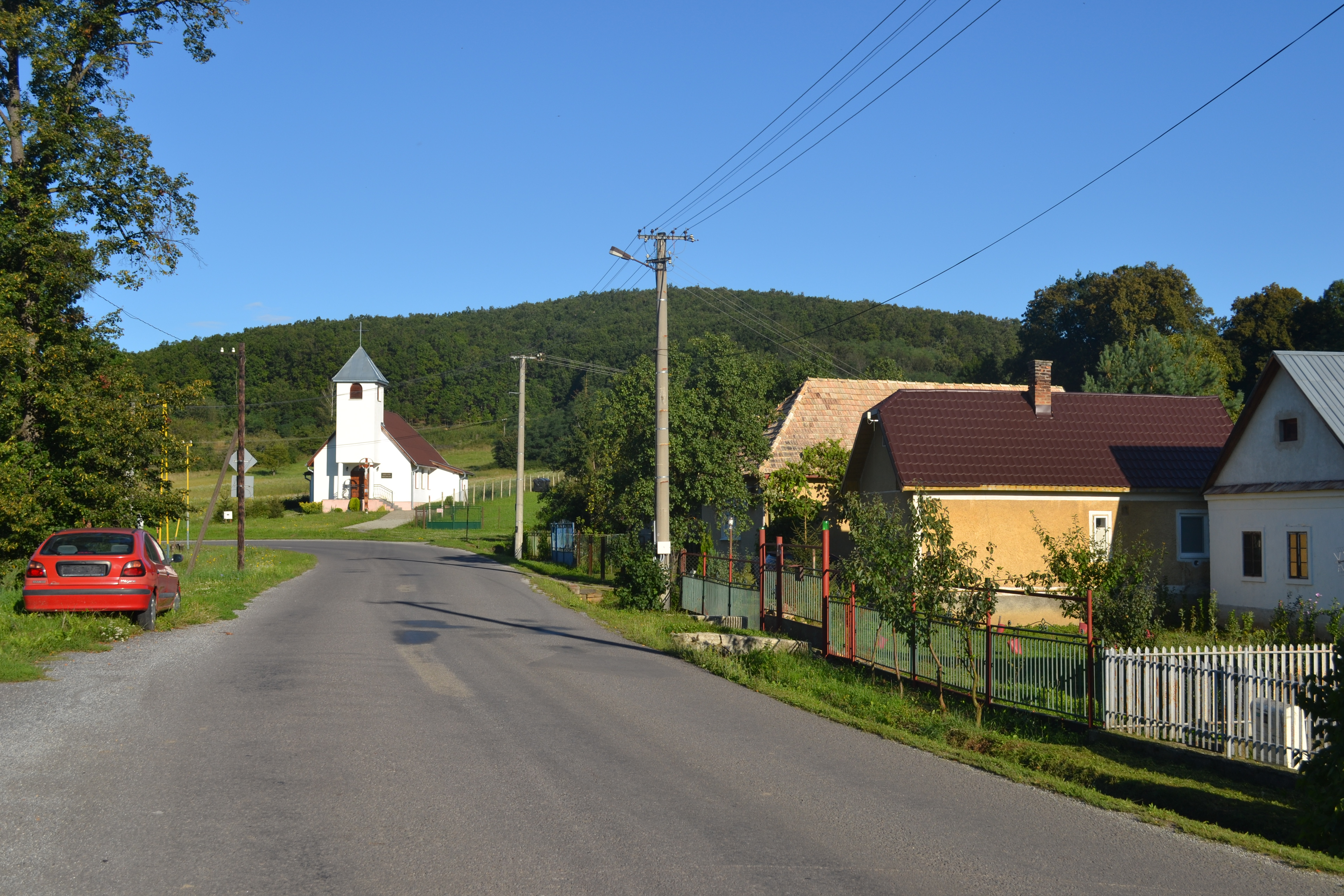

- Flag

- Location of Točnica in the Banská Bystrica Region Location of Točnica in Slovakia
- Coordinates: 48.42°N 19.65°E
- Country: Slovakia
- Region: Banská Bystrica Region
- District: Lučenec District
- First mentioned: 1467

Area
  - Total: 11.92 km^{2} (4.60 sq mi)
- Elevation: 261 m (856 ft)

Population (2025)
  - Total: 385
- Time zone: UTC+1 (CET)
  - Summer (DST): UTC+2 (CEST)
- Postal code: 985 22
- Area code: +421 47
- Vehicle registration plate (until 2022): LC
- Website: www.tocnica.sk

Točnica (Hungarian: Tósár) is a village and municipality in the Lučenec District in the Banská Bystrica Region of Slovakia.

== Geography ==
The municipality lies at an altitude of 261 metres (856 ft) and covers an area of 11.92 km^{2} (4.60 sq mi) (2025).

== Population ==
Population statistic (10 years)
Year	1995	2005	2015	2025
Count	290	320	400	385
Difference		+10.34%	+25%	−3.75%

Population statistic
Year	2024	2025
Count	392	385
Difference		−1.78%

It has a population of 385 people (31 December 2025).

=== Ethnicity ===
Census 2021 (1+ %)
Ethnicity	Number	Fraction
Slovak	371	95.61%
Not found out	12	3.09%
Romani	8	2.06%
Total	388	

In year 2021 was 388 people by ethnicity 371 as Slovak, 12 as Not found out, 8 as Romani, 2 as Hungarian, 1 as Russian and 1 as Other.

Note on population: The difference values of population numbers in the table "Population statistic" and in the sections "Ethnicity" & "Religion" is caused by the use of various statistical methods.

=== Religion ===
Census 2021 (1+ %)
Religion	Number	Fraction
None	150	38.66%
Roman Catholic Church	138	35.57%
Evangelical Church	83	21.39%
Not found out	12	3.09%
Total	388	

In year 2021 was 388 people by religion 150 from None, 138 from Roman Catholic Church, 83 from Evangelical Church, 12 from Not found out, 3 from Ad hoc movements, 1 from Jehovah's Witnesses and 1 from United Methodist Church.
