= Hurbanova Ves =

Hurbanova Ves Hurbánfalva
- Municipality
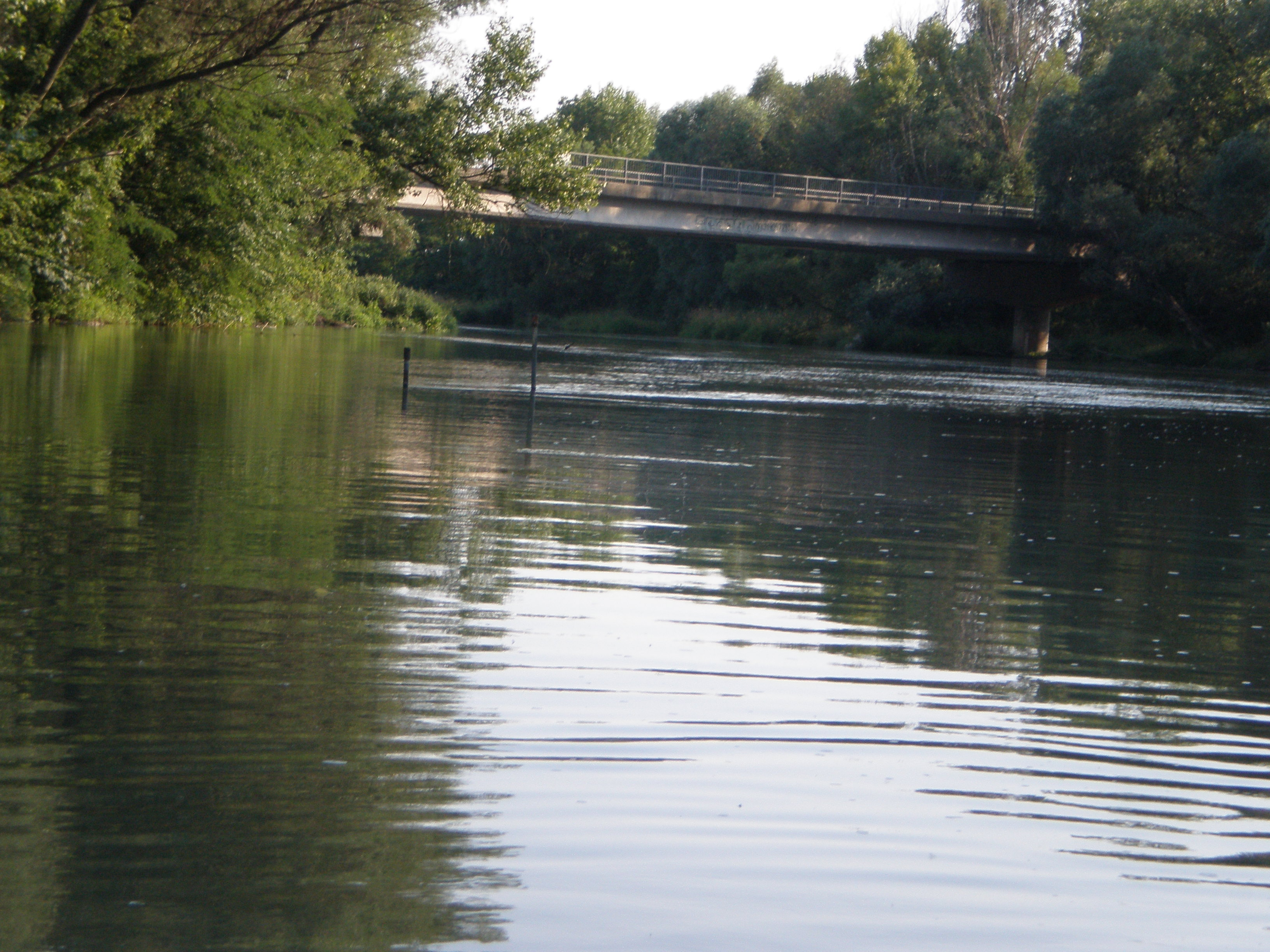

- Flag

- Location of Hurbanova Ves in the Bratislava Region Location of Hurbanova Ves in Slovakia
- Coordinates: 48.15°N 17.42°E
- Country: Slovakia
- Region: Bratislava Region
- District: Senec District
- First mentioned: 1960

Area
  - Total: 5.41 km^{2} (2.09 sq mi)
- Elevation: 124 m (407 ft)

Population (2025)
  - Total: 708
- Time zone: UTC+1 (CET)
  - Summer (DST): UTC+2 (CEST)
- Postal code: 903 01
- Area code: +421 7
- Vehicle registration plate (until 2022): SC
- Website: hurbanovaves.sk

Hurbanova Ves (Hungarian: Hurbánfalva or Hurbanfalva) is a village and municipality in western Slovakia in Senec District in the Bratislava Region.

== History ==
In historical records the village was first mentioned in 1960.

== Geography ==
The municipality lies at an altitude of 124 metres (407 ft) and covers an area of 5.41 km^{2} (2.09 sq mi) (2025).

== Population ==
Population statistic (10 years)
Year	1995	2005	2015	2025
Count	206	263	306	708
Difference		+27.66%	+16.34%	+131.37%

Population statistic
Year	2024	2025
Count	702	708
Difference		+0.85%

It has a population of 708 people (31 December 2025).

=== Ethnicity ===
Census 2021 (1+ %)
Ethnicity	Number	Fraction
Slovak	470	88.84%
Hungarian	48	9.07%
Not found out	11	2.07%
Other	11	2.07%
Czech	7	1.32%
Total	529	

In year 2021 was 529 people by ethnicity 470 as Slovak, 48 as Hungarian, 11 as Not found out, 11 as Other, 7 as Czech, 2 as Russian, 1 as Romani, 1 as Rusyn and 1 as Moravian.

Note on population: The difference values of population numbers in the table "Population statistic" and in the sections "Ethnicity" & "Religion" is caused by the use of various statistical methods.

=== Religion ===
Census 2021 (1+ %)
Religion	Number	Fraction
Roman Catholic Church	239	45.18%
None	206	38.94%
Evangelical Church	44	8.32%
Not found out	13	2.46%
Greek Catholic Church	7	1.32%
Apostolic Church	7	1.32%
Ad hoc movements	6	1.13%
Total	529	

In year 2021 was 529 people by religion 239 from Roman Catholic Church, 206 from None, 44 from Evangelical Church, 13 from Not found out, 7 from Greek Catholic Church, 7 from Apostolic Church, 6 from Ad hoc movements, 3 from Eastern Orthodox Church, 2 from Calvinist Church, 1 from Other and not ascertained christian church and 1 from Islam.

Population by nationality:

Nationality	1991	2001
Slovaks	67.89%	78.51%
Hungarians	31.05%	15.35%
Czechs	1.05%	2.63%

== External links/Sources ==
Media related to Hurbanova Ves at Wikimedia Commons

- Official page
- https://web.archive.org/web/20070513023228/http://www.statistics.sk/mosmis/eng/run.html
