= Communist Party of Slovakia =

Communist Party of Slovakia Komunistická strana Slovenska
- Leader: Jozef Hrdlička
- Founded: 29 August 1992
- Merger of: KSS '91; ZKS
- Headquarters: Bratislava
- Newspaper: Kroky (The Steps)
- Membership (2022): 1,547 (▼239)
- Ideology: Communism; Marxism–Leninism
- Political position: Far-left
- European affiliation: INITIATIVE; PEL (Observer)
- International affiliation: IMCWP
- Colours: Red
- Slogan: Záruka lepšieho života (A guarantee of a better life)
- National Council: 0 / 150
- European Parliament: 0 / 15
- Presidents of self-governing regions: 0 / 8
- Regional parliaments: 0 / 408
- Local councils: 62 / 20,646

Party flag

Website
- www.kss.sk

The Communist Party of Slovakia (Slovak: Komunistická strana Slovenska, KSS) is a Marxist-Leninist party in Slovakia. It was formed in 1992 through the merger of the Communist Party of Slovakia – 91 and the Communist League of Slovakia.

The party is observer of the Party of the European Left although it criticizes the Political Theses for the 1st Congress of European Left. For the 2019 European Parliament election the KSS formed a unity list together with VZDOR – strana práce. The list was called Socialistický Front. It received 0.62% of the votes.

== Electoral results ==
Results since 1992 (year links to election page)
Year	Leader	Type of Election	Votes	%	Seats
1992	Vladimír Ďaďo	Parliament	23,349	0.76%	0
1994	Vladimír Ďaďo	Parliament	78,419	2.73%	0
1998	Vladimír Ďaďo	Parliament	94,015	2.79%	0
2002	Jozef Ševc	Parliament	181,872	6.33%	11
2004	Jozef Ševc	European Parliament	31,908	4.54%	0
2006	Jozef Ševc	Parliament	89,418	3.88%	0
2009	Jozef Hrdlička	European Parliament	13,643	1.65%	0
2010	Jozef Hrdlička	Parliament	21,104	0.83%	0
2012	Jozef Hrdlička	Parliament	18,583	0.72%	0
2014	Jozef Hrdlička	European Parliament	8,510	1.51%	0
2016	Jozef Hrdlička	Parliament	16,278	0.62%	0
2019 (Note: In a joint list with VZDOR, running as KSS–VZDOR)	Jozef Hrdlička	European Parliament	6,199	0.63%	0
2023	Jozef Hrdlička	Parliament	9,867	0.33%	0

== See also ==
- Communist Party of Slovakia (1939)
- Communist Party of Czechoslovakia
- Communist Party of Bohemia and Moravia
- Politics of Slovakia
- List of political parties in Slovakia
