= Common Choice =

Common Choice Spoločná voľba
- Founded: 1994
- Dissolved: 1997
- Ideology: Big tent Social democracy
- Political position: Centre-left
- Member parties: Party of the Democratic Left; Social Democratic Party of Slovakia; Green Party; Farmers' Movement

Common Choice (Spoločná voľba) was an election union in Slovakia from 1994 to 1997.

Members were the post-communist Party of the Democratic Left (SDL), the Social Democratic Party of Slovakia (SDSS), the minor Farmers' Movement and the Slovak Green Party.

The SDSS did not get into the Slovak parliament in 1992, which was the reason they joined the Common Choice.

Common Choice gained 10.18% (18 seats) in the Slovak parliament. This was beneath all expectations. They were in opposition against Mečiar's third government.

In 1997, the SDĽ pledged to support the government of Vladimír Mečiar while the SDSS focussed themselves on the other opposition parties and later joined the Slovak Democratic Coalition. Because of this rift, the Common Choice failed and split into different factions.
