= 1998 Slovak parliamentary election =

- 25–26 September 1998

All 150 seats in the National Council 76 seats needed for a majority
- Turnout: 84.25% (▲8.60 pp)
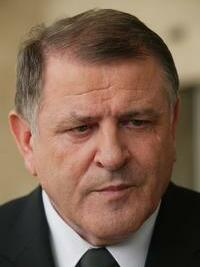

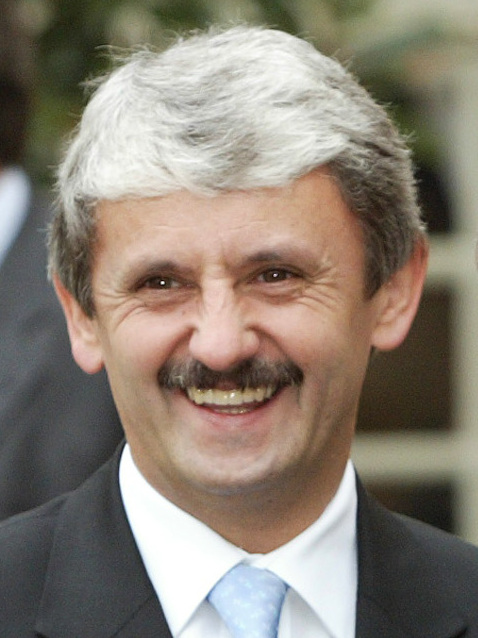

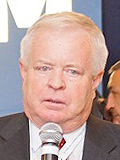

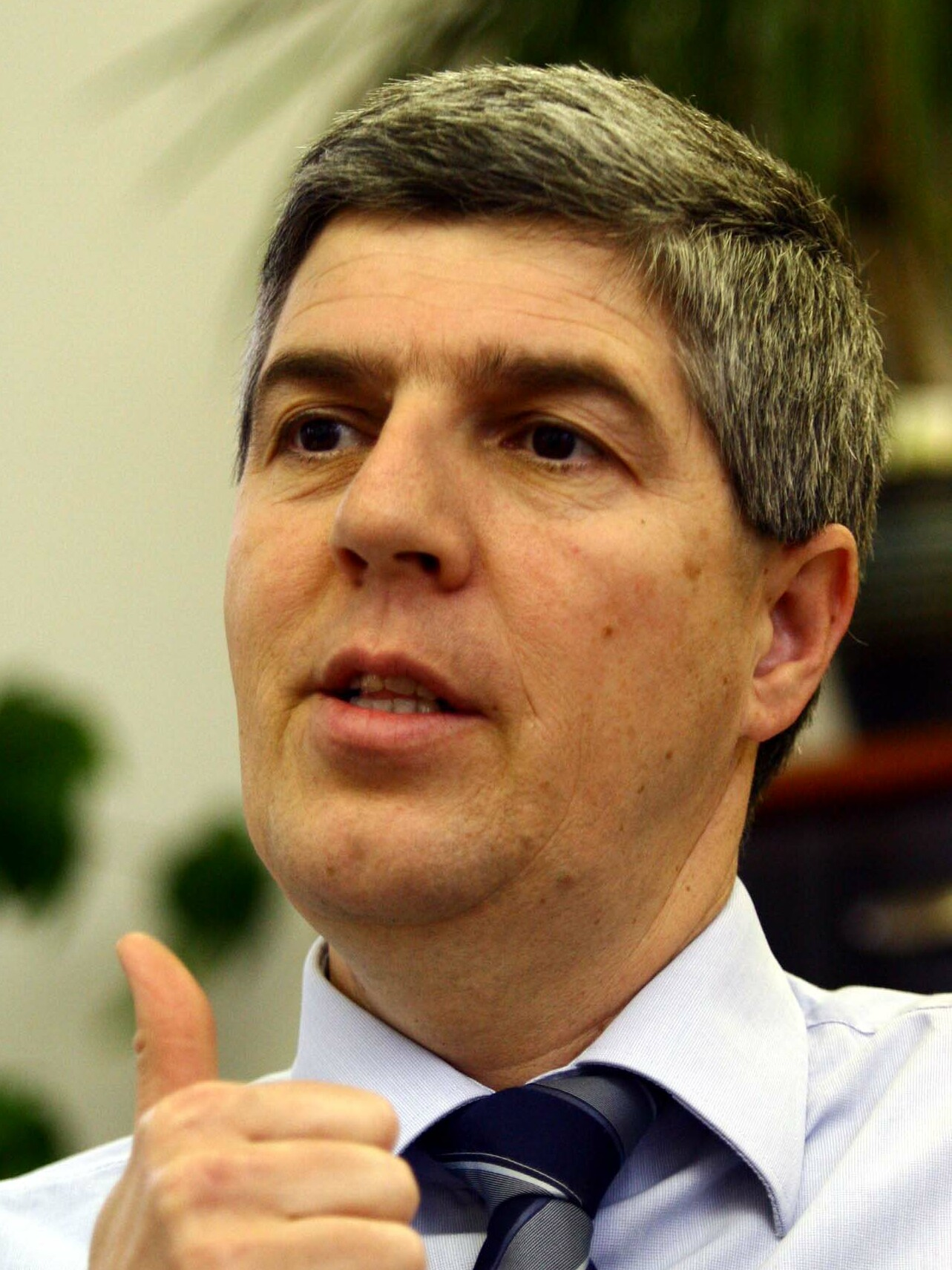

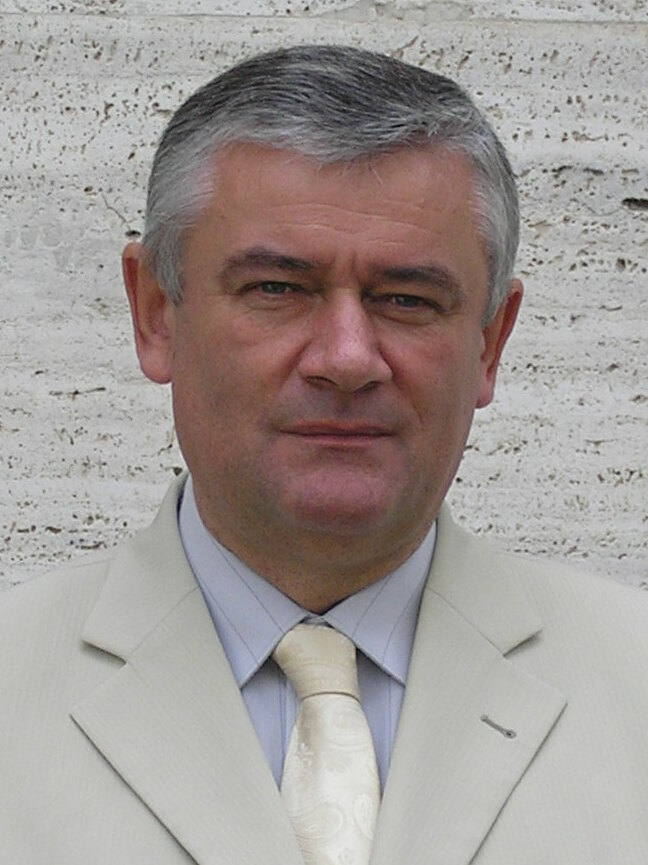

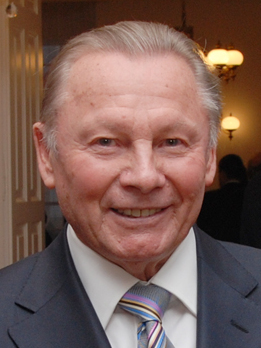
	First party	Second party	Third party
Leader	Vladimír Mečiar	Mikuláš Dzurinda	Jozef Migaš
Party	HZDS	SDK	SDĽ
Last election	61 seats, 35.0%	32 seats, 22.1% (Note: Combined results for KDH, DEÚS, and DS.)	18
Seats won	43	42	23
Seat change	▼18	▲10	▲5
Popular vote	907,103	884,497	492,507
Percentage	27.0%	26.3%	14.7%
Swing	▼8.0 pp	▲4.2 pp	▲4.3 pp
	Fourth party	Fifth party	Sixth party
Leader	Béla Bugár	Ján Slota	Rudolf Schuster
Party	SMK	SNS	SOP
Last election	17 seats, 10.2%	9 seats, 5.4%	Did not exist
Seats won	15	14	13
Seat change	▼2	▲5	New
Popular vote	306,623	304,839	269,343
Percentage	9.1%	9.1%	8.0%
Swing	▼1.1 pp	▲3.7 pp	New
- Vote strength by district
Prime Minister before election
Vladimír Mečiar
HZDS
Elected Prime Minister
Mikuláš Dzurinda
KDH

Parliamentary elections were held in Slovakia on 25 and 26 September 1998. The elections resulted in the defeat of the Vladimír Mečiar government and the election of Mikuláš Dzurinda as Prime Minister. His party, the Slovak Democratic Coalition formed a supermajority coalition government with the Party of the Democratic Left, Party of the Hungarian Coalition, and the Party of Civic Understanding.

== Participating parties ==
Party	Ideology	Political position	Leader
Movement for a Democratic Slovakia (HZDS)	Slovak nationalism Populism	Syncretic	Vladimír Mečiar
Slovak Democratic Coalition (KDH–DÚ–DS–SDSS–SZ)	Christian democracy Economic liberalism	Centre-right	Mikuláš Dzurinda
Party of the Democratic Left (SDĽ)	Social democracy Democratic socialism	Centre-left	Jozef Migaš
Party of the Hungarian Coalition (MKP/SMK)	Hungarian minority interests Christian democracy	Centre-right	Béla Bugár
Slovak National Party (SNS)	Ultranationalism; Right-wing populism	Far-right	Ján Slota
Party of Civic Understanding (SOP)	Social liberalism Populism	Centre-left	Rudolf Schuster

== Results ==
Party	Votes	%	+/–	Seats	+/–
Movement for a Democratic Slovakia	907,103	27.00	–7.97	43	–18
Slovak Democratic Coalition	884,497	26.33	+4.25	42	+10
Party of the Democratic Left	492,507	14.66	–	23	–
Party of the Hungarian Coalition	306,623	9.13	–1.06	15	–2
Slovak National Party	304,839	9.07	+3.67	14	+5
Party of Civic Understanding	269,343	8.02	New	13	New
Communist Party of Slovakia	94,015	2.80	+0.07	0	0
Union of the Workers of Slovakia	43,809	1.30	–6.04	0	–13
Our Slovakia	16,192	0.48	New	0	New
Slovak People's Party	9,227	0.27	New	0	New
Hungarian Popular Movement for Reconciliation and Prosperity	6,587	0.20	New	0	New
Independent Initiative	6,232	0.19	New	0	New
Slovak National Unity	4,688	0.14	New	0	New
B–Revolutionary Workers' Party	4,391	0.13	New	0	New
United Labour Party of Slovakia	3,574	0.11	New	0	New
Slovak National Alternative	3,034	0.09	New	0	New
Third Way Movement	2,515	0.07	New	0	New
Total	3,359,176	100.00	–	150	0
Valid votes	3,359,176	99.11			
Invalid/blank votes	30,170	0.89			
Total votes	3,389,346	100.00			
Registered voters/turnout	4,023,191	84.25			
Source: Nohlen & Stöver
