= Čierna Lehota, Rožňava District =

Village and municipality in Slovakia

Čierna Lehota
- Municipality
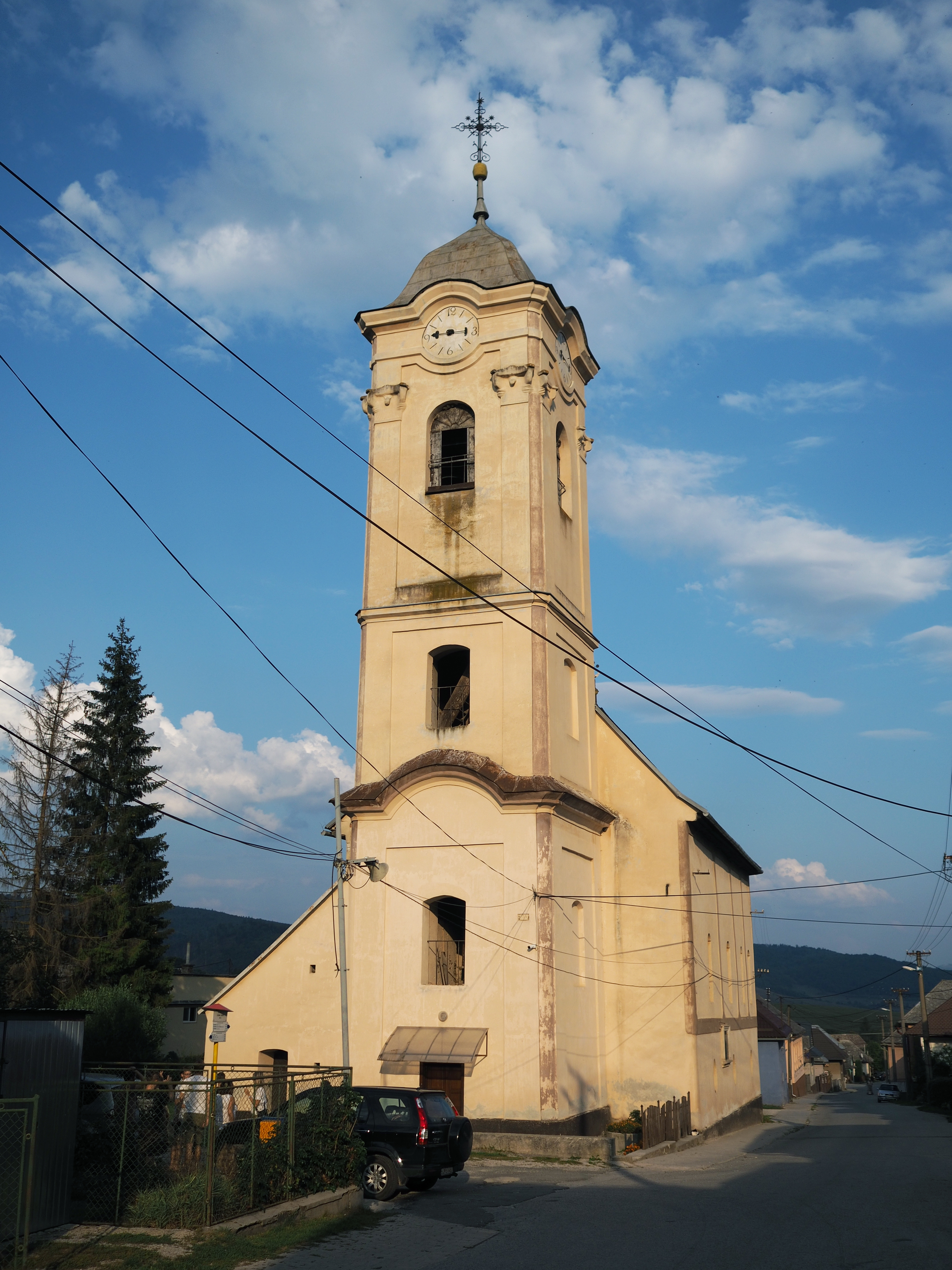

- Flag

- Location of Čierna Lehota in the Košice Region Location of Čierna Lehota in Slovakia
- Coordinates: 48.72°N 20.25°E
- Country: Slovakia
- Region: Košice Region
- District: Rožňava District
- First mentioned: 1389

Area
  - Total: 31.86 km^{2} (12.30 sq mi)
- Elevation: 509 m (1,670 ft)

Population (2025)
  - Total: 573
- Time zone: UTC+1 (CET)
  - Summer (DST): UTC+2 (CEST)
- Postal code: 493 6
- Area code: +421 58
- Vehicle registration plate (until 2022): RV
- Website: www.obecciernalehota.sk

Čierna Lehota (Hungarian: Szabados) is a village and municipality in the Rožňava District in the Košice Region of eastern Slovakia.

== History ==
In historical records the village was first mentioned in 1389. Before the establishment of independent Czechoslovakia in 1918, Čierna Lehota was part of Gömör and Kishont County within the Kingdom of Hungary. From 1939 to 1945, it was part of the Slovak Republic.

== Geography ==
The municipality lies at an altitude of 509 metres (1,670 ft) and covers an area of 31.86 km^{2} (12.30 sq mi) (2025).

== Population ==
Population statistic (10 years)
Year	1995	2005	2015	2025
Count	613	591	671	573
Difference		−3.58%	+13.53%	−14.60%

Population statistic
Year	2024	2025
Count	567	573
Difference		+1.05%

It has a population of 573 people (31 December 2025).

=== Ethnicity ===
Census 2021 (1+ %)
Ethnicity	Number	Fraction
Slovak	591	97.2%
Not found out	16	2.63%
Romani	8	1.31%
Total	608	

In year 2021 was 608 people by ethnicity 591 as Slovak, 16 as Not found out, 8 as Romani, 6 as Italian, 4 as Czech, 3 as Hungarian and 1 as Polish.

Note on population: The difference values of population numbers in the table "Population statistic" and in the sections "Ethnicity" & "Religion" is caused by the use of various statistical methods.

=== Religion ===
Census 2021 (1+ %)
Religion	Number	Fraction
None	372	61.18%
Evangelical Church	176	28.95%
Roman Catholic Church	30	4.93%
Not found out	12	1.97%
Greek Catholic Church	11	1.81%
Total	608	

In year 2021 was 608 people by religion 372 from None, 176 from Evangelical Church, 30 from Roman Catholic Church, 12 from Not found out, 11 from Greek Catholic Church, 3 from United Methodist Church, 2 from Ad hoc movements, 1 from Calvinist Church and 1 from Other and not ascertained christian church.

== Culture ==
The village has a small public library, a football pitch and a food store.

== Genealogical resources ==
The records for genealogical research are available at the state archive "Statny Archiv in Banska Bystrica, Kosice, Slovakia"

- Greek Catholic church records (births/marriages/deaths): 1818-1895 (parish B)
- Lutheran church records (births/marriages/deaths): 1785-1947 (parish A)

== See also ==
- List of municipalities and towns in Slovakia
