= Slovak Democratic Coalition =

Slovak Democratic Coalition Slovenská demokratická koalícia
- Abbreviation: SDK
- Leader: Mikuláš Dzurinda
- Founded: 3 July 1997
- Dissolved: 30 August 2002
- Merger of: Democratic Union; Christian Democratic Movement; Democratic Party; Social Democratic Party of Slovakia; Green Party in Slovakia.
- Succeeded by: Slovak Democratic and Christian Union (de facto)

Website
- sdk.sk (archived)

The Slovak Democratic Coalition (Slovak: Slovenská demokratická koalícia, SDK) was a Slovak de jure political party to serve as a de facto electoral coalition for the 1998 parliamentary election. It was founded in 1997 and dissolved in 2002.

The arrangement was adopted to avoid the 25% electoral threshold that Slovak law imposed on five-party electoral coalitions. Its membership consisted of the 150 candidates nominated for the election by the Democratic Union, the Christian Democratic Movement, the Democratic Party, the Social Democratic Party of Slovakia, and the Green Party in Slovakia.

In the election, SDK won 26.3% of the vote, finishing in second place, and subsequently formed Dzurinda's First Cabinet with the Party of the Democratic Left, the Party of the Hungarian Coalition, and the Party of Civic Understanding as junior coalition partners.

While the original agreement stipulated that the SDK would dissolve following the election and that its members would rejoin their original parties, a faction led by Prime Minister Mikuláš Dzurinda did not return to their former parties. Instead, they founded the Slovak Democratic and Christian Union, which effectively succeeded SDK.
