= Social Democratic Party of Slovakia =

Social Democratic Party of Slovakia Sociálnodemokratická strana Slovenska
- Abbreviation: SDSS
- Founded: 1990
- Dissolved: 2005
- Merged into: Direction–Social Democracy
- Headquarters: Bratislava
- Ideology: Social democracy
- Political position: Centre-left
- National affiliation: Czechoslovak Social Democracy (1990–1992); Common Choice (1994–1997); Slovak Democratic Coalition (1997–2000)
- International affiliation: Socialist International
- Colours: Red

The Social Democratic Party of Slovakia (Slovak: Sociálnodemokratická strana Slovenska, SDSS) was a centre-left political party in Slovakia. Its last chairman, since 1993, was Jaroslav Volf, and its chairman in 1992 was Alexander Dubček.

== Czechoslovakia (until 1992) ==
The party arose after the Velvet Revolution, in January 1990, and declared that it will attempt to continue the work of the "Slovak Social Democratic Party of the Kingdom of Hungary" (1905–1918) and of other social democratic parties forbidden in 1948 by the Communists.

Most of the time it failed to win seats in elections. In 1992 the party gained five seats (6.1% of the votes in Slovakia) in the "House of Nations" (Sněmovna národů) of the federal parliament of Czechoslovakia, which however was only because the party chairman was briefly Alexander Dubček, the ex-Czechoslovak leader, in 1992. Prior to his early death in November 1992, he was one of their MPs in the federal parliament.

== Independent Slovakia (from 1993) ==
From 1994 to 1997, the SDSS was a member of a coalition called "Common Choice" (Spoločná voľba) that gained 10.18% (5 seats) in the Slovak parliament. They did not form a part of the government.

Following the 1998 elections, they joined the ruling Slovak Democratic Coalition until 2002. When Slovakia became a member of the European Union (on 1 May 2004), they were a part of the Party of European Socialists, a European political party, along with the Party of the Democratic Left. The SDSS was also a member of the Socialist International.

In 2003, an agreement was signed with the Direction (Smer) party to work closely together in all spheres. On 1 January 2005 the SDSS finally merged with Direction to form Direction – Social Democracy.
