= Party of the Democratic Left (Slovakia) =

Party of the Democratic Left Strana demokratickej ľavice
- Leader: Peter Weiss (1991–1996); Jozef Migaš (1996–2001); Pavel Koncoš (2001–2002); Ľubomír Petrák (2002–2004)
- Deputy leader: Robert Fico (1998–1999); Branislav Ondruš (2001–2002)
- Founder: Peter Weiss
- Founded: 22 November 1990
- Dissolved: 31 December 2004
- Preceded by: Communist Party of Slovakia
- Merged into: Direction–Social Democracy
- Headquarters: Bratislava
- Ideology: Social democracy Democratic socialism
- Political position: Centre-left
- National affiliation: Communist Party of Czechoslovakia (1990–1991); Common Choice (1994–1997)
- European affiliation: Party of European Socialists
- European Parliament group: Party of European Socialists
- International affiliation: Socialist International
- Colours: Pink

Party flag

The Party of the Democratic Left (Slovak: Strana demokratickej ľavice, SDĽ) was a social-democratic political party in Slovakia from 1990 to 2004. It was founded in 1990 out of the Communist Party of Slovakia.

== History ==
At the party congress on 14 December 1991 in Trenčín, the congress adopted new party constitution and decided to leave federation of Communist Party of Czecho-Slovakia, due to disputes with the Communist Party of Bohemia and Moravia and changing situation in the Czech and Slovak Federative Republic. Congress reconfirmed Peter Weiss as party chairman.

From 1994 to 1997, SDĽ was a member of a coalition called "Common Choice" (Spoločná voľba) that gained 10.18% (18 seats) in the Slovak parliament. They did not form a part of the government. Since the 2002 elections, it has had no seat in the Slovak legislature. It was a member of the Party of European Socialists and the Socialist International.

On 4 December 2004, the party membership voted to merge with Direction – Social Democracy from 1 January 2005. The latter party had broken off from the SDL five years earlier.

== Election results ==
=== National Council ===
Year	Leader	Vote	Vote %	Place	Seats	Government
1992	Peter Weiss	453,203	14.7	2nd	29 / 150	Opposition
1994	Peter Weiss	299,469▼	10.4 ▼	2nd	18 / 150	Opposition
1998	Jozef Migaš	492,507 ▲	14.7 ▲	3rd ▼	23 / 150	SDK–SDĽ–SMK–SOP
2002	Pavel Koncoš	39,163 ▼	1.4 ▼	12th ▼	0 / 150	No seats

== Name changes ==
- Communist Party of Slovakia (succeeding Communist Party of Slovakia) (22. 11. 1990)
- Communist Party of Slovakia – Party of the Democratic Left (12. 2. 1991)
- Party of the Democratic Left (1. 2. 1992)

== See also ==
- Politics of Slovakia
- List of political parties in Slovakia
- Party of the Democratic Left (Czech Republic)
